= List of Honda motorcycles =

The Honda 'Wingmark' logo used on the company's motorcycles and ATVs.

The following is a list of motorcycles, scooters, and mopeds produced by the Japanese company Honda.

Honda have produced and sold motorcycles since 1955.

== List by production series ==
- CB series
- CBF series
- CBR series
- CBX series
- CJ series
- CL series
- CLR series
- CM/CMX series
- CR series
- CRF series
- CT series
- CX series
- FT series
- GL series
- MB/T/X series
- NC series
- NT series
- NX Series
- RC Series (HRC)
- RS Series
- ST series
- VF/VFR series
- WN series
- VT series
- VTX series
- XR/XL series
- Z series

== List by engine size ==
Name	Engine size (cc)	Image
Beat (FC50)	48	
Super Cub C100, CA100, C102, C50	49	
Sports Cub C110, C111, C110D, C114, CA110	49	
CB50	49	
Dio	49/110	
Elite E (SB50)	49	
Elsinore (MR50)	49	
Express (NC50)	49	
Hunter Cub (CT50)	49	
Joker	49	
Julio	49	
MB5, MB50	49	
Melody NB50, ND50, NP50, NS50	49	
Metropolitan Jazz (CHF 50)	49	
Metropolitan II (CHF50P)	49	
Motra (CT50)	49	
MT5, MT50	49	
MTX50, MTX50R	49	
NCZ50 also known as Motocompo	49	
Spree (NQ50)	49	
Mini Trail (Z50A)	49	
Mini Trail (Z50M)	49	
Mini Trail (Z50R)	49	
Mini Trail (Z50J)	49	
Moped (P50, P25)	49	
Moped (PA50/Hobbit/Camino)	49	
Moped (PF50/Amigo)	49	
Moped (PC50, PS50)	49	
Moped (SFX50)	49	
Moped (SH50)	49	
Moped (X8RS)	49	
SGX50 (Sky)	49	
SS50	49	
Trail 50 (C100H, C100T, CA100T)	49	
XR50R	49	
ZB50	49	
Zoomer/Ruckus (NPS50)	49	
AC15	50	
Super Cub C105, CD105	54	
Sports Cub C115(Canada Only)	54	
Trail 55 (C105H, C105T, CA105T)	54	
Super Cub C65, S65	63	
C70 Passport, CD70	72	
Motosport (SL70)	72	
Motosport (XL70)	72	
ST70, CT70 Trail 70	72	
Scrambler (CL70)	72	
XL80	79	
Aero 80 (NH80)	80	
XR80	80	
CR85R Expert	85	
Super Cub C90 (12 volt)	86	
Super Cub CM90, Honda Trail 90 C200	87	
Trail 90 (CT200)	87	
Super Cub CM91, C90 (6 volt), CD90	89	
Trail 90 (CT90)	89	
S90 CS90, Sport 90, Super 90	90	
Super Cub C100EX	97	
Astrea Prima (C100EX)	97	
Astrea Grand, Astrea Impressa, Dream 100, Astrea Legenda (C100EX)	97	
Astrea Supra 100 (C100EX)	97	
SupraFit, FitX, Wave 100, Bravo (NF100)	97	
Revo 100 (NF100)	97	
D-Type/Dream	98	
Shine 100	98.98	
CB100 (K0, K1, K2, K3, K4, K5, CB100N)	99	
Scrambler (CL100)	100	
H100S Super	100	
Bali also known as SJ 100	100	
Dio/Lead	102	
Trail 110 (CT110)	105	
GL-100 ASIA	105	
Tena	105	
Activa	109.51/125	
Blade 110R, WaveDash 110R, CZ-i (NF11A)	109	
Aviator	109	
Revo 110 series, Wave 110 Series (NF110)	109	
CB Twister, CB110	109	
Dream Yuga/Dream Neo	109	
iCON / BeAT 110 AT Series	109	
CD 110 Dream DX	109.51	
Livo	109.51	
Dio	109.51	
Navi	109	
S110 Benly	109	
Scoopy AT	109	
Spacy AT	109	
Super Cub 110	109	
Astrea Grand 110i	109	
Honda Vario AT / CLICK AT	109	
Honda Vario TECHNO AT	109	
XRM	110	
CB125	122/124	
XL125	122/124	
MT125R	123	
Shine 125	123.94	
SP 125	123.94	
Benly (C92/CA92, CB92)	124	
CB125E	124	
CD125TC Benly	124	
CB125TD Super dream	124	
Giorno+	124	
GL-125	124	
GL-Max 125 (CB125JX)	124	
GL-Max NeoTech 1250 (GL-125)	124	
Super Sport (CG125)	124	
CLR125 "CityFly"	124	
CM125	124	
Nova Dash RS	124	
Kirana (NF125 KPH)	124	
Karisma (NF125 KPH)	124	
Supra X 125 (NF125 KPH)	124	
New Supra X 125 Fi (NF125 KYZ)	124	
Blade 125 Fi (NF125 KYZ)	124	
Nova Sonic RS125	124	
Elsinore (CR125M)	124	
Juno M80	124	
Honda LS125R	124	
Activa 125	124	
Honda NS125	125	
NSR125 (JC20, JC21)	124	
Scrambler (CL125)	124	
Super Cub (C125)	124	
Varadero (XL125V)	124	
Aero & Lead (NH125)	125	
CBR125	125	
CR93	125	
Atlas Honda CG125	125	
Dylan 125	125	
Innova (ANF125)	125	
Pantheon FES125	125	
PCX125	125	
RC143	125	
Shadow	125	
Vario 125 / Click 125 / AirBlade 125	124	
Grom	125	
Monkey	125	
Trail 125 ABS	125	
Super Sport (CB125)	125	
Super Sport (SS125)	125	
GL-PRO (GL-145)	144	
GL-PRO Black Engine (GL-145 Black)	144	
Honda Dream E-Type	145	
Honda Dream 3E	145	
CRF150L	149	
CRF150R	149	
CRF150R Expert	149	
CRF150F	149	
Unicorn Dazzler	149	
Trigger/CB150	149	
CB150R (K15)	149	
Verza/CB150 Verza (GL150)	149	
New Mega Pro (GL150)	149	
CBR150R	149	
CBR150R K45	149	
Winner 150 / Supra 150 GTR / RS150R	149	
Winner X / RS-X	149	
Pantheon (FES150)	149	
NSR150RR/SP (NS150)	149	
FSX150	149	
SH150, SH150i	153	
Benly (C95/CA95)	154	
TMX155	155	
GL PRO NeoTech 1600 (GL-160)	156.7	
Mega Pro 1600 (GL-160)	156.7	
Honda Dream 2E	160	
Hornet CBR	162	
Unicorn	162.7	
SP 160	162.71	
Juno M85	169	
CD175	174	
Super Sport (CB175)	174	
XL175	175	
Hornet 2.0	184.40	
CB 200X	184.4	
Honda Dream 6E	189	
Juno K	189	
RoadMaster/Twinstar (CD200)	194	
Reflex (TLR200)	194	
Tiger 2000 (GL-200)	196	
Phantom (TA200)	197	
CB200	198	
CL200	198	
Fatcat (TR200)	199	
Honda Dream 4E	219	
Juno KA/KB	220	
CD250U	233	
CM250C, CM250T	234	
Nighthawk (CB250)	234	
CMX250C, CMX250CD	234	
CR250R	248	
Elsinore (CR250M)	248	
Integra (VT250F)	248	
Big Ruckus (PS250)	249	
Dream (CB250)	249	
Jade (CB250F)	249	
Hornet (CB250F)	249	
CB250 G5	249	
Super Dream (CB250N)	249	
CBR250	249	
CBX250RS	249	
CRF250L	249	
MVX250F (MC09)	249	
NSR250R (MC16, MC18, MC21, MC28)	249	
Reflex (NSS250)	249	
NX250/AX-1	249	
Spada (VT250L, MC20)	249	
XR250R	249	
CBF250	250	
CBR250R (MC41)	250	CBR250R (MC41)
Dream (C70)	250	
Dream (C71, C72)	250	
Hawk (CB72)	250	
CJ250T	250	
Helix (CN250)	250	
Sport (CB250)	250	
CB250RS	250	
CRF250L	250	
VTR250 (Interceptor and MC33)	250	
XL250	250	
CB300R	286	
CRF300	286	
XRE300	291	
Dream (C76, C77)	305	1963 Honda CA77 305 Dream "early" version.
Scrambler (CL77)	305	
Super Hawk (CB77)	305	
CB350 Super Sport	325	
Four (CB350F)	350	
Sport (CB350)	350	
CB350 RS	350	
CB350 H'ness	350	
Sport (CL350)	350	
Sport (SL350)	350	
XL350R	350	
Scrambler (CL360)	356	
Sport (CB360, CB360T)	356	
CL400	387	
NS400R	387	
CB400A Hawk Hondamatic	395	
CB400N	395	
Hawk (CB400T, CB400T II)	395	
CM400	395	
VRX400 Roadster	398	
CB-1 (CB400F, NC27)	399	
RVF400R (NC35)	399	
VF400F (NC13)	399	
VFR400 (NC30)	399	
CBR400RR (NC23, NC29)	400	
CBX400	400	
NT400 (BROS)	400	
Four (CB400F)	408	
Scrambler (CL450)	444	
Sport/Hellcat (CB450)	444	
Nighthawk (CB450SC)	445	
CB450DX (CB450N/PC14)	447	
Hondamatic (CM450A)	447	
CMX450	447	
CB450S PC17	447	
CRF450R	449	
CB500F	471	
CBR500R	471	
CB500X	471	
CMX500	471	
CL500/SCL500	471	
NX500	471	
CB500 Hornet	471	
CR480	472	
Ascot (VT500, VT500FT)	491	
Shadow VT500	491	
(VT500E)	491	
CX500	497	
Four (CB500)	498	
Ascot (FT500)	498	
Tourist Trophy (GB500)	498	
XBR500	498	
Sport (CB500 twin)	499	
CBF500	499	
NSR500	499	
Interceptor (VF500F)	500	
Magna V30 (VF500C)	500	
Silver Wing (GL500)	500	
Turbo (CX500)	500	
XBR500	500	
Four (CB550F)	550	
Nighthawk (CB550SC)	550	
Four (CBX550F/FII)	573	
599	600	
CB600F also known as Hornet, and 599	600	
CBF600N	600	
CBF600S	600	
Hurricane (CBR600F)	600	
Honda CBR600F2	600	
Honda CBR600F3	600	
CBR600F4i	600	
CBR600RR	600	
Shadow (VT600C VLX)	600	
Transalp (XL600V)	600	
XR600R (offroad)	600	
Four (CB650)	626	
Bros/HawkGT (RC31)	647	
NTV/Revere (NTV650)	647	
Deauville (NT650V)	647	
CBX650	650	
Nighthawk (CB650SC)	650	
Silver Wing (GL650)	650	
Transalp (XL650V)	650	
Turbo (CX650T)	650	
Africa Twin (RD03)	650	
XR650L	650	
Dominator (NX650)	650	
Honda CTX700N	670	
Honda DN-01	680	
Nighthawk (CB700SC)	700	
Deauville (NT700V)	700	
Transalp (XL700V)	700	
Integra (RC62)	700	
Four (CB750)	736	
Hondamatic (CB750A)	736	
NC750X	745	
RS750R	748	
VFR750R (RC30)	748	
Africa Twin (RD07)	750	
CBX750	750	
Interceptor (VF750F, VFR750)	750	
Magna (VF750C V45)	750	
Magna Deluxe (VF750CD)	750	
Sabre (VF750S)	750	
Nighthawk (CB750, CB750SC)	750	
RVF750 (RC45)	750	
NR	750	
XLV750R	750	
CB750 Hornet	755	
XL750 Transalp	755	
Crossrunner (VFR800X)	782	
Interceptor (VFR800FI)	782	
RC212V	800	
Pacific Coast (PC800)	800	
RS850R	858	
CBR900RR including CBR954RR	900	
Custom (CB900C)	900	
Super Sport (CB900F) a.k.a. 919	900	
RS930	928	
RC211V	990	
Honda VF 1000 F (SC 15)	998	
Honda VF 1000 R (SC 16)	998	
Gold Wing (GL1000)	999	
CB1000	1000	
CB1000R	1000	
CBF1000	1000	
CBR1000RR	1000	
Custom (CB1000C)	1000	
CBX1000	1000	
Hurricane (CBR1000F)	1000	
RC51 (RVT1000R)	1000	
Honda VTR1000f (a.k.a. Super Hawk a.k.a. Firestorm)	1000	
Super Sport (CBX)	1000	
VTR1000R (RVT1000) SP1 & SP2 RC51	1000	
XL1000V Varadero	1000	
FWS1000 (RS1000RW)	1028	
HAWK11	1084	
NT1100	1084	
Gold Wing (GL1100)	1085	
CBR1100XX	1100	
Magna (VF1100C V65)	1100	
Sabre (VF1100S V65)	1100	
Pan-European (ST1100)	1100	
Super Sport (CB1100F)	1100	
Racing Modified CB1100F (CB1100R)	1100	
X11 (CB1100SF)	1137	
CB1100 (CB1100A)	1140	
Gold Wing (GL1200)	1182	
VFR1200F	1200	VFR1200F (2011-2015)
Crosstourer (VFR1200X)	1237	
CB1300	1300	
VTX1300	1300	
Pan-European (ST1300)	1300	
Fury	1312	
Gold Wing (GL1500)	1520	
Valkyrie (GL1500C/F6C)	1520	
VTX1800	1800	
Gold Wing (GL1800)	1832	

== List by vehicle type ==
=== Mopeds and light motorcycles ===
- Honda A-Type
- AirBlade
- Ape series
- Chaly
- Cub series
- Cub F
- CT50 Motra
- CY50
- Express
- Grom
- MB/T/X series two-stroke models
- MB50/MB5
- MR50
- MT50/MT5
- P50/P25
- PA50 (Hobbit/Camino)
- PC50/PS50
- SFX50
- SH50
- SL70
- ST series (Dax)
- Wave series
- Z series Monkey models
- ZB50

=== Off-road models ===
- CRF150F
- CRF250X
- CRF450X
- CRF450RX
- CRF230F
- MR250
- TR200
- XR80
- XR100
- XR250R
- XR350R
- XR600R
- XR650R

=== Electric motorcycles ===
- WN7

=== Dual-purpose models ===
- CRF150L
- CRF230L
- CRF250L/CRF300L
- CRF1000L Africa Twin
- CRF1100L Africa Twin
- MT125
- MT250
- NX250
- NX650 Dominator
- SL90
- TLR200
- Transalp
- XL70
- XL75
- XL80
- XL100
- XL125
- XL125V Varadero
- XL175
- XL250
- XL350
- XL500
- XL600LM/RMG
- XR650L
- XRE300
- NX4 Falcon
- XRV650 Africa Twin
- XRV750T Africa Twin

=== Motocross models ===
- CR80R
- CR85R Expert
- CR125R
- CR250R
- CR500R
- CRF110R
- CRF150R
- CRF250R
- CRF450R

=== Scooters ===
- Activa
- Aviator
- Beat (FC50)
- Big Ruckus
- Biz
- CN250 (Helix/Fusion/Spazio)
- Honda Dio
- Elite
- Express, Express SR
- Grazia
- Joker
- Julio
- Juno
- Metropolitan/Jazz/Scoopy/Crea Scoopy
- Metropolitan II
- Motocompo
- NH series
- Eve/Spree/Nifty 50 (NQ50)
- Reflex, Reflex ABS (NSS300 Forza in Europe and Canada)
- PCX 125 and 150
- Pop 100 and 110i
- Silver Wing, Silver Wing ABS
- SFX50
- SH150i
- Vario/Click/AirBlade
- Vision/Spacy
- Zoomer/Ruckus
- Honda Cliq
- Honda Genio
- Honda Navi
- Honda Scoopy
- Honda Stylo

=== Racing (HRC) models ===
- CR93
- MT125R
- NR500
- NSR500
- NSR500V
- RC211V
- RC212V
- RC213V
- RCV1000R
- RS125R
- RS250R

=== All-terrain vehicles ===
- 1987 Honda ATC50 (prototype)
- 1973–1974, 1978–1985 Honda ATC70; first mini ATV
- 1970–1978 Honda ATC90 (was US90 from 1970 to 1973)
- 1979–1985 Honda ATC110
- 1984–1987 Honda ATC125M
- Honda ATC125R (prototype)
- 1980 Honda ATC185
- 1981–1983 Honda ATC185S
- 1981–1987 Honda ATC200 series
  - 1981–1983 Honda ATC200
  - 1983–1984 Honda ATC200E Big Red
  - 1984 Honda ATC200ES Big Red
  - 1984–1985 Honda ATC200M
  - 1984–1986 Honda ATC200S
  - 1983–1987 Honda ATC200X
- 1985 Honda ATC200R (prototype)
- 1985–1987 Honda ATC250ES
- 1981–1986 Honda ATC250R; first high-performance ATV
- 1985–1987 Honda ATC250SX
- Honda ATC300R (prototype)
- Honda ATC350R (prototype)
- 1985–1986 Honda ATC350X
- 1987 Honda ATC500R (prototype)
- 1977–1988 Honda Odyssey 250 and 350
- 1989–1990 Honda Pilot 400
- 1990 Honda Duet (prototype)
- 1986–1987 Honda Fourtrax 70
- 1993–present Honda TRX90X
- 1985–1988 Honda Fourtrax 125
- 1984 Honda Fourtrax 200 (Honda's first four-wheel ATV)
- 1990–1991 Honda Fourtrax 200 "Trunkmobile"
- 1991–1997 Honda Fourtrax 200 Type II
- 1986–1988 Honda Fourtrax 200SX
- 1997–present Honda Recon 250
- 1985–1987 Honda Fourtrax 250
- 1986–1989 Honda Fourtrax 250R
- 1987–1988, 1991–1992 Honda Fourtrax 250X
- 2006–present Honda Sportrax 250EX/250X
- 1988–2000 Honda Fourtrax 300
- 1993–1999 Honda Fourtrax 300EX
- 1986–1989 Honda Fourtrax 350/Foreman 350 (Honda's first four-wheel-drive ATV)
- 2000–2006 Honda Rancher TRX350TM/TE/FM/FE
- 2004–2007 Honda Rancher TRX400FA/FGA Automatic
- 1999–2016 Honda Fourtrax 400EX/400X
- 1995–2004 Honda Foreman 400
- 2016–present Honda Rancher 420
- 1998–2004 Honda Foreman 450S/450ES
- 2004–2014 Honda TRX450R
- 2001–2019 Honda Foreman 500/Foreman Rubicon 500
- 2020–present Honda Foreman 520/Foreman Rubicon 520
- 2003–2005 Honda Rincon 650
- 2006–present Honda Rincon 680
- 2008-2009 Honda TRX 700XX

=== Side-by-Sides (SXS) ===
- 2008-2013 Honda Big Red 700, Honda's first Side-by-Side
- 2015–present Honda Pioneer 500
- 2021–present Honda Pioneer 520
- 2013–present Honda Pioneer 700
- 2016–present Honda Pioneer 1000
- 2019–present Honda Talon 1000R
- 2019–present Honda Talon 1000X

=== Prototypes ===
- 19
- 8 B-Type
- 1995 EXP-2
- 2007 EVO6

== See also ==
- Honda racing motorcycles
- List of Honda three-wheeled all-terrain vehicles
- List of Honda engines
