= Honda XL175 =

1970s motorcycle produced by Honda

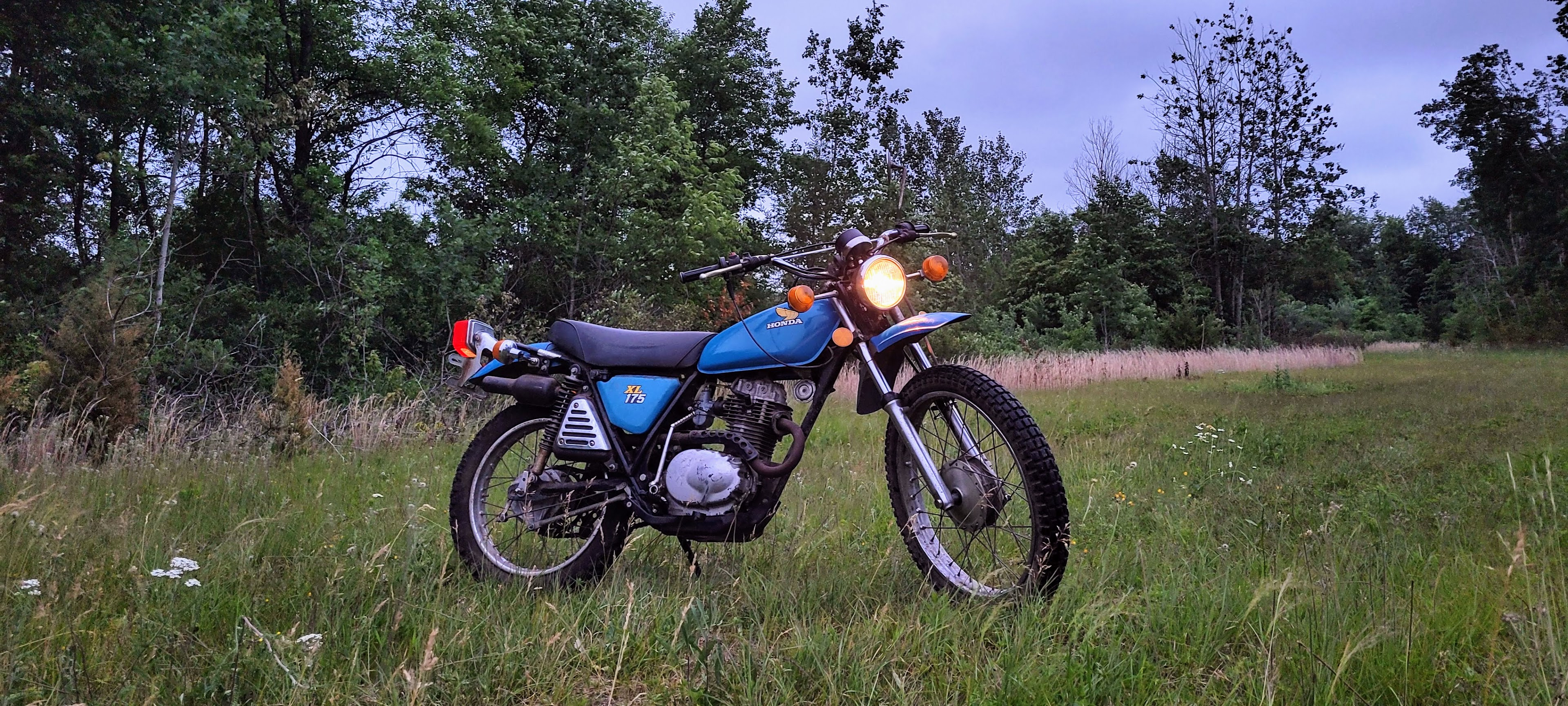
1976 Honda XL175

The Honda XL175 was a motorcycle produced by Honda. The XL175 first entered the market in 1973 as a lightweight dual-sport motorcycle, and the model continued in production through 1978. The XL175 had a 173cc single cylinder OHC four-stroke engine mated to a 5-speed transmission and was started via a kickstarter only (no electric starter). The gauges included a speedometer and a tachometer up until 1976, when the tachometer was deleted for that and subsequent years. Braking was via front and rear cable operated drum brakes. The dimensions of the bike were 2,075x840x1,095mm (82x33x43in).

== History ==
=== 1973 ===
The 1973 XL175 was available in one color, Mars Orange with Silver. The fuel tank and the side covers were orange and the stripes were black. The side cover had a white XL175 decal on it. The front and rear mudguards were silver-painted plastic. The exhaust system was downswept on the K0, K1, and K2 models.

=== 1974 ===
The 1974 XL175 was also only available with one color, Mars Orange with Silver as on the previous model. The fuel tank and sidecovers were orange and the stripes were black. The black stripes were extended to the bottom of the tank. The side cover decal was white and yellow. The mudguards were silver colored plastic.

=== 1975 ===
The 1975 XL175 was available in only one color, Tahitian Red with Silver. The fuel tank and side covers were red and the stripes were black. Both mudguards were plastic and were painted silver.

=== 1976 ===
The 1976 XL175 was available in Aquarius Blue only. The fuel tank, side covers and mudguards were blue. Wheel hubs were polished aluminium. This and subsequent XL175 models featured an upswept exhaust system, an AC ignition, and a revised fifth gear ratio. (Earlier models had a ratio of 0.960; the 1976, '77, and '78 models had 0.885. This change coincided with a rear sprocket of 42 teeth. Earlier models had 38 teeth.) This was the first year that the previous "K" model designator was dropped.

=== 1977 ===
The 1977 XL175 was available in Black and Tahitian Red. The fuel tank and sidecovers were black with a red and white stripe. The side cover decal was red and was outlined with white. Both mudguards were red-painted plastic.

=== 1978 ===
The 1978 XL175 was the last model produced. The colors it came in were Excel Black with Tahitian Red. The side cover decal was red and white like the 1977 model. Both mudguards were plastic painted in red. The stripes were red. The wheel hubs were now black.

== Components ==
=== Electrical System ===
The electrical system in all six years of the XL175 was a six volt system and included a battery, headlight with high/low beam, turn signals, brake/taillight, instrumentation lights, and a horn. A warning light panel was also included on models 1976 through 1978 which displayed lights for 'High Beam' (blue light), 'Turn Signal' (orange light) and 'Neutral' (green light). Models from 1973 through 1975 incorporated warning lights for neutral and turn signals into the tachometer face, and a high beam indicator light on the top of the headlight housing.

In the K0, K1, and K2 models the entire lighting system and the ignition system were DC-powered. These models require a charged battery to start and run. The engine's alternator supplies rectified current to charge the battery. All of the electrical components run from the battery.

Beginning with the 1976 models, and continuing for the 1977 and 1978 models, significant changes were made to the electrical system. The ignition was now AC, which meant the bike would start with a dead battery, as the ignition system drew its power directly from the alternator. Likewise, the headlight also was AC-powered, as it too drew its power directly from the alternator.

However, all other electrical components - lighting and horn - were still DC-powered. In all models, a rectifier converts the alternator's AC to DC in order to charge the battery.

The change in 1976 to AC ignition and an AC headlight caused changes to the wiring harness, the ignition switch, the coil, the alternator, the rotor, and the ignition advance mechanism.

== See also ==
- List of Honda Motorcycles (XL Series)
