= Honda CLR =

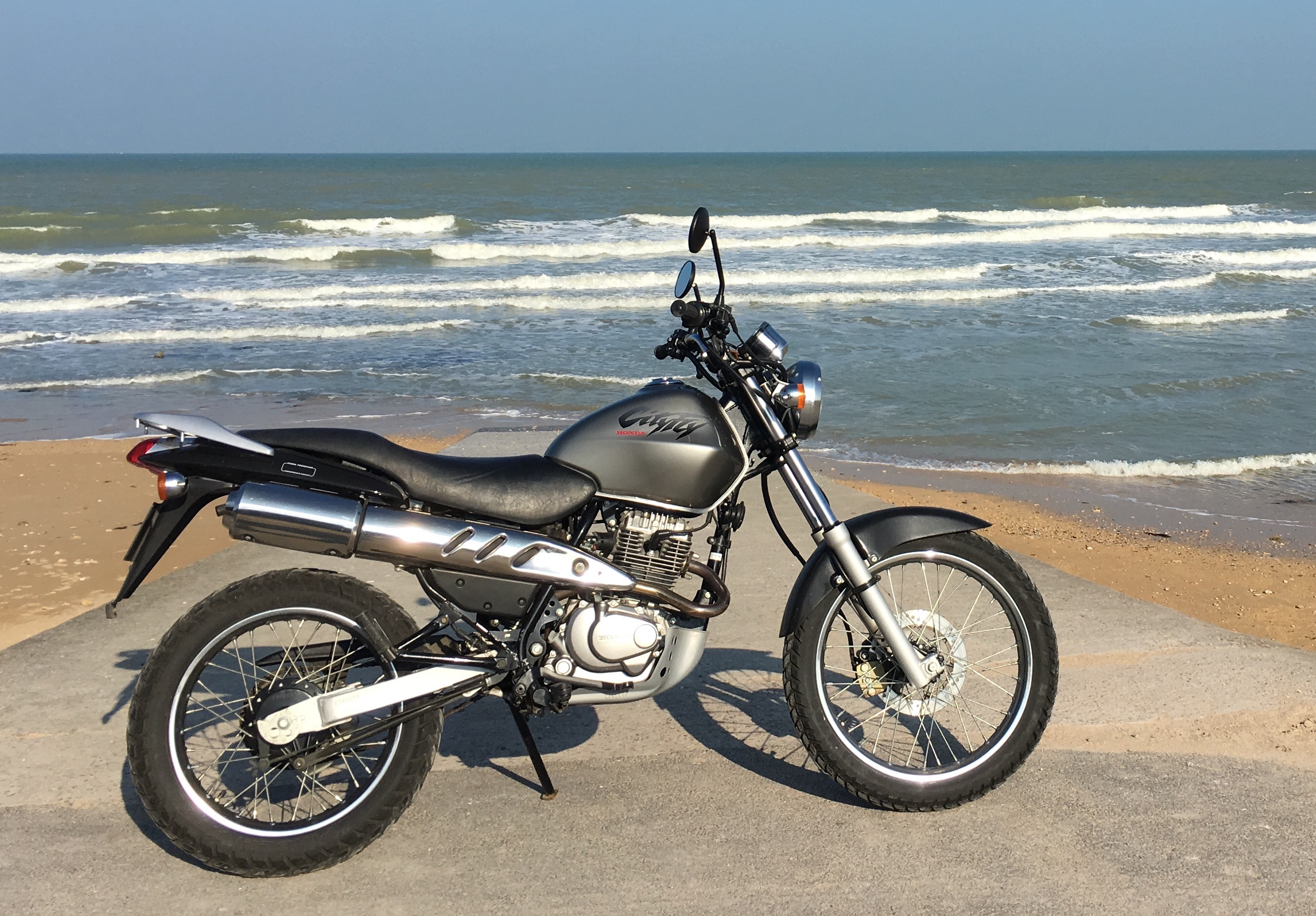
- Honda CLR "CityFly"
- Manufacturer: Honda Motor Company
- Production: 1998–2003
- Class: Dual-sport
- Engine: 124 cc (7.6 cu in), four-stroke, air-cooled, single
- Bore / stroke: 56.5 mm × 49.5 mm (2.22 in × 1.95 in)
- Compression ratio: 9.2:1
- Transmission: 5-speed, manual, chain final drive
- Frame type: Diamond
- Suspension: Front: telescopic Rear: swingarm
- Brakes: Front: disc Rear: drum
- Tyres: Front: 90/90-19 52P; Rear: 110/90-17 60P
- Wheelbase: 1,380 mm (54 in)
- Dimensions: L: 2,070 mm (81 in); W: 780 mm (31 in); H: 1,135 mm (44.7 in)
- Seat height: 815 mm (32.1 in)
- Weight: 118 kg (260 lb) (dry)

The Honda CLR CityFly was introduced in 1998 as a dual purpose motorcycle and is powered by a 124 cc (7.6 cu in) SOHC single-cylinder engine. The machine does not have the same engine as the Honda CG but the engine from the Honda XLR offroad motorcycle. The CLR "CityFly" was discontinued in 2003. Although the motorcycle was launched as a dual purpose machine, it was better known for city use and town use; this was mainly due to the lack of power of the engine.

The Honda CLR received mostly favorable reviews upon release.
