= Honda Dylan 125 =

Honda Dylan
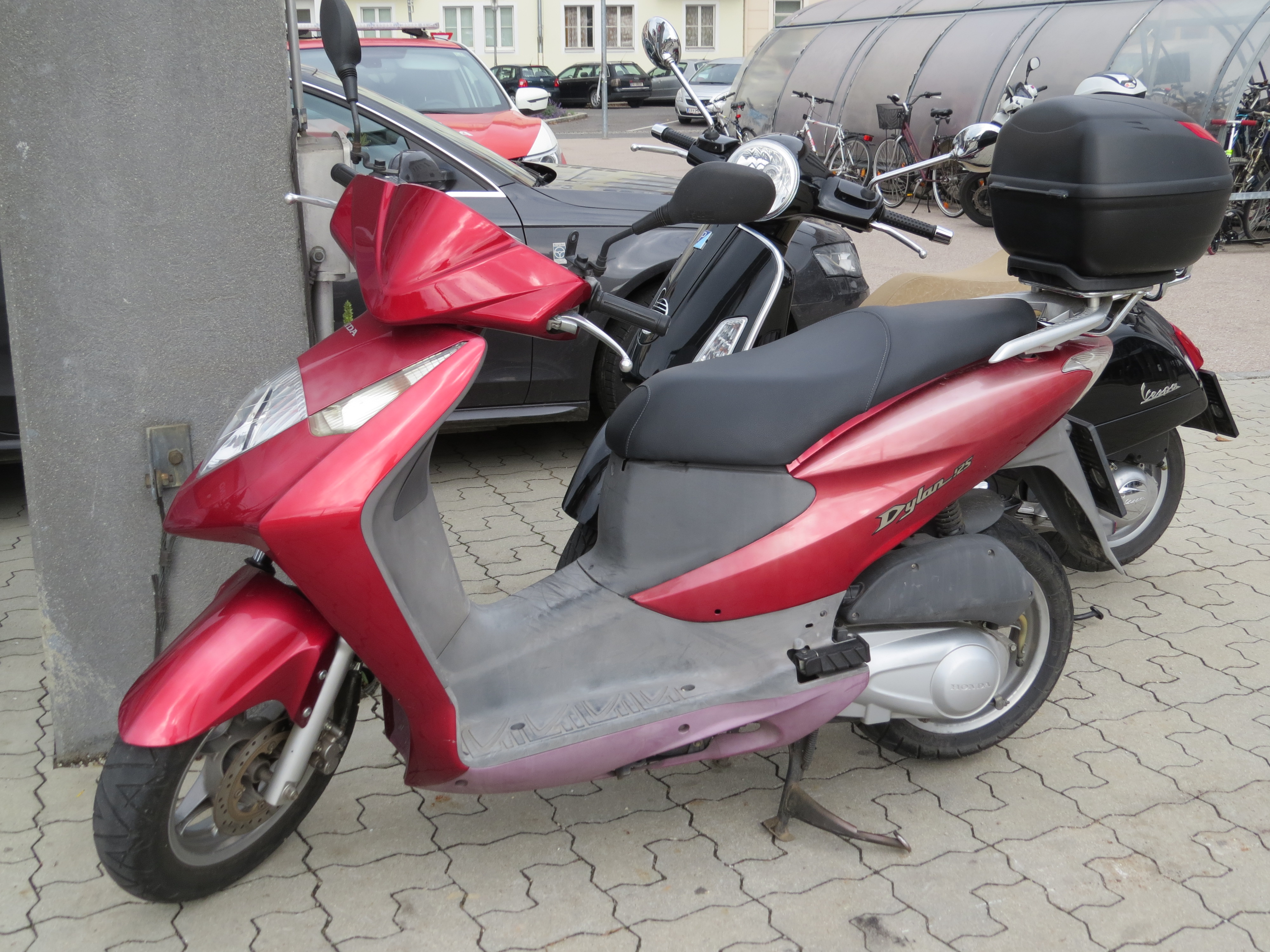
- Manufacturer: Honda
- Also called: Honda SES 125; Honda SES 150
- Production: 2002-2006
- Assembly: Atessa, Italy
- Successor: Honda PS
- Ignition type: Electric start
- Transmission: Honda V-Matic belt-converter automatic
- Suspension: Front: telescopic Rear: swingarm
- Brakes: Front: disc Rear: drum
- Tires: Front: 110/90-13; Rear: 130/70-13
- Wheelbase: 1,330 mm (52 in)
- Dimensions: L: 1,940 mm (76 in); W: 700 mm (28 in); H: 1,170 mm (46 in)
- Seat height: 795 mm (31.3 in)
- Related: Honda @

The Honda Dylan is a motor scooter manufactured by Honda from 2002 to 2006.

== Specification ==
Presented at the Bologna Motor Show in December 2001, the Dylan goes into production at the Honda Italia plant in Atessa the following January; is positioned within the manufacturer's range of scooters between the Honda @ and the SH. In 2006 it was replaced by the Honda PS.

The Dylan uses the same chassis of the European Honda @ and was available with two single-cylinder four-stroke engines, one of 125 and the other of 150 cm^{3}. Engine power was transferred to the rear wheel through a centrifugal clutch equipped with a continuously variable V-belt drive. In addition, the scooter was equipped with a mixed disc-drum braking system, equipped with the CBS (Combined Brake System).
