= Honda XL80S =

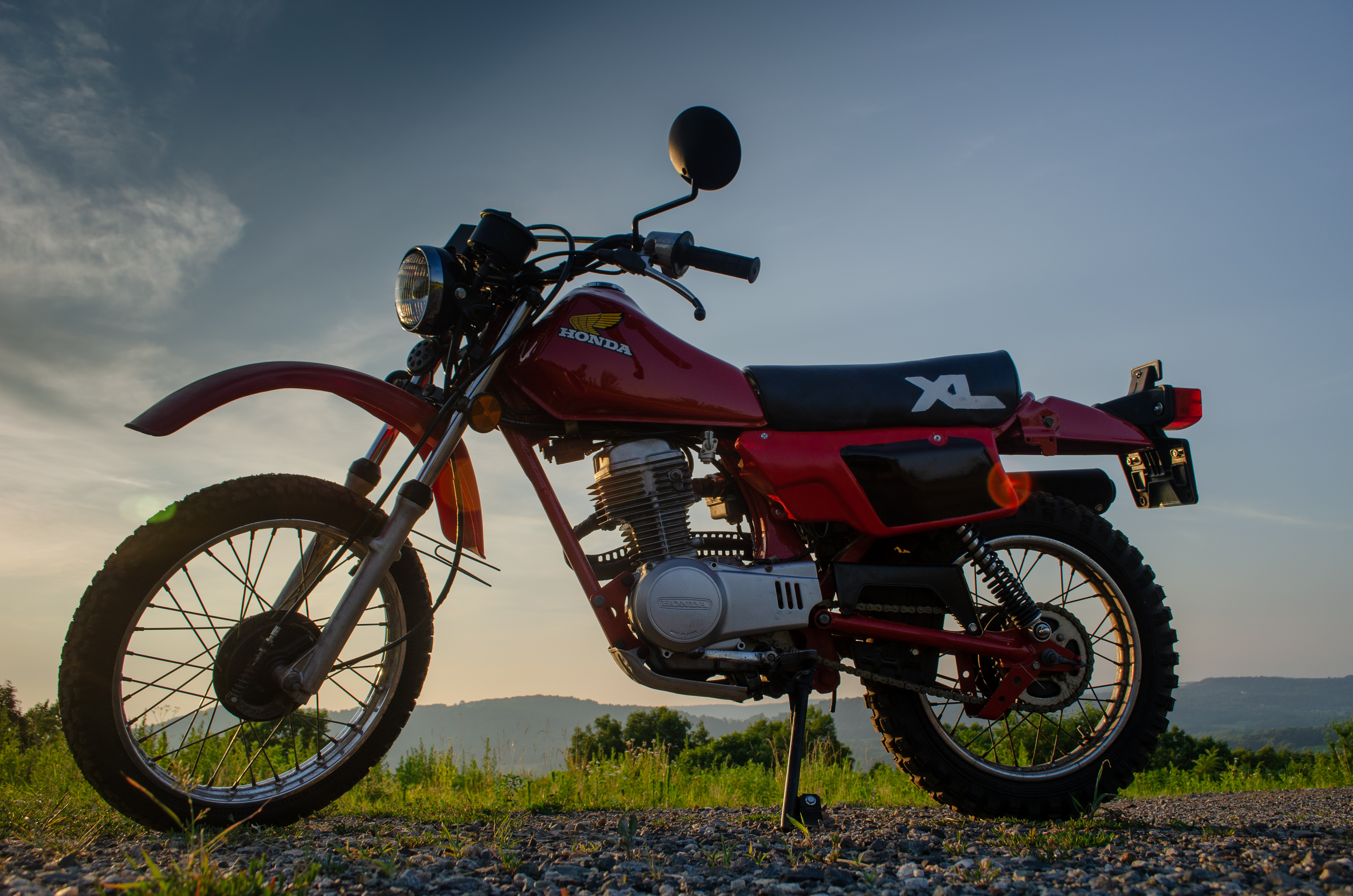
- A 1984 Honda XL80S
- Manufacturer: Honda
- Production: 1980–1985
- Successor: XR Series
- Class: Dual-sport
- Engine: 80 cc (4.9 cu in) OHC four-stroke single-cylinder
- Bore / stroke: 47.5 mm × 45 mm (1.87 in × 1.77 in)
- Compression ratio: 9.4:1
- Power: 4.7 kW (6.3 hp) at 8,000 rpm
- Ignition type: Flywheel magneto
- Transmission: Four-speed manual
- Frame type: Steel
- Suspension: Front: Leading-axle hydraulic forks, 5-inch travel Rear: Lay-down hydraulic shocks, 4.4-inch travel
- Brakes: Drum
- Tires: Front: 2.50-16 semi-knobby Rear: 3.00-14 semi-knobby
- Wheelbase: 1,135.38 mm (44.700 in)
- Seat height: 718 mm (28.3 in)
- Weight: 72 kg (159 lb) (dry)
- Fuel capacity: 6 L (1.3 imp gal; 1.6 US gal)
- Oil capacity: 0.9 L (0.20 imp gal; 0.24 US gal)
- Related: Honda XL250

The Honda XL80S was a dual-sport motorcycle made by Honda for five years starting in 1980. All models had metal fuel tanks and used the same engine. The XL80S looks like a dirt bike, and shares many characteristics with a dirt bike, but it is street-legal and intended for on- and off-road use.
