= Honda MR50 =

MR50
- Manufacturer: Honda
- Production: 1974–1975
- Class: Minibike
- Engine: 49 cc (3.0 cu in) air-cooled, two-stroke, single
- Ignition type: Breaker point
- Transmission: 3-speed manual

The Honda MR50 Elsinore is an off-road mini cycle made by Honda. It was manufactured in Japan by Honda and imported first to Australia and the United States in 1974 and continued to be available in the United States, Canada and Australia until production was discontinued in 1975.

It was patterned after the CR125 and CR250 Elsinores. Sometimes referred to as the Baby Elsinore, like its big brothers it had spoke wheels, knobby tires, and plastic fenders. The engine was a 49 cc (3.0 cu in), air-cooled, two-stroke with a 3 speed manual transmission. Starting was primary kick with the starter on the right side of the bike. The bike used conventional controls just like larger models. The shift pattern was neutral at the bottom and 3 up. Lubrication was premix at 25:1. The exhaust had a spark arrestor. The ignition used points. Parents could limit the speed the rider could go by placing an allen screw in 1 of 4 throttle stops on the throttle.

The 1974 model serial number begins MR50-100XXXX and was equipped with red fenders and the fuel tank was red with a black center stripe outlined with a black pinstripe. The 1975 model serial number begins MR50-200XXXX and sports red fenders with the more traditional Honda Elsinore silver tank with a red center stripe outlined with a black pinstripe. Many 1975 models were left over on showroom floors in the US longer than the 1975 season.

Today examples can be found in over 20 countries as collectors have bought them to add to their motorcycle collections.

Mike LaRocco owned one as his first bike.
