= Honda Express =

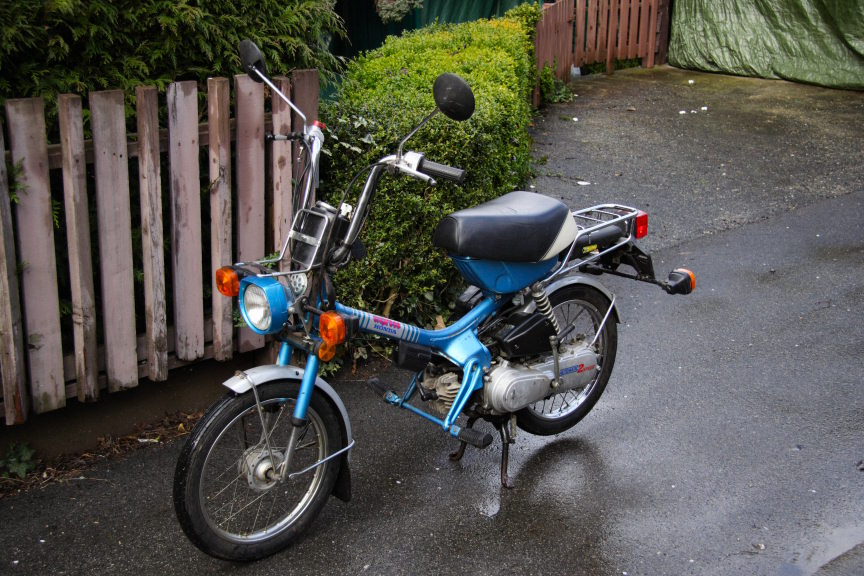
- 1982 Honda Express (NC50)
- Manufacturer: Honda
- Also called: Honda Road Pal
- Production: 1977–1983
- Class: Moped
- Engine: 49 cc (3.0 cu in), air-cooled, two-stroke, single
- Transmission: Continuously variable, single speed or two speed automatic transmission
- Brakes: Drum, front and rear
- Related: Express II, Express SR, Urban Express

The Honda Express or Honda NC50 is a scooter made by Honda between 1977 and 1983, based on the Honda NC50 Road Pal which was introduced in Japan in January 1976. Variants include the Express (NC50), Express II (NA50), Express SR (NX50) and Urban Express (NU50). All versions of the Express line are powered by an air-cooled 49 cc (3.0 cu in) two-stroke engine.

== Introduction ==
The Honda Motor Company of Japan released the Honda Road Pal (NC50) to the home market in January 1976. A renamed version called the Express arrived in the North American market in 1977. The new bike was designed to enter the large market for scooters that developed following the 1973 oil crisis. As such it came with a fuel-efficient single-cylinder two-stroke engine. It was also designed to be simple to operate, as many owners would be inexperienced with or intimidated by larger, more complex motorcycles. Honda accomplished this by using a fully automatic transmission and a small oil pump to self-mix the Express's oil and fuel, thus eliminating the need for premixing.

The Road Pal/Express was very successful and Honda continued to develop the concept. In April 1977 the Honda Varie appeared, equipped with a "Variomatic" style continuously variable transmission. Also a 49 cc light motorcycle, the Varie's more sophisticated transmission and sturdier design meant that its price was about two thirds more than that of the Road Pal. In 1981 the Express SR was introduced, also featuring a CVT transmission.

== Models ==
=== NC50 (1977–1983) ===
A 49cc "noped" (as it has no pedals unlike the PA50 Hobbit/Camino moped) which was manufactured from 1977 until 1983, it featured an air-cooled, oil-injected 2-stroke engine. The versions from 1977 to 1980 had a manual choke, points ignition, and a single speed transmission with a unique spring start system as opposed to a conventional kick start. Versions from 1981 onwards included capacitor discharge ignition, automatic choke and a conventional kick start mechanism, and then in 1982 a facelift brought a new body design and a 2-speed automatic transmission.

=== NA50 (1979–1981) ===
The NA50, or Express II, was released in 1979 and produced until 1981. Differences include a different frame, "more comfortable" seat, tree handle bars, and a slightly larger gas tank. For the NA50's final year of production in 1981, it received the same upgrades as the NC50 (CDI, auto choke, kick start) as well as a 2-speed automatic transmission.

=== NX50 (1981–1983) ===
The NX50, or Honda Express SR (also called the "Deluxe"), used a slightly different engine from the NC50 and NA50, being equipped with a belt driven, continuously variable transmission, larger reed valve block, and slightly different intake manifold alongside a body akin to a moped-scooter hybrid.

=== NU50 (1982–1983) ===
The NU50 and NU50M, or Honda Urban Express, replaced the Express II model for 1982 and was only produced until 1983. It utilized a similar belt driven, variated engine as in the NX50, however the belt side of the cases is longer and top speed is slightly higher. Most bikes run about 30 mph. The NU50M comes with an electric start, in addition to the regular urban express standard features, including; oil injection, blinkers, 12v battery, cdi ignition, an alternator, oil tank indicator, and beefier shocks and larger wheels than the regular express. A unique restricted version (NU50I) was produced just for the lower speed requirements to be sold in Iowa and other states with similar restriction; these models are limited to a maximum of 25mph from the factory.

== Chronology ==
- 1976 The Honda Road Pal (NC50) is introduced.
- 1977 It arrived in North America as the "Express".
- 1979 The Express II (NA50) is introduced alongside the Express. Both feature the same drivetrain, but the new model is built with a redesigned frame and larger seat.
- 1980 Turn signals and a larger battery to match are added.
- 1981 Both models see a series of improvements, including an automatic choke unit, a more rugged kick starter to replace the wind up starter, and a solid state Capacitor discharge ignition in place of the contact breaker based system. The Express II also receives an automatic two-speed transmission.
- Also new in 1981 is the Express SR (NX50). This is a scooter variant of the Express with a somewhat modified engine. It is the first Express to feature an electric starter, 12v electrical system and a Honda V-Matic continuously variable transmission.
- 1982 The Express receives a new frame design and the two speed transmission seen the previous year on the NA50. The Express II model is dropped, and a new model called the Urban Express (NU50) takes its place. This model features a frame similar to the NA50, and a drivetrain identical to the Express SR's, outside of its transmission gearing and electric starter. The Urban Express Deluxe (NU50m) is the same as the standard model, but comes with an electric starter and larger battery to operate it.
- 1983 This is the final year of the Express series in North America. The NC50 remains unchanged from its previous year. The Express SR is no longer available.
- 1984 This is the final year of the Express series in the United Kingdom.
