= Honda SS125A =

Motorcycle manufactured by Honda from 1967 through 1969

Honda SS125
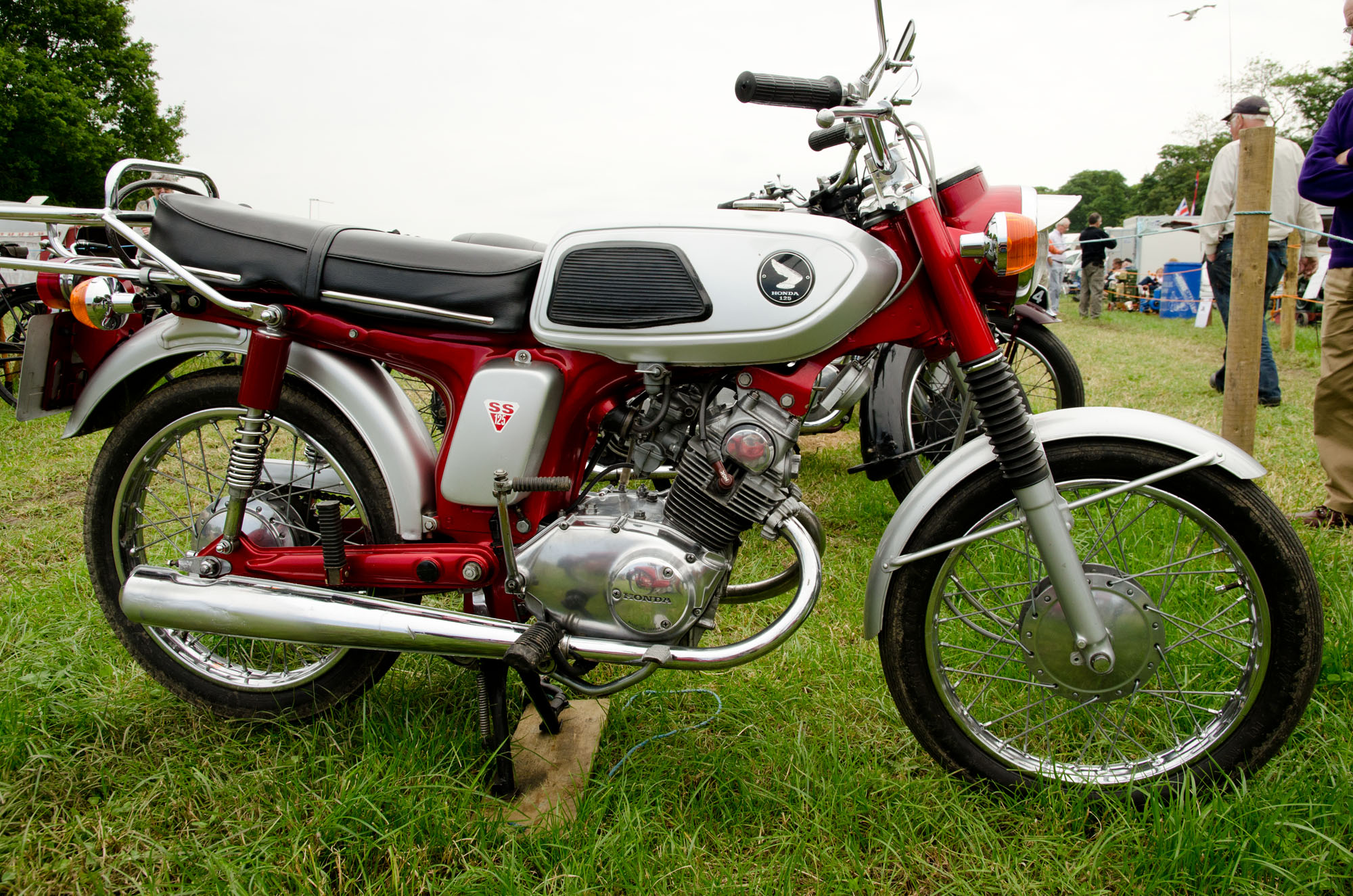
- 1969 Honda SS125
- Manufacturer: Honda
- Production: 1967–1969
- Assembly: Japan
- Predecessor: Honda CS125
- Successor: Honda CB125, CB125K
- Class: Standard
- Engine: 124 cc (7.6 cu in) air-cooled SOHC parallel twin
- Bore / stroke: 44 mm × 41 mm (1.7 in × 1.6 in)
- Compression ratio: 9.4:1
- Power: 13 PS (9.6 kW) @ 10,000 or 10,500 rpm
- Ignition type: Six volt points
- Transmission: 4-speed manual
- Frame type: Pressed steel "T-bone" type frame
- Suspension: Front: telescopic front fork; Rear: twin shocks
- Brakes: Single leading shoe drum front and rear
- Tires: Front: 2.75 x 17; Rear: 2.75 x 17
- Weight: 105 kg (231 lb) (dry)
- Fuel capacity: 8.2 L (1.8 imp gal; 2.2 US gal)
- Oil capacity: 1.2 L (0.26 imp gal; 0.32 US gal)

The Honda SS125A is a motorcycle manufactured by Honda from 1967 through 1969.

The SS125A was based on the Japan-only Honda CS125 along with two other variants, the CD125 and the CL125A, all three of which shared many common components with the CS125. The larger capacity CD175 was also similar in design, up to 1969, although with a more touring-oriented styling.

Although the variants shared common components, many were unique to this range and, combined with the relatively short production run, can make spare parts difficult to obtain today. Certain items, such as silencers (mufflers) for the low slung exhaust are very rare and command a premium when sold.

In spite of its stylish appearance, the motorcycle was criticised for lack of performance, and was effectively superseded by the CB125 in 1971.

== Specification ==
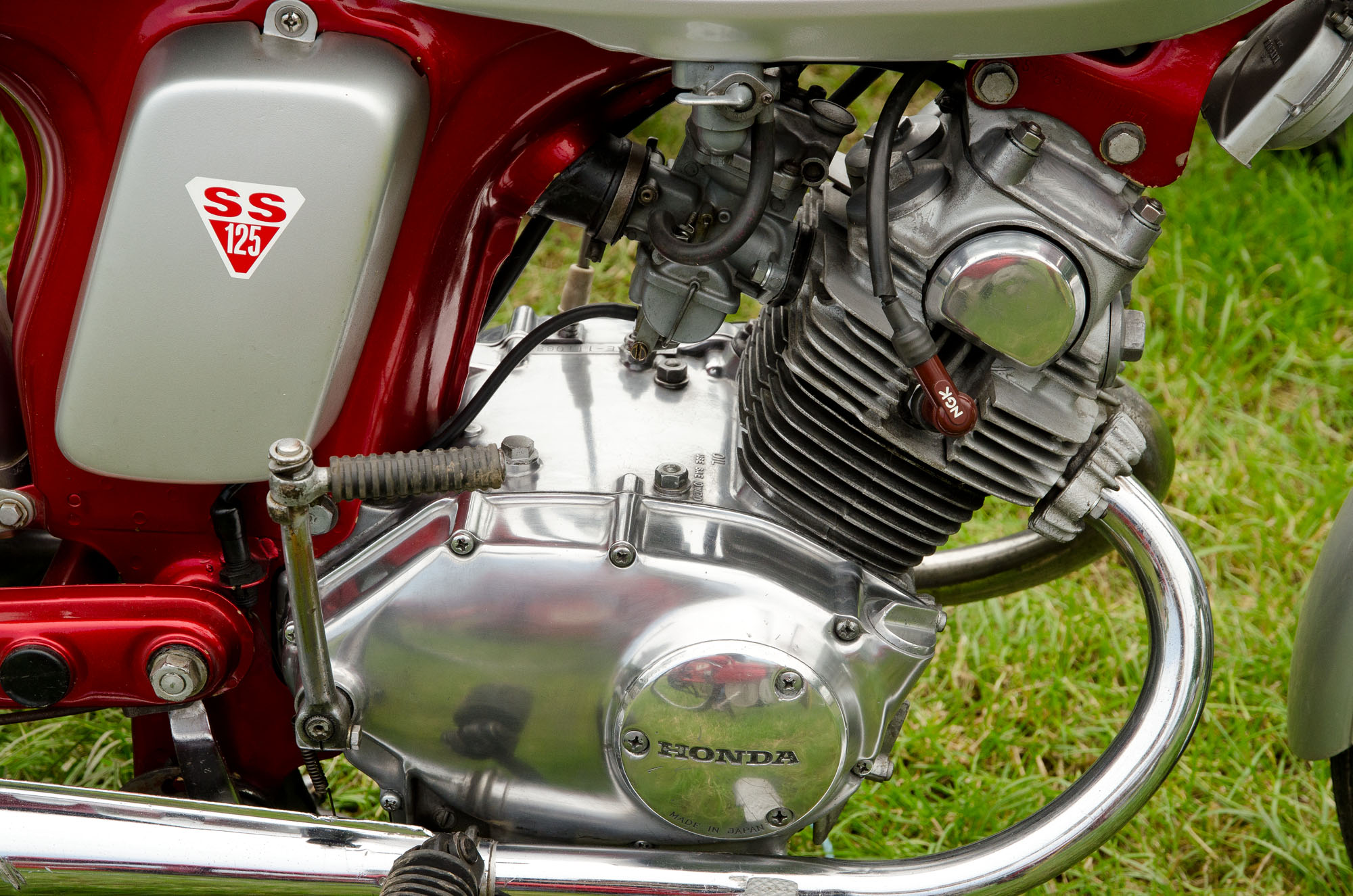
1969 Honda SS125 "sloper" engine

The SS125A had 17 inch wheels; the front rim was either 1.4 inches or 1.6 inches wide while the rear rim was 1.6 inches wide. The 124 cc twin cylinder engine was basically same as the earlier CA95/CB92 layout, using the left side of the engine for the timing chain to the camshaft. It used a Keihin Seiki vacuum carburetor, as opposed to the earlier engines, which were equipped with a slide valve type. The home market (Japan) version was built using a 180 degree crankshaft, as opposed to the 360 degree layout in the U.S.models.
