= Honda Vision =

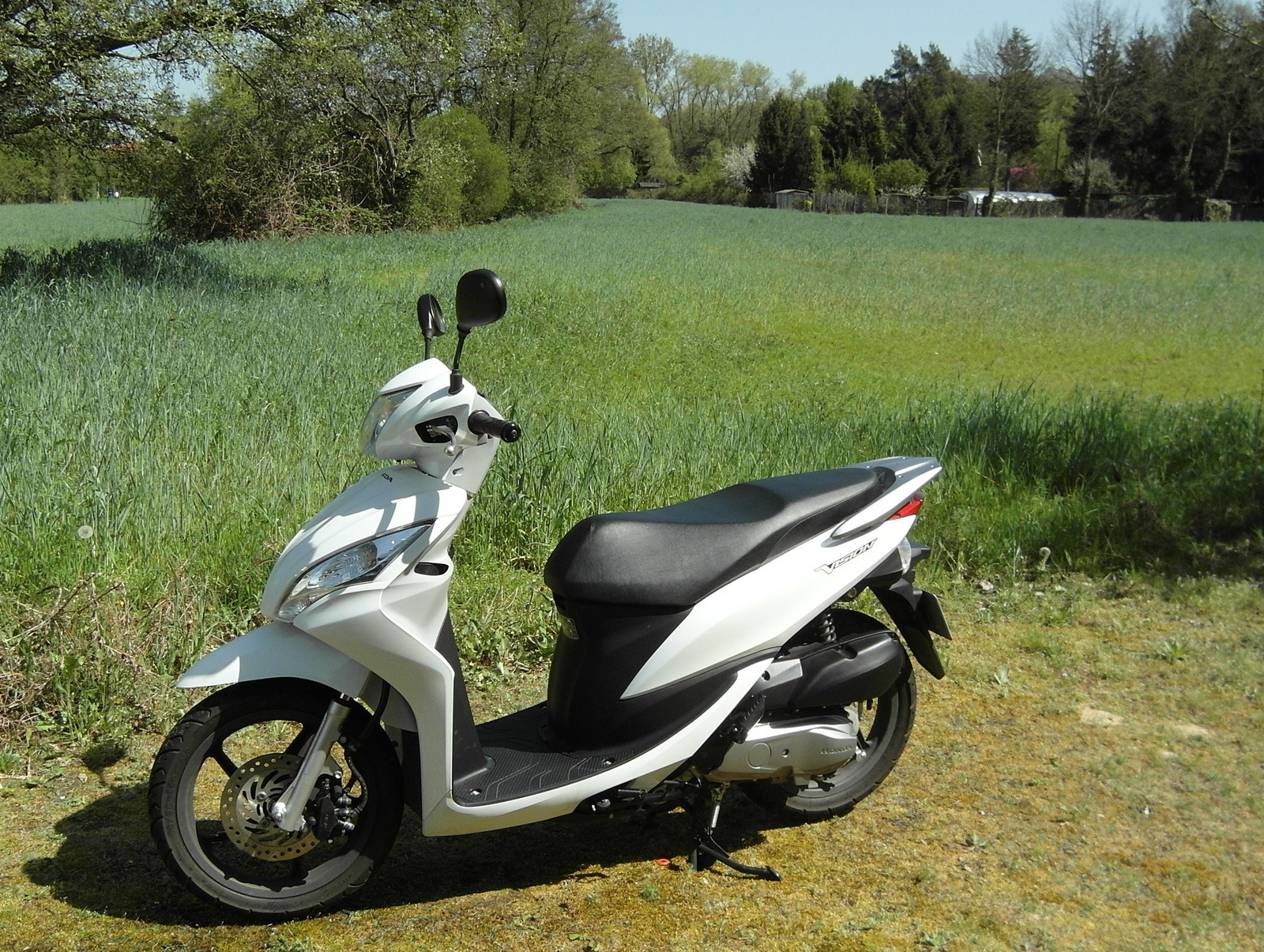
- Manufacturer: Honda Motor Company
- Also called: Honda Spacy
- Production: 1985–present
- Predecessor: Honda Dio
- Class: Scooter
- Engine: 110 cc (6.7 cu in), air-cooled, 4-stroke & 2 stroke variant for older models single
- Bore / stroke: 50 mm × 55 mm (2.0 in × 2.2 in)
- Compression ratio: 9.5:1
- Ignition type: Electronic
- Transmission: Automatic
- Frame type: Steel tube frame
- Suspension: 70 mm telescopic forks, 80 mm rear swingarm
- Brakes: Front: 220 mm (8.7 in) single hydraulic disc with 3-piston calipers and sintered metal pads Rear: 130 mm (5.1 in) drum
- Tires: 80/90-14 front, 90/90-14 rear
- Wheelbase: 1,255 mm (49.4 in)
- Dimensions: L: 1,845 mm (72.6 in); W: 670 mm (26 in); H: 1,090 mm (43 in)
- Seat height: 760 mm (30 in)
- Fuel capacity: 5.5 L (1.2 imp gal; 1.5 US gal)
- Fuel consumption: 2.0 L/100 km (140 mpg_{‑imp}; 120 mpg_{‑US}) (claimed)
- Turning radius: 1.94 m

The Honda NSC Vision is a scooter made by Honda that launched in 2011 as a simple, economical and easy to ride scooter. It achieves in excess of 140 mpg. Variants include the Honda NSC50 (EU) and Honda NSC110 (Worldwide).

All versions are powered by an air-cooled 49 or 108 cc four-stroke engine coupled to an automatic transmission. They are equipped with 14-inch wheels and Honda's Combined Braking System (CBS).

It gained a major update in 2016, with a slightly bigger (16-inch) front wheel, revised styling and an improved engine to conform to Euro emissions regulations.

The Vision had another update in 2021 to comply with Euro 5, including a significantly lighter frame, new ‘smart key’ ignition and slightly revised styling.

== Design ==
The Vision 110 is powered by a 108cc, air-cooled four-stroke single cylinder engine with fuel injection and a conventional Continuously Variable Transmission) twist ‘n’ go gearbox. It is largely under-stressed, with proven durability and reliability.

Its 5.2-litre fuel tank enables a range of 150 miles plus.

The two brake levers are mounted on the bars, the right operating the front, the left the rear. The front brake has a twin piston caliper disc brake, while the rear is a drum design. The scooter also features a Combined Braking System, in which the rear brake lever also partially operates the front brake for a more controlled stopping performance.

Leg protectors keep off some of the road spray. A bag can fit on the floorboard between the feet, secured with the luggage hook. Fold-down pillion pegs and grab handles aid a pillion rider.

An analogue speedometer on the handlebars containing a small LCD. Later versions get Smart key ignition. The seat lifts up to provide access to a secure underseat luggage compartment.

=== 2021 model ===
This year saw a major redesign. The air-cooled, SOHC single engine features a longer 63.1 mm stroke and narrower 47 mm bore. This increased the capacity marginally, from 108cc to 109.5cc. The compression ratio rose from 9.5:1 to 10:1, while power and torque were virtually unchanged. Peak power became 8.6 hp at 7500 rpm while torque was 5.9 ft/lbs at 5750 rpm. The engine included a Smart Power (eSP) system.

The engine has an idle-stop system allowing it shut off when the bike is stationary, boosting economy to 155 mpg. The fuel tank is smaller at 4.9l, but range remains about the same at around 160 miles.

The chassis (frame) became a pressed steel design, reducing wet weight to 100 kg. The wheelbase was fractionally shorter and the seat height increased to 785 mm.
