= Honda SL90 =

- Manufacturer: Honda
- Also called: Motosport 90
- Production: 1969
- Class: Dual-sport
- Engine: 89cc OHC single-cylinder four-stroke
- Transmission: 4-speed manual
- Frame type: Full duplex cradle

The Honda Motosport 90 or Honda SL90 was a street/trail Honda motorcycle with a high fender. Its engine was a single cylinder 89 cc, single overhead cam configuration. It had a 4-speed transmission and a manual clutch. It was produced only during the 1969 model year and was available in two colors: Candy Ruby Red and Candy Blue. It came with a silver fuel tank stripe and a chrome exhaust system. Its frame was silver with the front wheel measuring 19" and 17" for the rear wheel. The steel fenders matched the basic colors (red or blue).
