= Honda CY50 =

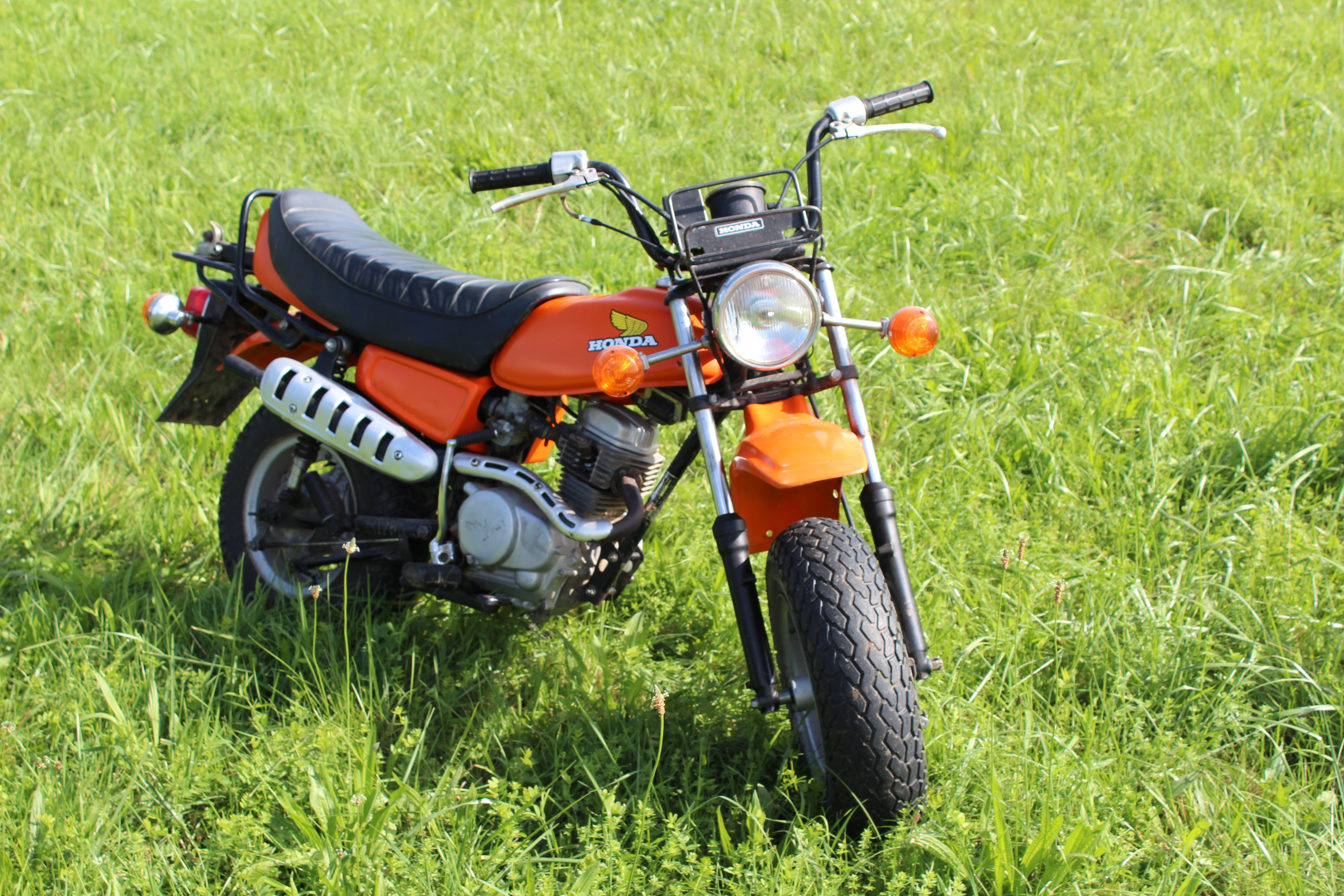
- Manufacturer: Honda Motor Company
- Production: 1977–1983
- Class: Moped
- Engine: 49 cc (3.0 cu in), air-cooled, four-stroke, singlep;rpm
- Compression ratio: 8.5:1
- Top speed: 40 km/h (25 mph)
- Power: 2.0 hp (1.5 kW) @ 5,500 rpm
- Torque: 0.28 kg-m @ 5,000 rpm

The Honda CY50 is a moped produced by the Japanese manufacturer Honda, which was sold from 1977 to 1983 as a successor to the Honda Dax in Germany. The unclad two-wheeler has an air-cooled single-cylinder engine with 50 cc displacement, the four-stroke engine has a power of 1.5 kW (2.1 hp). In contrast to the Dax with lying engine, the engine of the CY 50 is installed standing.

As a larger, but much rarer encountered model, the Honda CY 80 was imported. With comparable engine technology, the road version Honda CB 50 and the Enduro version XL 50 was built.

== Features ==
As a special feature was advertised that "... it does not need a fuel-oil mixture, but regular gasoline. This keeps the engines clean right up to the exhaust. Typical of the 4-stroke technology are the rich, round run and the low gas consumption. And what's going on, lasts long These mokicks have the great technology of Honda."

Especially for the German market with its then road traffic licensing order (StVZO), the engine with a speed limiter was provided, which together with populated spark plug, the preset ignition timing, the carburetor and the translation of everything delivered Standard allowed only a maximum speed of around 40 km/h. From the motorcycle area adopted detail solutions such as tubular frame, tank, seat, side cover and Helmbefestigungsmöglichkeit and the four-stroke engine with cylinder, overhead camshaft and right manual gearbox with wet clutch made her a miniature motorcycle, The designer's ""Naughty Dax"" as the CY 50 in the Honda advertisement was called had developed for this model various, also in the production adopted improvements, which in the products of the competition in addition to the above-described four-stroke technology at that time still missing. For example, the five-fold adjustable rear struts to adjust the spring preload to the payload, a trip meter in speedometer and a six-liter tank, which allowed a range of about 200 kilometers.

Rear and front luggage carriers themselves allowed a versatile labor input, for example, in the transport of various hobby equipments. Unscrewable front and rear wheel rims allow comprehensive care, immediate hose repair and a light coat change in trouble-free self-assembly.

== Vulnerabilities ==
A weak point of the model are the factory-rigid mounting tubes of the front and rear turn signals, which is why it already comes in light falls to significant damage, especially on the front indicators and their suspension (see picture).

The valve seats with valve rings manufactured at that time and the installed valves require that the engine be lead predominantly or at least occasionally with tetraethyl lead which is no longer available at service stations normal and premium gasoline is driven. A declaration by the manufacturer authorized statement that prolonged operation without lead added in the fuel will definitely damage the engine concerned sooner or later is not known. However, from a list posted by Honda on the Internet, it can be seen that the CY50 can also be run on regular unleaded gasoline.

The design-related performance of generator (flywheel generator) with six-volt electrics was not designed to ensure that this Mokick is always driven with switched on lighting in the Federal Republic of Germany, as required by later amendments to StVO. Therefore, with this alternator under this driving mode, especially in the case of predominantly short-distance traffic, the optimum charging of the standard accumulators (on-board battery 6 V, 4 Ah) while driving no longer guaranteed, which may lead after some time with each 21-watt bulbs (6 V) operated turn signals lose their function.

The standard delivery tank cover, which was standard at least in Germany, could not be locked. In addition, heard as a signal generator in this country only a bicycle bell to the basic equipment.

== Cult status ==
Today, the Honda CY 50 has become a collector's item and has a cult status.

There is a homepage dedicated to the Honda CY 50, CB 50 and XL 50. With many details, information and download s are provided; in the linked forum the everyday problems after the long lifetime of the "Oldtimers" discussed and answered; In addition, measures are described to upgrade the old small motorcycles to the latest standards (such as safety, electrical and power).
