= Honda CRF150R =

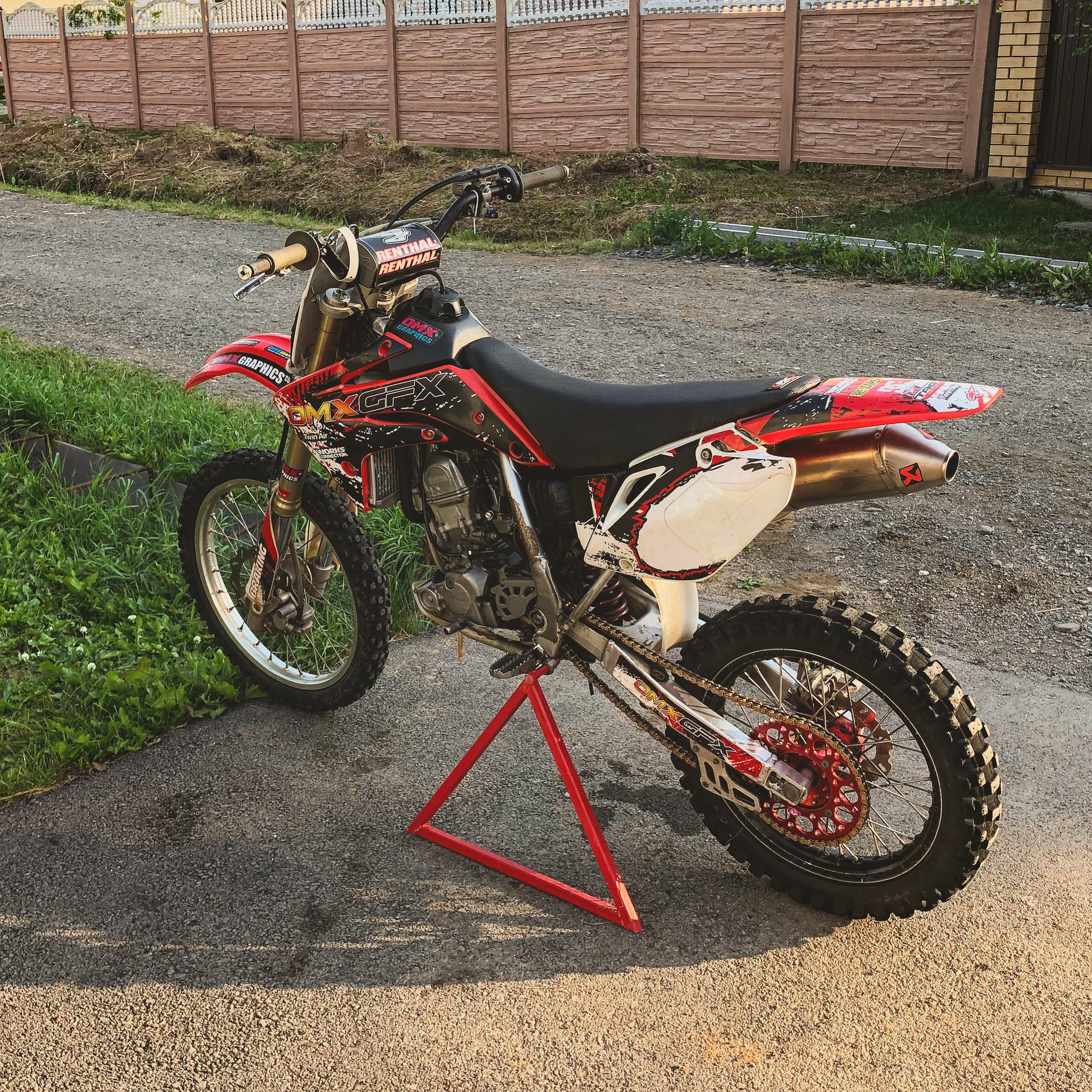
- Manufacturer: Honda
- Production: 2007–present
- Predecessor: Honda CR85R
- Class: Motocross
- Engine: 149 cc (9.1 cu in), Liquid-Cooled, single-cylinder, four stroke
- Transmission: 5–speed manual
- Suspension: Front: 37mm Showa Fork; Rear: Pro-Link Single Shock
- Brakes: Front: Single 240mm disc Rear: Single 190mm Disc
- Tires: 70/100-19. Rear: 90/100-16
- Rake, trail: 27° 48′
- Wheelbase: 50.6 in (1,290 mm)
- Seat height: 32.8 in (830 mm) (small wheel); 34.0 in (860 mm) (big wheel)
- Fuel capacity: 1.14 gallons
- Related: Honda CRF250R; Honda CRF150F

The Honda CRF150R is a racing motocross bike that was released in 2006 for the 2007 model year. It competes in the Mini Class against many 85 cc (5.2 cu in) two-stroke bikes; however, it cannot race in the 85cc mod. or stock class. It must race in the Supermini class. All of Honda's 2008 models are four-strokes whereas in years past, some of their racing bikes were two-strokes. The 150R features a Unicam four-valve liquid-cooled engine that produces power at a wide RPM range. And weighs 185 pounds wet (with fluids). It features fully adjustable Showa suspension, Dunlop Tires and disc brakes front and rear. The CRF150R come in two versions: the regular and the Expert.

The Expert costs an extra $100 and offers several new features specifically for larger riders. These include a taller seat height, higher ground clearance, larger wheelbase, increased tire size, longer swing arm and larger rear sprocket for better acceleration with a heavier rider. All of these Expert features add an additional 4 pounds. This model is referred to as the CRF150RB R meaning Race, and B meaning Big wheel.

== Specifications ==
All specifications are manufacturer claimed.

	2007	2008	2007	2008
Model	CRF150R		CRF150R Expert (CFR150RB)	
Engine
Engine Type	149 cc (9.1 cu in) Liquid-cooled single cylinder four-stroke			
Bore/Stroke	66 mm (2.6 in) x 43.7 mm (1.72 in)			
Compression Ratio	11.7:1			
Valve Train	Unicam			
Carburetion	Keihin 32mm flat side with throttle position sensor (TPS)			
Ignition	Solid-state CD with electronic advance			
Drivetrain
Transmission	Close-Ratio Five Speed Manual			
Final Drive	#420 steel chain, 15T/50T		#420 steel chain, 15T/56T	
Chassis/Suspension/Brakes
Front Suspension	37 mm fully adjustable leading-axle inverted Showa cartridge fork; 10.8 in (274 mm) travel			
Rear Suspension	Pro-Link fully adjustable Showa single shock; 10.8 in (274 mm) travel		Pro-Link fully adjustable Showa single shock; 11.5 in (292 mm) travel	
Front Brakes	Single 240 mm Disc			
Rear Brakes	Single 190 mm Disc			
Front Tire	70/100-17		70/100-19	
Rear Tire	90/100-14		90/100-16	
Dimensions
Rake	27.02 degrees		27.48 degrees	
Trail	78.0 mm (3.07 in)		96.0 mm (3.78 in)	
Wheelbase	49.6 in (1,260 mm)		50.6 in (1,285 mm)	
Seat Height	32.8 in (833 mm)		34.1 in (866 mm)	
Ground Clearance	11.9 in (302 mm) Brady		13.3 in (338 mm)	
Dry Weight	165.3 lb (75.0 kg)		169.7 lb (77.0 kg)	
Fuel Capacity	1.14 US gallons (4.3 L; 0.95 imp gal)			

== See also ==
- CRF Series
