= Honda Phantom =

Honda Phantom TA200 (Custom 3 / 4 / Fire Edition)
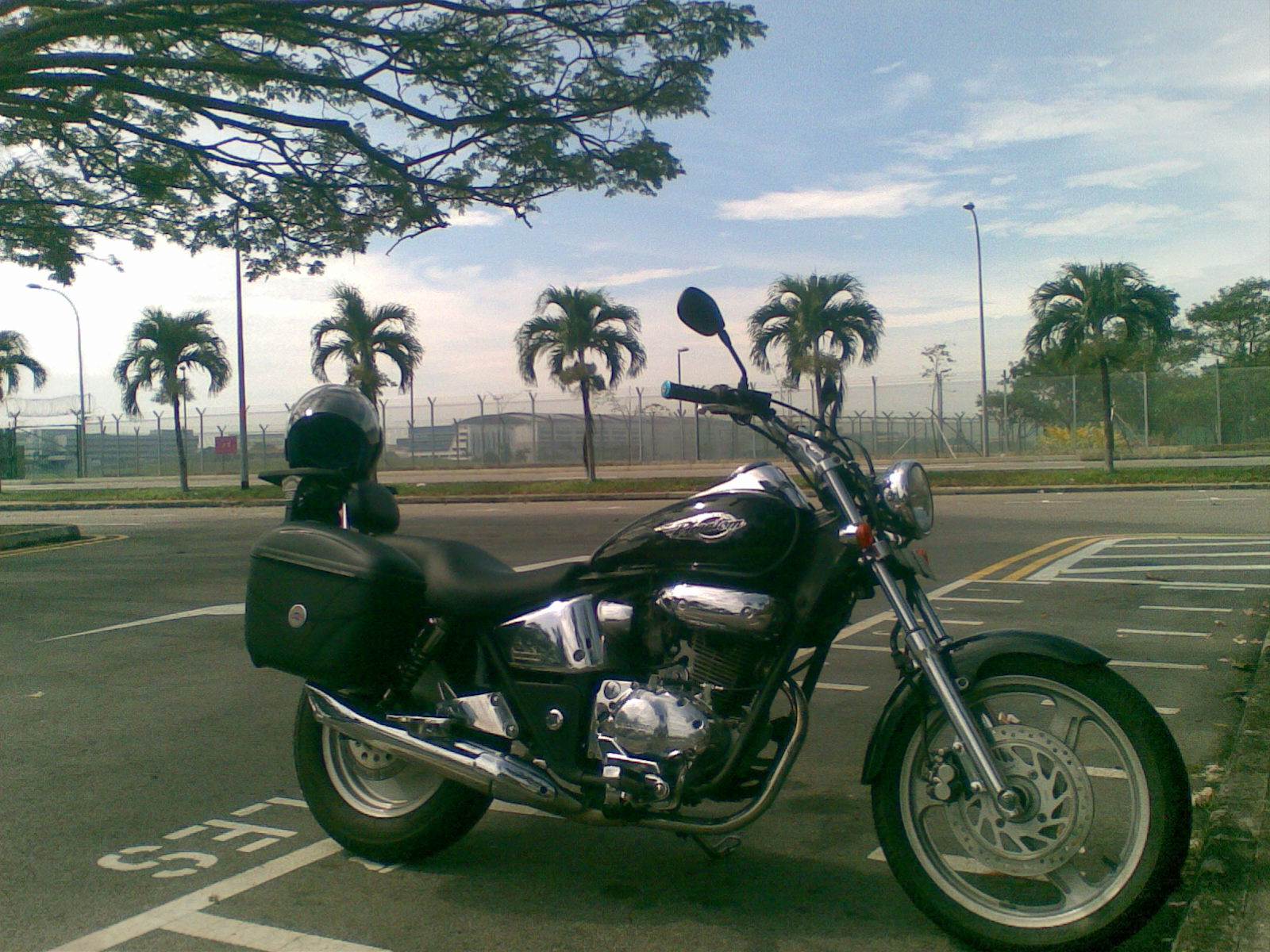
- Manufacturer: Honda
- Production: 2001–2010
- Assembly: Assembled in Thailand
- Class: "retro cruiser" type frame, inspired by classic American designs
- Engine: 4-stroke, 196.9 cc, air-cooled, 2-valve SOHC with a compression ratio of 9.0:1
- Transmission: 6-speed sequential
- Wheelbase: 1,505 mm (59.3 in)
- Dimensions: L: 2,256 mm (88.8 in); W: 775 mm (30.5 in); H: 1,085 mm (42.7 in)
- Weight: 140 kg (310 lb) (dry)
- Related: Honda Mega Pro

The Honda Phantom TA150

is a single cylinder Thai-made "retro cruiser" motorcycle. It was known in Australia as the TA Shadow. Production of the TA200 was stopped in Thailand on 3 March 2010.

Overall design was very similar to the Honda TA150. The major differences was that the TA200 contains a four-stroke engine and higher 197 cc displacement.

This motorcycle was very popular in Singapore due to it being one of the few cruisers available for a class 2B license (the most basic motorcycle license in Singapore). Class 2B license holders are only allowed to ride motorcycles with displacement below 200 cc.

== Specifications ==
- Engine Type: 4-stroke Single-cylinder, air-cooled, 2-valve SOHC
- Displacement: 196.9 cc
- Bore x Stroke 63.5 mm x 62.2 mm
- Compression Ratio: 9.0:1
- Ignition System: CDI
- Redline: Unknown - early TA200s (Custom 3? Short handlebar version) up to 2004 have NO rev limiter
- 6-speed gearbox (Conventional motorcycle 1N23456)
- Clutch System: Wet Multiplate Clutch
- Drivetrain: Chain (520)
- Sprockets (Front / Rear tooth count): 13 / 39 or 41 (standard)
- Dimensions (WxLxH): 775 x 2256 x 1085 mm
- Seat Height: 699 mm
- Wheelbase: 1505 mm
- Front Tire: 90/90R17 / 49P.
- Rear Tire: 130/90R15 / 66P.
- Dry Weight: 140 kg
- Fuel Tank Capacity (Total / Reserve): 9.68 litres / 2 litres
- MPG: City riding (2 pax), 48 mpg, 17 km per L, Highway riding 75 mpg, 26 km per L; City/Highway riding (1 pax), 87 mpg, 37 km per L (avg)
- Suspension System: Front - Telescopic, Rear, Double Shock
- Brake System: Front / Rear Disc Brakes (Dual Piston Calipers)
- Tyre Size: Front - 90/90 - 17M / C49P (Tubeless); Rear - 130/90 15M / C66P (Tubeless), available from Metzeler (Lasertec), Pirelli (City Demon), Bridgestone (Exedra), IRC (from Thailand) and Shinko (with white-walled option)
- Battery: Maintenance-Free 12V - 3.5Ah
- Max. Power Output: 12.3 kW / 16.48 hp @ 8000 rpm
- Max. Torque: 16.2 nm / 11.95 lb-ft @6500 rpm
