= Honda Chaly =

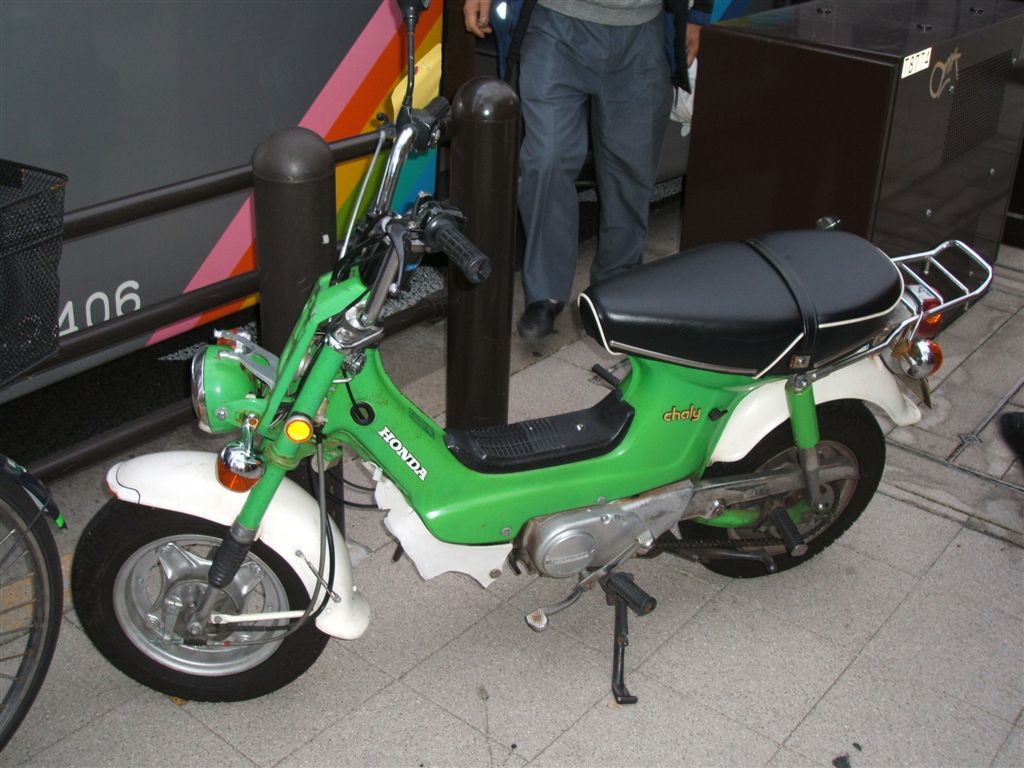
- Manufacturer: Honda
- Production: 1972-2000
- Class: Minibike

The Honda Chaly is a minibike that was produced by Honda between 1972 and 2000.

== History ==
Like many Japanese cars and motorbikes, the Chaly's name is a neologism. It was officially released in Japan on July 18, 1972. Three versions were released the same year under the names 50-I CF, 50-II CF and 70 CF (the numbers indicate the displacement of either 49 or 72 cc). In light of article R 311-1 of the French Highway Code of 30 April 2009, depending on the engine, this two-wheeler is a moped or a light motorcycle.

Initially sold with a platinum screw ignition, it inaugurated an electrical system equipped with a CDI with a more powerful 72 cc engine in 1981.

== Description ==
Similar in design to the Honda Dax which saw the light of day in 1969, the Chaly is designed to be easy to drive by the whole family and is in line with a series of small motorcycles produced by the Japanese manufacturer since the famous Honda Z100 produced in series from 1963. The Chaly, like the Dax, differs from this series of mini motorcycles by its one-piece enveloping frame, both bodywork and support for the various mechanical components.

The Chaly differs from its elder Dax by a V-shaped frame, guaranteeing better comfort for women and which gives it a more utilitarian use, particularly on the Asian market where it can also be equipped with a fixed basket on its fork crown. The Chaly and the Dax have in common a horizontal single-cylinder 4-stroke engine with two valves and an overhead camshaft, small ten-inch wheels, two drum brakes (the front operated by a handlebar handle, the rear by a pedal on the right foot, except for the first CF50I model reserved for the Japanese market), a compact and robust architecture as well as a semi-automatic three-speed gearbox. The gears are changed using a dual-branch selector lever on the left foot. The design of this semi-automatic motor does not require the manual use of a clutch handle, which makes its use simplified.

This small engine block, fitted with a 6 V electrical system, is appreciated more for its discretion, low fuel consumption, flexibility and strength than for its power. The smaller engine develops 3.2 PS (2.4 kW), while the 72 cc variant delivers 4.2 PS (3.1 kW) (for the Japanese market CF50-II and CF70-II, 1979 models).

The Chaly's compact size brings it below the 75 kilogram mark. Its compactness makes it suitable to drive in an urban environment, and easy to board a car, a motorhome, or a boat.
