= Honda CJ series =

Honda motorcycle series

One of the short-lived lines of Honda motorcycle is the CJ Series, which was an offshoot of the short-lived CB360. The CJ series motorbikes have inline engines, of a nominal 360cc capacity.

== CJ360T ==
CJ360T
- Engine: 356.8 cc (21.77 cu in), fourstroke, air-cooled, upright twin
- Bore / stroke: 67 mm × 50.6 mm (2.64 in × 1.99 in)
- Compression ratio: 9.3:1
- Transmission: 5-speed
- Suspension: Front: telescopic Rear: swingarm
- Brakes: Front: Single disc Rear: drum
- Wheelbase: 1.374 m (4 ft 6.1 in)
- Seat height: 0.762 m (2 ft 6.0 in)
- Ground clearance: 0.152 m (6.0 in)

The Honda CJ360T was a twin cylinder four-stroke motorcycle produced from 1976 to 1977. Evolving from the successful CB360 Twin. The CJ360T was a less expensive version of the CB360, with a five-speed gearbox (instead of six on the CB), front drum brake rather than disc brake, a 2-into-1 exhaust and was kick-start only (the CB had electric and kick start). The 360 engine was tuned for broad range torque.

The model had a short manufacturing life from 1976 to 1977 and did not gain market success. The poor acceptance resulted from several factors including:

- Poor marketing on Honda's part
- Smaller gear box (5 rather than 6 speeds)
- Apparent lower performance than competitors' two stroke models of similar capacity, notably Yamaha RD350. However, it had the reliability and economy of a four cycle engine.

The only differences between the 1976 and 1977 model years were cosmetic. The 1976 model was offered in Candy Antares Red. The 1977 model carried over the same color with orange stripes added along the fuel tank and rear cowl.

== CJ250T ==
The CJ250T, which was not sold in the US, was offered in Parakeet Yellow and Tahitian Red.
