= Honda TR200 =

TR200 "Fatcat"
- Manufacturer: Honda
- Production: 1986–1987
- Engine: 199 cc (12.1 cu in) 4-stroke, 2 valve, air-cooled, SOHC, single
- Transmission: 5-speed, automatic clutch
- Suspension: Front: 5.9" telescopic fork Rear: 4.7" single shock absorber swingarm
- Brakes: Front and rear drum
- Tires: Rear: 23.5x8.00-11 Front: 24.5x8.00-11
- Wheelbase: 53.7 in (1,360 mm)
- Dimensions: L: 79.5 in (2,020 mm); W: 32.3 in (820 mm)
- Seat height: 29.7 in (750 mm)
- Weight: 264 lb (120 kg) (dry)
- Fuel capacity: 1.9 US gal (7.2 L; 1.6 imp gal)

The Honda TR200 series of bikes was produced only in 1986 and 1987. The engine was a 199 cc (12.1 cu in) four-stroke OHC single linked to a five-speed transmission and automatic clutch. It featured lever actuated drum brakes on both wheels. This bike was unique in that it used two ATV-type tires. Presently complete bikes are quite uncommon, though replacement parts are readily available as they interchange with other Honda ATCs.

== Sources ==
- Big Wheel Showdown - Yamaha BW200ES vs. Honda TR200 Fat Cat Dirt Bike Magazine
