= Honda SFX50 =

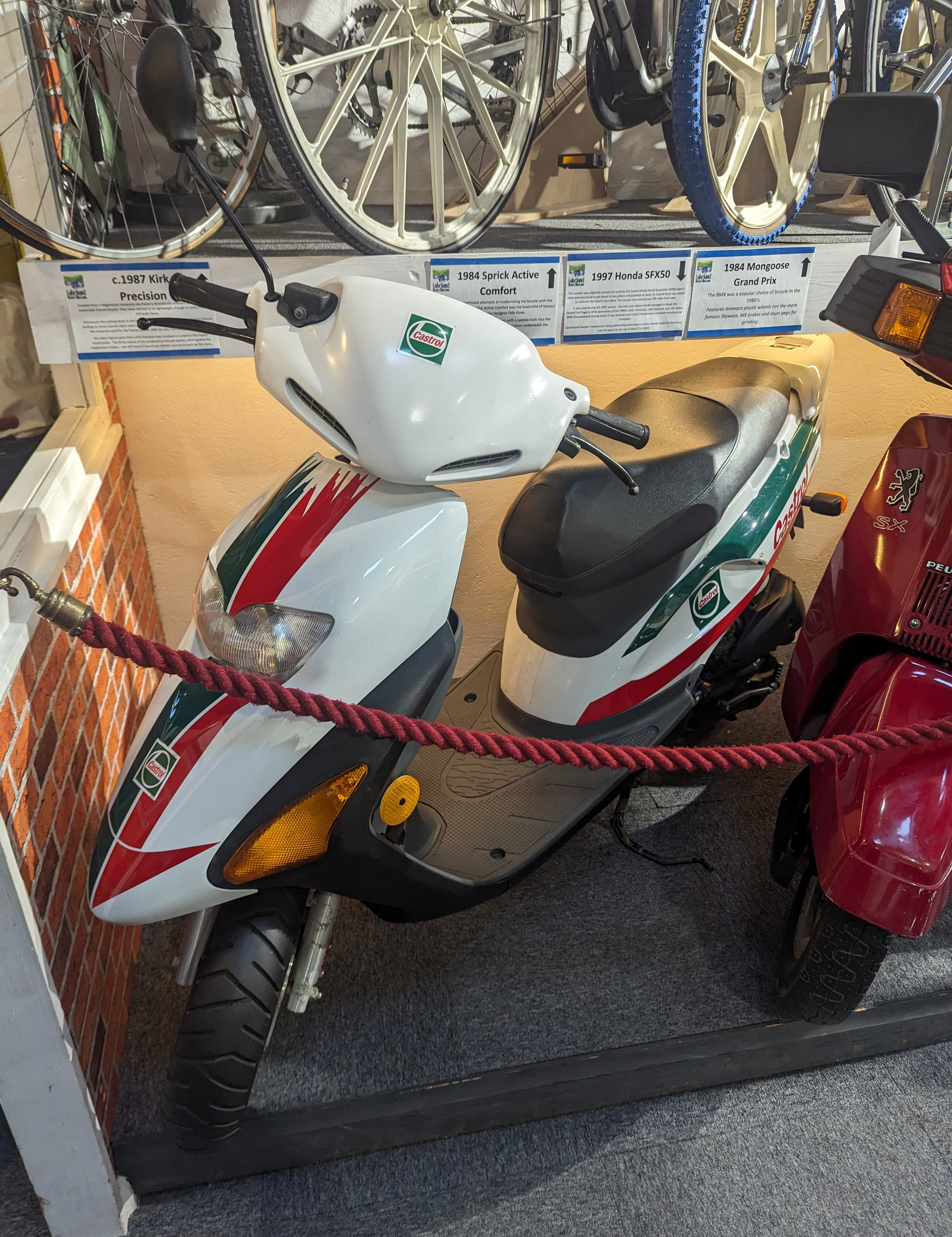
- 1997 Honda SFX50 Moped
- Manufacturer: Honda Motor Company
- Production: 1995–2004
- Class: Moped
- Engine: 49 cc (3.0 cu in) air-cooled, two-stroke, single
- Bore / stroke: 39 mm × 41.4 mm (1.54 in × 1.63 in)
- Top speed: 50 km/h (31 mph)
- Ignition type: Capacitor discharge electronic ignition, electric and kick start
- Transmission: Continuously variable transmission, belt final drive, (Honda V-matic transmission)
- Suspension: Telescopic front; swingarm with single shock absorber rear
- Brakes: Single disc front, drum rear
- Tires: 90/90 x 10 front and rear
- Wheelbase: 1.215 m (47.8 in)
- Dimensions: L: 1.723 m (67.8 in); W: .636 m (25.0 in); H: 1.064 m (41.9 in)
- Seat height: .755 m (29.7 in)
- Weight: 71 kg (157 lb) (dry)
- Fuel capacity: 6 L (1.3 imp gal; 1.6 US gal)
- Ground clearance: .116 m (4.6 in)

The Honda SFX50 is a 49 cc (3.0 cu in), two stroke, air-cooled, single cylinder, scooter-style moped manufactured between 1995 and 2004 by the Honda Motor Company. It complied with the United Kingdom licence restrictions of the time and was equipped with continuously variable automatic transmission (Honda V-Matic Transmission) and capacitor discharge electronic ignition.

The front disc, and rear drum brakes, were operated pedal-cycle style by handle-bar levers and the machine also had oil pump reservoir lubrication, thus avoiding the need to pre-mix two-stroke engine oil. Electrics were 12 volt and it had both electric and primary-kick start and an automatic choke.

Other aspects included a dual seat, with locking under-seat storage, a storage pocket on the inside of the front fairing and a centre stand. A handlebar mounted binnacle forming part of the front upper bodywork contained basic instrumentation.
