= Honda Rancher =

All-terrain vehicle manufactured by Honda

The Honda Rancher is an All-Terrain Vehicle manufactured by Honda, and is one of the model line of ATV's. Currently there are two generations of the TRX420 which differ significantly in design and features.

== TRX350 (2000 - 2006) ==
The first model to bear the Rancher name was the TRX350. Stepping up from the smaller TRX300, Honda introduced the Rancher 350 to be a better model to be in between the smaller Recon and Larger Foreman.

== TRX420 (2007 - 2013) ==
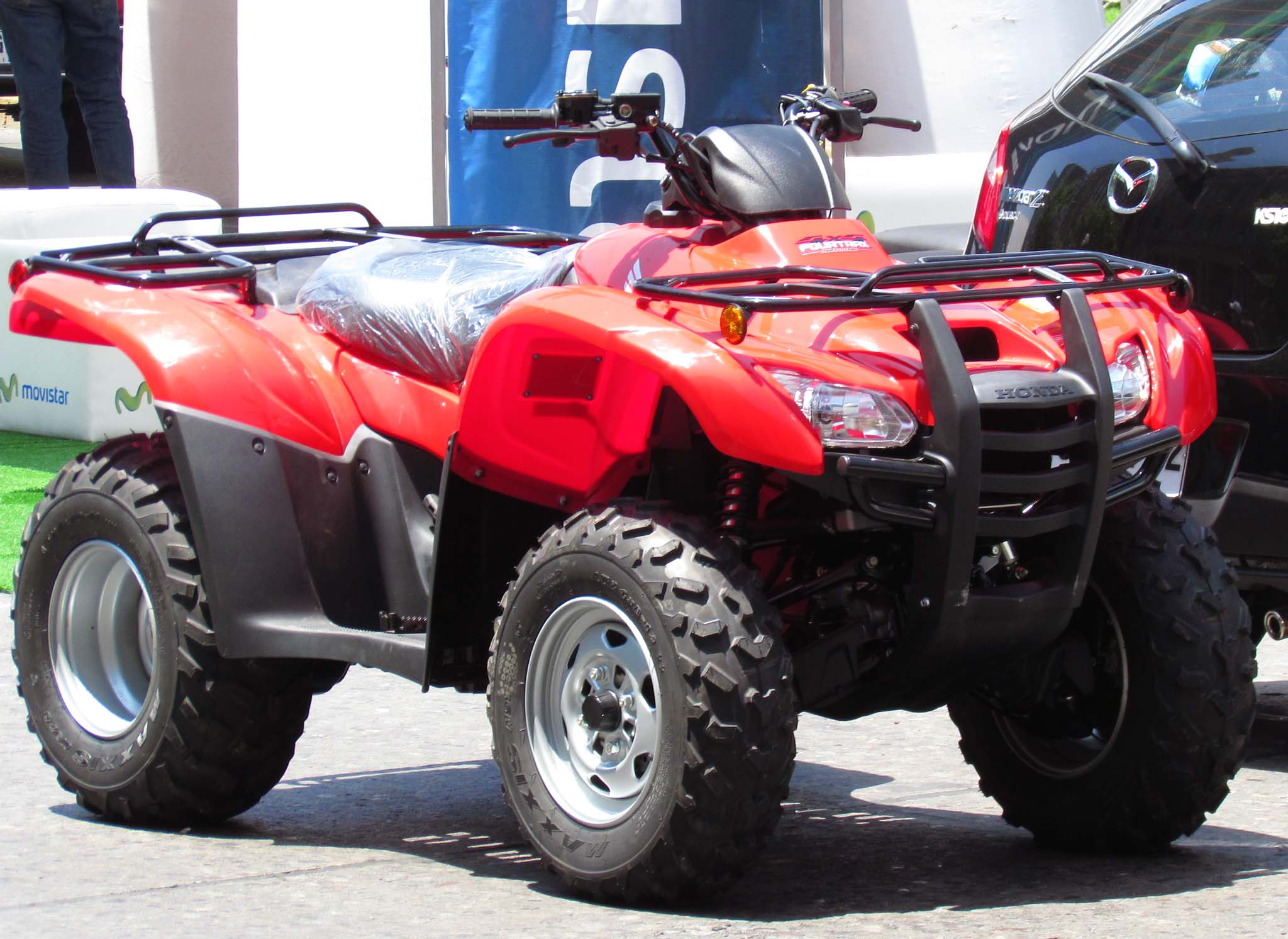
First Generation TRX420 Rancher

Following the previous Rancher ATV models (TRX350 & TRX400) Honda completely redesigned the Rancher line to improve all aspects of the ATV. Changes included a bigger and more powerful 420cc single-cylinder, 4-stroke engine, electronic Programmed Fuel Injection (PGM-FI), liquid cooling, and the ability to change from 2WD to 4WD on equipped models.

For the 2007 model year the TRX420 was only available in four configurations being either 2WD or 4WD and shifting with a manual foot shift or using Honda's Electronic Shift Program (ESP). However, in 2008 Honda introduced the TRX420FA (4WD Automatic) also known as the Rancher AT, as well as electronic power steering. Although the previous generation rancher was available with an automatic transmission, the TRX420 AT and the TRX400 transmissions differed greatly. The previous automatic transmission known as the Hondamatic Transmission utilized oil pressure and a swash plate to constantly change output ratios, therefore eliminating the need to shift. The new automatic transmission utilized a simpler dual clutch design, allowing for quick and smooth shifting while being more reliable than the Hondamatic. Although no changes were made to the engine, the transmission was significantly larger due to the dual clutch design, causing the FA models and the standard models to have different oil filters and oil capacities.

The standard suspension design for the TRX420 utilized a swingarm with a solid axle driving power to the rear wheels. The TRX420FA however came standard with independent rear suspension, providing more ground clearance, better traction, and overall a smoother ride.

== TRX420 (2014 - present) ==
The 2014 model year brought a redesigned rancher on the market. Although the engine and transmission remained unchanged, most of the ATV had been updated or redesigned. Changes included a new body and frame, a new in-tank fuel pump design, an updated instrument cluster, and later on a new utility rack design. Due to the fuel pump being moved to inside the fuel tank, the filler cap was also moved and the fuel shut-off valve was removed. For 2014 the Rancher AT was only available in the first generation design. It was not until 2015 when the Rancher AT would be updated along with the standard models. Similar to the previous design, the TRX420FA came standard with independent rear suspension.

For the 2020 model year, Honda redesigned the utility racks to be utilized with the new Honda Pro-Connect™ accessory line. Along with the new rack design, the front fender was altered to fit a storage compartment under the front rack.
