= Honda Bali (SJ 100) =

Gas-powered scooter manufactured by Honda

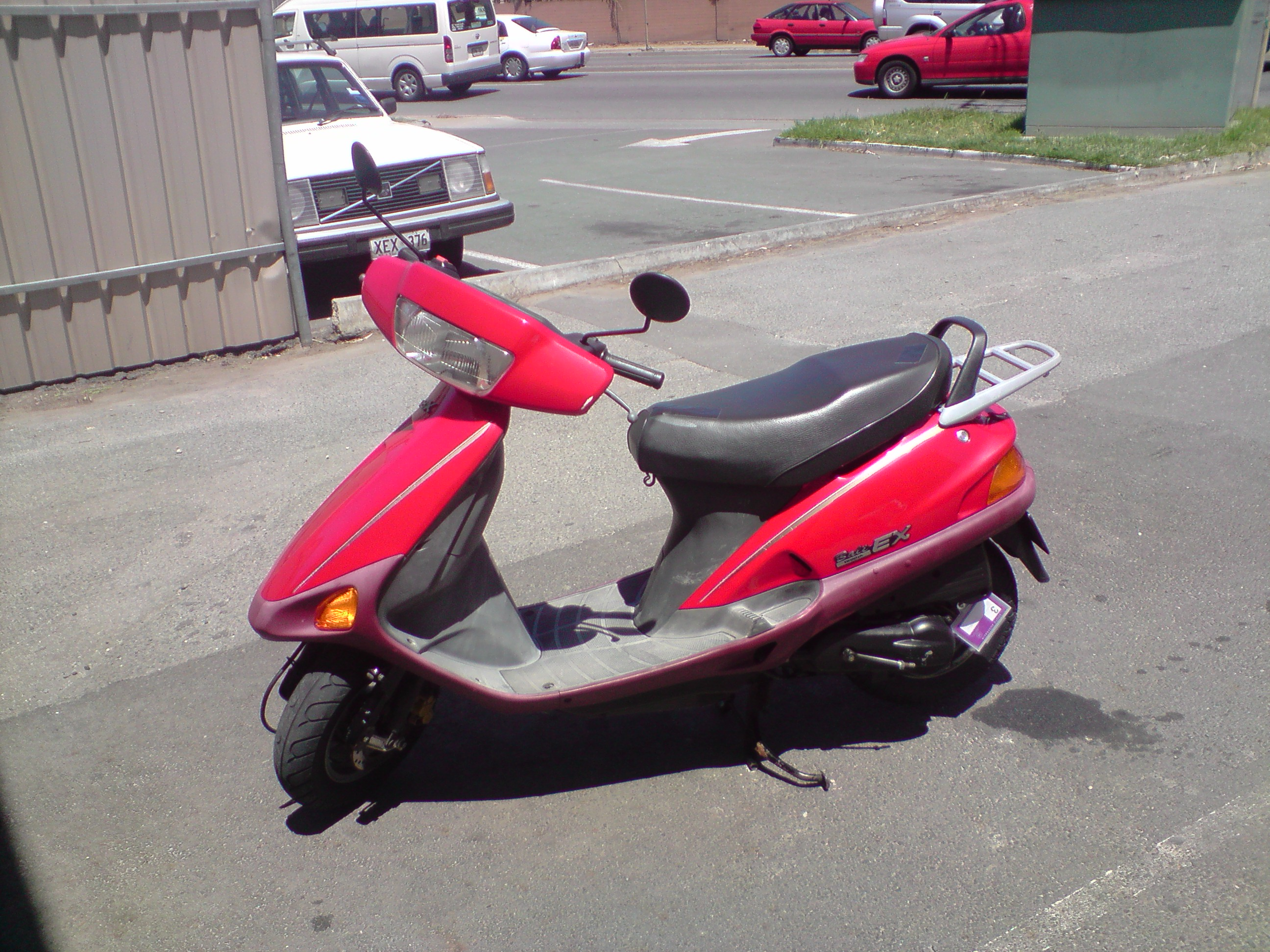
- Manufacturer: Honda Motor Company
- Also called: SJ 100
- Production: 1993-2001
- Assembly: Atessa, Italy
- Successor: Honda @
- Class: Scooter
- Engine: 100 cc (6.1 cu in), two-stroke, single
- Ignition type: Electric start
- Wheelbase: 1,260 mm (50 in)
- Dimensions: L: 1,765 mm (69.5 in); W: 712 mm (28.0 in); H: 1,115 mm (43.9 in)
- Fuel capacity: 7 L (1.8 US gal)

The Honda Bali is a 100 cc (6.1 cu in) two-stroke twist and go scooter from Honda. The scooter has self-starter and autolub system to mix two-stroke oil with fuel. The top speed with 85 kg load is around 80 km/h. Front brake is disc while rear is drum.

The scooter weighs around 93 kg, Fuel capacity is 7 liters and oil capacity (two-stroke oil) is 1.2 liters. Its automatic dry centrifugal clutch is driven by V-belt. Engine compression ratio is 6:1.

This Scooter is produced by Honda Italia Industriale in Atessa, Italy since March 1993.
