= Honda Rincon =

The Honda Rincon is a model of small ATVs manufactured by Honda. There have been two models, launched in 2003 and 2006. The vehicle is designed as a recreational all-terrain vehicle (ATV), rather than a utility or sport version. The Rincon model differs greatly from the other Honda ATV models in that it has always had independent rear suspension and a much larger engine, but most notable is the transmission design as the Rincon is a 3-speed automatic with a torque converter while other models are equipped with constant mesh manual transmissions.

== Rincon Generation 1 (2003–2005) ==
Rincon

Overview
- Manufacturer: Honda
- Model years: 2003-2005

Powertrain
- Engine: 649cc liquid-cooled OHV semi-dry-sump longitudinally mounted single-cylinder four-stroke
- Transmission: Automatic with hydraulic torque converter, three forward gears, reverse, and electronic controls

Dimensions
- Wheelbase: 50.8 inches (129 cm)
- Length: 83.7 inches (213 cm)
- Width: 46.1 inches (117 cm)
- Height: 47.5 inches (121 cm)
- Curb weight: 600 pounds (270 kg)

Chronology
- Successor: 2006 Rincon

Honda introduced the Rincon as their new top-of-the-line ATV using their largest ATV liquid-cooled four-stroke engine. The Rincon was the first ATV to feature an automotive-style automatic 3 speed transmission which shifts either automatically or can be switched to manual mode (called the Electronic Shift Program).

The vehicles also featured a number of other high end features, some for the first time on Honda ATV, including radial tires, a center hydraulic disc brake system mounted on the rear output shaft, and a fully independent rear suspension system. Also included was Traxlok, enabling riders to switch between 2WD and 4WD modes with a simple thumb-operated switch and a torque-sensing front differential that reduces torque steer for lighter steering effort in 4WD.

Available beginning in 2004 Honda added the GPScape model officially known as the TRX650GPS as an option which adds a built-in GPS unit contained within the instrument cluster assembly. The GPS featured storage for up to 100 waypoints, digital compass function indicating travel direction and an automatic compensating clock.

== Rincon Generation 2 (2006–Present) ==
Rincon

Overview
- Manufacturer: Honda
- Model years: 2005-Present

Powertrain
- Engine: 675cc liquid-cooled OHV semi-dry-sump longitudinally mounted single-cylinder four-stroke
- Transmission: Automatic with hydraulic torque converter, three forward gears, reverse and electronic controls

Dimensions
- Wheelbase: 50.8 inches (129 cm)
- Length: 83.2 inches (211 cm)
- Width: 46.8 inches (119 cm)
- Height: 47.5 inches (121 cm)
- Curb weight: 648 pounds (294 kg)

Chronology
- Predecessor: 2003 Rincon

The Rincon continues as Hondas top-of-the line ATV but starting in 2006 Honda gave the FourTrax Rincon an update in response to customer request. The Rincon 650 became known as the Rincon 680 when the engine size enlarged from 649cc to 675cc. Officially known as the TRX680FA and TRX680FGA. Along with the larger engine, Electronic Programmed Fuel Injection (PGM-FI) was introduced. New colors including NaturalGear Camouflage were added.

New features included a rollover sensor to kill the engine in the event the vehicle is partially or fully overturned, front disc brakes, fuel injection, increased power output, improved fuel mileage, elimination of the manual choke and much-easier cold starting, automatic compensation at different altitudes, automatic temperature compensation, a shorter engine warm-up period, and smoother idle. Later on a second spark plug was added to improve emissions.

Along with the petcock being removed and the addition of fuel injection, the fuel gauge was moved to the digital display. When the fuel level reaches the E symbol a low-fuel warning light begins to flash letting the rider know that they have about 1.1 gallons of fuel remaining, or enough for approximately 28 miles of reserve range. Battery capacity was increased from 14AH to 18AH.
