= Honda CR93 =

Racing motorcycle

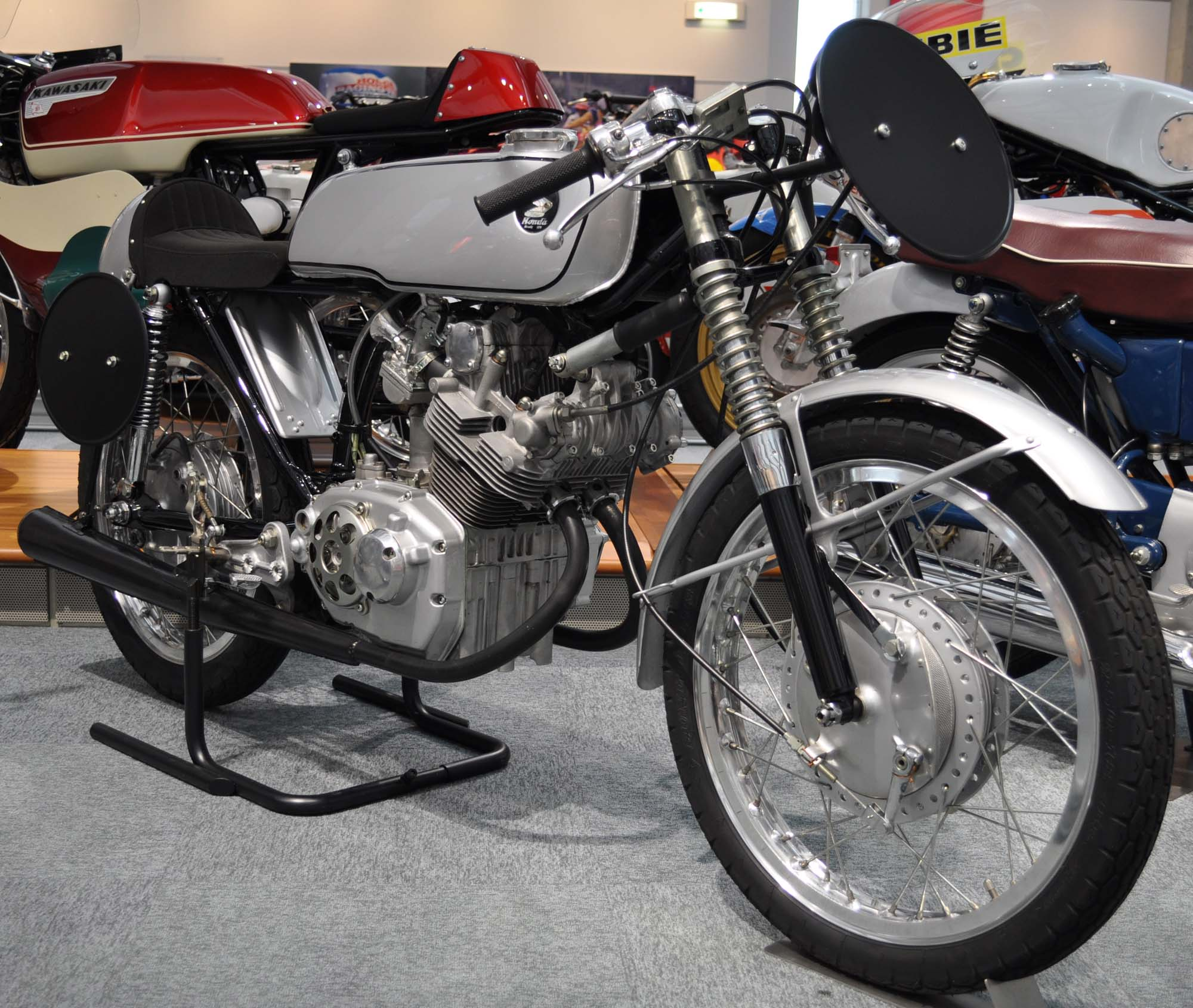
Honda CR93

The Honda CR93 was a twin cylinder 125 cc four stroke racing motorcycle, manufactured during 1962–1963 as a production-volume clubman's racer, and was used in racing for many years.

The engine used gear-driven double overhead camshafts with four valves and two long taper megaphone exhausts at a designated peak rpm of 12,000. It had a dry clutch and a five speed gearbox.

The CR93 was covered by Motorcycle Sport, then the companion monthly-magazine to Motor Sport, and published at the same premises. Ron Pladdys made a three-cylinder version from two engines, and manufactured sets of 182cc barrels and matching pistons to allow the CR93 to be used in 250 cc races.

MRW racing the CR93 at Brands Hatch

The Pladdys Three was the subject of a racer test in Motorcycle Sport. The 182 barrels and pistons were used in the 1974 Lightweight Manx GP in the Isle of Man. Illustrations of the engine from the manual were reported in Motorcycle Sport,

Honda made a limited number of fully legal road-going versions of the CR93. Honda UK held spares for the CR93, distributed sparingly by Alf Briggs until 1975, when they ran out.
