= Honda PA50 =

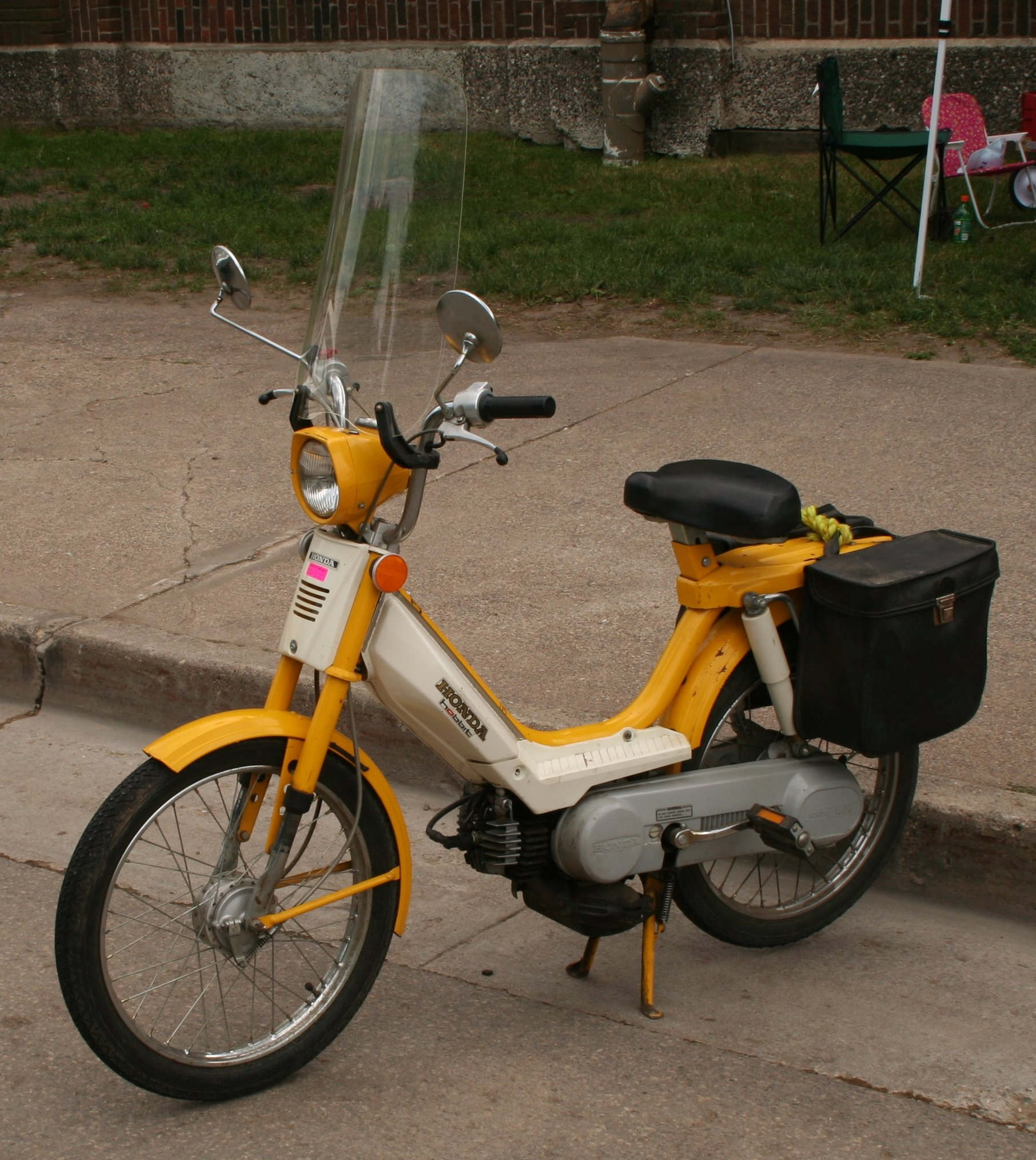
- Honda PA50 Hobbit
- Manufacturer: Honda Benelux (Honda Belgium)
- Also called: Hobbit (US); Camino (UK & Europe)
- Production: 1976-1991 (UK & Europe); 1978-1983 (US)
- Assembly: Aalst, Belgium
- Class: Moped
- Engine: 49 cc (3.0 cu in), air-cooled, two-stroke, single
- Bore / stroke: 39.6 mm (1.56 in)
- Compression ratio: 6.7:1
- Transmission: Automatic clutch single-speed CVT
- Frame type: Backbone
- Suspension: Front: Telescopic, travel 2.5/65 in/mm Rear: Pivoted-fork, travel 6/150 in/mm
- Brakes: Drum, front and rear
- Weight: 45 kg (99 lb) (dry)

The Honda PA50 is a moped produced by Honda Benelux between 1976 and 1991. It was marketed as the Honda Hobbit in the US and as the Honda Camino in the UK and Europe. The vehicle was manufactured at Honda's first factory outside Japan, located in Aalst, Belgium, until 1991. Though it has mostly disappeared from the streets of the US and the UK like most mopeds of similar type (e.g. Motobecane, Mobylette, and Puch Maxi), it remains very popular in Belgium, where it is often modified using high performance parts.

== Models ==
The following models of the Honda PA50 were produced between 1976 and 1991:

- Honda PA50 L Camino. 49 cc. UK July 1976 to February 1978
- Honda PA50 VL Camino. 49 cc. UK July 1976 to November 1978, September 1984 to 1986
- Honda PA50 DX VL Camino Deluxe. 49 cc. UK June 1978 to February 1984
- Honda PA50 DX VLS Camino Sport. 49 cc. UK April 1981 to June 1983
- Honda PA50 DX VLM Camino Deluxe Special. 49 cc. UK February 1982 to February 1984
- Honda PA50 VLC Camino. 49 cc. UK 1986
- Honda PA50 VCH Camino. 49 cc. UK September 1986 to June 1991
- Honda PA50 Hobbit I and II. 49 cc. US 1978 to 1983

Legend
L= Basic Model
M= 25 km/h
V= Variomatic (continuously variable transmission)
C= Chrome Fenders and Indicator Lights
S= Sport/Young Camino (with double saddle and cast alloy wheels)
DX= Deluxe (with double saddle)
H= 1987 model

== Model varieties ==
- PA50 L Camino – The first Camino model produced featuring a single-speed, automatic clutch with a conventional V-belt transmission. Features very basic electricals, with no battery or indicator lights.
- PA50 VL Camino – A modified version of the PA 50 L to include the Variomatic transmission.
- PA50 DX VL Camino – similar to the PA 50 VL model except for the basket fitted as standard equipment
- PA50 DX VLS Camino Sport – Based on the Deluxe model, this features a round headlamp with separate speedometer, cast alloy wheels, a larger seat and different rear carrier, unshrouded suspension units and brighter paintwork and graphics
- PA50 DX VLM Camino Deluxe Special – Based on the original Deluxe model, this has metallic paintwork, a round headlamp with separate speedometer and unshrouded rear suspension units.
- PA50 VLC Camino – Based on the VL model, but with a more comprehensive electrical system, including turn signals powered by a battery.
- PA50 VCH Camino – Identical to the VLC model apart from colour and graphics. Model can be identified by its grey seat and engine casings, and white headlamp casing, as opposed to the black items fitted to the VLC model.

== Main differences between the PA50I and PA50II (United States) ==
Honda made 2 models of the PA50; the PA50II, which could reach speeds of 30 mph (45 km/h), and the PA50I, which could only reach speeds of 20 mph (32 km/h). The easiest way to identify a PA50I model is by its red and white (1978) or all red and black (1979) paint job and sticker saying it is a PA50I/PA50M (this does not apply to all bikes though). The PA50I was sold in states where moped speeds could not exceed 20 mph(32 km/h). The Honda PA50I was discontinued in 1980, with the only model available being the PA50II; and because of this, some consider this bike somewhat rare, since they were only made in the United States for 2 years (1978–1979). The main way Honda accomplished the speed difference was not in the engine's displacement, but in the fuel supply and carburetor. The air intake holes leading into the filter are smaller, as well as the exhaust size. The carburetors are mostly the same, with the main difference being the main jet; The PA50II has a #78, and the PA50I has a #60 main jet. The engine reed is also different, with the PA50I having 1 slot, and the PA50II having 2 smaller slots, overall increasing the size. A common way that PA50I owners upgrade their mopeds to PA50II speeds is by making the 3 air holes before the filter bigger, upgrading the carburetor, and upgrading the reed to PA50II specs. There are some other minor differences though (like the slightly different frame mounts and cylinder connections and the exhausts being crimped on most PA50I's, as well as on some PA50II's).
