= Honda TLR200 =

Motorcycle

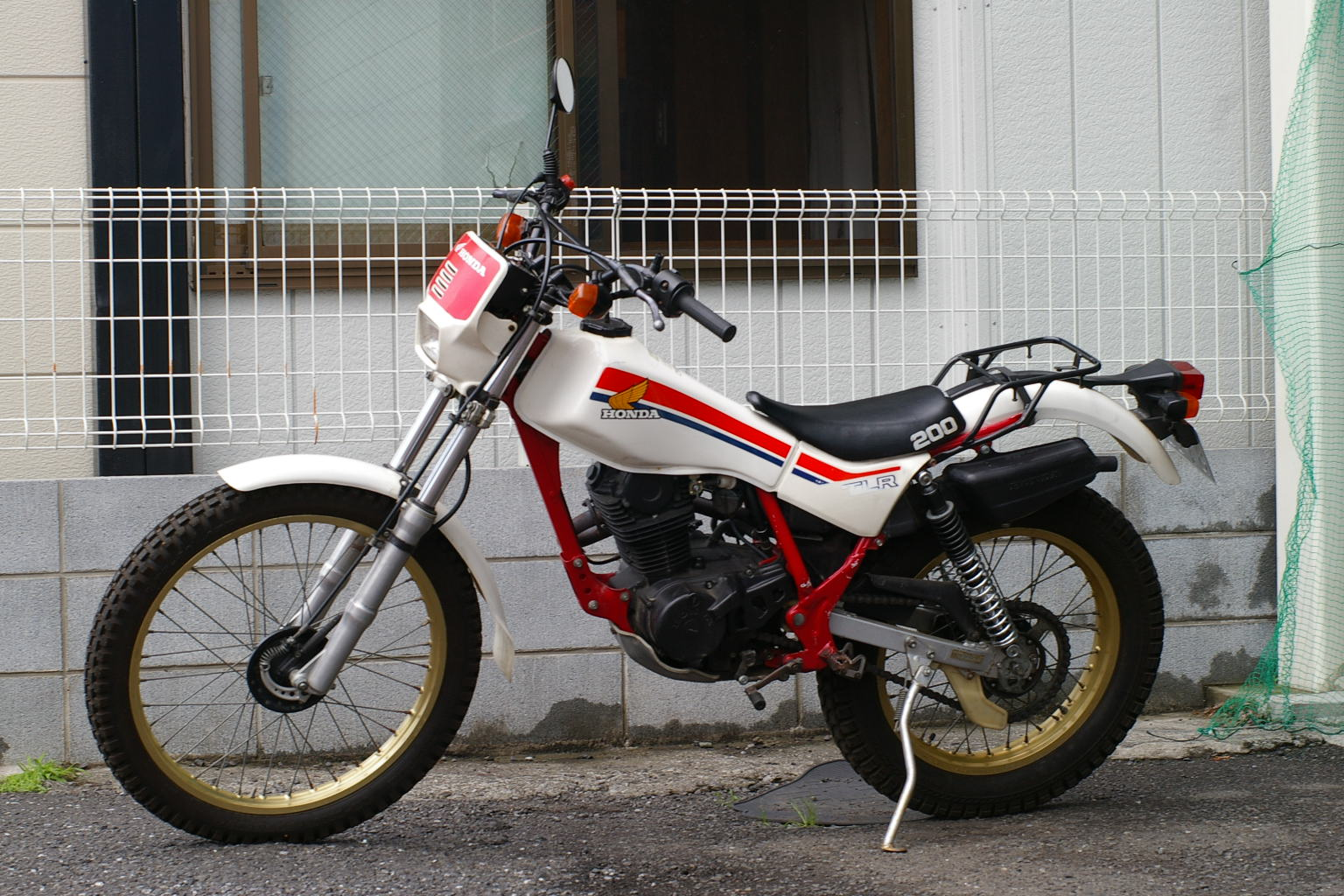
TLR200

The Honda Reflex (TLR200) is a dual purpose trials motorcycle sold through 1986 to 1987. Both year models are exactly the same. 1987 models were left over bikes from 1986, re-badged as 1987 models. In the 1983 Scottish Six Days Trial Kiyoteru Hattori riding the bike won the 151cc-200cc class. "the road to making Hondas challenge of winning the trial championship a reality". The top speed on the tlr200 is about 70 mph

The Honda Reflex used an XR200 engine in a different frame. This engine was also used in a three-wheeler made by Honda.

The Reflex also has the tight turning radii typical of trials motorcycles. Its steering column can almost turn completely perpendicular to the bike's frame. It is designed to be a stand up motorcycle, though it does have a seat and lights for road use. With light sprocket modifications it is a functional bike for motorcycle trials.

Honda produced other trials models:

- TL125
- TL250
- TL200E "Seeley"
- TLR125
- TLR250

== Specification ==
Dimensions

Overall Length: 2080mm
Seat height: 780mm
Dry weight: 90 kg Total weight: 100 kg

Engine

Type: Gasoline air cooled 4 stroke cycle
Bore x Stroke: 65.5 x 57.8mm
Compression Ratio: 8.2:1
Valve Train: Over head cam Chain driven
Maximum Horsepower: 13.4ps/6,500rpm
Displacement: 194cc

Drive Train

Clutch: Wet Multi Plate
Transmission 6 speed constant mesh

Frame

Type: Diamond Frame
Front suspension Travel:160mm
Rear suspension Travel:150mm
