= Honda FC50 =

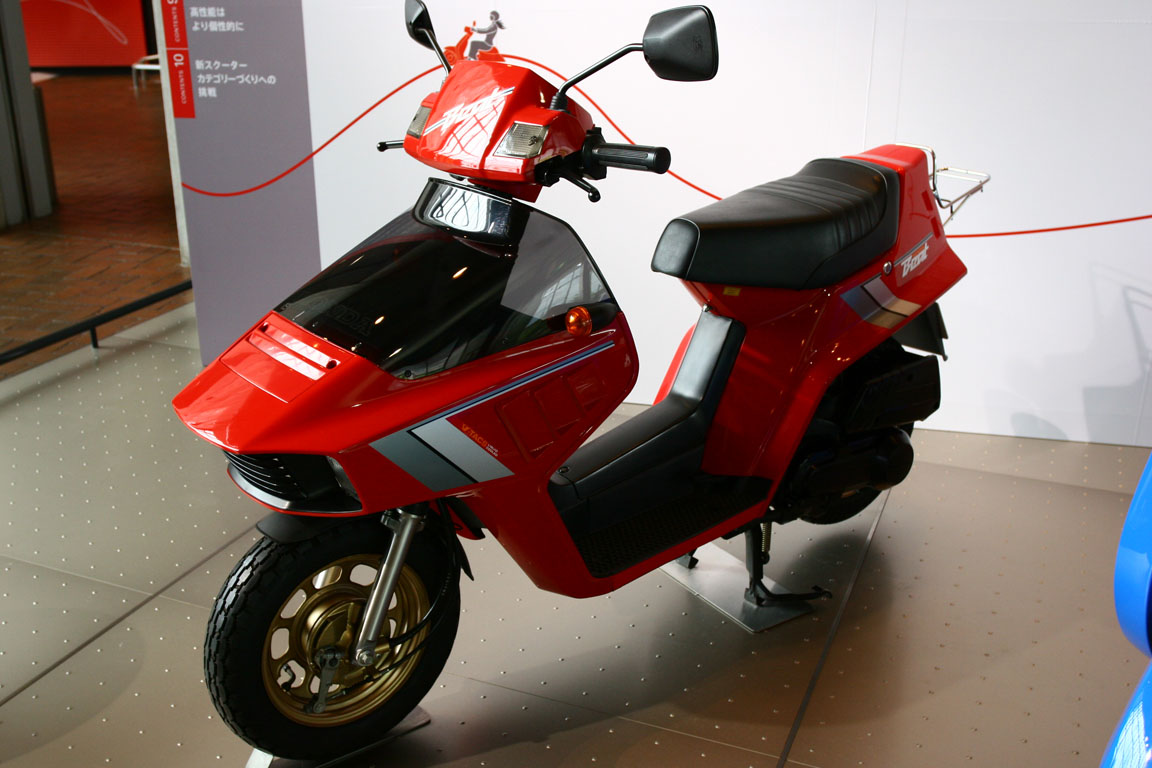
- 1983 Honda Beat
- Manufacturer: Honda
- Also called: Beat
- Production: 1983
- Class: Scooter
- Engine: 48 cc (2.9 cu in), liquid-cooled, two stroke, single, 7.2 PS (5.4 kW)
- Transmission: CVT belt
- Weight: 60 kg (130 lb) (dry); 65 kg (143 lb) (wet)

The Honda FC50, also known as the Honda Beat, is a 50 cc (3.1 cu in) scooter manufactured by Honda in 1983. It was produced mainly for the Japanese domestic market — although both new and used models were exported from Japan—making it a fairly hard-to-find scooter. It was available in red, black, or white.

The FC50 was powered by a liquid cooled, single cylinder, two-stroke petrol engine, one of the most powerful in its class. The small radiator was fitted behind the grille between the two headlights. It featured 12-volt electric start and CVT transmission; the transmission changed from low to high at around 5500 rpm. It had an automatic centrifugal clutch that engaged gradually from 3000 rpm.

It was made to carry only one person at a time and had no provisions for a passenger. It featured V-TACS; this was a small valve in the exhaust port that was closed to activate using a lever operated by rider's left heel. Many other larger two-stroke engines use a similar system although most are engaged automatically by electric servos. V-TACS gave it more power from 5500 rpm, but reduced power if engaged at lower engine speeds.

An expansion chamber and tuned length exhaust were fitted from factory although they were only "average" in design. Top speed was about 60 km/h (37 mph) at an engine speed of 11,000 rpm. Both front and back brakes were drum brakes.

The instrument panel had a tachometer (rpm), a speedometer, and gauges for engine temperature and fuel level. A small set of lights on the tachometer illuminated when V-TACS was engaged; other instrument lights lit up for turn signal, oil low (two-stroke oil), and high beam. A small light on the speed dial flashed when 35 km/h (22 mph) was exceeded.
