= Honda CR480 =

- Manufacturer: Honda
- Production: 1982–1983
- Class: Off road
- Engine: 472 cc (28.8 cu in) air-cooled, two-stroke, single
- Transmission: Four-speed (1982); five speed (1983) Manual transmission
- Brakes: F: Drum; R: Drum
- Weight: 226 lb (103 kg) (dry)

The Honda CR480R is a motocross racing motorcycle, made by Honda in 1982 and 1983.

The bike was a replacement for the earlier Honda CR450, made only in 1981. The '82 had a front drum brake and a four-speed gearbox.The '83 had internally adjustable front forks and a five-speed gearbox.

Danny "Magoo" Chandler rode a CR480 when he won the 1982 ABC Sports Superbikers race, where professional motorcycle racers from various racing disciplines competed on a combination dirt and paved track. and competed in the 1983 race. Racer Steve Wise also won a Superbikers race with a CR480. This race was a precursor to modern Supermoto racing.

The 1982 CR480 had about 52 horsepower and was quite light for its horsepower, at about 226 pounds. Magnesium parts were used for weight saving and the bike had a hand-riveted air-box/air filter housing.

The bike is popular with historic racers that participate in American Historical Motorcycle Racing Association events where competitive classes are run for the various vintage racing classic motorcycles.

== See also ==
- Honda CR series
