= Honda NQ50 =

Type of motor scooter

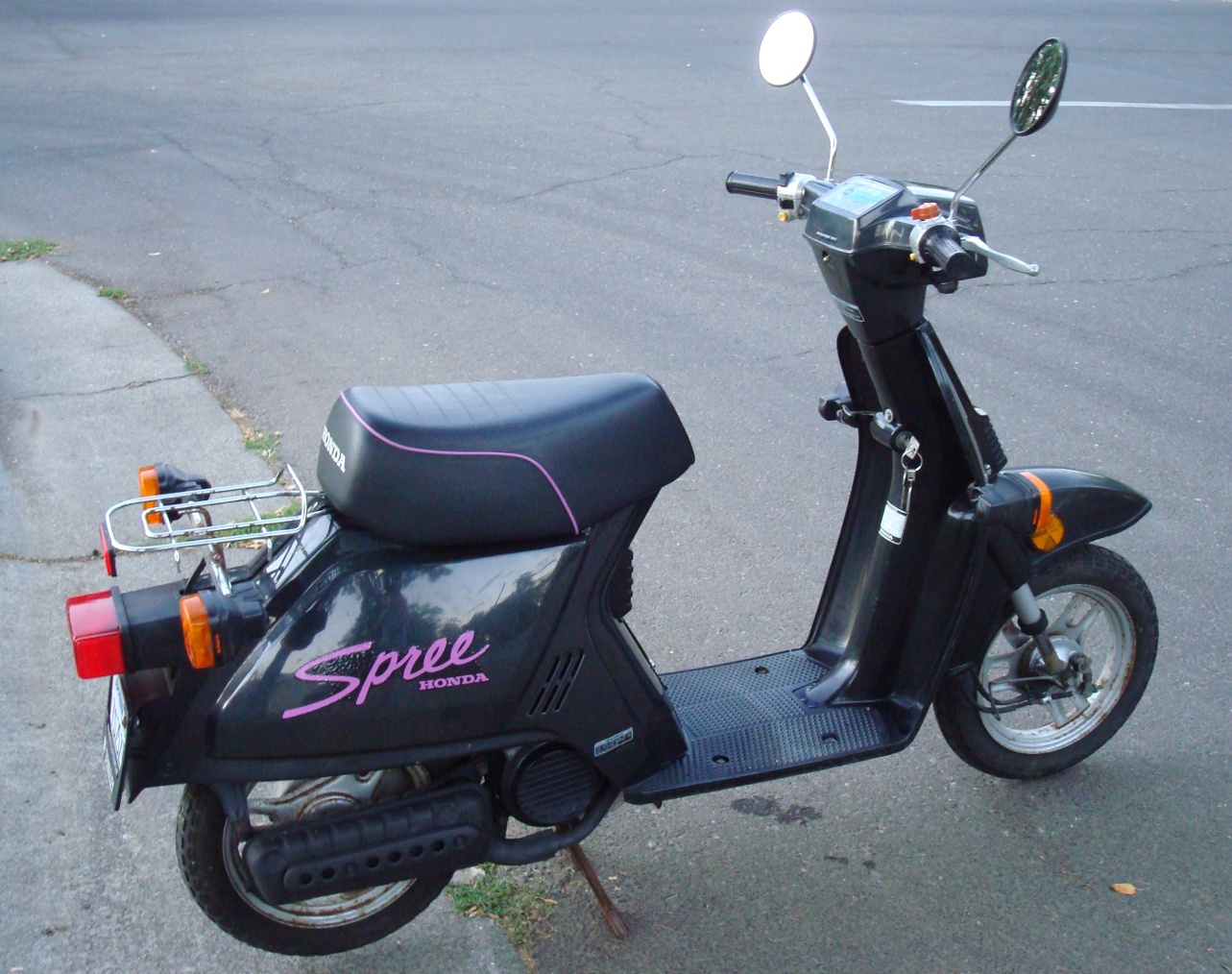
- 1986 Honda Spree (Honda NQ50)
- Manufacturer: Honda
- Also called: Spree; Eve; Nifty 50
- Production: 1980s
- Predecessor: Honda Eve Smile (Japan, 1983)
- Successor: Honda SB50 (Elite ES, 1988)
- Class: Motor scooter
- Engine: 49 cc (3.0 cu in), AF05 single‑cylinder, two‑stroke
- Top speed: ~60 km/h (varied by model/year)
- Transmission: Belt driven single-speed, kick start on later years
- Related: Honda Elite (SB50)

Honda NQ50 (marketed as the Honda Spree, Honda Eve, or Honda Nifty 50) was a 49 cc motor scooter produced by Honda in the mid‑1980s. The model featured a small displacement two‑stroke AF05 engine and was available in regional variants including the US Spree, Japanese Eve, and EU/Australian Nifty 50.

The Honda Eve or Honda Spree or Nifty 50 (NQ50) is a 49 cc (3.0 cu in) motor scooter made by Honda in the 1980s. Honda marketed two more models based on the Eve's design. All models utilized a single geared AF05 engine.

== Honda Eve Smile ==
The first variation of the NQ50 was the Honda Eve Smile, and was exclusive to Japan. One of the rarest Honda scooter ever made.

- 1983: The Eve was available in red for its first year of production.

The bike was missing some vital features, including battery, starter motor, and automatic bystarter. This model also lacked a removable main jet, so tuning was limited without replacing the carburetor with a later model revision. Due to the lack of automatic starter, the Eve required a kick start. Eve's standard speed can reach up to 60 kph and its fuel consumption is 1 liter per 83 km. Changing to a bigger tuned carburetor increased its speed and throttle response. Upgrading its ignition spark system can increase its fuel economy.

- 1984-1987: The Eve Pax also gained a battery and starter motor, but retained the manual bystarter control mounted underneath the horn switch. A form of hybrid carburetor containing features from both the Spree/Nifty and the previous Eve, including a removable main jet and a slightly bigger intake.

Like the Nifty 50, the Eve lacked a dedicated engine stop switch, so the only way to stop the engine was to turn the key off. The 1984-1987 Eves were available in white, blue, or red.

== Honda Spree ==
=== Model differences by year ===
- 1984: The Spree was available in sparkling red (US only), cortina white, or vista blue (Canada only). The speedometer design was slightly different from that used in the 1985-1987 Sprees, with speed numbers 10-20-30-40 instead of 5-15-25-35. The logo was also much smaller than later years.
- 1985: The Spree logo was much larger than the 1984 Sprees, making it more visible.
- 1986: The Spree got a kick starter. Honda also produced a "Special Edition" Spree, in Shasta white and lollipop green combo. This Spree is now extremely rare.
- 1987: The dashboard, front indicators and tail lamps were redesigned for a more aerodynamic shape. Also, a glove box was added behind the shield or front of the scooter, underneath the handlebars and in front of the floorboard.

=== Iowa Edition ===
The Iowa Edition Spree was a restricted version that utilized a restricted muffler, smaller main jet and a 12:83 (6.917) gear ratio in order to comply with Iowa laws on the use of mopeds. It was limited in top speed to 25 mph. The 1987 Iowa Edition Spree is a very rare model.

== Honda Nifty 50 ==
=== AU ===
- 1984-1987: The Nifty was available in red or dark blue; the latter seems most common. The main visible difference from the Spree is the round headlight and the curved edges of the dashboard.

=== EU ===
- 1984: The Nifty was available in red or dark blue; The main visible difference from the Spree is the round headlight and the curved edges of the dashboard. The front headlights are mounted upside down on the underside of the handlebars. The luggage rack is simpler than the Spree's, and the rear lights are mounted either side of the number plate mount rather than on the luggage rack tubing.
- 1985: The EU Nifty was identical to the 1984 and '85, with the exceptions of different labels and stickers, and a square red start button rather than a round yellow.

Neither of the Niftys included an engine stop switch above the engine start switch, so the only proper way of stopping the engine was to turn off the ignition.
