= Honda CR85R =

Racing motorcycle

The Honda CR85R is a racing motorcycle by Honda with a two-stroke engine. It was discontinued in 2007 and replaced with the CRF150R four-stroke bike.

The CR85R Expert variant has larger wheels and a longer swingarm. It therefore has a higher ground clearance and seat height. The CR85R Expert cannot race in the regular 85 cc (5.2 cu in) class in the AMA.
