= Honda SH150i =

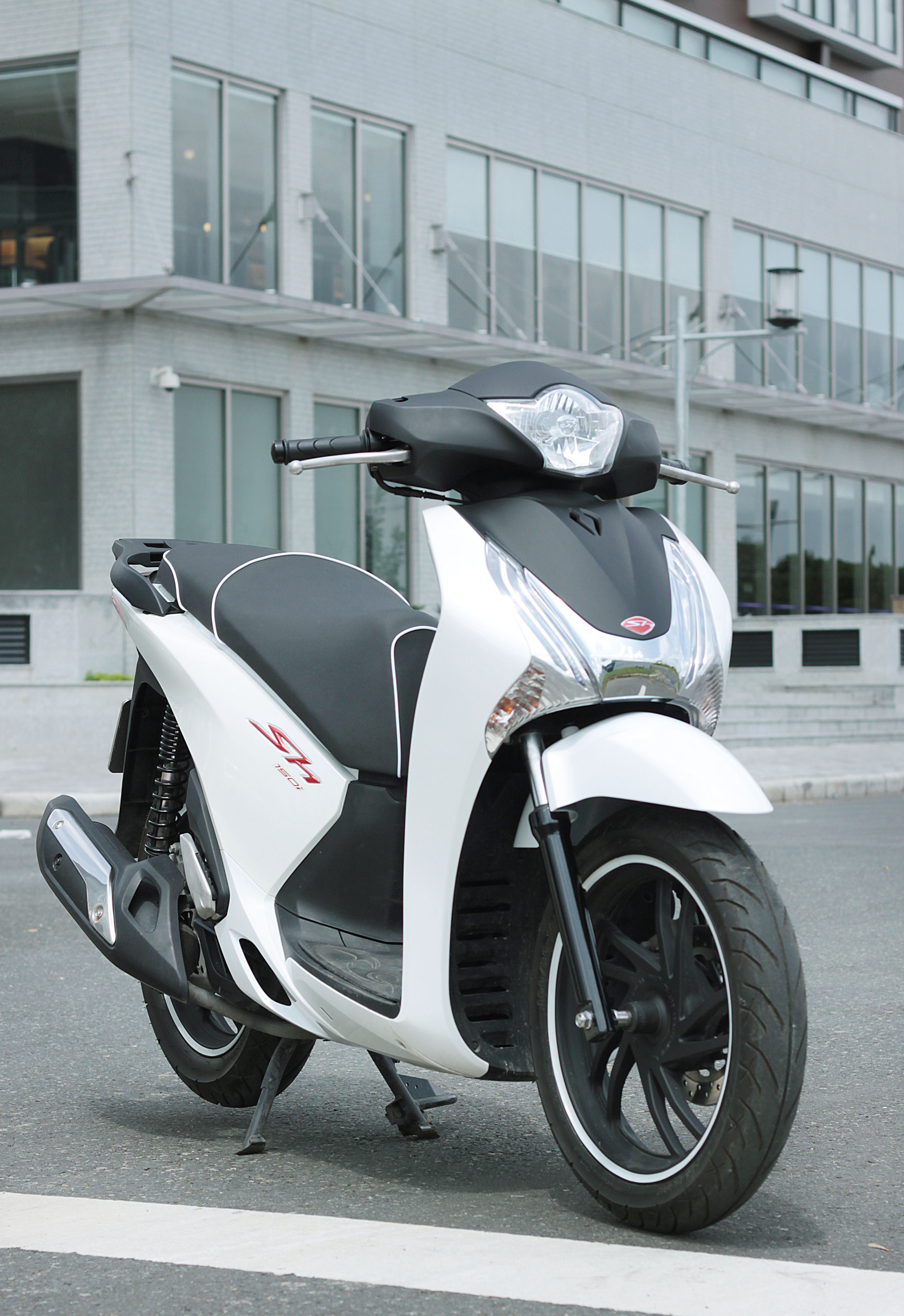
- 2013 Honda SH150i
- Manufacturer: Honda
- Engine: 152.7 cc (9.32 cu in), liquid-cooled, 4-stroke, SOHC, single
- Bore / stroke: 58 mm × 57.8 mm (2.28 in × 2.28 in)
- Compression ratio: 11.0:1
- Ignition type: Electric start
- Transmission: Honda V-Matic belt-converter automatic
- Suspension: Front: telescopic Rear: swingarm
- Brakes: Front: disc Rear: drum
- Tires: Front: 100/80-16; Rear: 120/80-16
- Wheelbase: 53.4 in (1,360 mm)
- Dimensions: L: 2,020 mm (80 in); W: 700 mm (28 in); H: 1,140 mm (45 in)
- Seat height: 790 mm (31 in)
- Fuel capacity: 7.5 L (1.6 imp gal; 2.0 US gal)
- Related: Honda SH350i

The Honda SH150i is a motor scooter, developed by Honda and presented during 2005. The SH150i is the best selling scooter in Italy.
