= Honda WN7 =

Full-size electric motorcycle by Honda introduced in 2025

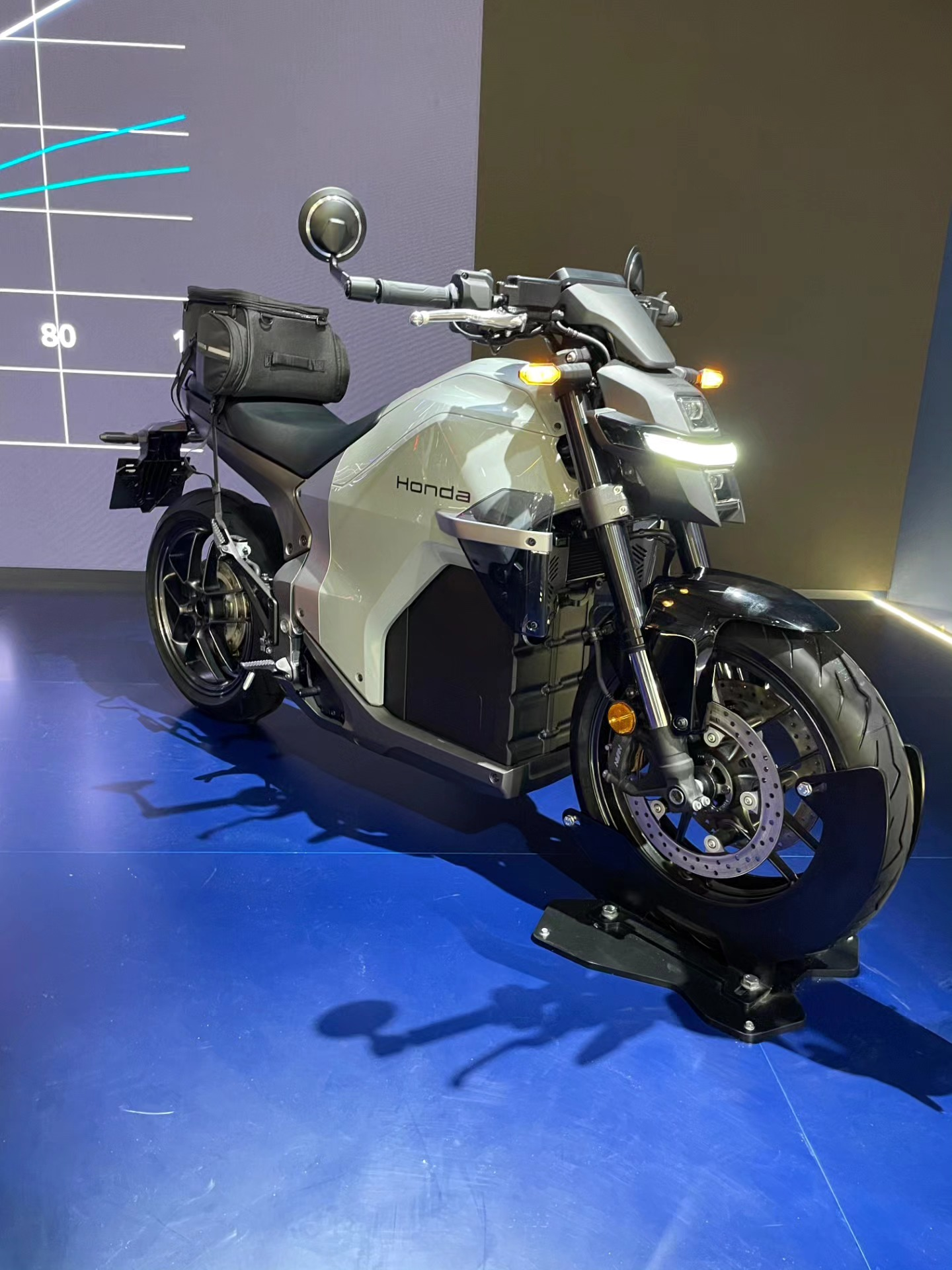
- Honda WN7 electric motorcycle shown at EICMA 2025
- Manufacturer: Honda
- Production: 2025-present (expected)
- Assembly: Japan: Kikuchi, Kumamoto
- Class: Electric standard / naked
- Engine: Electric motor, liquid-cooled
- Power: Up to 50 kW (claimed)
- Torque: Up to 100 N·m (claimed)
- Transmission: Belt final drive (reported)
- Weight: 217 kg (kerb, reported) (dry)
- Range: Over 130 km (≈80 mi)
- Related: Honda WN series

The Honda WN7 is a full-sized electric motorcycle manufactured by Honda. It was introduced at the EICMA motorcycle show in Milan in November 2025 and is the first model of the company’s new WN series of electric motorcycles.

== Overview ==
The WN7 represents Honda’s first fixed-battery electric platform aimed at the European market. Honda describes the design as a “naked streetfighter” style machine that combines everyday practicality with the performance of a mid-capacity internal-combustion motorcycle. The model name stands for *Be the Wind (Naked)* with “7” denoting its performance class.

== Design and features ==
The WN7 uses a slim, compact frame with a fixed lithium-ion battery pack integrated into the chassis. Honda cites a capacity of around 15.5 kWh, giving an estimated range of more than 130 km (≈ 80 mi). DC fast charging via the CCS2 standard allows charging from 20% to 80% in roughly 30 minutes, while AC home charging can deliver a full charge in about three hours.

The motorcycle features a 5-inch colour TFT display with Honda RoadSync connectivity, allowing navigation, music, and call integration. Three riding modes: Eco, Standard, and Sport. In addition, there is regenerative braking that simulates engine braking on deceleration.

== Performance ==
Honda claims peak output equivalent to a 600 cc petrol motorcycle, with maximum torque of 100 N·m and strong mid-range acceleration. An 11 kW variant is expected for riders with the European A1 licence. Kerb weight is listed at 217 kg. Honda reports that the chassis was tuned for urban agility as well as stability on winding roads.

== Launch ==
The WN7 was unveiled at EICMA 2025 as part of Honda’s long-term plan for a carbon-neutral motorcycle range by the 2040s. Production began late 2025, with European deliveries commencing in early 2026.

== See also ==
- Honda WN series
- Honda EM1 e:
- List of Honda motorcycles

== External link ==
- Honda WN7 – A Standout Model Blending Honda’s Uniqueness with the Appeal of Electric Motorcycles
