= Honda WN series =

Series of electric motorcycles by Honda

The Honda WN series is a family of electric motorcycles developed by Honda for road use, initially targeted at the European market. The series was introduced at the EICMA motorcycle show in Milan in November 2025, with the debut of the first production model, the Honda WN7. Honda describes the WN series as its first fixed-battery, full-sized electric motorcycle platform, positioned as everyday “naked”/standard machines with rapid DC charging and smartphone connectivity via Honda RoadSync.

== Overview ==
The WN series marks Honda's shift toward performance-oriented electric motorcycles within its broader carbon-neutral roadmap. Honda states the platform uses a fixed lithium-ion battery and a newly developed, liquid-cooled electric motor with an integrated inverter. The system supports DC fast charging using the CCS2 standard (claimed 20-80% in around 30 minutes) and includes a 5-inch TFT display with Honda RoadSync for navigation and communications.

== Models ==
WN7 (2026)

The inaugural model in the series, the WN7, is a naked/standard electric motorcycle. Honda claims a maximum motor output of up to 50 kW and up to 100 N⋅m of torque, with variants to suit different European licence categories (including A1). WMTC range is quoted up to approximately 140 km, and DC fast charging (CCS2) from 20 to 80% is claimed at around 30 minutes. Media reports note a battery capacity around 9-9.3 kWh and a quoted range of roughly 87–95 miles, depending on test cycle and market literature.

== Development and launch ==
Honda previewed the model family ahead of EICMA 2025 and positioned the WN7 as its first “full-size” electric motorcycle for Europe, with production slated to begin in late 2025 and deliveries planned for 2026. The company emphasised everyday usability, quick charging, and smartphone integration as key development goals.

== Technology ==
WN-series models use a fixed lithium-ion battery and a water-cooled traction motor with an integrated inverter. Charging is via Type 2 AC at home and CCS2 for DC fast charging; Honda quotes approximately 20-80% in about 30 minutes on DC. A 5-inch colour TFT with Honda RoadSync provides navigation and phone integration, and multiple ride modes and regenerative braking are included.

== See also ==
- Honda WN7
- Honda EM1 e:
- List of Honda motorcycles
