= EM1 =

The term EM1 may refer to:

== Science and technology ==
- Former name of Artemis 1, Exploration Mission-1, a mission for NASA's Orion spacecraft
- Olympus OM-D E-M1, a compact mirrorless interchangeable lens camera
- Korg Electribe EM-1, a digital synthesizer
- EM-1 Microbial Inoculant, first product in the line of effective microorganism supplements
- EM1, a designation for a vacuum tube, of Magic Eye type
- EM-1, The intermediate language used in the Amsterdam Compiler Kit

== Transport ==
- British Rail Class 76, or Class EM1, an electric locomotive
- EM-1, a class of Baltimore and Ohio Railroad locomotives
- Elias EM-1, a 1920s prototype US military biplane
- EM1, chassis code for a 1995–2000 Honda Civic coupe
- EM1, a type of Honda E engine used for the Honda Civic during 1980–83
- Honda EM1 e:, an electric scooter introduced in 2023

== Other ==
- EM-1, an experimental British assault rifle, precursor of the EM-2 rifle
- EM1, or Electrician's Mate 1st Class, an enlisted rate in the US Navy and US Coast Guard
- EM1, a category for streaming pupils formerly used in education in Singapore
