= Honda Mobile Power Pack =

The Honda Mobile Power Pack (MPP) is an exchangeable lithium-ion battery manufactured by Honda and Panasonic, intended to store power for personal mobility vehicles, including electric motorcycles and scooters. It was introduced at the 2017 Tokyo Auto Show to power the Honda PCX Electric and has since been adopted by the Swappable Battery Motorcycle Consortium formed by many motorcycle and scooter manufacturers, including Honda, Kawasaki, Suzuki, and Yamaha.

== History ==
Prior electric scooters previously marketed by Honda, including the CUV-ES (1994) and EV-neo (2009) used a high-voltage traction battery integral to the vehicle; in contrast, the 2018 PCX Electric was based on the conventional PCX scooter, equipped with an electric traction motor and removable storage battery which was intended to enable more rapid recharging to support realistic uses through battery swapping. The cells are manufactured by Panasonic.

Honda, Kawasaki, Suzuki, and Yamaha established the Swappable Battery Consortium for Electric Motorcycles in April 2019 and finalized their specification for a swappable battery in 2021; KTM and Piaggio also joined the consortium in March 2021.

== Specifications ==
The MPP operates at a voltage of 50.4 V with a minimum capacity of 20.8 A-h (1,052 W-h) as introduced in 2017. It has an overall volume of 7.1 L (0.25 ft^{3}) and weighs a maximum of 10.9 kg (24 lb), with dimensions (H×W×D) of 296 mm × 178 mm × 155 mm (11.7 in × 7.0 in × 6.1 in). It is an air-cooled design with a maximum discharge rate of 50 A or 2.5 kW (3.4 hp); at an ambient temperature of 40 °C (104 °F), the battery temperature rise is limited to 53 °C (127 °F) after 10 minutes at 2.5 kW, below the upper limit of 60 °C (140 °F).

In 2021, an updated Mobile Power Pack e: (DM5026Z) was released with an increased maximum storage capacity of 26.1 A-h (1,314 W-h at 50.26 V). When the Honda EM1 e: was released in 2023, capacity had increased again to 29.4 A-h (1,475 W-h).

== Applications ==
Honda envision that battery swapping stations built around charging banks of MPPs can be used to store energy when production from renewable sources is high and electric demand is low. Initial trials of battery swapping stations were held in Indonesia and the Philippines. For the trials in Indonesia, Honda, Panasonic, and Pacific Consultants, Ltd. established a joint venture. Trials were expanded in 2021, using MPPs to power local three-wheeled auto rickshaws in India. In 2022, the first battery swapping station in Tokyo began operation.

=== Vehicles using MPP ===
- Honda PCX Electric (2018)
- Honda Benly e: (2019)
- Honda Gyro e: (2021) & Gyro Canopy e: (2021)
- Honda EM1 e: (2023)
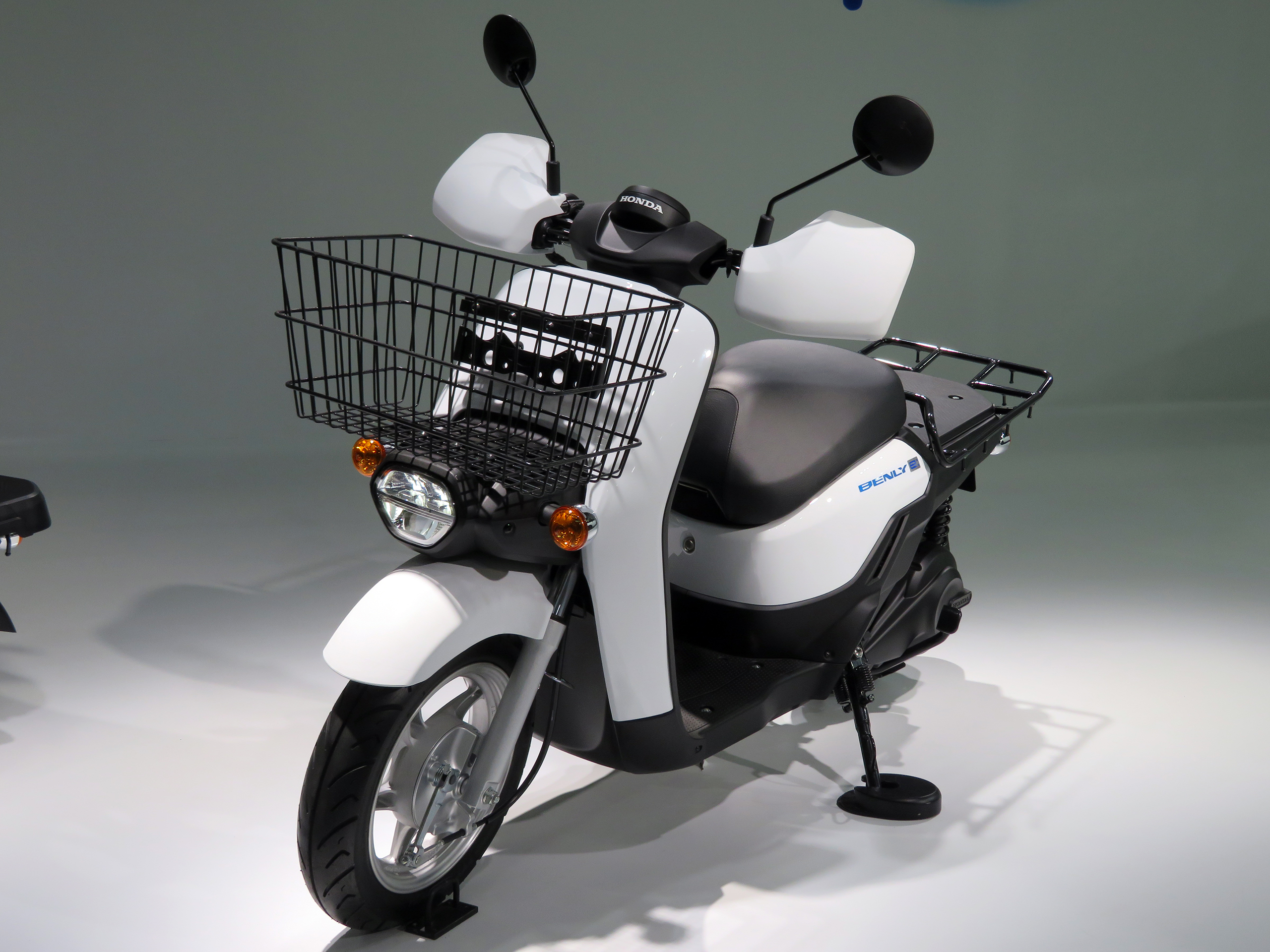
Honda Benly e:

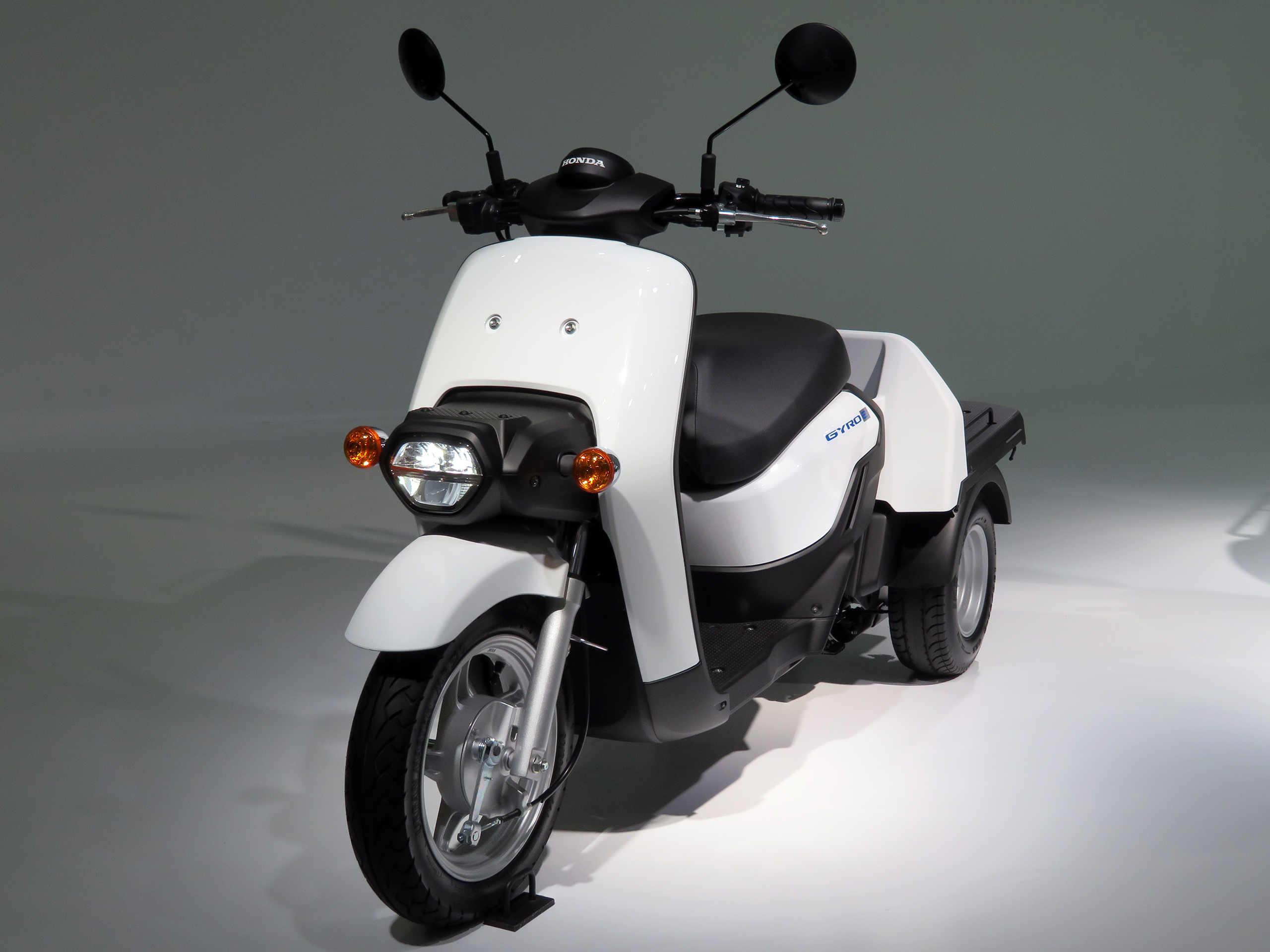
Honda Gyro e:
