= Honda PCX =

Scooter model manufactured by Honda

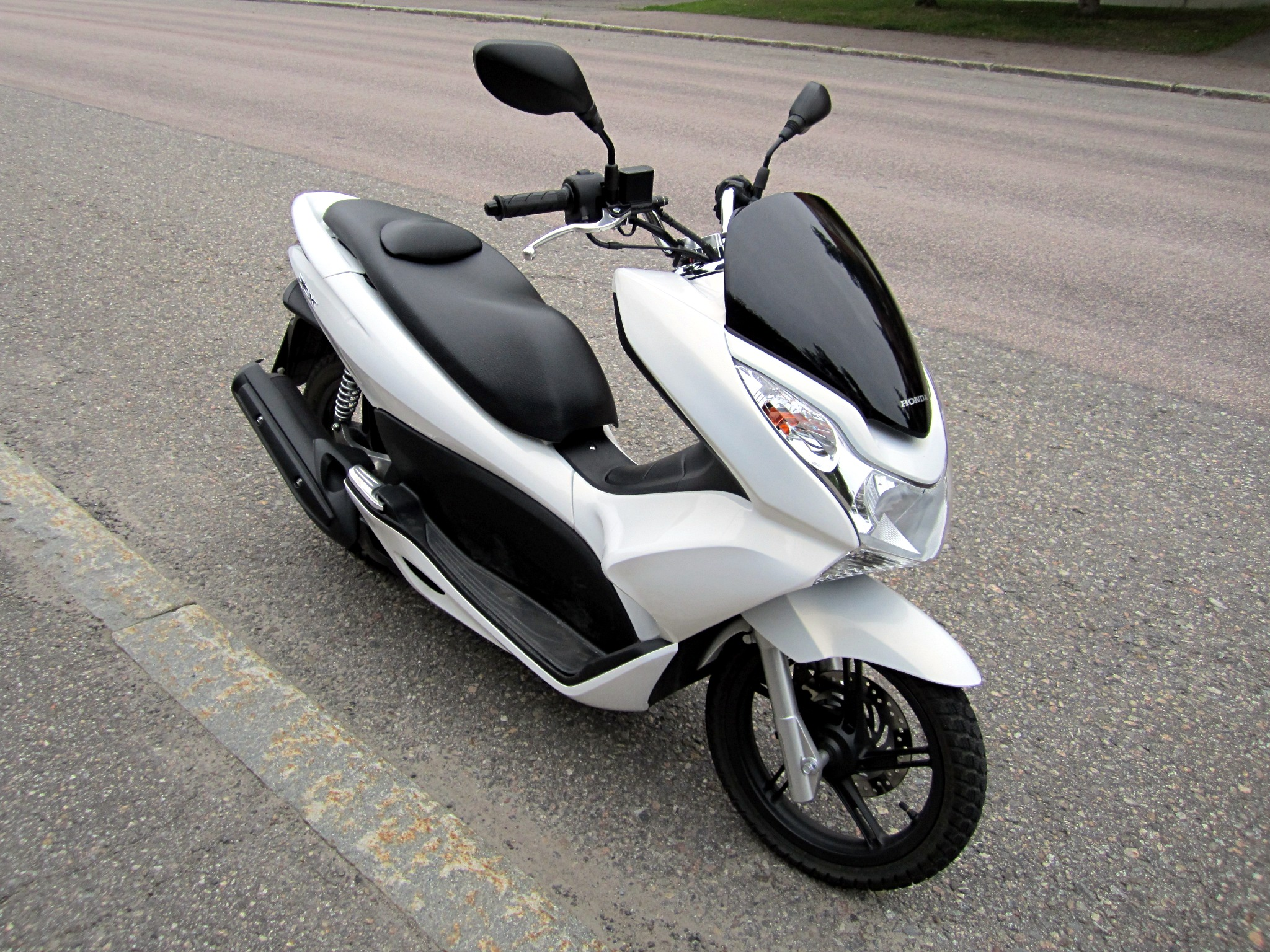
- 2011 Honda PCX125
- Manufacturer: Honda
- Production: 2009–present
- Assembly: Thailand (2009-2013); Atessa, Italy (2012-present); Vietnam (2014-present); Indonesia (2017-present); Manaus, Brazil (2013-present); Izmir, Türkiye (2026-present)
- Predecessor: Honda PCX 150
- Successor: Honda PCX 160
- Class: Scooter
- Engine: Liquid-cooled, four-stroke, SOHC two valve, single
- Bore / stroke: 52.4 mm × 57.9 mm (2.06 in × 2.28 in) (125cc); 58 mm × 57.9 mm (2.28 in × 2.28 in) (150cc)
- Top speed: 118 km/h (73 mph) (2018 model)
- Power: (PCX125) 8.6 kW (11.7 hp) @ 8,500 rpm; (PCX150) 10 kW (13.5 hp) @ 8,500 rpm
- Transmission: Honda V-Matic belt-converter automatic transmission
- Suspension: Dual Shock Absorber
- Brakes: Front: Single 220 mm disc with a three-piston caliper & CBS; Rear: drum with CBS (international); single disc with single-piston caliper (Indonesia, 2018 model)
- Tires: Front: 90/90-14; Rear: 100/90-14
- Wheelbase: (PCX125) 1,305 mm (51.4 in) (PCX150) 1,315 mm (51.8 in)
- Dimensions: L: 1,915 mm (75.4 in); W: 740 mm (29 in); H: 1,090 mm (43 in)
- Weight: (PCX125) 126 kg (278 lb) (dry)
- Fuel capacity: 8 L (1.8 imp gal; 2.1 US gal)
- Fuel consumption: (PCX125) 2.5 L / 100 km (mixed city, highway, expressway)
- Related: Honda Vario 125/Click 125i Honda Vario 150/Click 150i Honda SH125i/SH150i

The Honda PCX is a scooter made by the Japanese manufacturer Honda, it was first introduced for sale in November 2009. Production began in September 2009 at A.P. Honda Co., Ltd. in Bangkok, Thailand.

== 2010-2012 (JF28/KF12) ==
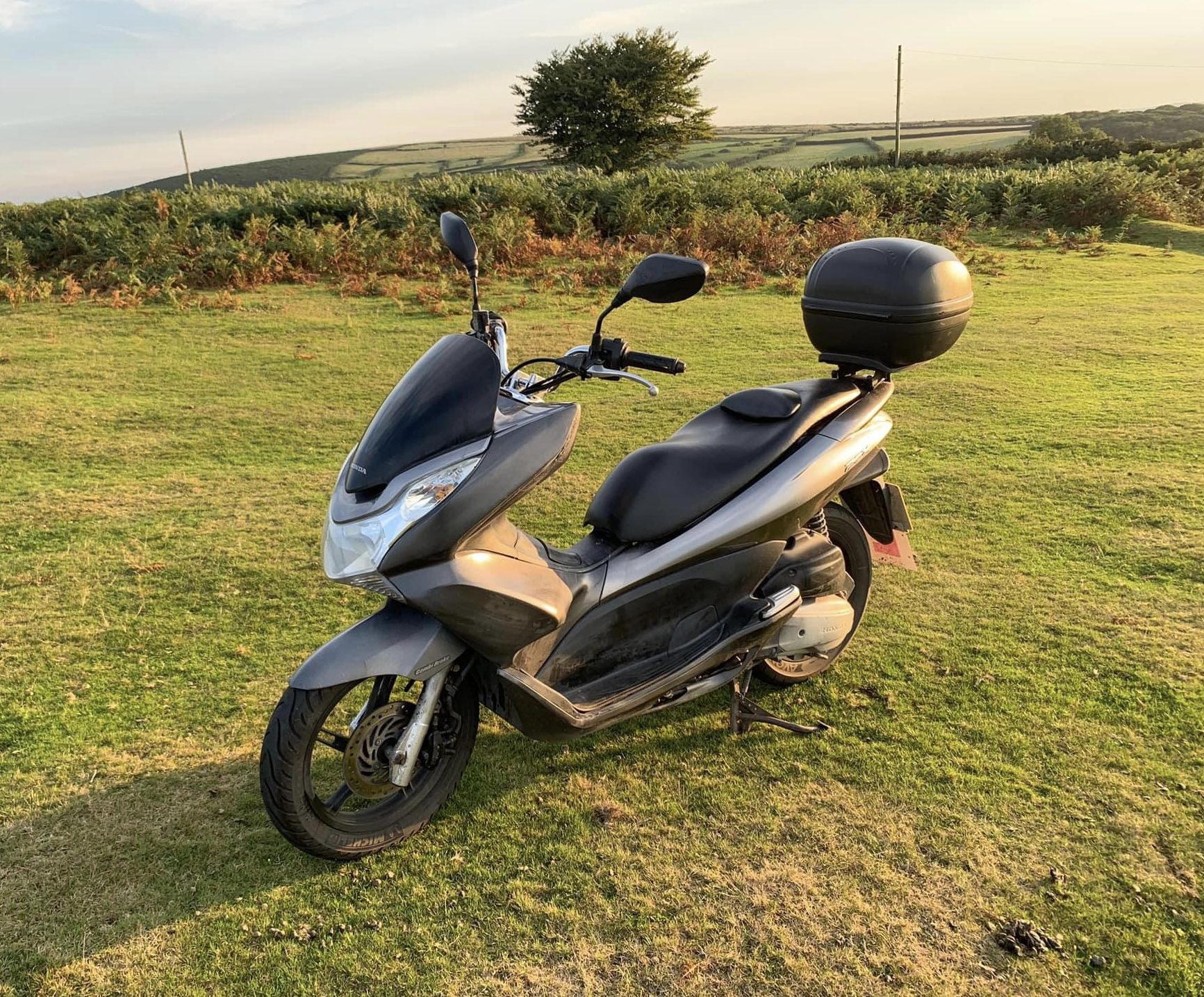
2010 Honda PCX125

In early 2010, the Honda PCX 125 was launched in the UK and US, while the PCX 150 was launched in the rest of Europe and Japan.

== 2012 eSP Update (JF47/KF15) ==
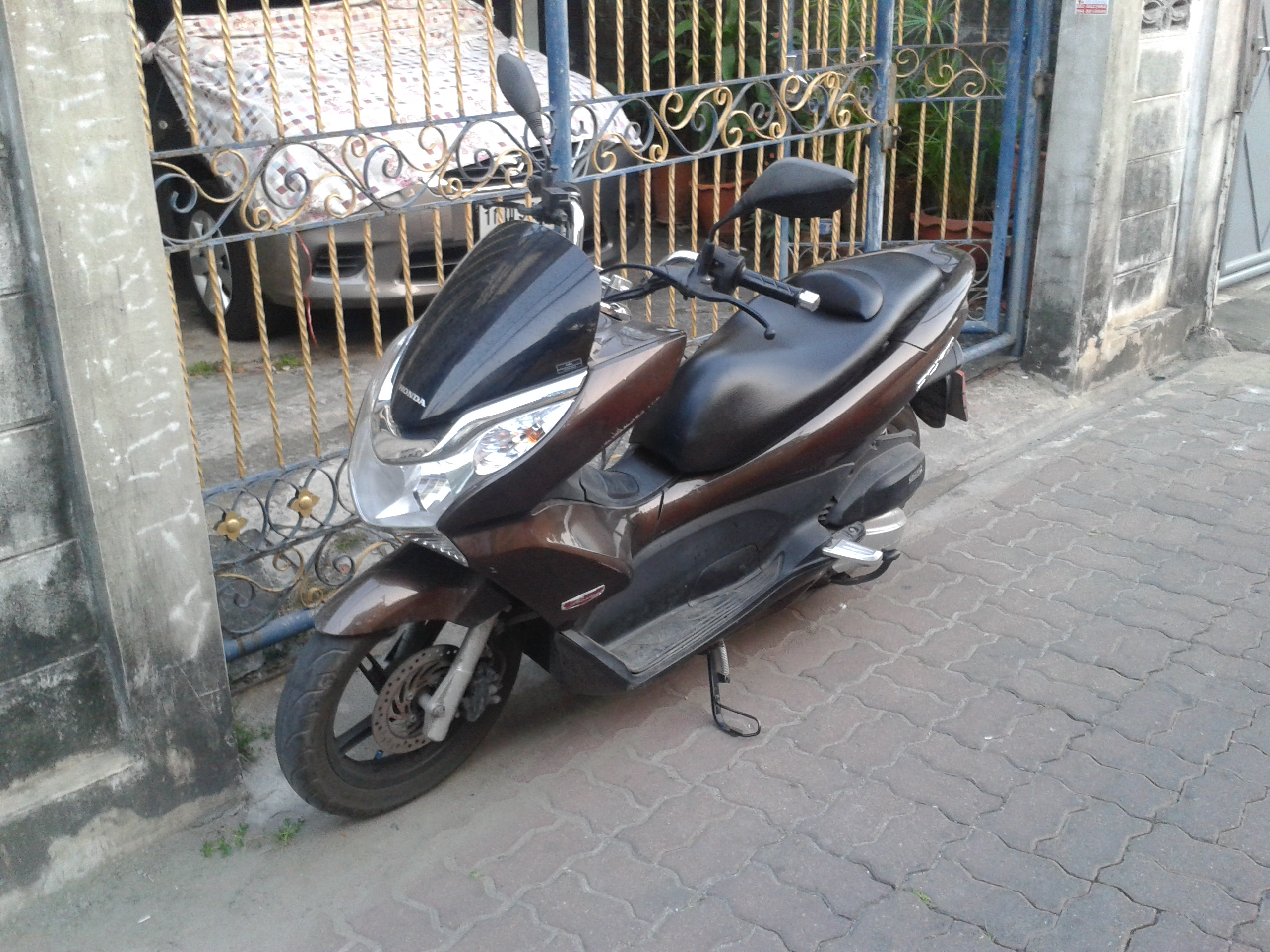
2012 Honda PCX 150

For 2012, the PCX 150 was launched in Australia. The US skipped the 2012 PCX 125 as they made a switch for the PCX 150 model which arrived in the summer of 2012, these were later sold in 2013 for both Canadian and US markets. This model became known as the PCX 125/150 eSP as the label was displayed on the airbox.

The 2012 update featured a redesigned engine to decrease friction; increasing efficiency, and the displacement (which was increased to 152.9 cc (9.33 cu in)). The new engine is based on Honda's eSP (Enhanced Smart Power) design. Honda continues to produce the 125 cc (7.6 cu in) version (with eSP) for export to select markets, such as Europe, where local licence requirements favour this engine displacement.

== 2014-2018 (JF57/JF64/KF19) ==
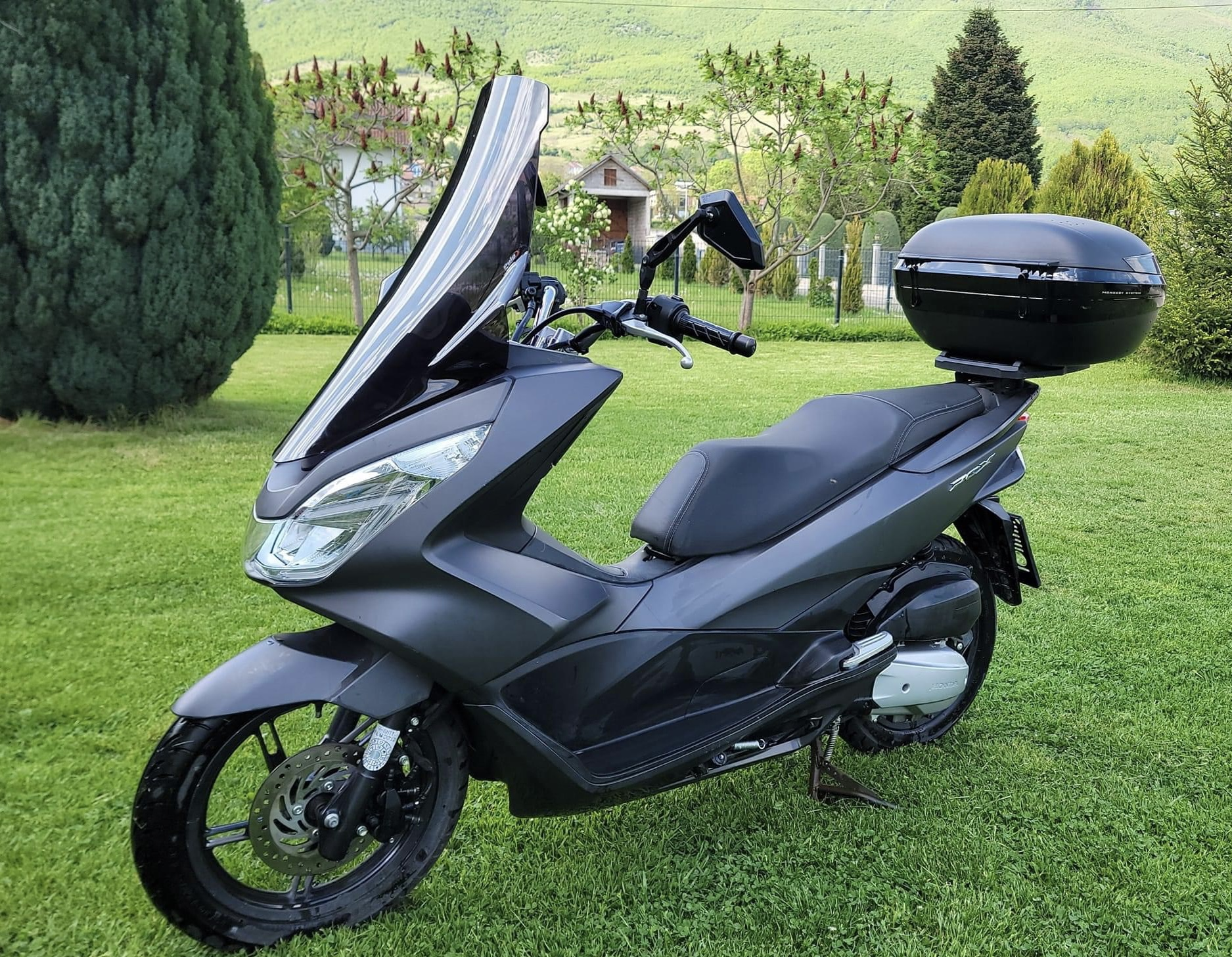
2014 Honda PCX 125

Also known as PCX 125/150 LED. This generation of PCX received a major facelift in 2014. Including new LED headlights, redesigned body, and a few other tweaks.

== 2018-2020 (JF81/JF83) ==
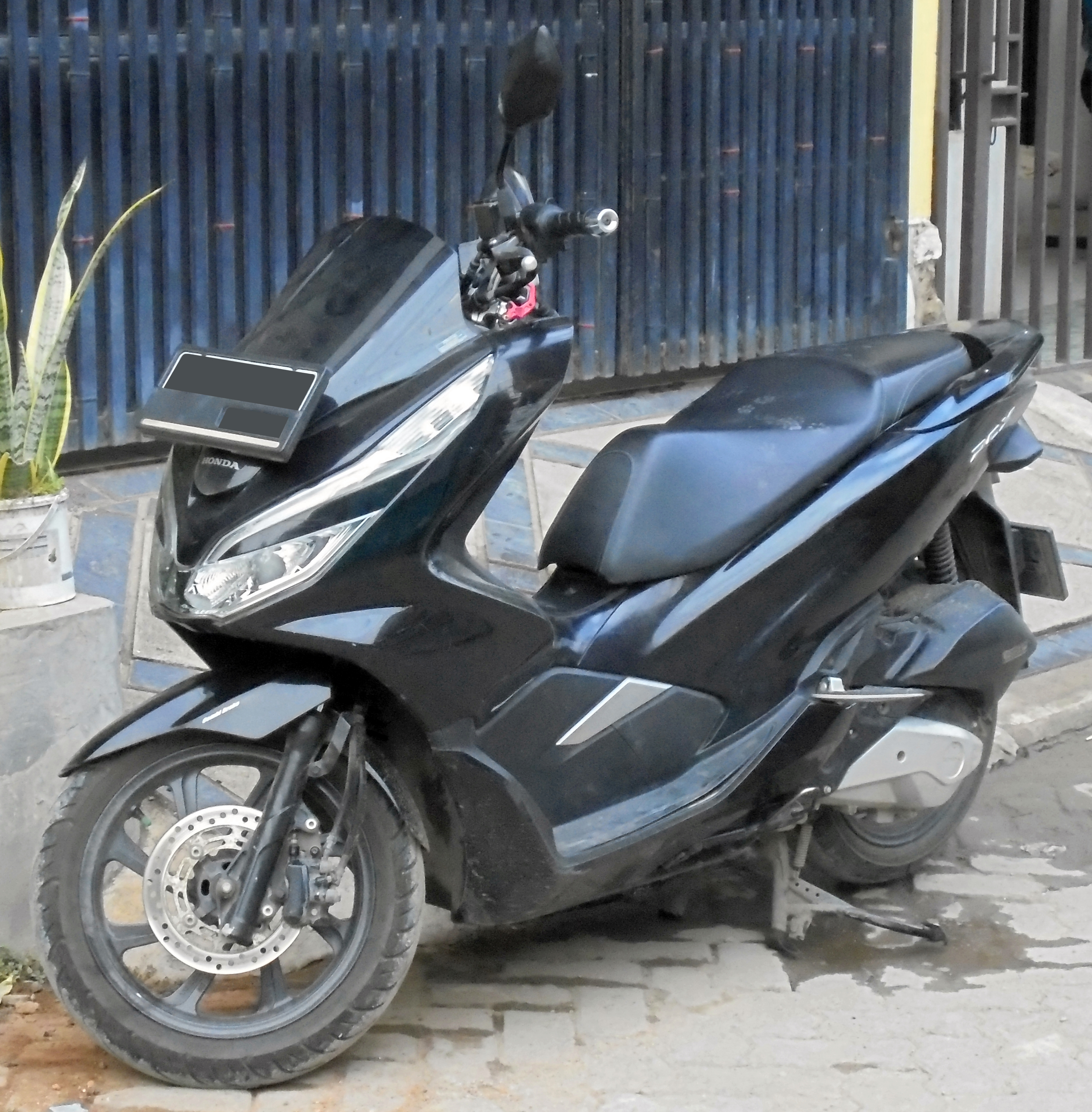
2019 Honda PCX 150 without ABS

Also known as PCX 125 Digital, Honda unveiled two new versions of the PCX at the 2017 Tokyo Motor Show, a hybrid and an electric version. The new version of Honda PCX is expected to launch to the public in 2018. This new generation PCX featured a new tubular steel frame, ABS (Anti-Locking Braking System)

=== 2018- present Hybrid (JF84) ===
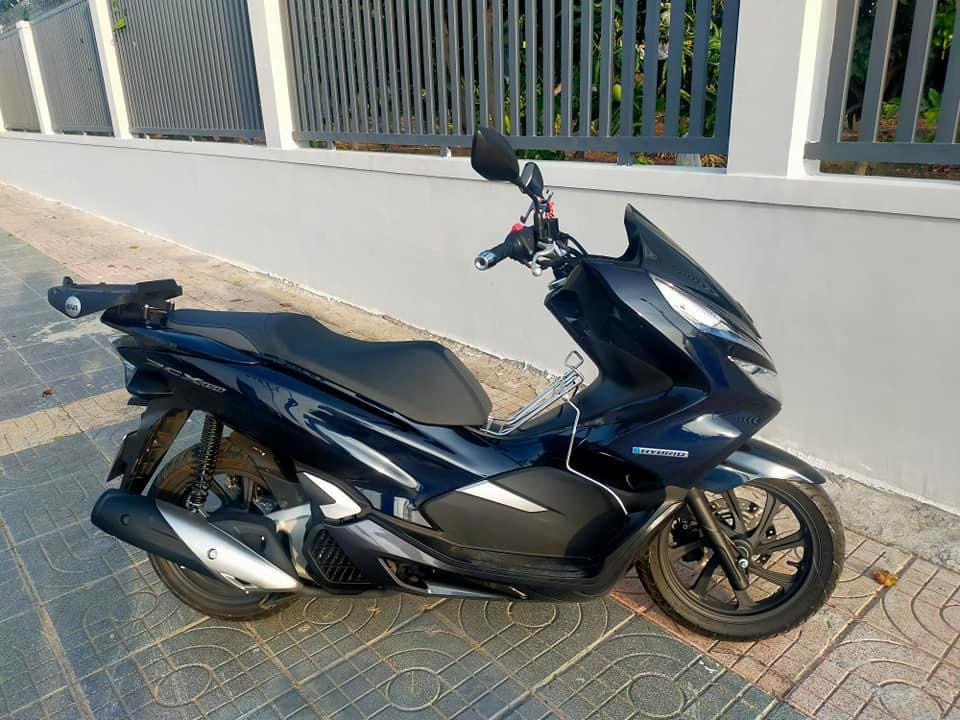
2019 Honda PCX 150 Hybrid

In April 2018 Honda launched the PCX Hybrid series for both the 125 and 150 cc models which features a 48-volt lithium-ion battery. The model comes with two motor assist modes, D for comfort riding and S with a more power for a sporty ride. The instrument panel displays the motor assist mode, the lithium battery charge status and the remaining charge.

==== Performance ====
Some performance tests listed here were conducted by GridOto from Indonesia in March 2018.

Parameter	Time
0–60 km/h (37 mph)	5.2 s
0–80 km/h (50 mph)	9.4 s
0–100 km/h (62 mph)	17.2 s
0–100 m (330 ft)	7.8 s @ 73.9 km/h (45.9 mph)
0–201 m (1/8 mile)	12.3 s @ 88.9 km/h (55.2 mph)
0–402 m (1/4 mile)	19.7 s @ 103.9 km/h (64.6 mph)
Top speed (on speedometer)	118 km/h (73 mph)
Top speed (Racelogic)	111.2 km/h (69.1 mph)

=== Electric (EF01) ===
Leases of the PCX Electric began in Japan on November 30, 2018, with lease availability limited to corporations. The PCX Electric has an interior permanent magnet traction motor with peak and continuous rated outputs of 4.2 and 0.98 kW (5.63 and 1.31 hp), respectively, drawing from two removable Honda Mobile Power Pack batteries connected in series; each battery provides 50.4 V and 20.8 A-hr, giving the scooter a range of 42 km (26 mi). Honda launched a personal lease trial for the PCX Electric in Romblon in 2019.

== 2021-2024 (JK05) ==
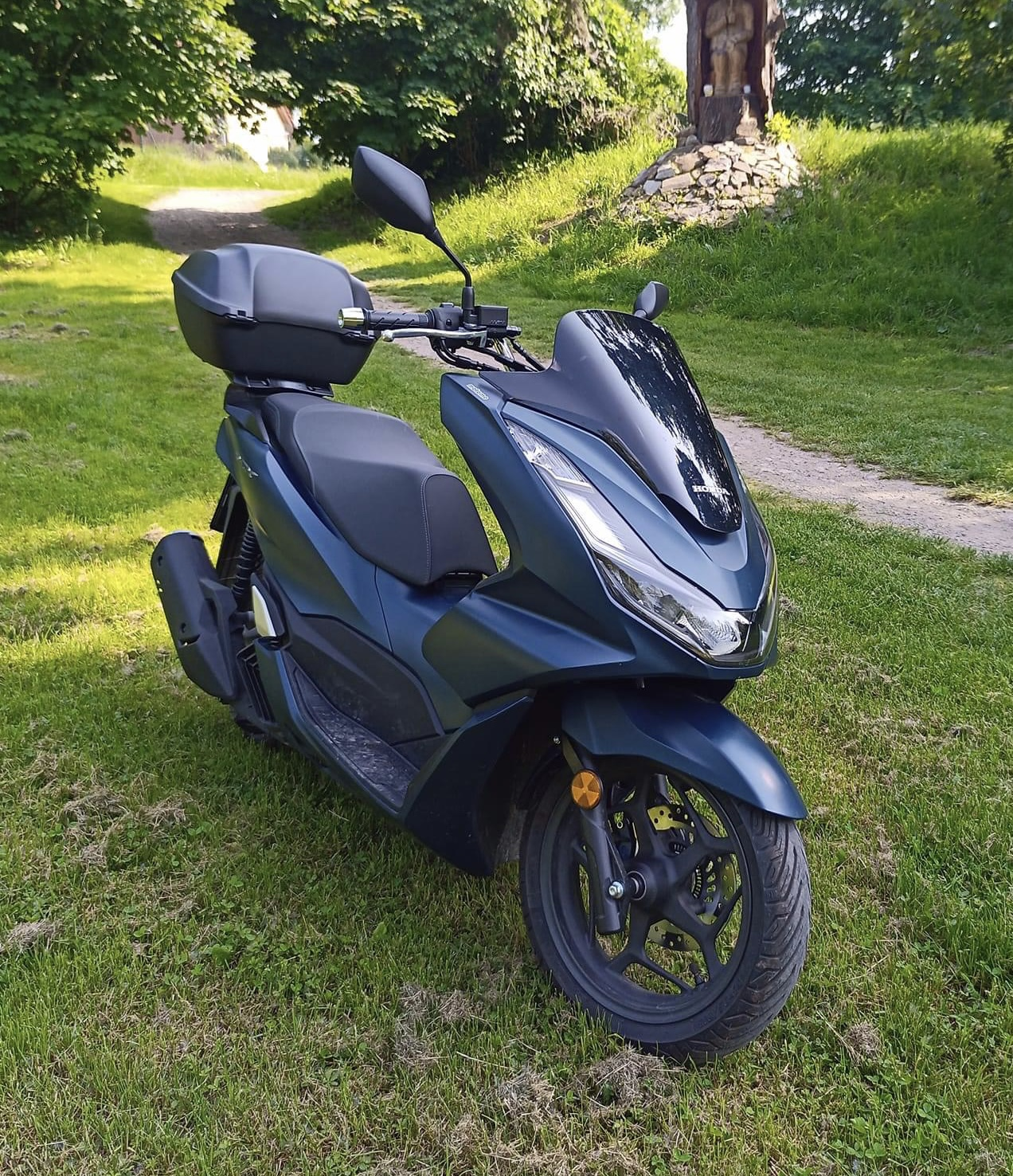
2021 Honda PCX 125

Also known as PCX 125/160 ESP+. This 3rd generation of the PCX received a new facelift. To meet Euro 5 emission standards the engine changed to a 4-valve liquid cooled design producing 12.3 horsepower. The scooter has a redesigned duplex steel "cradle" frame, with additional storage space under the seat (30.4L), but keeping the weight to 130kg. Fuel tank capacity is 8.1 litres giving a range approaching 240 miles (~130 mpg).

Other improvements include traction control (Honda Selectable Torque Control), a Smart Key (keyless) ignition system, a new LCD display, and a glovebox with a USB-C charging port inside (some models may still retain an old key start). The scooter has ABS as standard, and features a 220 mm disc at the front, with a conventional rear 130mm drum brake.

== 2024-present ==
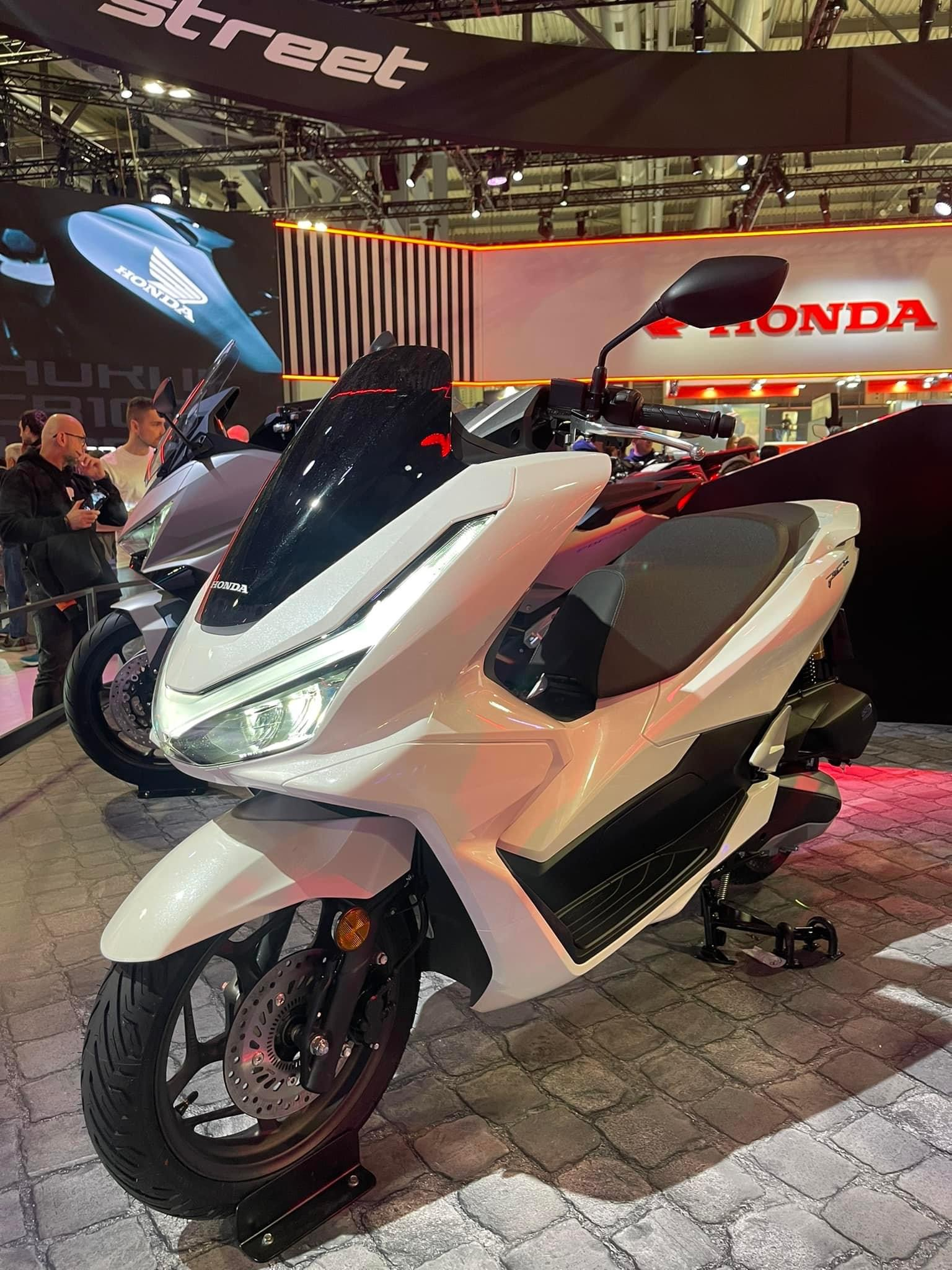
2025 Honda PCX 125

The 2024 model of the PCX was unveiled at EICMA.

== Technology ==
The global version of the Honda PCX is equipped with an idling stop system, which automatically shuts off the engine after a few seconds of idle. This feature is not included on the US/Canada model due to safety concerns, having a kill switch and a parking brake instead. To prevent excessive wear on a separate starter motor, the Honda PCX uses its alternator by supplying power to the stator (see Brushless DC electric motor). As a result, engine start is completely muted. This same technology was released in the new 2018 Honda Goldwing.

Other Honda 125/150 scooters with eSP share a common engine with the Honda PCX.

== Gallery ==
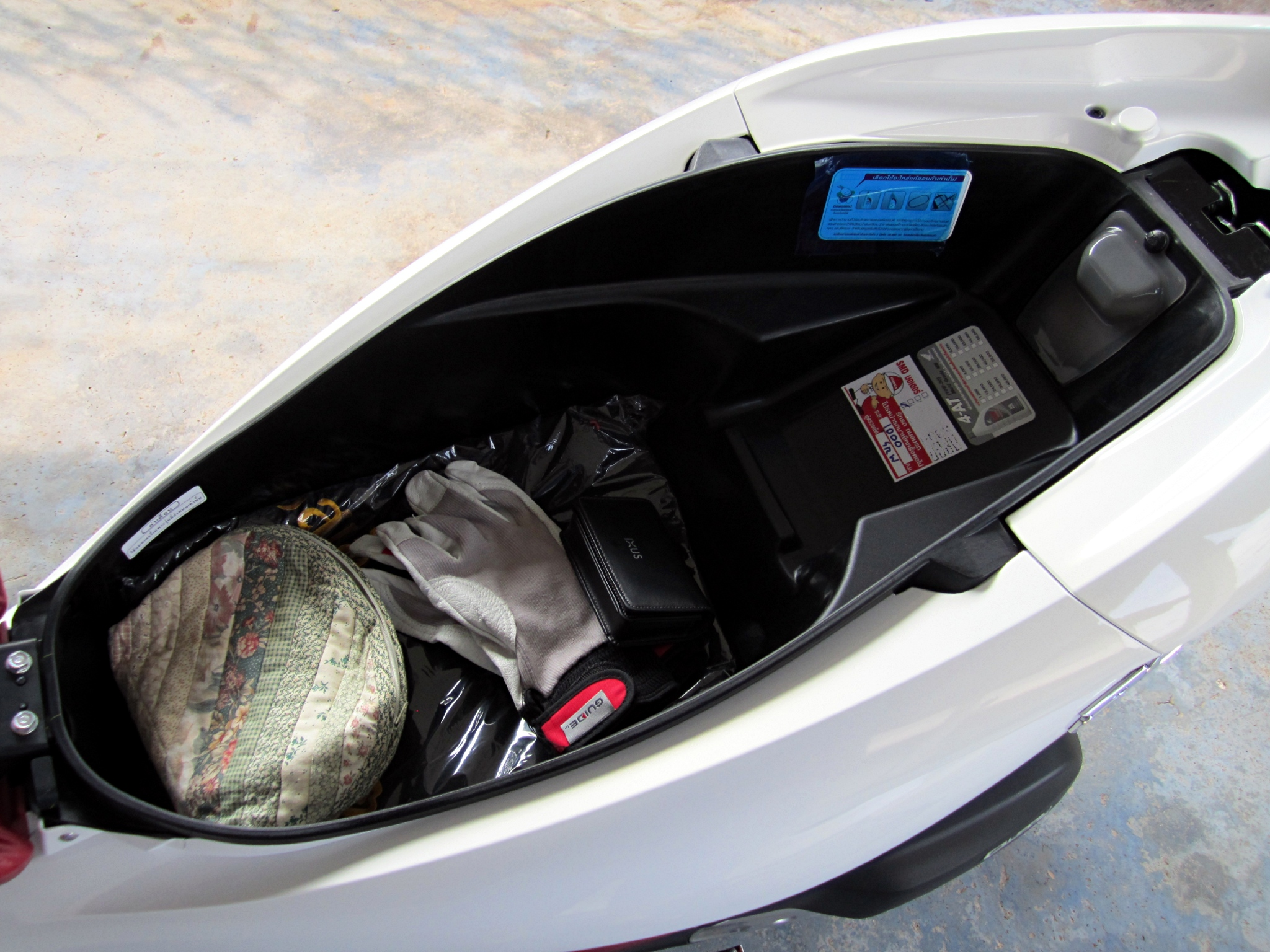
Honda PCX underseat storage space

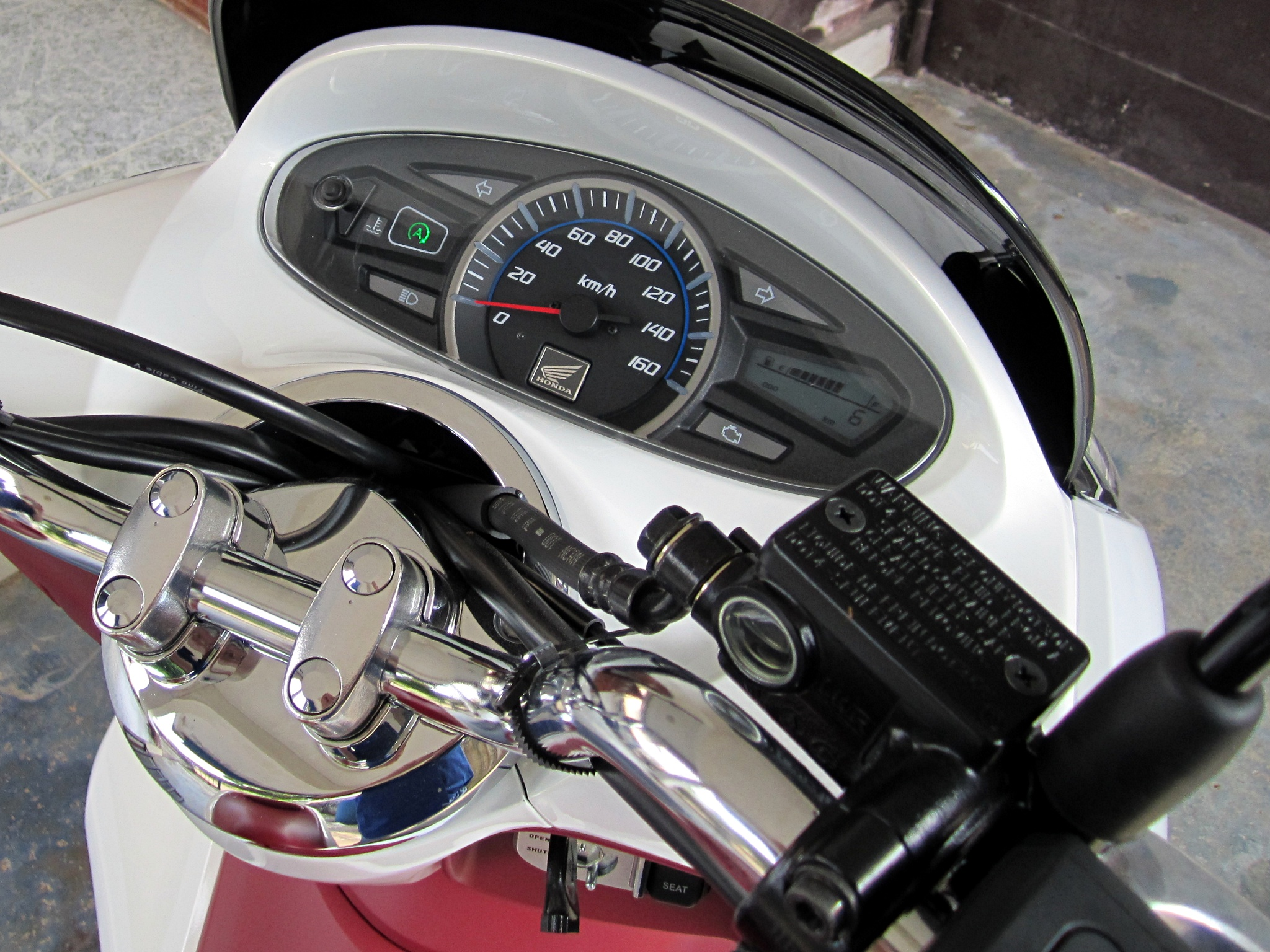
Handlebar and instrument panel

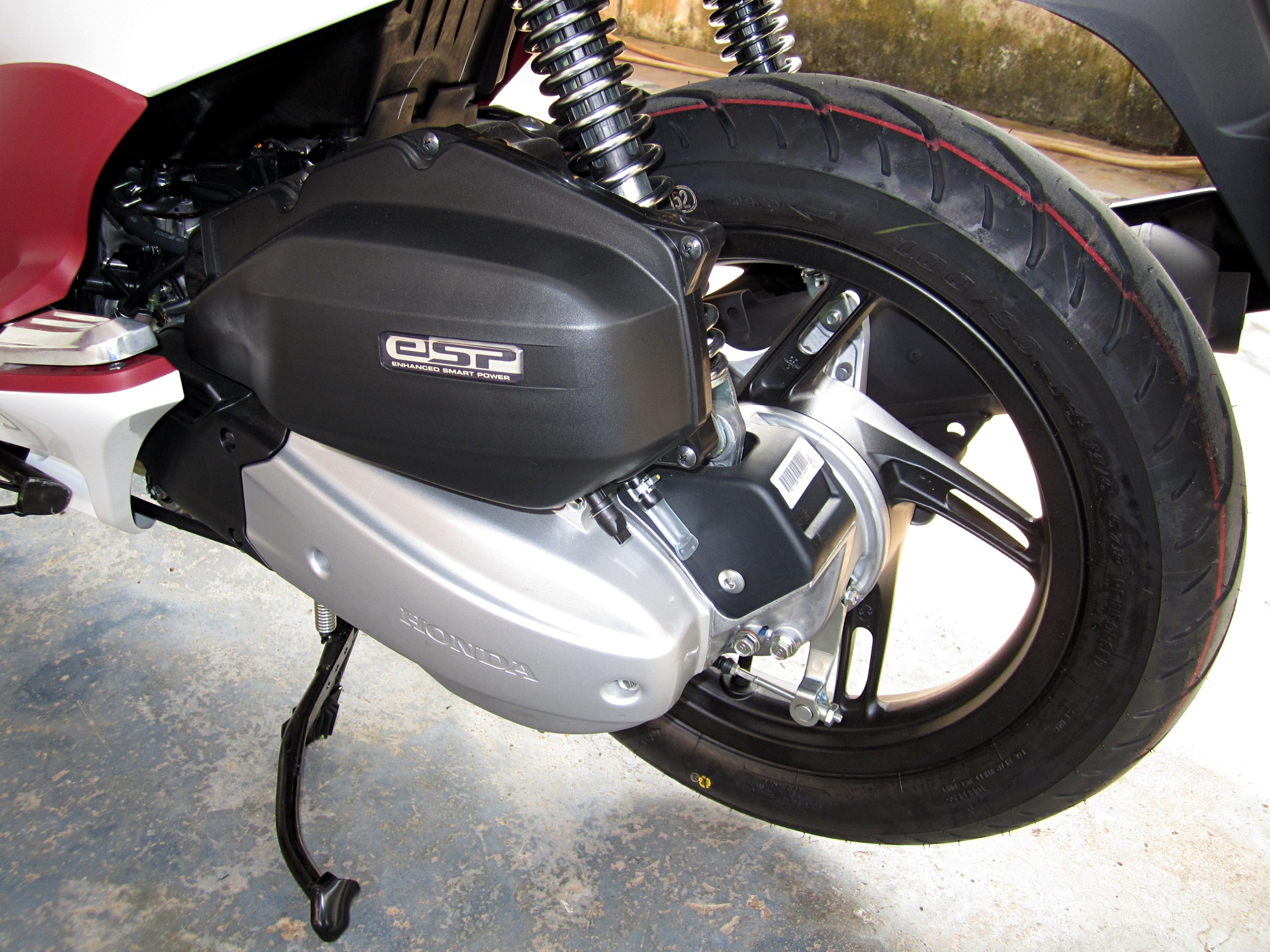
Rear suspension, air filter and variator block

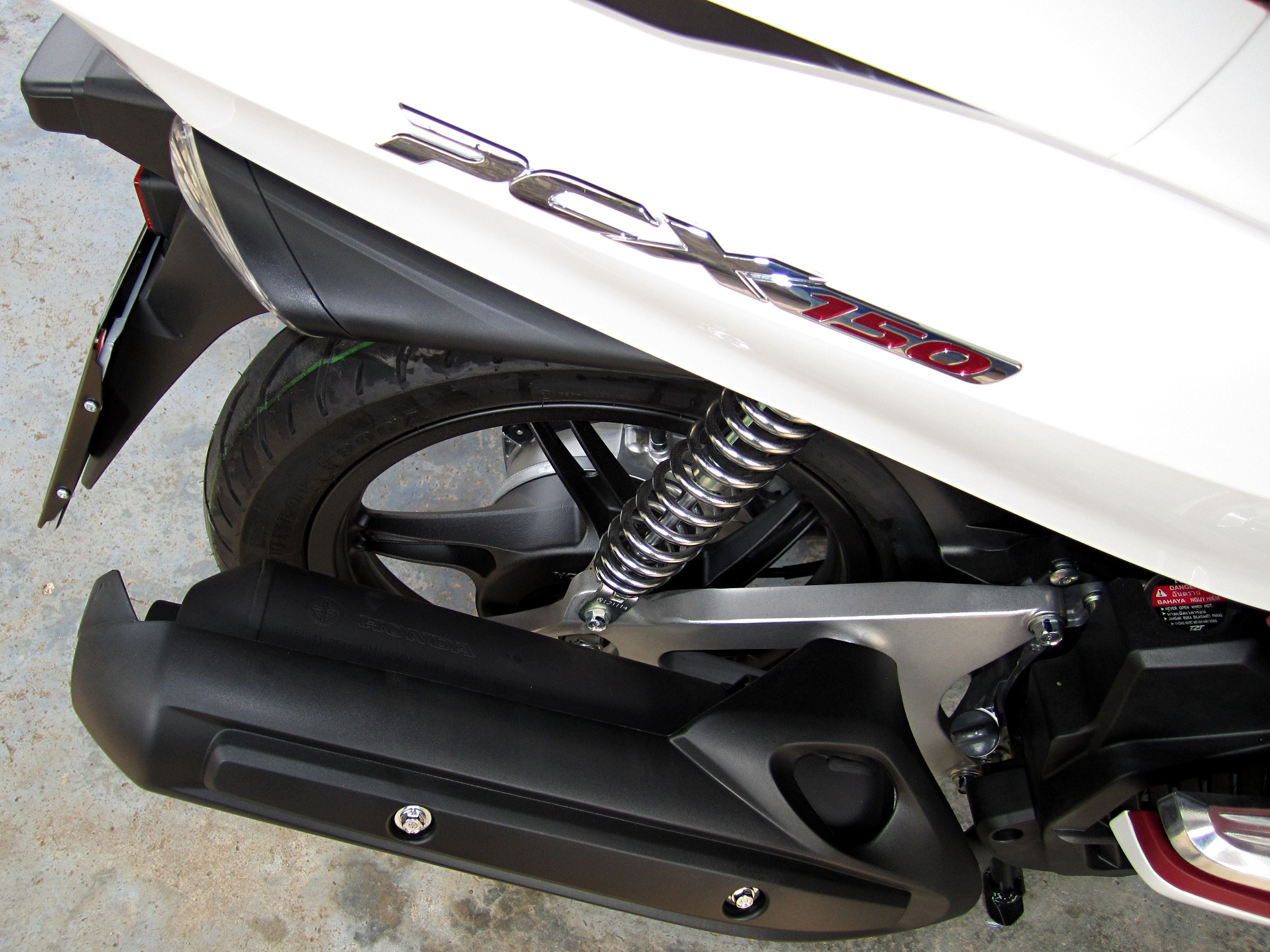
PCX150 logo and muffler

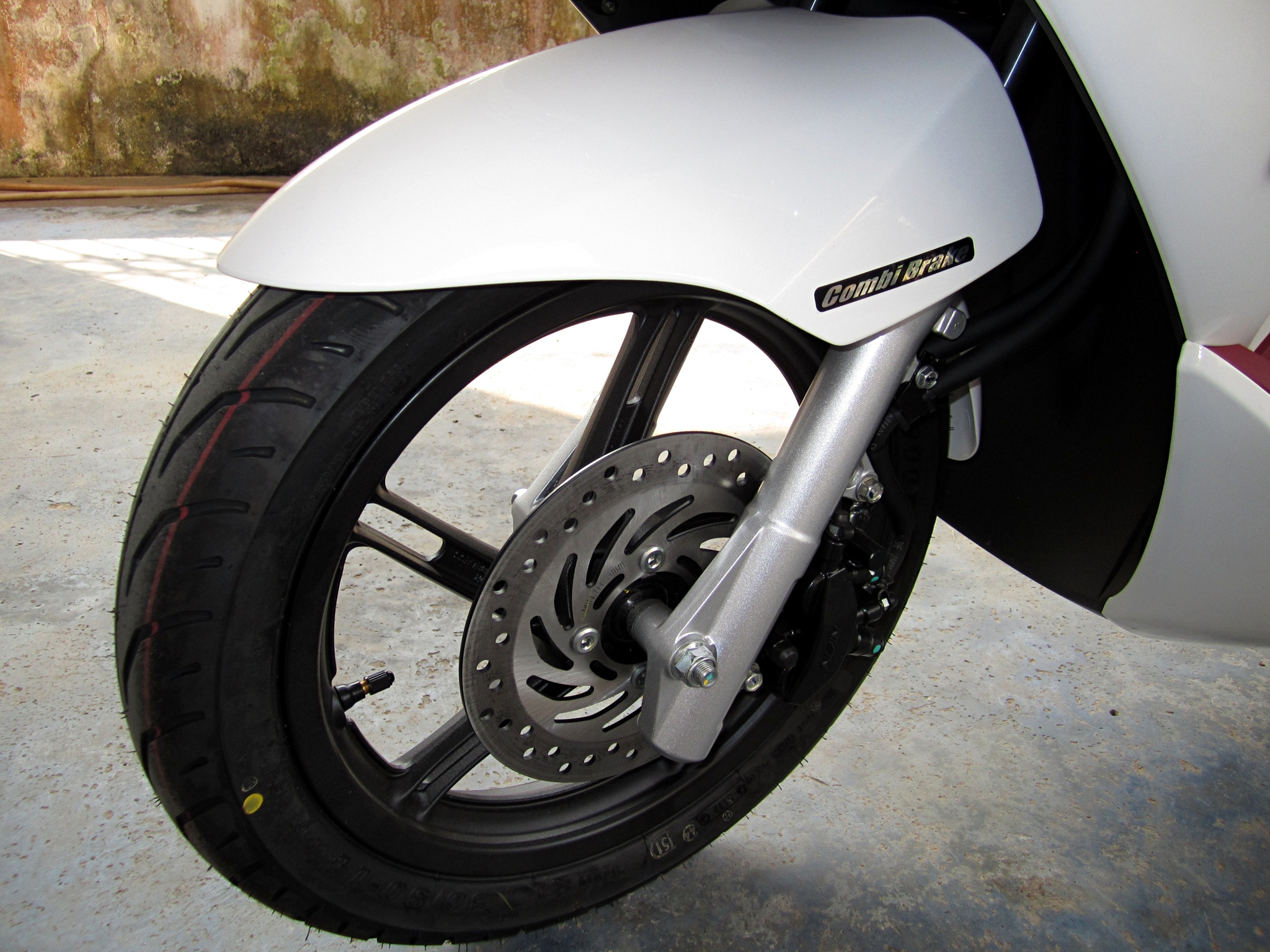
Front fork with Combined Brake System
