= Honda Benly =

Parallel-twin motorcycle

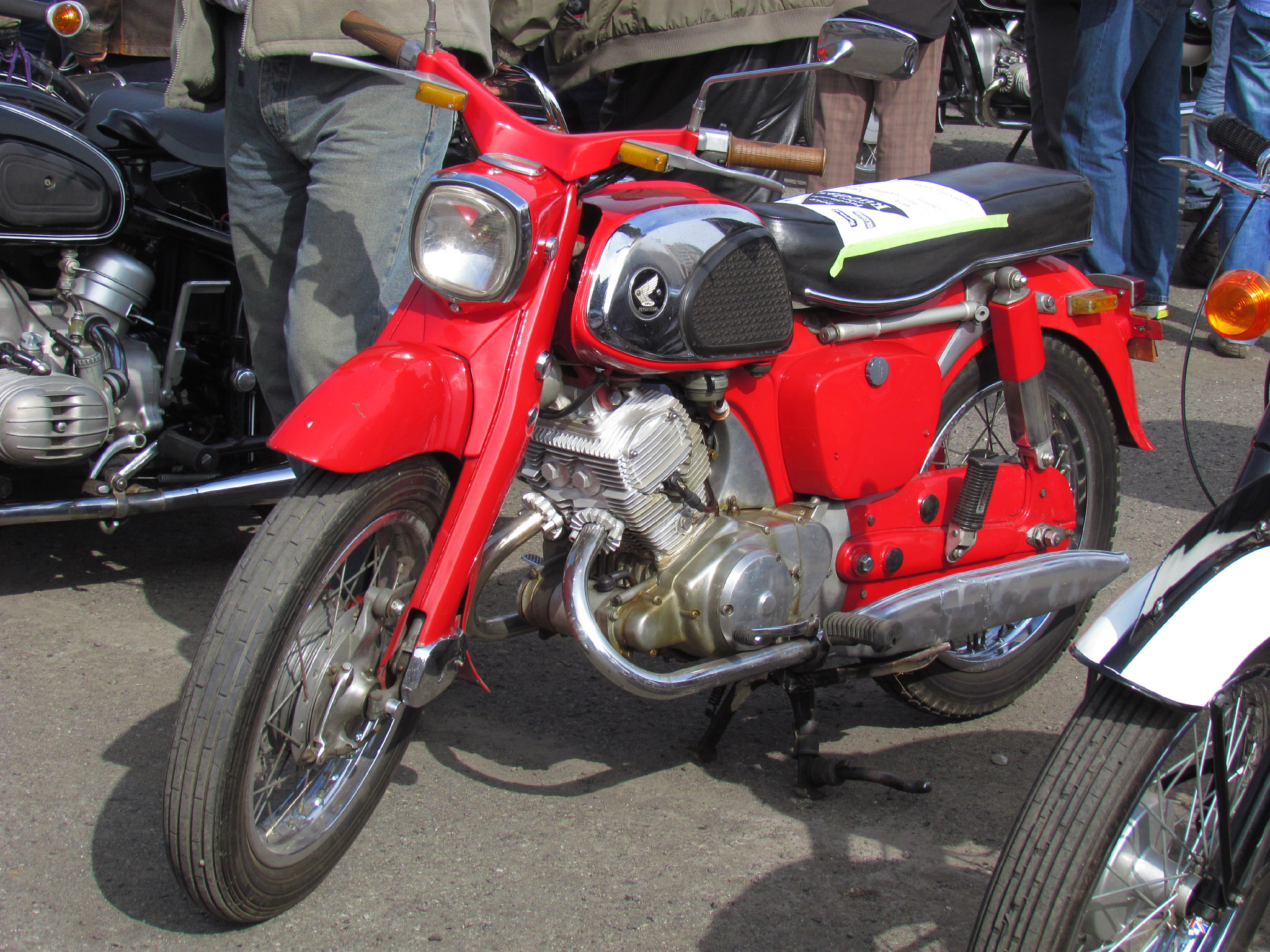
1960 Honda C92 Benly

The Honda C92 Benly is a 125 cc (7.6 cu in) parallel-twin motorcycle made by Honda from 1959 through 1965. Running concurrently were the CB92 Sports and the slightly larger C95 150 cc (9.2 cu in), called the CA92 and CA95 in the US. These twins took their styling and design cues from the larger-displacement Honda C71, C76, C72, C77 Dream series.

A separate model, the Honda CD125TC Benly, was sold under the Benly name in the United Kingdom from 1982 to 1985. The Benly name was revived in 2011 for a line of commercial scooters sold in Japan.

== Description ==
The name Benly comes from the Japanese word benri (Japanese: ベンリィ; meaning convenient).

The frame was a pressed-steel, fully-welded design with the front end carrying the steering head and the rear end forming the deeply valanced mudguard. The front forks were pressed steel and carried the front mudguard. Front suspension was of the leading link type. Rear suspension was by fully enclosed telescopic dampers. Front and rear brakes were six-inch single-leading-shoe type in full-width hubs. Wheels were 16-inch.

The engine was a straight- or parallel-twin, four stroke with two valves per cylinder operated by a chain-driven overhead camshaft. The compression ratio of the C92 was 8.3:1, and the C95's was 9.7:1. Honda's claimed horsepower for the C92 was 11.5 hp (8.6 kW) at 9,500 rpm and 16.5 hp (12.3 kW) at 10,000 rpm for the C95. The claimed torque was 0.9 kg⋅m (8.8 N⋅m; 6.5 lb⋅ft) at 8,200 rpm for the C92 and 1.25 kg⋅m (12.3 N⋅m; 9.0 lb⋅ft) at 9,000 rpm for the C95. They had a 10.1 L (2.2 imp gal; 2.7 US gal) fuel tanks, and single 18 mm (C92) or 20 mm (C95) carburettors. The primary drive was by helical-cut gears to a multi-plate clutch running in oil which lubricated both the engine and the four-speed gearbox, and a fully enclosed chain final drive. The electrical system was six volts on early models, 12 volt on later models and an electric starter was a standard fitment on all models.

== C92 and C95 ==
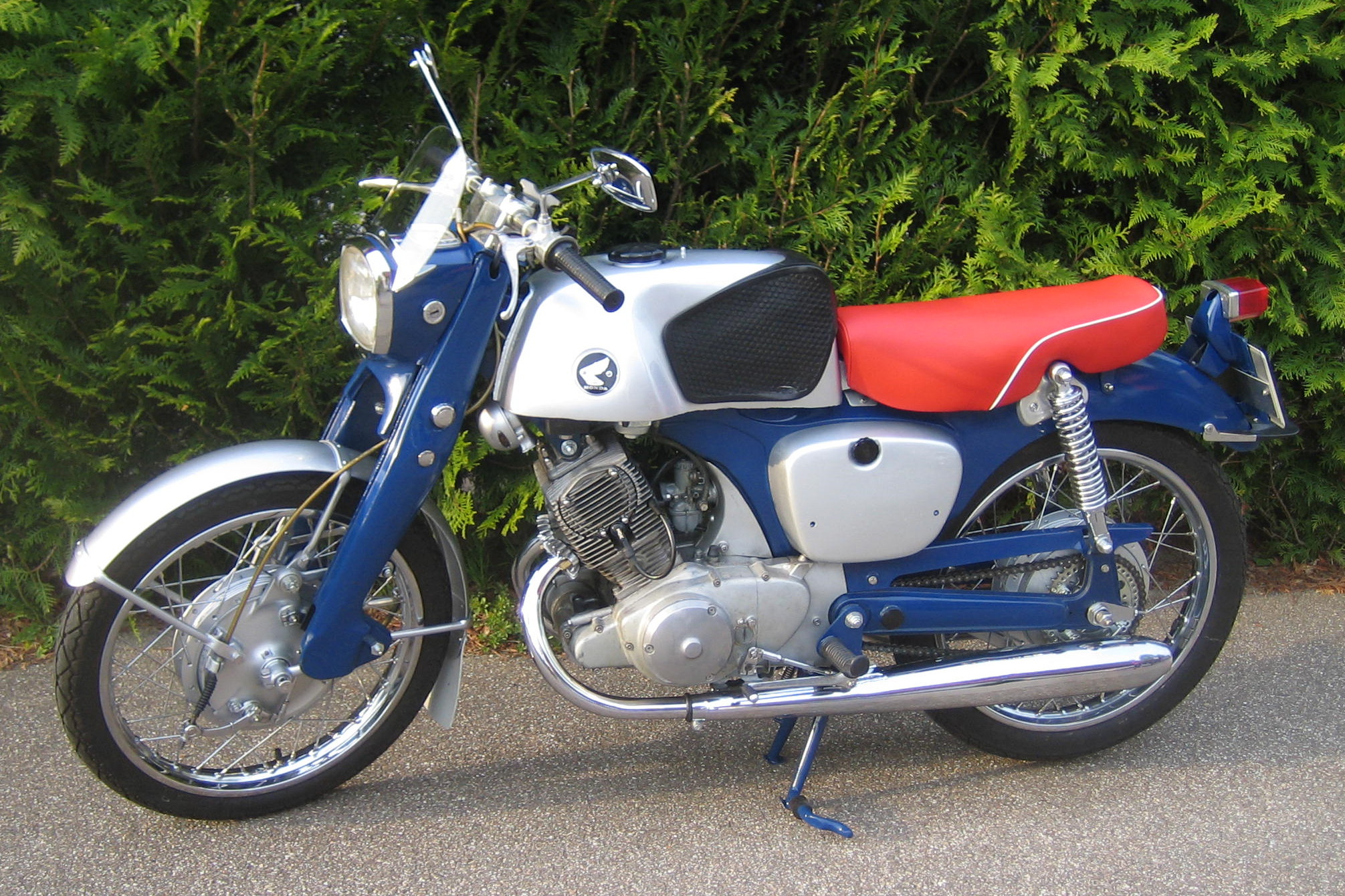
Honda CB92 125cc

Cosmetically, the C92 and C95 (called CA92 and CA95 in the US) differed mainly in their handlebars. The European bikes had flat pressed steel bars and the American bikes had raised tubular bars but when the C95 was brought to Europe, it was equipped with the raised tubular bars. There was also a CS92 which had a high-level scrambler style exhaust system.

The Honda CB92 is the lineup's super sports model. Cosmetically, it had briefer mudguards made with aluminium and small chain-guard. The fuel tank was larger, bearing resemblance to the prototype CB71 and CE71 tanks, while holding 10.5 litres (2.3 imp gal). The rear suspension had exposed springs. Both hubs were 8 inch magnesium not shared with other models. Its braking were by drum brakes with the front being a twin-leading-shoe type. Both wheels were 18 inch. The engine had higher compression pistons of 10:1. Early engine blocks were iron while later models changed to aluminium. Quoted HP/rpm was 15/10,500 and torque in kg.m/rpm was 1.06/9,000. The crankshaft of the CB92 was supported by three main bearings instead of two in the standard engine.

== Commercial scooters (2011–present) ==
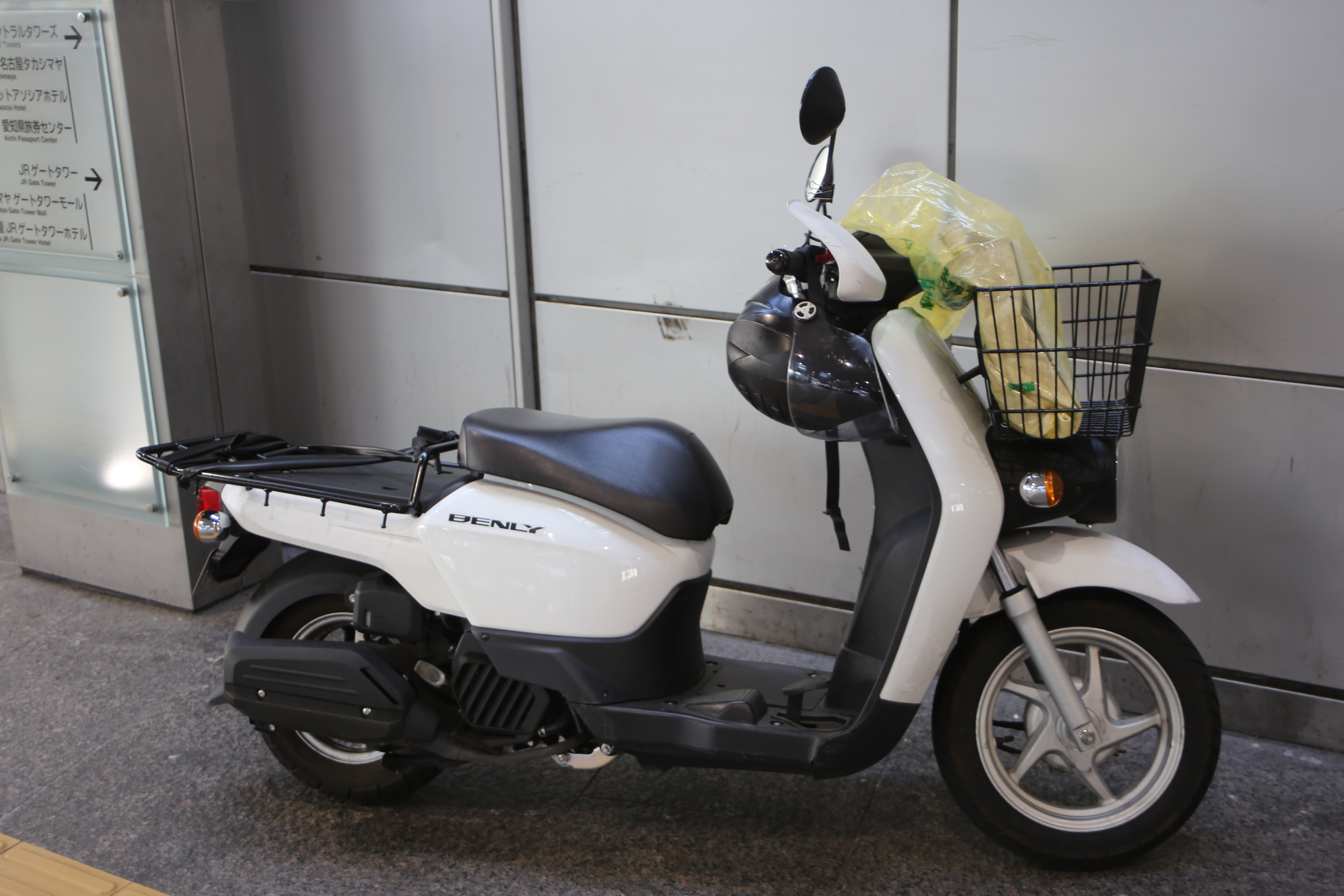
Benly Pro

In September 2011, Honda released the Benly and Benly Pro (model JBH-AA03), 50 cc-class scooters intended for commercial use. They are imported to Japan from Guangzhou, where they are assembled under the Wuyang Honda brand. The Pro model is equipped with a foot pedal for the brake and a front basket. Both models used the AA03E, an air-cooled four-stroke single-cylinder engine with a maximum output of 2.8 kW (3.8 hp) (at 8250 RPM) and 3.5 N⋅m (2.6 lbf⋅ft) (at 6500 RPM). Both models were rated with a fuel consumption rating of 66.0 km/L (186 mpg_{‑imp}; 155 mpg_{‑US}) at a steady 30 km/h (19 mph) and included 10 L (2.2 imp gal; 2.6 US gal) fuel tank. They included an automatic transmission and were designed with a low cargo area and seat height for convenience.

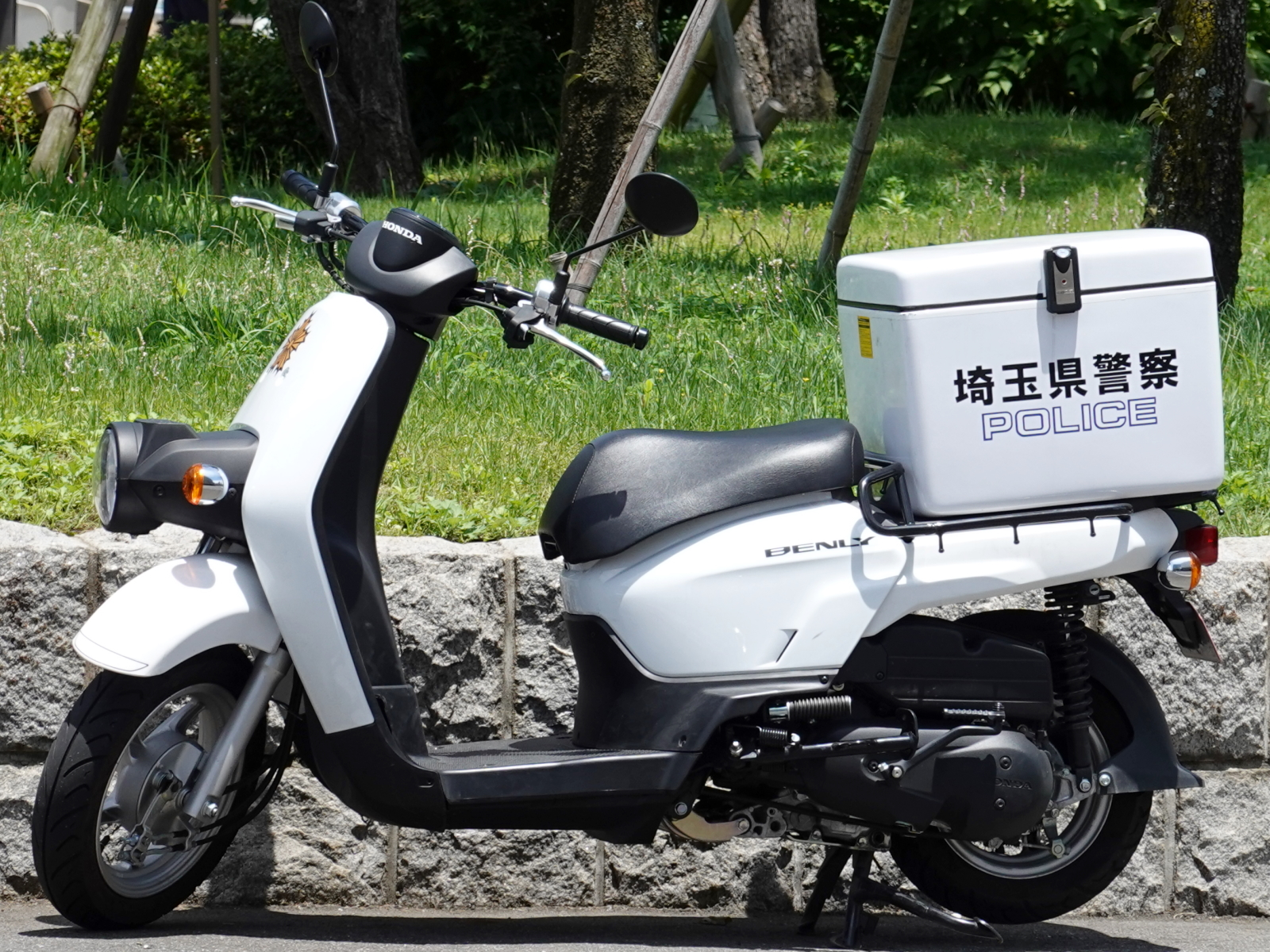
Benly 110 used by police force of Saitama Prefecture

They were supplemented by the Benly 110 and Benly 110 Pro (model EBJ-JA09) in January 2012, which were equipped with a larger, more powerful JA09E engine and were capable of carrying a higher cargo weight. The JA09E displaced 107 cc (6.5 cu in) and had a maximum output of 5.8 kW (7.8 hp) at 7000 RPM and 8.6 N⋅m (6.3 lbf⋅ft) at 5000 RPM, giving the scooters a fuel consumption rate of 53.0 km/L (150 mpg_{‑imp}; 125 mpg_{‑US}) at a steady 60 km/h (37 mph).

In 2015, the Benly and Benly Pro (model JBH-AA05) were updated with the AA05E, a water-cooled single-cylinder engine with a maximum output of 3.2 kW (4.3 hp) (at 7750 RPM) and 4.2 N⋅m (3.1 lbf⋅ft) (at 6000 RPM) and fuel consumption of 65.2 km/L (184 mpg_{‑imp}; 153 mpg_{‑US}) at a steady 30 km/h (19 mph). The Benly 110 and 110 Pro continued with slight changes to improve maintainability. Second generations of the Benly/Pro (2BH-AA05) and the Benly 110/110 Pro (2BJ-JA09) were launched in late 2017 to meet new emissions standards. Benly 110 production was discontinued in October 2022 to comply with 2020 emission regulations.

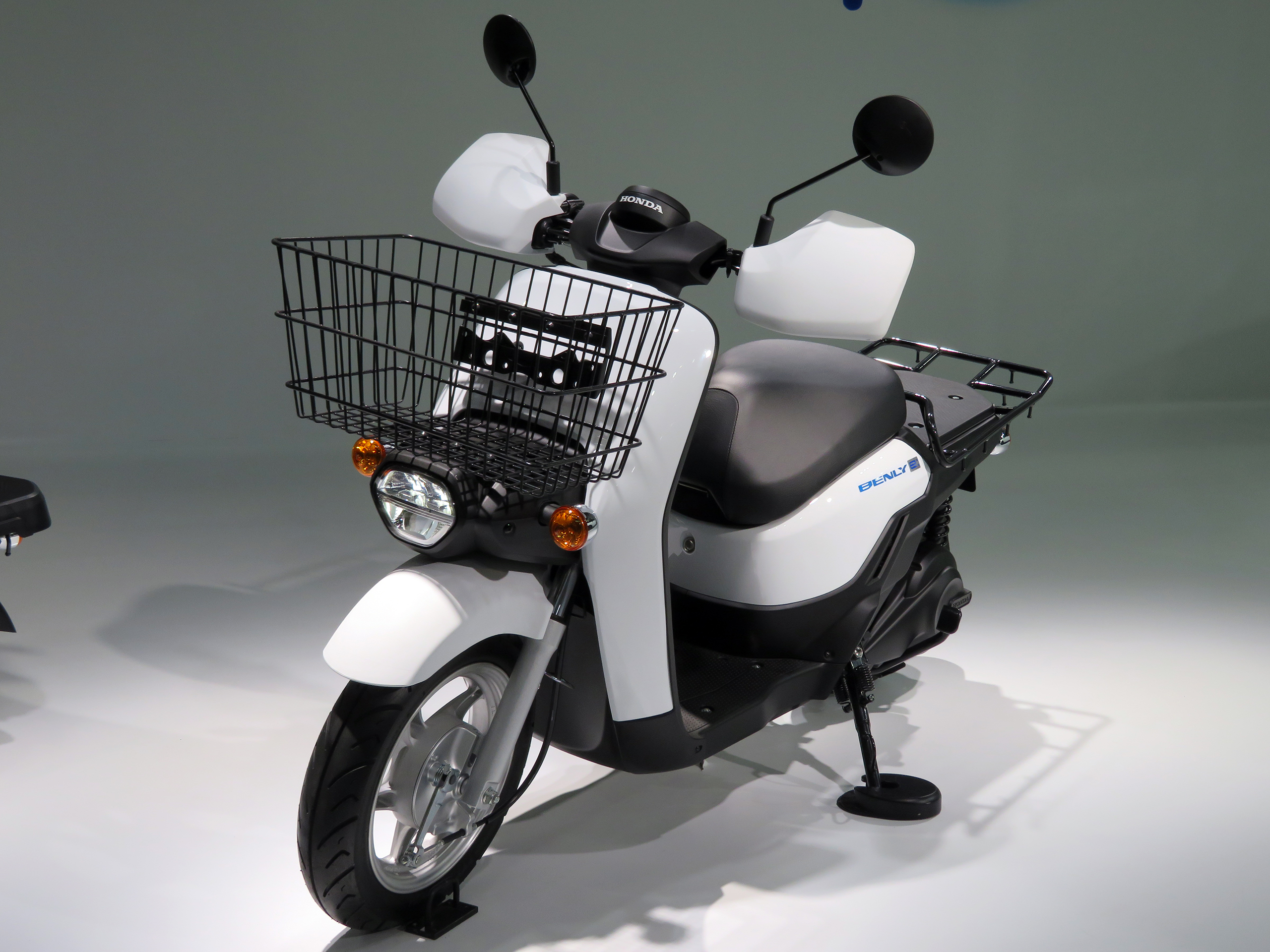
Benly e: I Pro

Honda launched the Benly e: line in December 2019, available in four different models:

- Benly e: I (Model ZAD-EF07, corresponding to Benly)
- Benly e: I Pro (ZAD-EF08, similar to Benly Pro)
- Benly e: II (ZAD-EF10, Benly 110)
- Benly e: II Pro (ZAD-EF11, Benly 110 Pro)

The Benly e: I models are equipped with the EF07M AC synchronous traction motor, which has a peak output of 2.8 kW (3.8 hp) at 3000 RPM and 13 N⋅m (9.6 lbf⋅ft) at 2000 RPM and a continuous output of 0.58 kW (0.78 hp). They are equipped with two Honda Mobile Power Pack (MPP) removable lithium-ion batteries, giving these scooters an estimated range of 87 km (54 mi) at a steady 30 km/h (19 mph). The Benly e: II models are equipped with a more powerful EF10M traction motor, which has a peak output of 4.2 kW (5.6 hp) at 3900 RPM and 15 N⋅m (11 lbf⋅ft) at 1500 RPM and a continuous output of 0.98 kW (1.31 hp). The estimated range of the Benly e: II models is 43 km (27 mi) at a steady 60 km/h (37 mph).

== See also ==
- List of motorcycles of the 1950s
