= Honda EM1 e: =

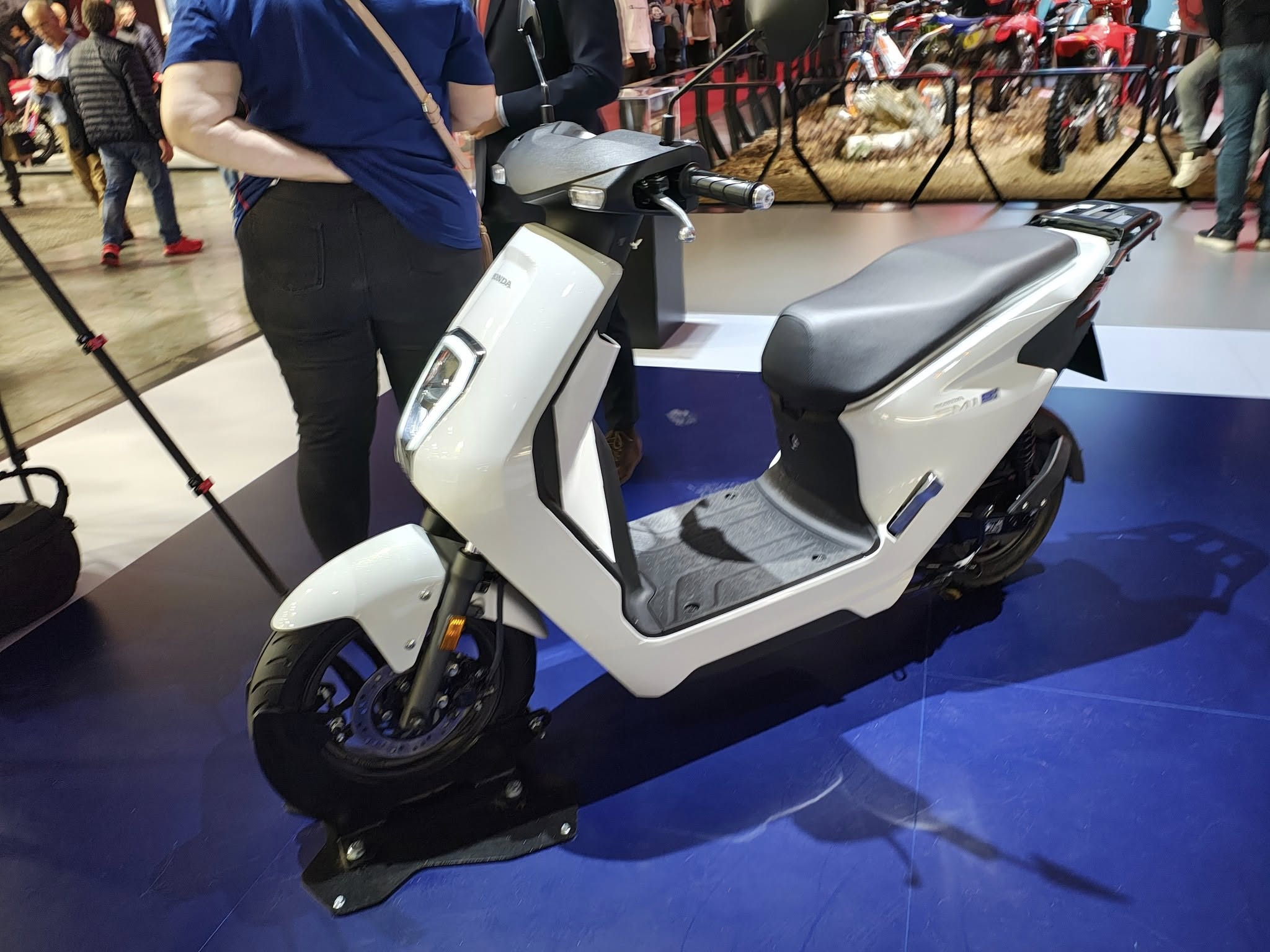
- Manufacturer: Honda
- Also called: Honda ICON e: (Indonesia, Pakistan)
- Production: 2023–present
- Assembly: Japan; Indonesia
- Class: Electric scooter
- Top speed: 28 mph (45 km/h)
- Power: 2.3 hp (1.7 kW)
- Torque: 66.4 lb⋅ft (90.0 N⋅m)
- Transmission: 1-speed hub motor
- Suspension: F: telescopic fork R: twin rear shocks, double tube dampers
- Brakes: F: 1-piston caliper, 190 mm (7.5 in) disc R: 110 mm (4.3 in) drum
- Tires: F: 90/90R-12; R: 100/90R-10
- Wheelbase: 1,300 mm (51 in)
- Dimensions: L: 1,860 mm (73 in); W: 680 mm (27 in); H: 1,080 mm (43 in)
- Seat height: 740 mm (29 in)
- Weight: 95 kg (209 lb) (dry)

The Honda EM1 e: also called Honda ICON e: is an electric scooter produced by Honda as an urban personal mobility vehicle with limited range, suitable for beginners.

== History ==
The EM1 e: is based on the Wuyang-Honda U-Go scooter marketed in China, with some differences including the use of a single Honda Mobile Power Pack (MPP) as the swappable traction storage battery. It was unveiled at EICMA 2022 as the initial model in Honda's plans to launch 10 electric motorcycles and scooters by 2025. Technical details were announced in May 2023 upon the model's release in the United Kingdom; "EM" is an abbreviation for "electric moped". It is marketed as an electric equivalent for the 50 cc scooter class.

It is similar in size and design to the preceding Benly e:, which was released in April 2020 with four different models intended for commercial use such as light deliveries. The Benly e: scooters use two MPPs, providing a longer driving range than the EM1 e:.

== Design ==
The EM1 e: is designed to accommodate a driver and one passenger, seated in tandem on the pillion behind the driver. Foldable footpegs are provided for the passenger.

=== Powertrain and battery ===
The EM1 e: has a claimed range of 41.3 km (25.7 mi) in its normal operating mode, rising to 48.0 km (29.8 mi) in ECON mode. Testing indicated a real-world range of 22.1 mi (35.6 km). The in-wheel EF16M motor has a peak output of 1.7 kW (2.3 hp) at 540 RPM and 90.0 N⋅m (66.4 lbf⋅ft) of torque at 25 RPM (continuous rating 0.58 kW (0.78 hp)), giving the EM1 a top speed of 45 km/h (28 mph). The estimated range is 53 km (33 mi) at a steady 30 km/h (19 mph).

For comparison, the Benly e: I and e: I Pro have a maximum cargo capacity of 30 kg (66 lb) and use the EF07M AC synchronous traction motor with a maximum output of 2.8 kW (3.8 hp) at 3000 RPM and 13 N⋅m (9.6 lbf⋅ft) at 2000 RPM (continuous rating 0.58 kW (0.78 hp)), giving an estimated range of 87 km (54 mi) at a steady 30 km/h (19 mph). The Benly e: II and e: II Pro have a maximum cargo capacity of 60 kg (130 lb) and use the EF10M AC synchronous traction motor with a maximum output of 4.2 kW (5.6 hp) at 3000 RPM and 15 N⋅m (11 lbf⋅ft) at 2000 RPM (continuous rating 0.98 kW (1.31 hp)), giving an estimated range of 43 km (27 mi) at a steady 60 km/h (37 mph).

The single, removable Honda Mobile Power Pack has a voltage of 50.3 V and capacity of 29.4 A-hr, accounting for 10.3 kg (23 lb) of the scooter's 95 kg (209 lb) mass.
