= Honda NX650 Dominator =

Dual-sport motorcycle

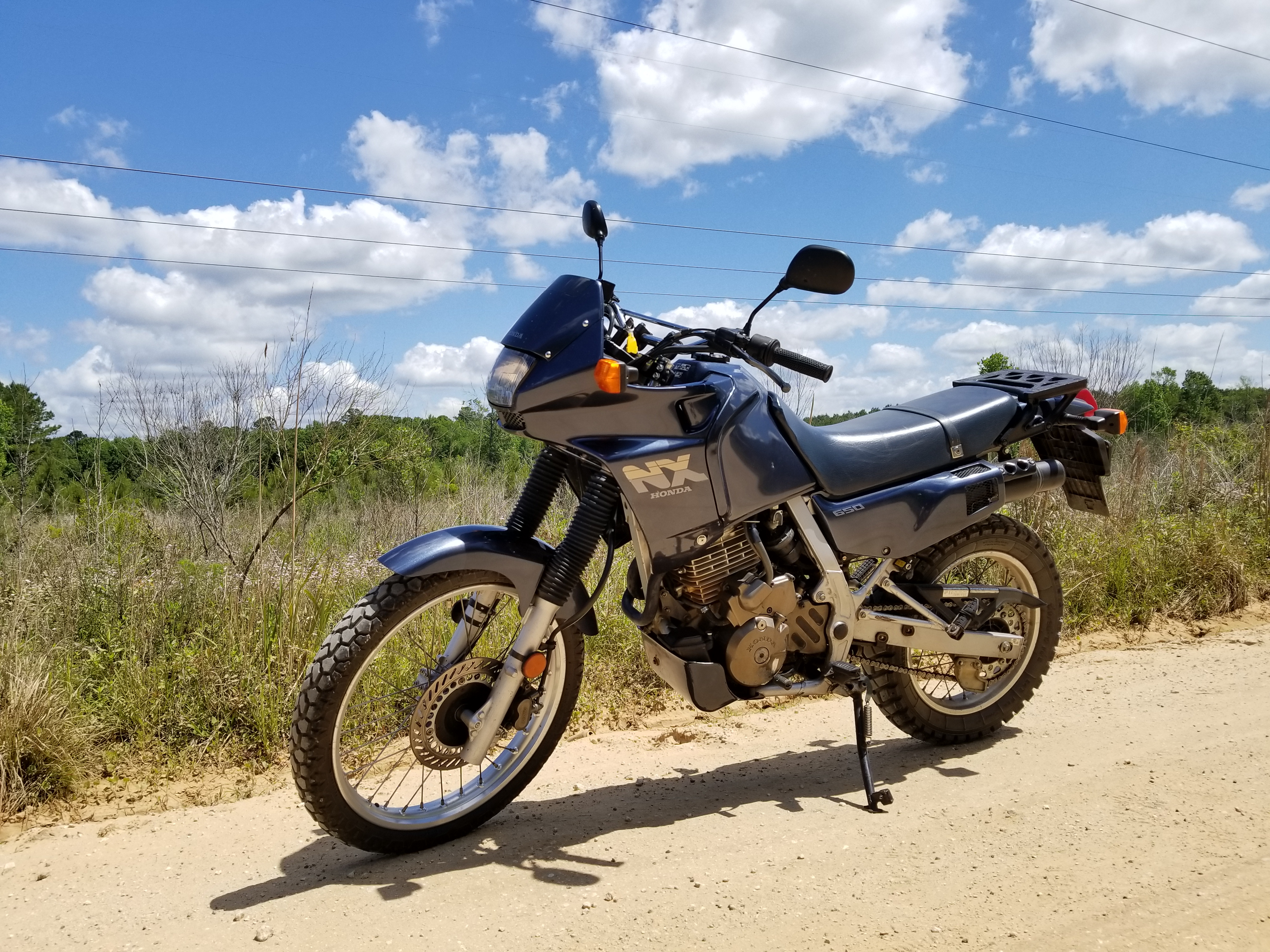
- Manufacturer: Honda
- Production: 1988-2003
- Successor: Honda XR650L
- Class: Dual-sport
- Engine: 644 cc, single-cylinder, four-stroke engine
- Compression ratio: 8.3:1
- Power: 44.00 hp (32 kW) at 6000 rpm
- Torque: 39 lbf⋅ft (53 N⋅m) at 5000 rpm
- Ignition type: Electric start
- Transmission: 5-speed manual, chain final drive
- Brakes: Front: disc / Rear: disc
- Tires: 90/90-21 54S (front); 120/90-17 64S (rear)
- Wheelbase: 56.4 in (143.5 cm)
- Dimensions: L: 86.4 in (219.5 cm); W: 35 in (89 cm); H: 48 in (122 cm)
- Seat height: 34.3in (87 cm)
- Weight: 335 lb (152 kg) (dry); 370 lb (168 kg) (wet)
- Fuel capacity: 3.4 US gal, of which 0.66 US gal reserve (13 litres, of which 2.5 L is reserve)
- Fuel consumption: 45 mpg (19 kpl)
- Related: Honda XR600

The Honda NX650 Dominator is a dual-sport motorcycle. It was manufactured by Honda from 1988 to 2003. Between this period, several variants of the model were released with different fairing designs or changes to the mechanical systems. Reference can be seen to RD02 for early models or RD08 for later models.

== Design ==
Its engine is slightly larger than that of the XR600L, which debuted in 1985. The 97mm bore engine was enlarged to 100 mm and stroked from 80 to 82mm for 644cc. With 44 horsepower at 6,000 rpm, the engine had 53 N⋅m of torque at 5,000 rpm. A gear-driven counterbalancing system helps to smooth out vibrations created by the large single-cylinder engine. The compression ratio of 8.3:1 for the four valves is aided by a single chain-driven overhead camshaft. The intake is via a 40 mm Keihin constant-velocity carburettor, reaching as low as 5.2 L/100km (45 mpg) from 12.8 liters (3.4 gallons) in the tank. The bike features a dry-sump (frame carries oil supply) engine.

The Dominator has a dual exhaust located alongside the rear fender and its powertrain is a wet clutch powering a five-speed gearbox.

The non-adjustable fork has 41mm tubes and supplies 8.5 inches of travel; the rake is 28.5 degrees, and the trail is 4.5 inches. A fork brace is built into the underside of the fender. The front carries a 21-inch spoked wheel with a 90/90 tire. The motorcycle has a single front disc brake with a twin-piston caliper.

In the back, the single-shock setup allows for preload alterations, with rear-wheel travel at 7.5 inches. The rear carries a 17-inch spoked wheel with a 120/90 tire. The rear wheel features a drum brake on the US model, disk on later European models. The footpegs have rubber inserts, intended to appeal to urban riders. If a rider was interested in more off-road use, the inserts could be punched out, leaving saw-toothed metal pegs, which are useful in precarious situations.

== Sales ==
United States' sales of the NX650 were disappointing and it was withdrawn from the US market after only two years in 1990. The European version sold well and was marketed through 2003.

== Variants ==
Other variations of the NX650 included the NX125, NX150, NX200, NX250, NX350, NX400, and NX500.
