= Honda XRE300 =

Dual-purpose motorcycle

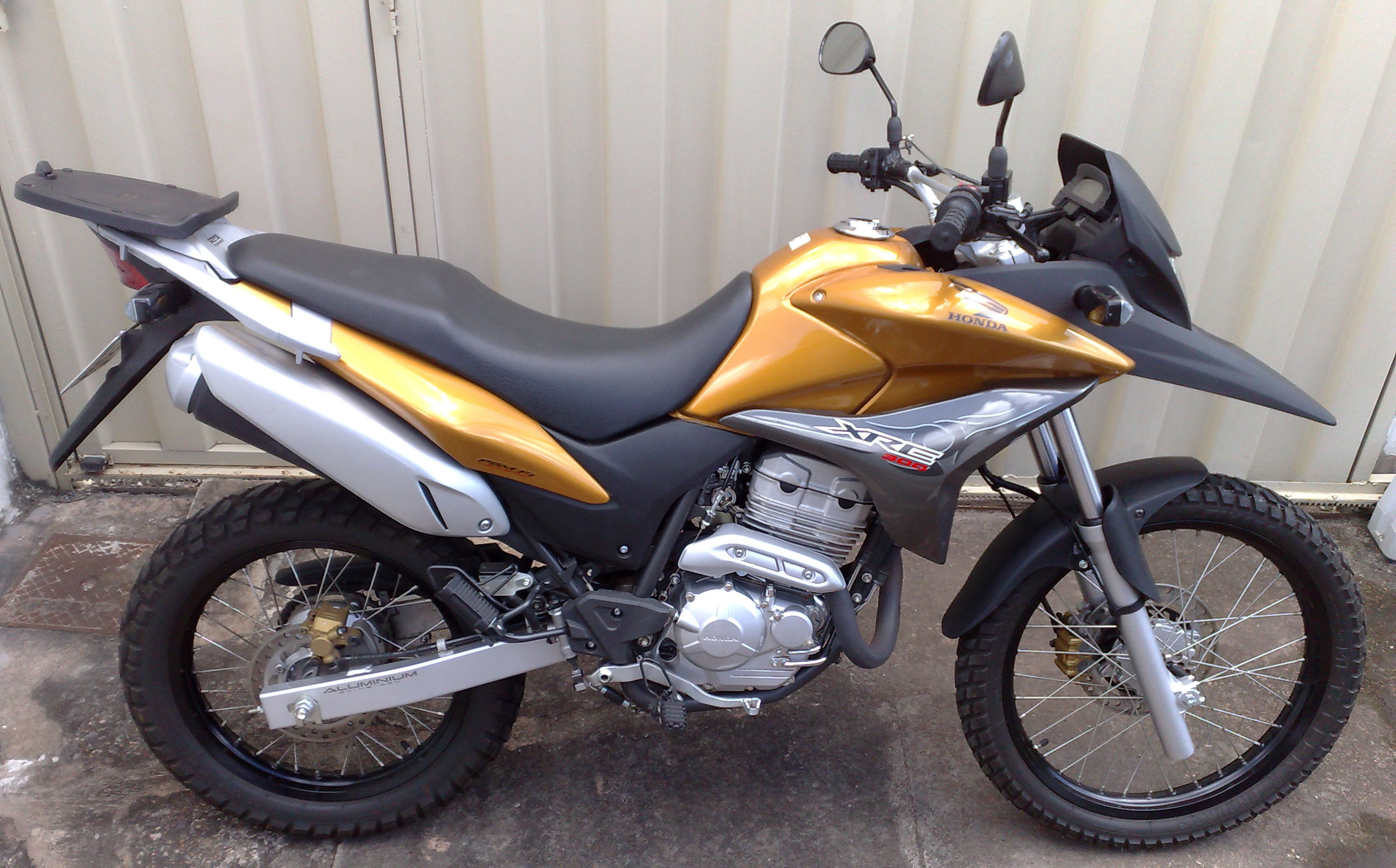
- Manufacturer: Honda
- Production: 2009–
- Predecessor: Honda XR250 Tornado; Honda NX-4 Falcon
- Class: Dual-sport
- Engine: 291 cc (17.8 cu in), DOHC, 4-valve, air-cooled, single
- Bore / stroke: 79 mm × 59.5 mm (3.11 in × 2.34 in)
- Compression ratio: 9.0:1
- Transmission: 5-speed, wet multi-plate clutch, chain drive, manual
- Suspension: Front: telescopic fork, 245 mm travel Rear: Pro-link 225 mm travel
- Brakes: Front: single 256 mm disc, two-piston caliper (base) or three-piston caliper (C-ABS); Rear: single 220 m disc, single-piston caliper Optional Combined ABS
- Tires: Front: 90/90 – 21"M/C (54S); Rear: 120/80 – 18"M/C (62S); Metzeler Enduro 3
- Wheelbase: 1,417 mm (55.8 in)
- Dimensions: L: 2,171 mm (85.5 in); W: 830 mm (33 in); H: 1,181 mm (46.5 in)
- Seat height: 860 mm (34 in)
- Fuel capacity: 13.6 L (3.6 US gal)
- Oil capacity: 2 L (0.53 US gal)

The Honda XRE 300 is a single-cylinder dual-sport motorcycle designed and manufactured by Honda in Brazil. It was launched in August 2009 to simultaneously replace the Japanese firm's two South American on/off-road motorcycles: the XR250 Tornado and the NX-4 Falcon. Unlike these motorcycles' 250 cc and 400 cc engines, the fuel-injected (Programmed fuel injection) 300 cc engine in the XRE300 meets Brazil's new PROMOT 3 emissions rules. It has an anti-lock brake (ABS) option.

Heavily based on its 250cc predecessor, the XRE300 is aimed at urban riders but can be used for light trail work. The XRE300 is used by motorized infantry brigades of the Brazilian army. In 2018 the Policia Nacional in Colombia acquire this model for their police officers, Cali, Bogota, Medellin started with it and moreover all country.

Developed as a dual-sport motorcycle, the XRE 300 delivers an engine power close to 26 hp @ 7500 rpm offering a cruise speed average between 85 km/h and 90 km/h in the middle range of the tachometer (5000 rpm – 5500 rpm) with no compromise neither the bike durability, fuel consumption or rider comfort.

The display shows the top speed of 134 km/h just at the red line of the tachometer (9000 rpm).

The bike has a superior Trail off-road capability with an engine torque close to 27 Nm @ 6500 rpm giving excellent performance in the low and middle range of the revs (1500 rpm – 6500 rpm) such response is a goal with either sand, mud or gravel ride conditions.

Metzeler Enduro 3 Sahara tires are standard. These are 50% on-road / 50% off-road tires with self-cleaning treads, designed for good overall traction and braking on dry and wet roads.

== Models and Technical improvements ==
There are different versions of the same model:

- Brazil, Argentina first series 2009–2014.
- Brazil, Colombia 2015–2016. Since 2015 the motorcycle include new improvements such as:
  1. Power:
    1. Gasoline: 26,1 cv (25,73 hp) [19,18 kW] @ 7500 rpm.
    2. Ethanol: 26,3 cv (25,92 hp) [19,32 kW] @ 7500 rpm
  2. Torque:
    1. Gasoline: 2,81 kgfm [27,56 Nm] @ 6500 rpm
    2. Ethanol: 2,85 kgfm [27,95 Nm] @ 6500 rpm
  3. Dry Weight: XRE300 (144 kg), XRE300A (151 kg).
  4. Enhanced Fuel Injection system PGM-FI.
  5. Anti-lock braking system ABS (only for XRE300A models)
  6. New viscous air filter technology.
  7. New iridium spark plug.
  8. Fuel pump is inside the fuel tank.
- Brazil, Colombia, Mexico, 2017–2018.

Since 2017 the motorcycle have received some tech updates such as

1. Power (2,6% less than previous generation):
  1. Gasoline: 25,4 cv (25,04 hp) [18,67 kW] @ 7500 rpm.
  2. Ethanol: 25,6 cv (25,24 hp) [18,82 kW] @ 7500 rpm
2. Torque (1,8% less than previous generation):
  1. Gasoline: 2,76 kgfm [27,06 Nm] @ 6000 rpm
  2. Ethanol: 2,80 kgfm [27,45 Nm] @ 6000 rpm
3. Dry Weight: XRE300 STD (321 lb), XRE300 ABS (331 lb).
4. New digital LCD, including km/L measurement.
5. Improved spark plug air cooing duct.
6. Reoriented throttle cables at the handlebar side.
7. Combined braking system C-ABS (only for XRE300 ABS models).
8. New fairings design, colors and rally version fairings availability.
9. New articulated fuel cap.
- Brazil, Worldwide, 2019 – current
1. New front fender design.
2. New fairings design.
3. New head, tail lamp and turn signal lights design.
4. New black carrier design.

== Fuel technology ==
All the XRE Models can use either gasoline or ethanol, which Honda's PGM-FI system can detect and adapt to. Manual of model distributed in Guatemala states that a max. of 10% Ethanol is allowed within fuel.
