= CL-400 =

CL-400 or variation, may refer to:

== Vehicles ==
- Lockheed CL-400 Suntan, a proposed U.S. high altitude superfast spyplane of the late 1950s
- Canadair CL-44 (a.k.a. Rolls-Royce 400 PropJet, Canadair 400, CL-400), turboprop airliner
- Honda CL400, a 387cc single-cylinder motorcycle
- Mercedes-Benz CL 400, a luxury sedan, see Mercedes-Benz CL-Class

== Other uses ==
- IBM CL 400, the CL scripting language variant for OS/400, see Control Language

== See also ==
- Canadair CL-415, amphibious waterbomber
