= Honda NX250 =

Honda NX250 Honda AX-1
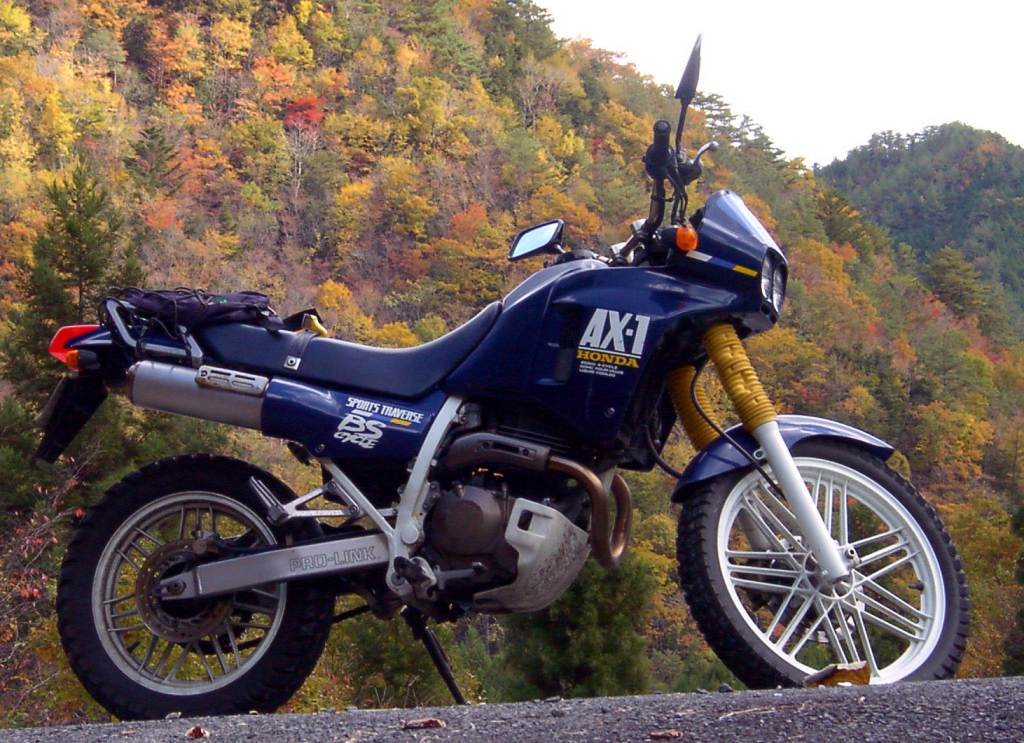
- Honda AX-1
- Manufacturer: Honda
- Also called: Honda NX250 Dominator
- Production: 1988-1990
- Class: Dual-sport
- Engine: MD21E. 249 cc (15.2 cu in), liquid-cooled, four-stroke, DOHC, single-cylinder
- Bore / stroke: 70 mm × 64.8 mm (2.76 in × 2.55 in), 4-valves
- Compression ratio: 11.0:1
- Power: 21.39 kW (28.68 hp) @ 8500 rpm
- Transmission: 6-speed chain drive manual
- Frame type: Tubular steel double cradle
- Suspension: Front: Telescopic; Rear: Swingarm
- Brakes: Front: Disc; Rear: Drum Brake/Expanding brake AX-1: Disc
- Tires: Front: 19 in (480 mm); Rear: 16 in (410 mm)
- Wheelbase: 1,350 mm (53 in)
- Dimensions: L: 2,040 mm (80 in); W: 805 mm (31.7 in); H: 1,115 mm (43.9 in)
- Seat height: 810 mm (32 in)
- Weight: 118 kg (260 lb) (dry); 133 kg (293 lb) (wet)
- Fuel capacity: 9 L (2.0 imp gal; 2.4 US gal); Adv: 33 L (7.3 imp gal; 8.7 US gal)
- Oil capacity: 1.6 L (0.35 imp gal; 0.42 US gal)
- Related: Honda NX650 Dominator

The Honda NX250 is a crossover dual-sport motorcycle produced by Honda, available in the United States from 1988 through 1990. It is a lightweight bike intended for both on-road and off-road riding. The NX250 featured the new MD21E engine which is a liquid-cooled, 249 cc, single-cylinder, four-valve, DOHC, four-stroke with an electric start. It has a bore and stroke of 70.0 mm × 64.8 mm (2.76 in × 2.55 in), 11 to 1 compression ratio, and a six-speed transmission. The suspension has 37 mm (1.5 in) forks with 8.7 inches travel up front, and Pro-Link with 7.9" in the rear. The NX250 has a 1,350 mm (53 in) wheelbase and a dry weight of 118 kg (260 lb). The seat height is 820 mm (32 in). In some countries Honda continued production of the NX250 up to 1993, where it was named Honda NX250 Dominator.

== AX-1 ==
The Honda AX-1 is a modified version of Honda NX250 intended only for the Japanese market but was offered in Oceania. Using the same chassis as the NX250, the AX-1 came standard with alloy rims, aluminum Pro-Link rear suspension this time with a rear disc brake, dual round headlights, taller cams, stainless steel exhaust and different carburetor settings. The valve clearance check interval is every 24,000 miles (39,000 km).

Spares commonality with NX250 is high, but certain parts are rare, such as the rear luggage rack, exhaust heat shield, cylinder heads and valve guides and headlights. However, the MD21E engine is known to run to over 100,000km without major overhaul. Part of this is due to an extremely durable Nikasil-coated cylinder bore. Nikasil is a chemically deposited layer of silicon carbide, which is typically twice as hard (on the Mohs scale) as iron/steel liners. The rear cush drive rubbers are not available and owners have made their own by modifying Honda Civic suspension bushes of similar dimensions, although they rarely fail during the life of the vehicle.

There is a small but dedicated online community for the NX250 and AX-1. With the rise of popularity of adventure bikes, there is renewed interest in the Honda AX-1 primarily for its light weight and power exceeding modern contemporaries such as the Honda CRF250L.
