= Honda XR600 =

Motorcycle

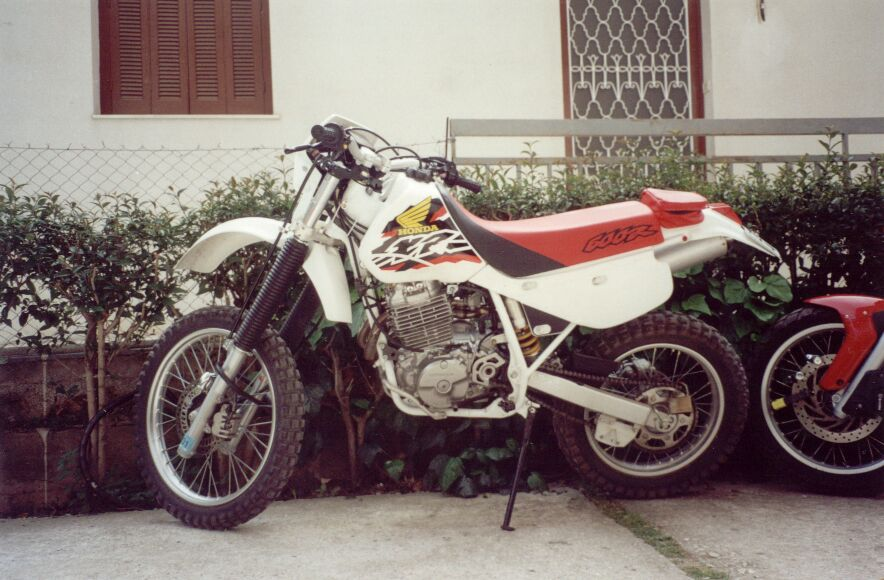
Honda XR600 2000 model

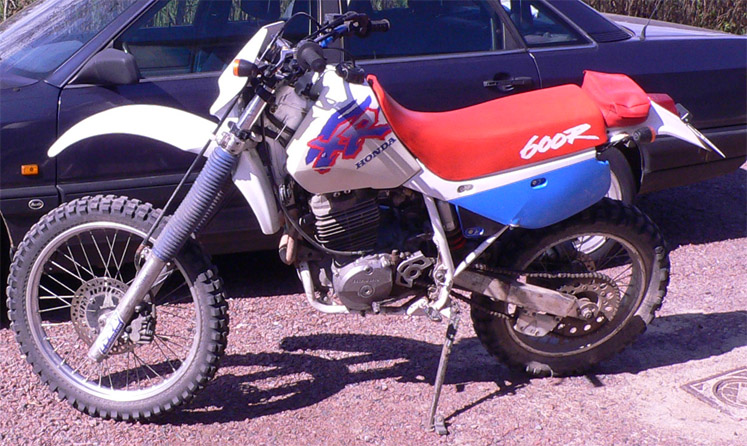
A 1993 Honda XR600R

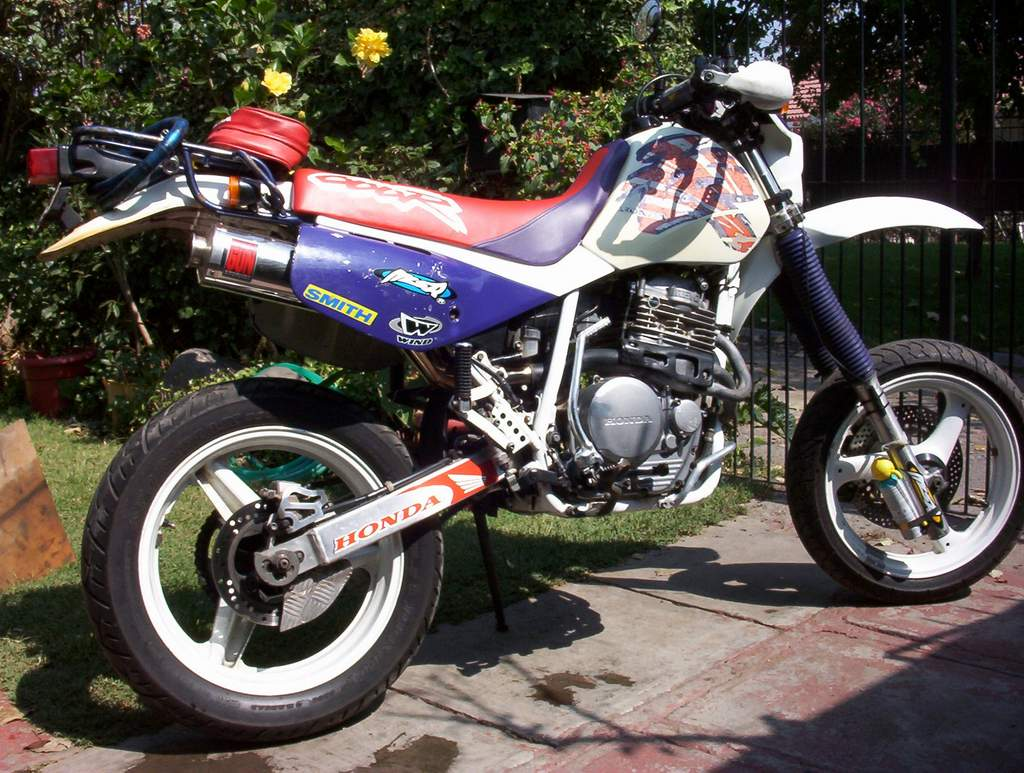
A 1995 Road modified XR600R

The Honda XR600R was an offroad dual-sport motorcycle powered by an air-cooled single cylinder, four-stroke engine, manufactured by Honda from 1985 to 2000, and is part of the Honda XR series. The currently available road oriented XR650L model is similar to the XR600R with an engine of more displacement but lower compression and less horsepower.

The engine displacement is 591 cc with four valves placed in a RFVC (Radial Four Valve Combustion) radial disposition with a single camshaft. It has a dry sump lubrication system. The engine has a compression of 9.0:1 with a bore/stroke of 97 × 80 mm. The engine is fed by a 39 mm piston-valve carburetor. The front suspension is managed by two conventional cartridge valve 43 mm forks with compression and rebound adjustability, and in the rear is a Prolink single shock with preload, compression and rebound adjustability. The bike has a five-speed transmission and a kickstarter.

== General specifications for the Honda XR600R ==
Specifications for 1992 model and on, unless noted
Engine Type	Single cylinder, air-cooled, four-stroke, SOHC, 4 valves
Carburetion	Keihin PD8-AF, Ø39 mm (85-87 featured dual 28mm carbs)
Displacement	591 cc
Bore × Stroke	97.0 mm × 80.0 mm (3.82 in × 3.15 in)
Fuel Capacity	2.6 US gallons, plus 0.8 gal reserve
Oil Capacity	2.3 L (2.4 US quarts)
Wheelbase	1455 mm (57.3 in)
Overall length	2160 mm (85.0 in)
Overall width	900 mm (35.5 in.)
Overall height	1215 mm (47.8 in)
Seat Height	955 mm (31 to 37 1/2 in) depending on year and model
Ground clearance	345 mm (13.6 in)
Tires	Front: 21 in 80/100; Rear: 18 in 110/100 ('85-'87 had 17" rear wheels)
Brakes	Front: 1 disc, dual-piston pin-slider caliper; Rear: Drum-linkage 85-91/1 disc, single-piston pin-slider caliper 92 up.
Weight	121 kg (267 lb)
