= Honda CL400 =

The Honda CL400 is a motorcycle launched by Honda on September 23, 1998.

The motorcycle has a single-cylinder air-cooled 387cc engine (the NC38, also found in the XR400R).

Information on the motorcycle in the English language is limited, including workshop manuals and other such material. It is, however, very similar to the XR400R. The specification of the motorcycle can be found at the Honda Worldwide News Site
