= Honda XR650L =

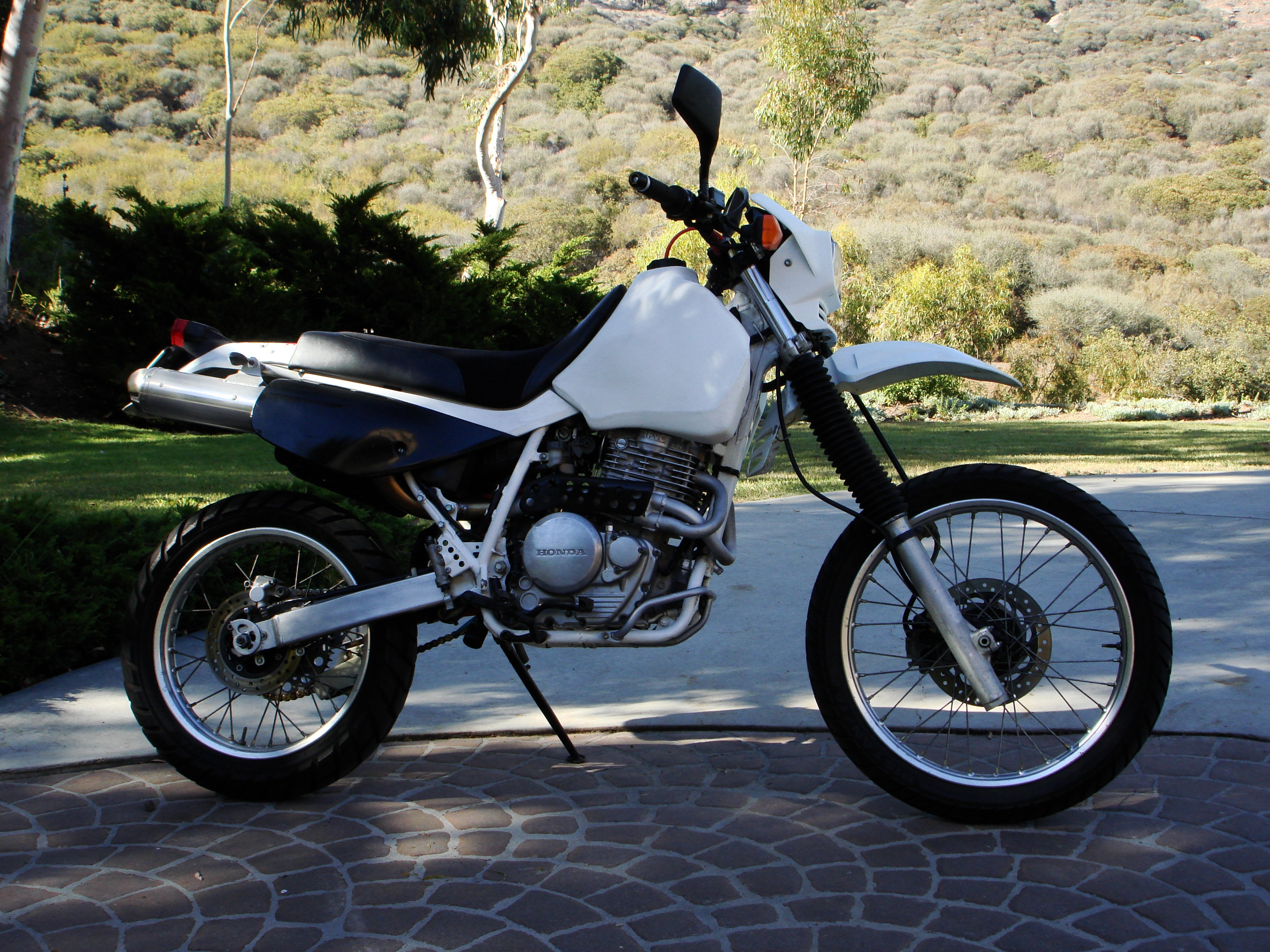
- 1993 XR650L
- Manufacturer: Honda
- Production: 1993-present
- Assembly: Japan
- Class: Dual sport
- Engine: Air-cooled 644 cc (39.3 cu in) SOHC dry-sump single-cylinder 4-stroke
- Bore / stroke: 100.0mm x 82.0mm
- Compression ratio: 8.3:1
- Ignition type: Electric starter
- Transmission: Five-speed
- Suspension: Front: 43mm air-adjustable leading-axle Showa cartridge fork with 16-position compression-damping adjustability; 11.6-inches of travel Rear: Pro-link Showa single-shock with spring-preload, 20-position compression- and 20-position rebound-damping adjustability; 11.0-inches travel
- Brakes: Front: Single disc with twin-piston caliper Rear: Single disc
- Tires: Front: 3.00-21; Rear: 4.60-18
- Rake, trail: Rake- 27.0 degrees Trail- 102.0mm (4.0 inches)
- Wheelbase: 57.3 inches (145.5 cm)
- Seat height: 37 in (940 mm)
- Weight: 349 lb (158 kg) (wet)
- Fuel capacity: 2.8 US gal (11 L; 2.3 imp gal)
- Oil capacity: 1.9 L
- Fuel consumption: 47.7 mpg_{‑US} (4.93 L/100 km; 57.3 mpg_{‑imp})

The XR650L is a dual-sport motorcycle manufactured by Honda, part of the Honda XR series. It was released in 1992 as a 1993 model. It combines the RFVC engine from the proven NX650 Dominator dual sport with the lighter, off-road capable XR600R chassis, the latter of which is not road legal in the US. It has been produced virtually unchanged since 1993 and is still in production as of 2027.

The engine is a 40 hp, air-cooled 644 cc (39.3 cu in) SOHC, dry-sump, single-cylinder, four-stroke. With an electric starter, headlight, taillight, turn signals, mirrors, US EPA and California Air Resources Board (CARB) compliant exhaust system, and a 2.8-US-gallon (11-litre; 2.3-imperial-gallon) metallic fuel tank, the 650L has a 349 lb (158 kg) wet weight. The seat height is 37 inches (940 mm).
