= Honda XR250R and XR250L =

Honda XR250R/XR250L
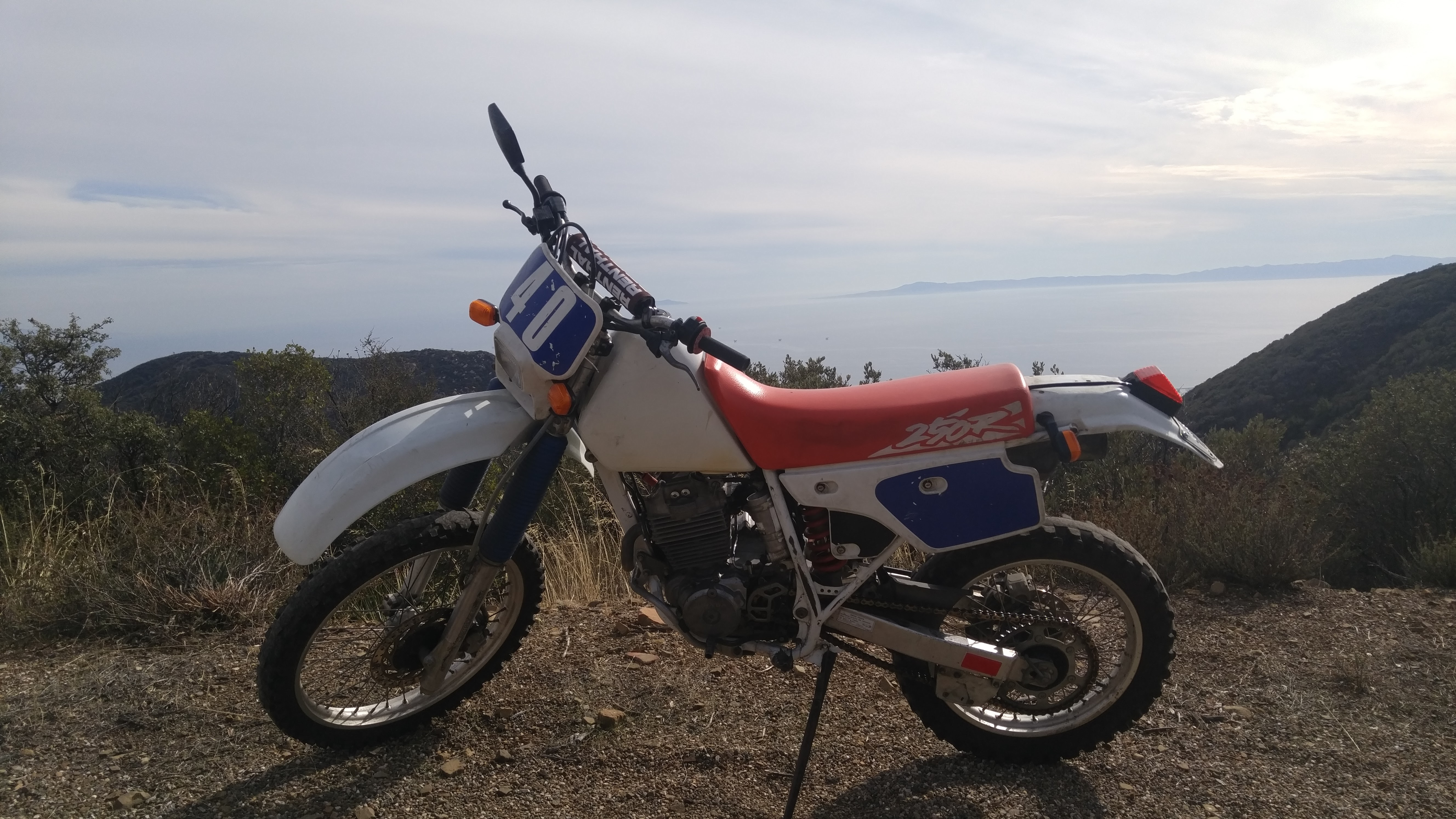
- A 1994 Honda XR250R
- Manufacturer: Honda
- Production: 1979–2004
- Predecessor: Honda XL250
- Successor: Honda CRF250F
- Class: Off road and dual-sport
- Engine: SOHC, 4-valve, oil-cooled, four-stroke, single
- Bore / stroke: (84-85) 75 mm × 56.5 mm (2.95 in × 2.22 in) (86–95) 73 mm × 59.5 mm (2.87 in × 2.34 in)
- Compression ratio: (84-85) 10.2:1 (86–95) 10.2:1
- Power: (84-85) 30 hp (22 kW)@ 8,500 rpm (claimed) (86–95) 24.56 hp (18.31 kW)@ 8,000 rpm (claimed)
- Torque: (84-85)17.7 lb⋅ft (24.0 N⋅m)@7,000 rpm (claimed) (86–95)16.85 lb⋅ft (22.85 N⋅m)@7,000 rpm (claimed)
- Transmission: 6-speed manual chain drive
- Frame type: Steel
- Suspension: Front: (84-85) 37mm damper rod forks with 10 in (250 mm) of travel (86-89) 41mm damper rod forks with 11 in (280 mm) of travel. Has base valve compression clicker. Cartridge emulator ready. (90–95) 41mm cartridge forks with 11 in (280 mm) of travel. Has no clickers. Not cartridge emulator ready. (96-04) 41mm cartridge forks with 10.6 in (270 mm) of travel with base valve compression clicker Rear: (84-85) Monoshock with 9.6 in (240 mm) of travel (86-95) KYB 40mm Mono Shock with 11 in (280 mm) of travel (96–04) KYB 44mm Mono Shock with 10.6 in (270 mm) of travel. Uses knobless clickers. Piggyback reservoir.
- Brakes: Front: 240mm disc Rear: (79–89) drum (90–04) 220mm disc
- Tires: Front: 80/100-21 Rear: 100/100-18
- Rake, trail: (85–95) 25°, 100 mm (3.9 in) (96–04) 24°, 92 mm (3.6 in)
- Wheelbase: (86–91) 1,420 mm (56.1 in); (91–95) 1,410 mm (55.7 in); (96–04) 55.1 in (1,400 mm)
- Dimensions: L: (86–91) 2,100 mm (82.7 in); (91–95) 2,110 mm (83.1 in); W: (86–91) 910 mm (35.8 in); (91–95) 900 mm (35.4 in); H: (86–91) 1,230 mm (48.3 in); (91–95) 1,200 mm (48 in)
- Seat height: (86–95) 920 mm (36.4 in); (96–04) 910 mm (36 in)
- Weight: (86–91) 108.6 kg (239.4 lb) (claimed); (91–95) 108.0 kg (238.1 lb) (claimed); (96–04) 110 kg (240 lb) (claimed); (dry); 260lbs (wet)
- Fuel capacity: (86–95) 9.0 L; 1.98 imp gal (2.38 US gal) 2.6 US gal (9.8 L; 2.2 imp gal)
- Oil capacity: (86–95) 1,600 ml (1.7 US qt)

The Honda XR250R and XR250L are trail and dual-sport motorcycles made by Honda from 1979 through 2004, as part of the Honda XR series. They have four-stroke, SOHC four-valve 249 cc (15.2 cu in) single-cylinder engines.

In 1981, the XR250 was updated with a single rear shock. In 1984, the bike was introduced with Honda's Radial Four Valve Combustion Chamber (RFVC). It has a 110 kg (240 lb) claimed dry weight, and a 36-inch seat height (96–04). Honda claims the engine produces 28 horsepower at 8000 rpm and 17 ft-lb feet of torque. The 1996–2004 versions of the XR250R had 10.6 inches of suspension travel front and rear and 41mm front cartridge forks. The tire size was 80/100-21 front and 100/100-18 rear. It had 13–48 tooth gearing and a stock top speed of around 76 mph at 8000 rpm. The XR250L was a heavier, street-legal version which was introduced in 1991 and should not be confused with the older XL250R. Starting in 1981, the XR250 had a 21-inch front wheel. 1979 and 1980 versions had a 23-inch front wheel (3.00 x 23 tire size).

Unlike the CRF230F, which effectively replaced the XR200R in Honda's lineup as an air-cooled off-road motorcycle, the XR250R has no air cooled successor until the CRF250F in 2019. That said, the ‘F’ shares little more with the XR than it being a great starter play bike, 4 valve head, and an air cooled low maintenance bike. They are a different thing altogether with the ‘F’ meaning fuel injected, with the suspension limited to 9.8” of travel, seat height lower by 2”, electric start, and a 5-speed transmission. The ‘F’ in stock form is a far more modern engine. The ‘R’ power plant feels dated and is lower performing in comparison, despite higher output power.

The engines in both the XR250R and XR250L are identical. In the United States the L has a 3 mm smaller header pipe and a different carburetor to satisfy emissions regulations, though both carburetors have a 30 mm bore. The engine has a four-valve head with splayed rocker arms to actuate the valves. Unusual for a single-cylinder engine, it has a two-into-one header pipe. Throughout its production, the R version is kickstart only, has a six-speed transmission with chain final drive, and has stator ignition. For the pre-1996 models, the suspension travel was 280 mm (11 in) front and rear. The XR250R is the enduro (competition) model; however, the L version is electric start, (except for the USA market XR250L, which never had electric start and which was discontinued after the 1996 model year), with pillion pegs, softer suspension and lower seat height. The changes between 1996 and 2004 consisted of decal updates, the mechanical parts being identical. The XR250R was discontinued after 2004. In Australia a XR250Y was released with upside-down forks and electric start in 05–06.

The 1991 Honda XR250L is the most sold of the entire XR series with more than 814,000 units being sold.

1981	Single rear shock
1984	Radial Four-Valve Combustion Chamber (RFVC). 75mm bore × 56.5mm stroke Dual 21mm Carburators.
1986	Single carburetor. Engine saw a smaller bore & longer stroke. 73mm bore × 59.5mm stroke. Oil Cooler added to ‘R’ only.
1990	Rear disc brake and clickerless cartridge forks
1996	Revised suspension with 10.6 in (270 mm) of travel and a steeper steering angle. Front forks with more ground clearance and compression clickers. Rear Shock increased to 44mm with piggyback reservoir from 40mm hosed. Updated dry-sump engine with lighter flywheel and counterweights. New engine mounts, exhaust valves, decompression at CAM, and swingarm pivot through engine case. Removable rear subframe with hinged airbox door. Lighter and less plush seat. Longer Aluminum kickstart lever. Revised larger footpegs. Reduced frame guard to match oil in frame. Increased steering stem height compatible with the XR400.
