= Honda XR100R =

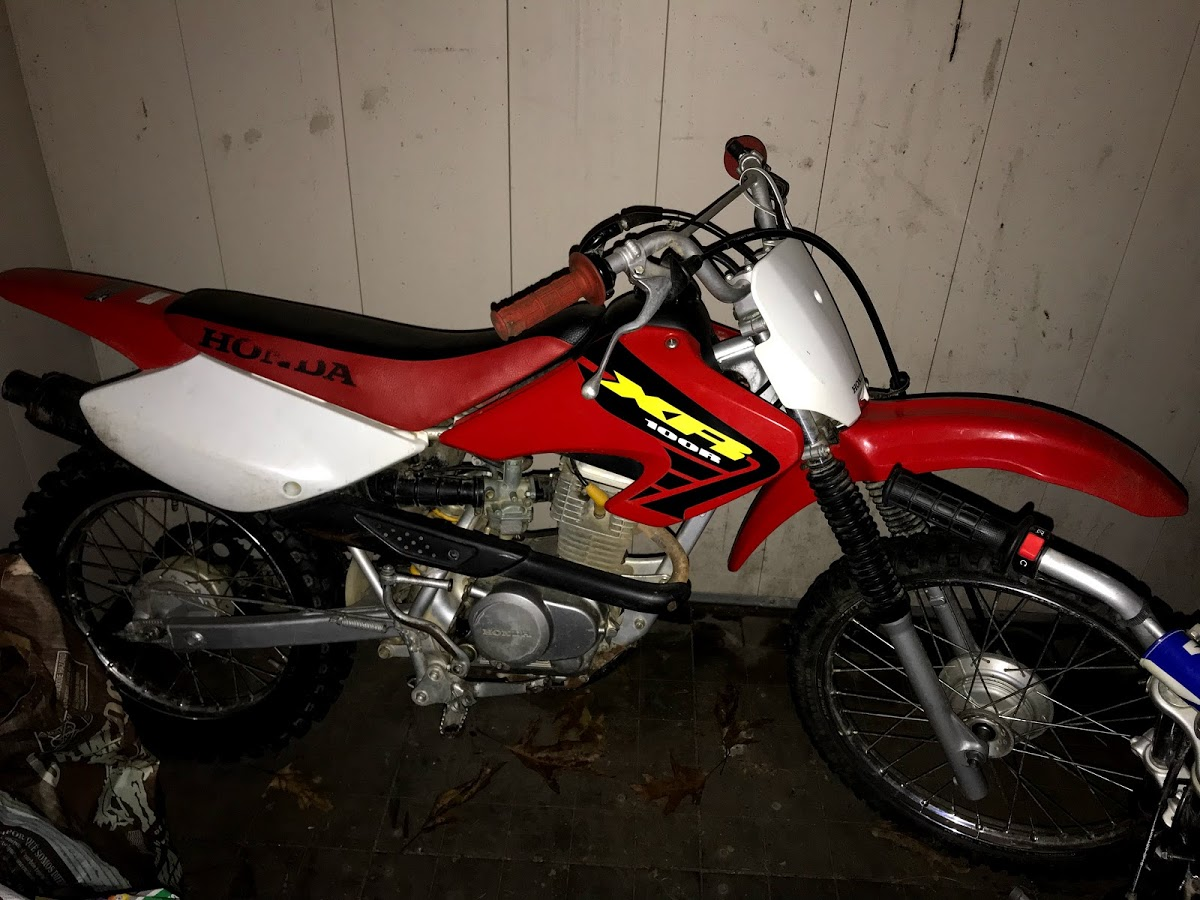
- A 2001 Honda XR100R
- Manufacturer: Honda
- Production: 1985–2005
- Successor: Honda CRF100
- Class: Off road
- Engine: 99 cc (6.0 cu in) SOHC, 2-valve, oil-cooled, four-stroke, Single-cylinder

The Honda XR100R is a four-stroke off-road motorcycle introduced in 1985, four years after the introduction of the XR100. It has become popular for learning riders. It was changed little over its two decade production run.

== Mechanical details ==
=== Engine ===
This bike was built to handle both racing and harsh terrain riding. The engine was a 99 cc (6.0 cu in) single cylinder air-cooled system. The compression ratio was 9.4:1 and the bore and stroke were 2.1 inches by 1.8 inches. The whole configuration adds up to about a 10 hp output. This gave the bike a friendly power curve but also plenty of torque and power for the beginner or smaller sized rider.

=== Aesthetics ===
Debuting in orange in 1985, the color of the XR100 changed over the years as following; 1987 white front and rear fenders, and other subtle color changes followed and years to come. Since the bike debuted, the most notable difference between it and the standard XR100 is the use of the single coil-over adjustable Honda Pro-Link swing-arm suspension system instead of the older twin single coil-over shocks. The gas tank shifted from metal to plastic, design of the plastics changed slightly over the years.

== Racing heritage ==
With its high-revving motor, the XR100 became a favorite for motor swaps into various two-stroke mini bikes, such as the YZ80 and KX80 in the 1980s, and later the CR85 in the 1990s and 2000s. They began to have a cult-like following with race clubs such as SoCal XRs.
