= Honda XR series =

Honda off-road motorcycles

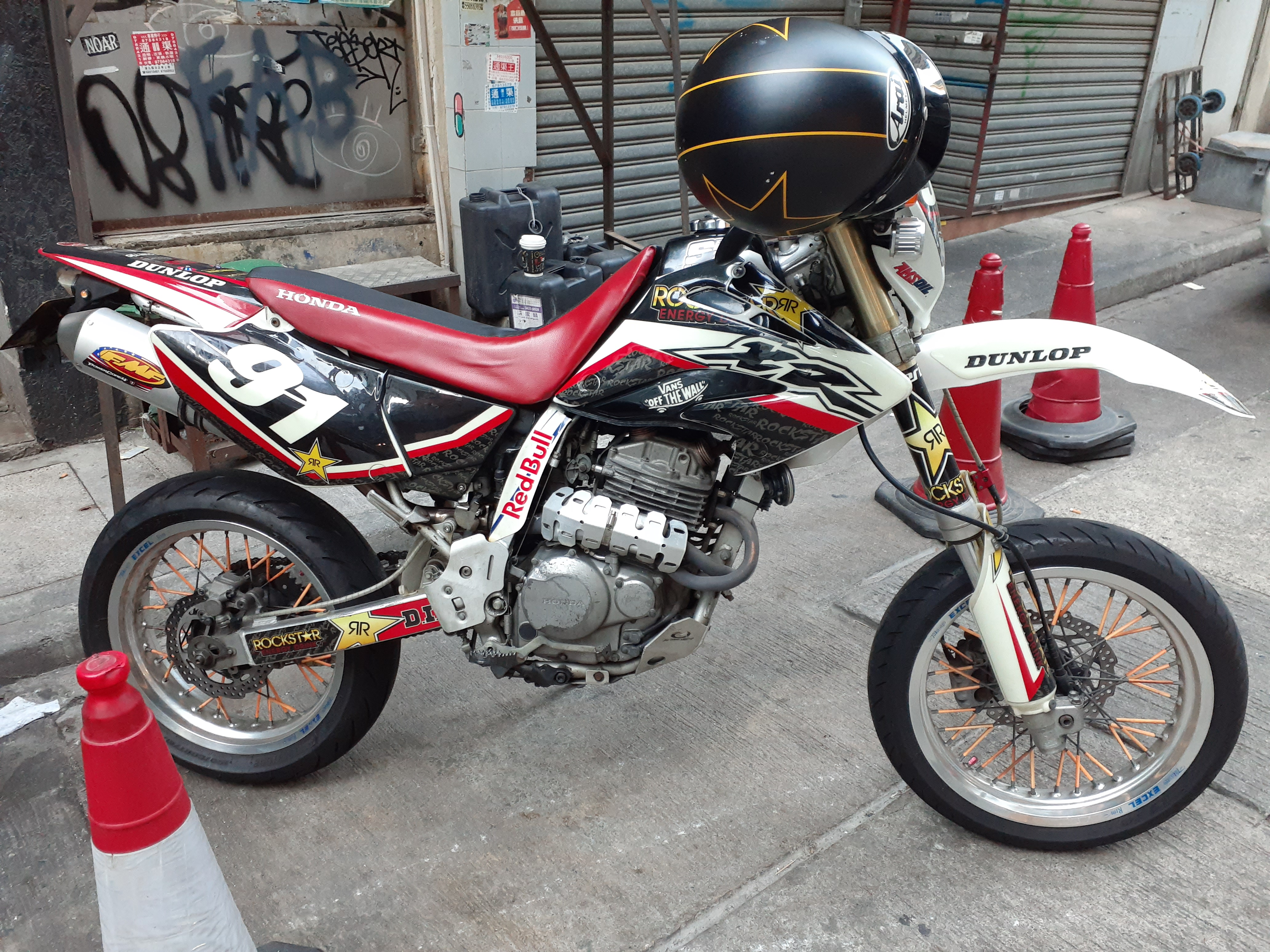
Honda XR Supermoto

The Honda XR series is a range of four-stroke off-road motorcycles that were designed in Japan but assembled all over the world.

Some of the XR series came in two versions: R and L. The R version bikes were enduro machines designed for off-road competitive riding. They were fitted with knobby off-road tires and were not always street legal. The L version models were dual-sport trailbikes, fitted with lights, indicators, horn, and street-legal tires.

== Small XR models ==
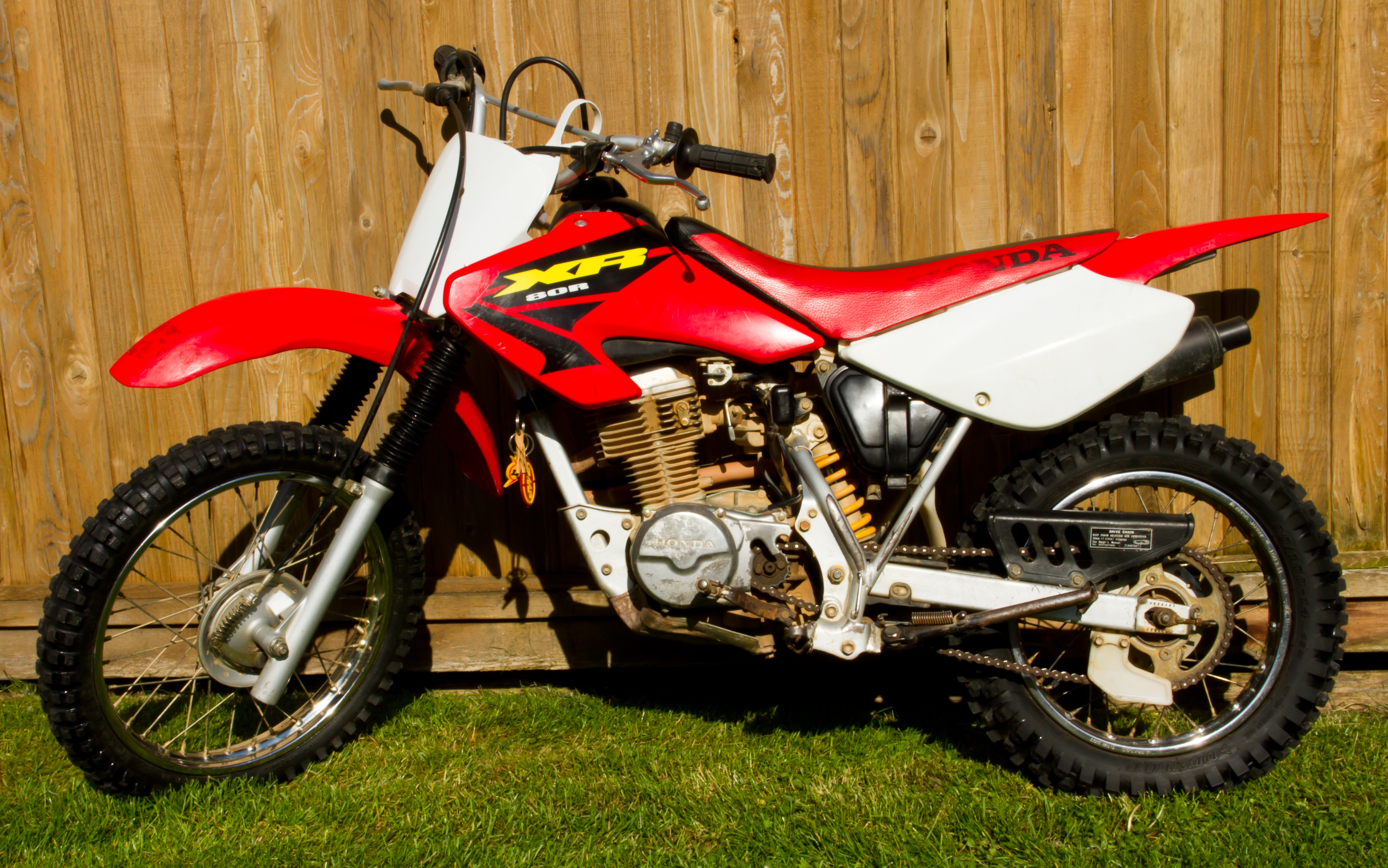
XR80

Small XR models include the XR50R, XR70R, XR75R, XR80R and XR100R. They are much smaller in size in comparison to the other bikes in the series, and are designed for children, smaller riders, as pit bikes, or for fun.

The XR80R was used in the film Terminator 2: Judgment Day, ridden by a young John Connor (Edward Furlong). In some scenes the taller XR100R (VIN H2HE0309LK900900) is the motorcycle from those sequences was used as Furlong's stunt double was an adult man. The sound effects are that of a two-stroke engine for dramatic effect.

The XR50 is a small four-stroke 50 cc (3.1 cu in) child's entry level motorcycle, introduced in 1969 and still in production as the CRF50 in 2021. Originally it was called the Z-50, then Trail-50, the XR 50, CRF 50, and the mini dirt bike.

== XR100R ==
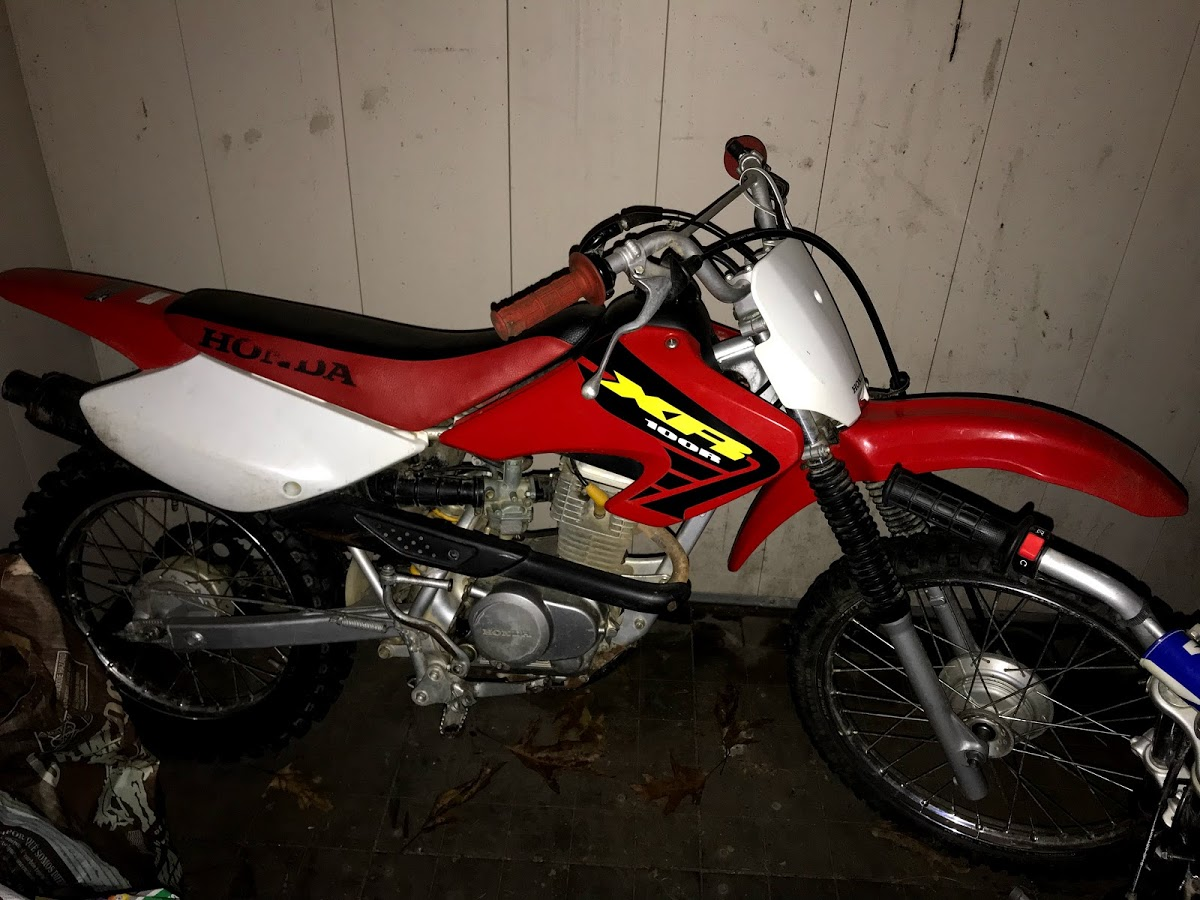
2001 Honda XR100R

The XR100R was first introduced with the R designation in 1985, four years after the XR100 was brought to market. A major difference between the two was a major rear suspension upgrade to a more race-like single coil-over design (monoshock) and a new swingarm over the traditional dual real coil-over systems on the XR100. This suspension system was known as the Pro-Link system on Hondas.

== XR125L ==
In some markets such as Western Europe, an XR125L was released in 2003 as a replacement to the XLR 125. The 124 cc (7.6 cu in) engine generates 11.52 hp (8.59 kW) at 4,500&;rpm, Only the 2010 XR125L has a kick starter. The XR 125L shares the same basic engine (JC30E) as the Honda CG125ES but with a few differences (the XR125L variant of the JC30E engine has larger diameter mounting holes in the engine casing, an engine mount on the cylinder head, and a longer counter shaft in the transmission to support wider rear wheels), and produces a maximum torque of 7 ft-lb, the top speed in real world conditions is between 55 and 60 mph (89 and 97 km/h) with a fuel consumption of about 60 mpg_{‑US} (3.9 L/100 km; 72 mpg_{‑imp}).

In Brazil, this model was named NXR 125 Bros.

== XR150L ==
The XR150L was released in 2014. The 150cc 4-stroke, single-cylinder, air-cooled, OHC engine generates 12.14 hp (9.05 kW) at 7,750&;rpm, Electric and kick starter. The XR150 produces maximum torque of 12.5Nm at 6000 rpm; the top speed in real world conditions is between 60 and 68 mph (97 and 109 km/h) with a fuel consumption of about 60 mpg_{‑US} (3.9 L/100 km; 72 mpg_{‑imp}). It has a 5-speed gearbox. It has 19 in (480 mm) front wheel and 17 in (430 mm) rear wheel. It has a 12-litre fuel tank and luggage rack as standard. In many countries it can be road-registered but not Australia. Curb weight is 130 kg. It has a front disc brake and rear drum brake. A more recent version is the 2023 XR150L released in early 2023 for $2971 new. It has a four stroke engine, long travel suspension, and an electric starter.

== XR190L ==
The XR190L was released in 2019. The 184.4 cc (11.25 cu in) engine 4-stroke, single-cylinder, air-cooled, OHC fuel-injected engine generates 15.6 hp (11.6 kW) at 8,500rpm, Electric and kick starter. The XR190L produces Max torque of 15.6Nm @ 6000 RPM, the top speed in real world conditions is between 65–72 mph (105–116 km/h) with a fuel consumption of about 60 mpg_{‑US} (3.9 L/100 km; 72 mpg_{‑imp}). Other than the larger engine capacity over the XR150L, the XR190L has Fuel Injection. It has a 5 speed gearbox. It has 21 inch front wheel and 18 inch rear wheel. It has a 12-litre fuel tank and luggage rack as standard. In many countries it can be road registered including Australia. Kerb weight is 137 kg. It has a front disc brake and rear drum brake. In some international markets, there is an agricultural version of the XR19L, rebadged to be a XR190AG aimed at farmers for Australia and New Zealand with additional racks and lowered gearing.

A derivative for South America, named XRE 190, has electric start only, and disc brakes featuring single-channel ABS on the front wheel.

== XR200 ==
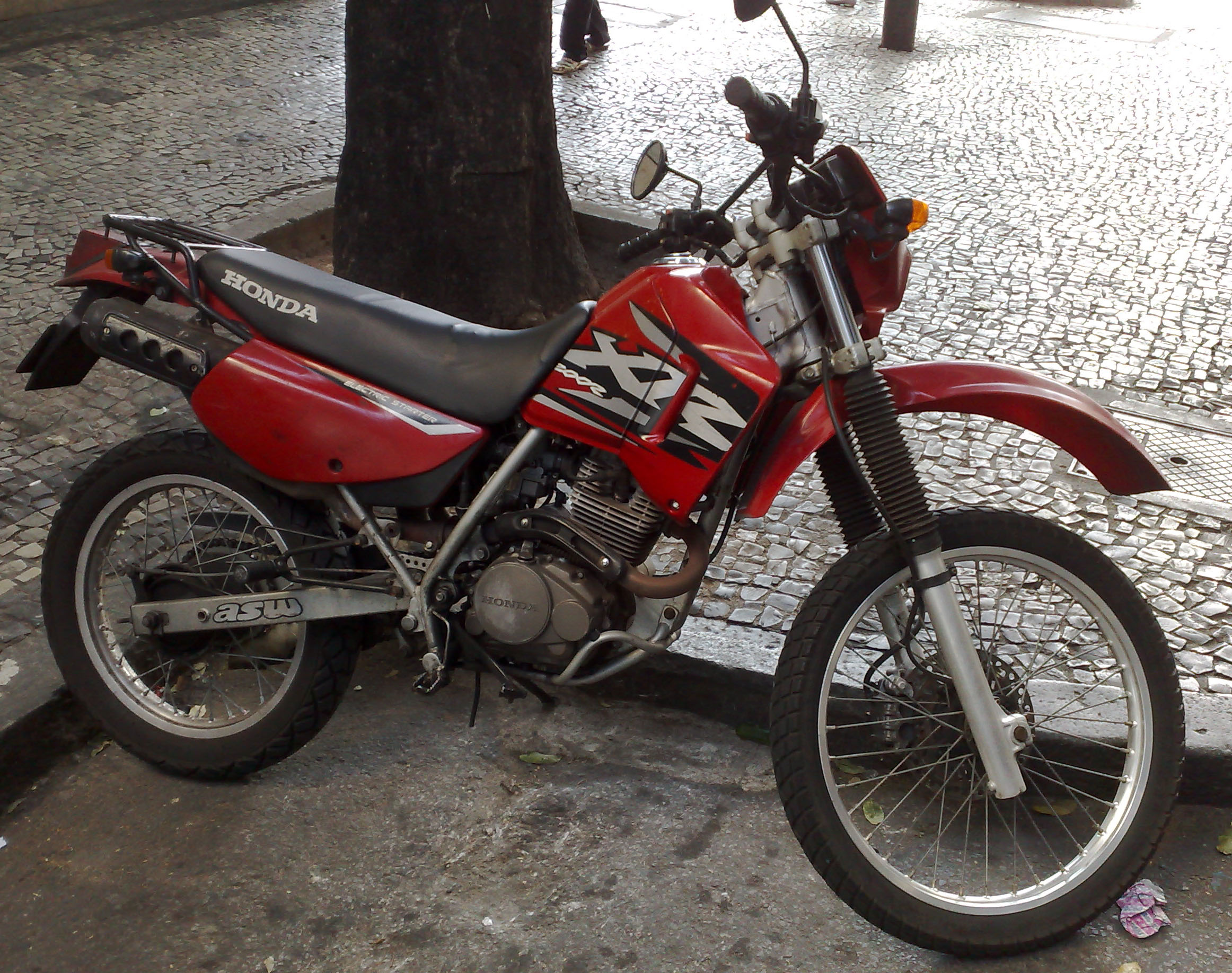
1984 XR200

The XR200, a development of the XL185 trail bike, was produced from 1980 until 1984. The XR200 had a modestly enlarged ohc 2-valve 6-speed air-cooled engine with kick-start only. Suspension was conventional (dual rear shocks), like the XL185s, but with better quality components and more travel. Although the XR200 power output was modest, the bike was small and light and it suited less experienced riders. Due to its lightness, easy handling and good ground clearance, the XR200 was competitive as a clubman's enduro machine. Drum brakes were fitted front and rear. Having neither battery nor electric start, the driving lights shone only when the engine was running. For the 1979 model year only, there was an XR185 sold in some markets.

=== XR200R ===
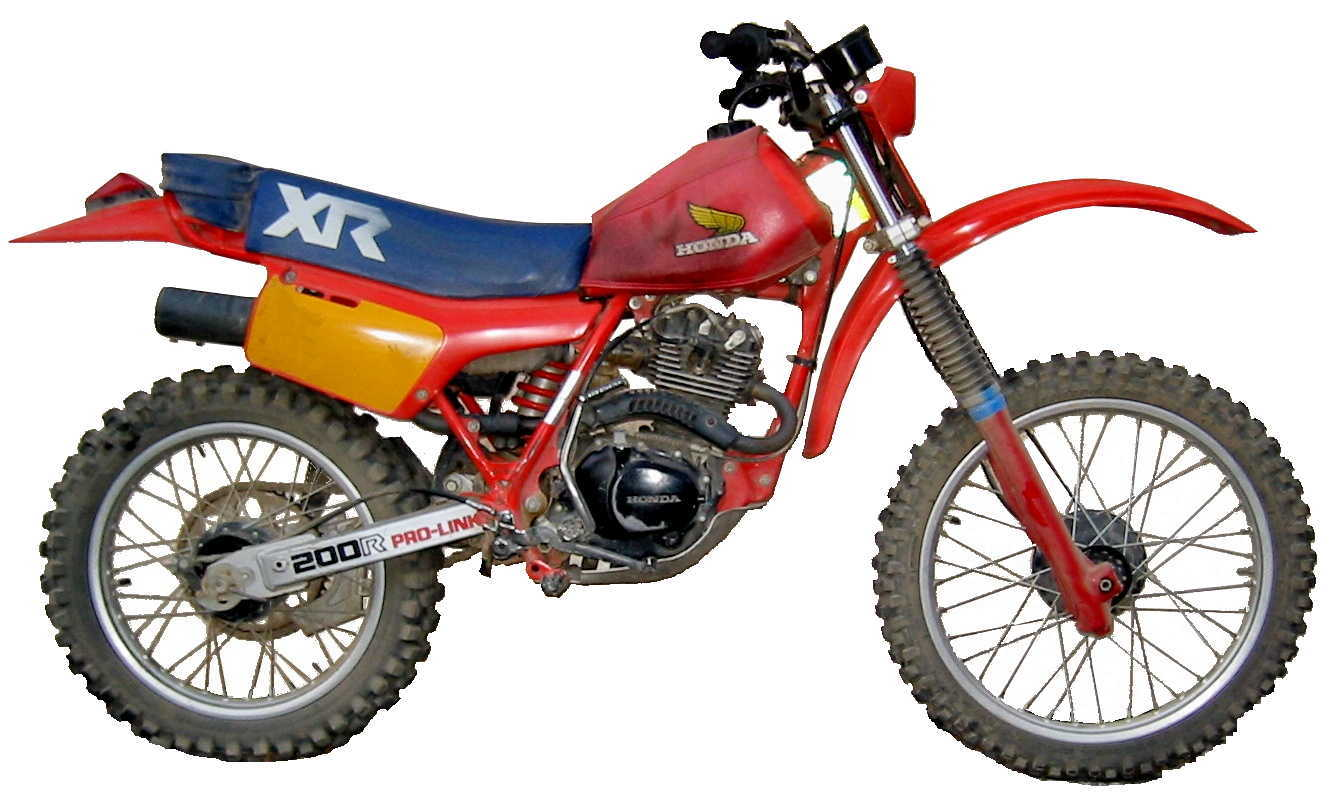
1983 Honda XR200R

Introduced in 1981 and produced together with the XR200 for a few years, the Honda XR 200R had the same 195 cc (11.9 cu in) engine of its predecessor, the XR200. This oversquare two-valve engine had a 10:1 compression ratio. A major advance over the XR200, the XR200R had Pro-Link rear suspension, and heavier duty frame and forks, and was a tougher enduro machine.

For the 1984-85 model years, the XR200R had a smaller version of the same 4 valve RFVC engine as the other XRs in the line up. The 200cc RFVC engine shared many parts with the 250cc RFVC engine. For the 1986 model year, Honda reverted to the 2 valve engine that had powered the XR200R before 1984 and variations of the 2 valve engine continued to power the XR200R until the model was dropped altogether. The 1991 model was the best performance wise.

Brazilian versions of the XR 200R were introduced in 1993/94 and remained on production until 2001 for the domestic market and at least until 2015 for export, always fitted with the 2-valve engine, electric start and front disc brake. At least in Australia, the Brazilian-made model was rebadged CTX200 and fitted with a "cheater sprocket" to get an overall lower gear ratio more suitable to the needs of agricultural operators and was not roadworthy as supplied.

== XR230R ==
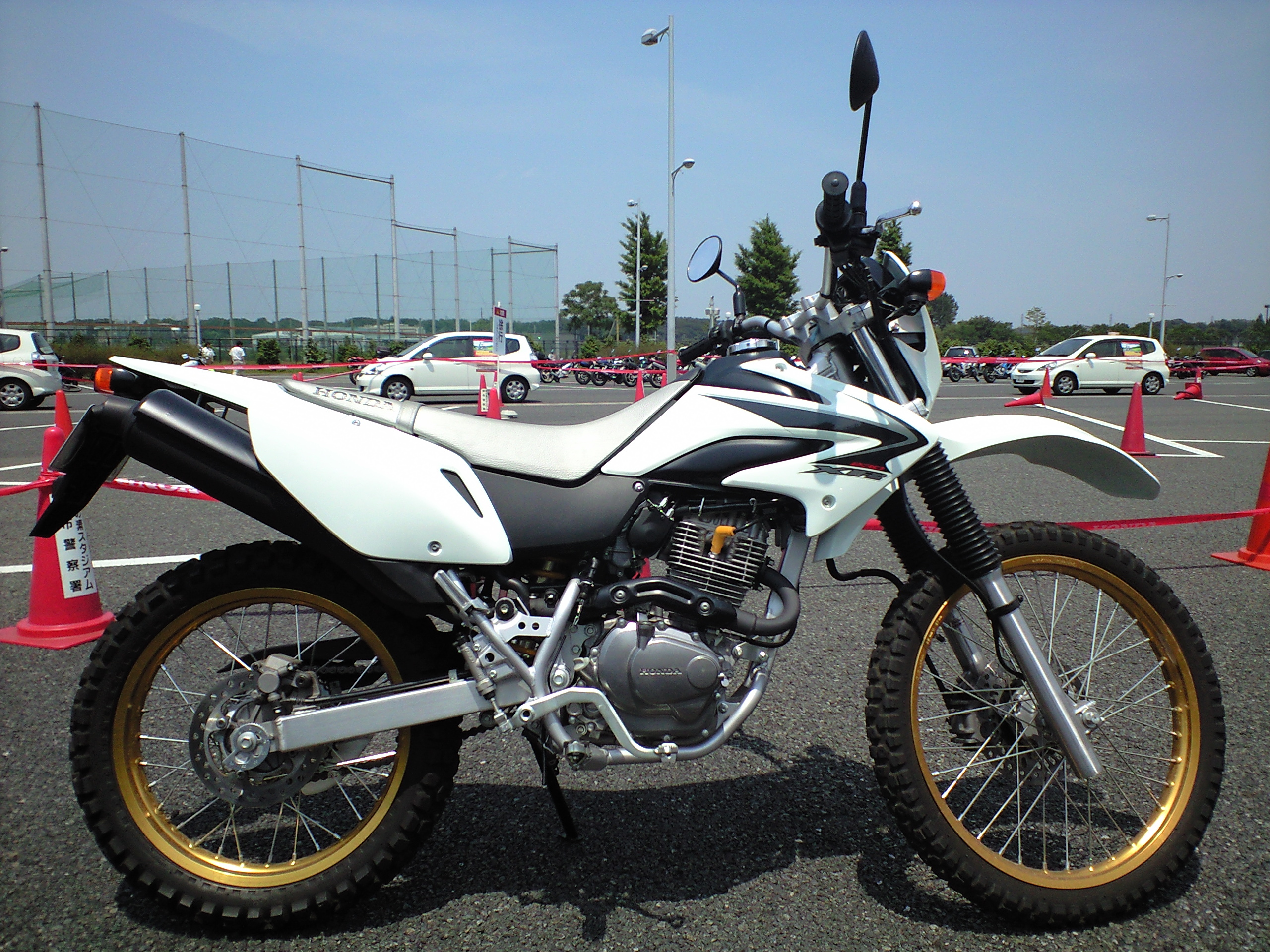
2008 Honda XR230R

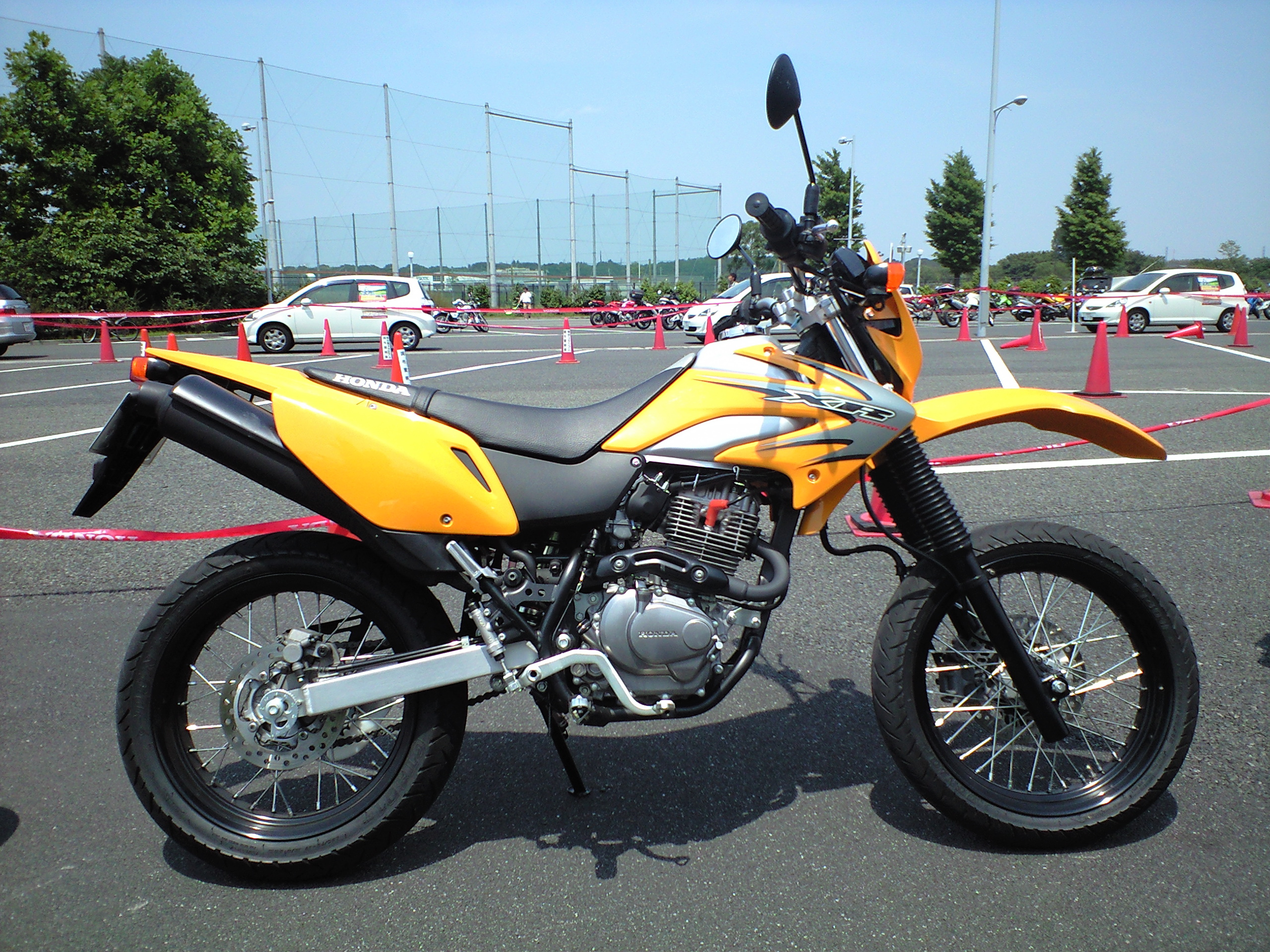
2008 Honda XR230R Supermoto

== XR250R ==
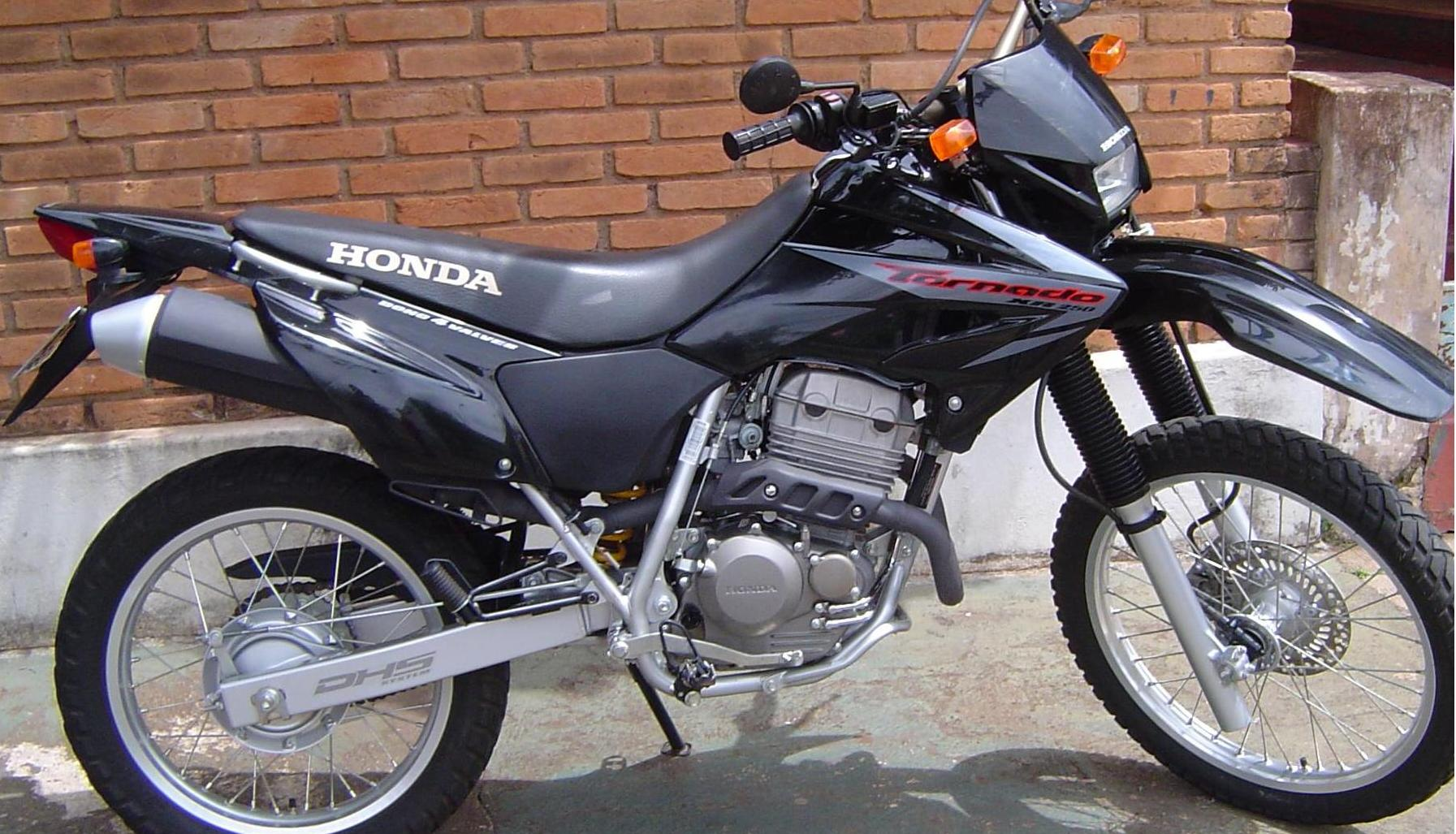
Honda XR250 Tornado

The XR250R was introduced pre 1981 and was originally equipped with a variation of the engine that had powered the XL250S since 1978. For 1983 the model was dropped from Honda's line-up, but came back in 1984 with a completely new engine dubbed the "Radial Four Valve Chamber" (RFVC) engine. The original 250 cc (15 cu in) RFVC engine had a bore and stroke of 75 mm × 56.5 mm (2.95 in × 2.22 in), but in 1986 this was changed to 73 mm × 59.5 mm (2.87 in × 2.34 in). 1986 also saw the adoption of a large, single carburetor rather than the dual progressively opening carburetors of the 84-85 models. In 1996 the engine of the XR 250R, the mainstay of the XR range, was updated and now produced 19 hp (14 kW) at 8100 rpm. Changes included a new crankcase with better engine mounts (which incorporated the swingarm pivot) for a stiffer chassis, smaller exhaust valves to address a problem with cracking cylinder heads, and an improved automatic decompressor for easier starting. Although the XR250R was always quite heavy compared to its 2 stroke competition and both front and rear suspension were rather basic, it proved reliable and likable and was successful as an entry-level off-road machine. The XR250R was discontinued after 2004.

=== US XR250L ===
This street version of the XR250R was built to conform to USA Department of Transportation regulations for street legal motorcycles, but was sold worldwide. It had road legal lights and tires, a steel fuel tank, keyed ignition/steering lock, a 12V battery and battery supported DC ignition system, lower seat height and other minor changes. Some 40 lb (18 kg) heavier, it had reduced off-road ability. It shared the XR250R's RFVC 249 cc (15.2 cu in) engine, but with a different carburetor and 3 mm (0.12 in) smaller exhaust headers to meet emissions requirements. It was manufactured from 1991 to 2007.

There was a Brazilian equivalent named XR 250 Tornado made from 2001 to 2009 (until 2012 for export) for the local market and regional exports to other South American countries but also available in Mexico and Central America. Its engine was the same 4-valve DOHC air-cooled single fitted to the CBX 250 Twister/CBF 250, but the exhaust was dimensioned to improve low-end torque with the sacrifice of 1 hp resulting in a 23 hp rating.

=== XR250 (MD30) / XR250L ===
An electric start street version of the XR250R was sold in Asia as the XR250 and Australia as the XR250L. The Honda model designator for it is MD30. It's based on the 1996-2004 model XR250R but with different suspension, fuel tank, rear subframe, electrical system, carburettor, cam shaft and most significantly the addition of electric start. There were two variants of the bike a single headlight version that looks more like the standard XR250R and a dual headlight "Baja" version.

== XR350R ==
The XR 350R was introduced for the 1983 model year and discontinued after the 1985 model year. The 1983 and 1984 models were wet sump engines with a bore and stroke of 84 mm × 61.3 mm (3.31 in × 2.41 in) and a displacement of 339 cc (20.7 cu in). The 1985 engine had a dry sump, (carrying the engine oil in a tank built into the frame, like the XR600R), a stroke of 63.8 mm and displacement of 353 cc (21.5 cu in). The wrist pin diameter was reduced from 21 mm to 19 mm and the dual progressive carburetors of the 83-84 models were replaced by a single large carburetor.

== XR400R ==
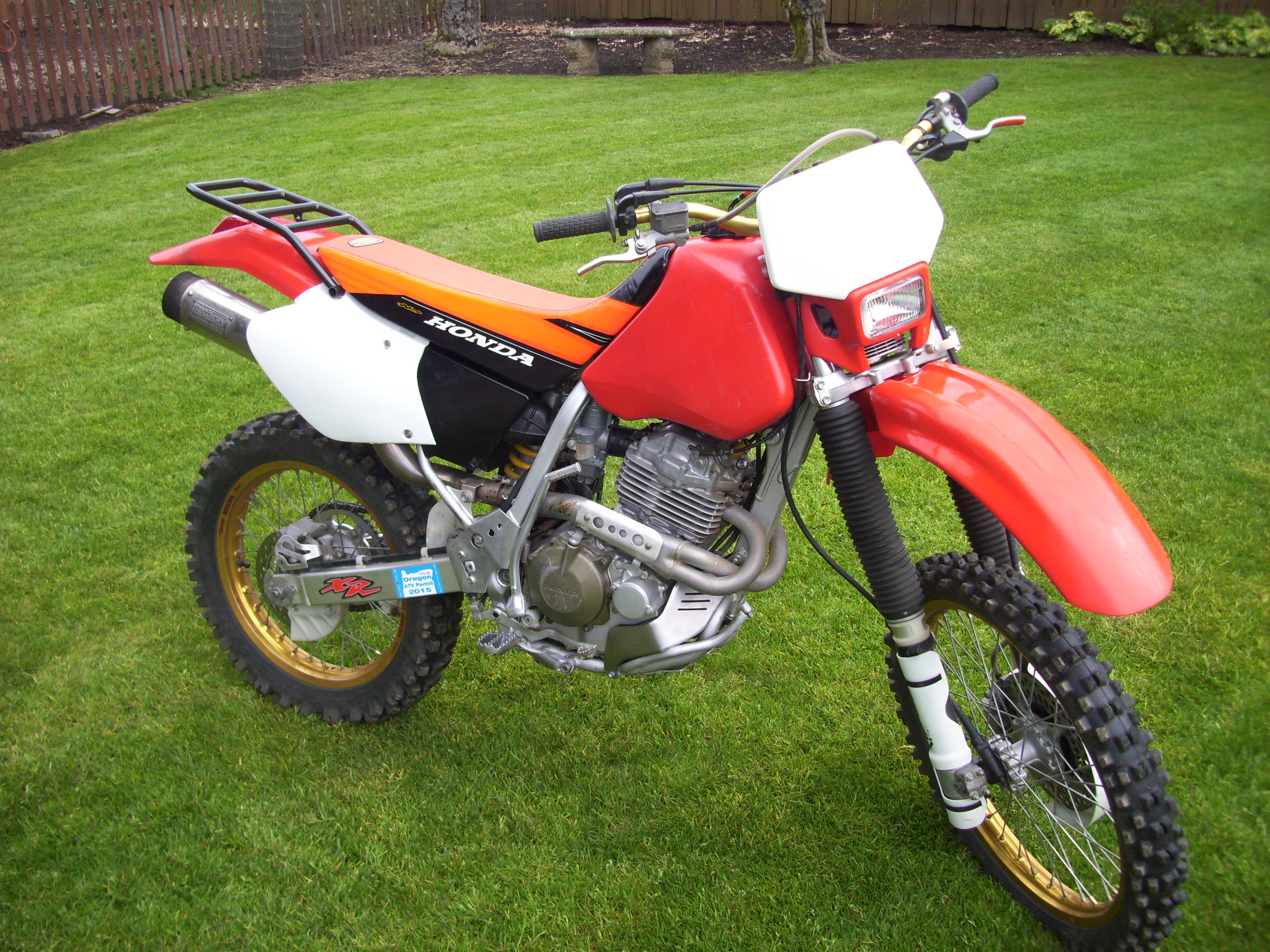
2000 XR400R with custom rack and aftermarket seat.

The XR 400R was introduced in 1996. Its frame, plastics and suspension components were similar to those of the XR250R, and it had a similar air-cooled engine with RFVC cylinder head technology. The XR400R had more suspension travel and a longer wheelbase than the XR250R of the same year. Many XR400Rs were heavily modified and raced. The 400 was perhaps the most versatile of the XR line-up; many were raced in amateur motocross and enduro events. Equipped with street-legal lighting it also worked reasonably well as a dual purpose bike. It was simple, reliable and long lasting. Hard to break and easy to fix. In 2004 Honda discontinued the XR400R.

=== XR400M ===
The XR 400M was introduced in 2005, and whilst having a similar engine to the XR 400R, the exhaust diameter is smaller and has a slightly lower power output. It was sold as a factory motard, with road wheels and tyres, electric start, and updated faux radiator fairings.

== XR500 / XR500R ==
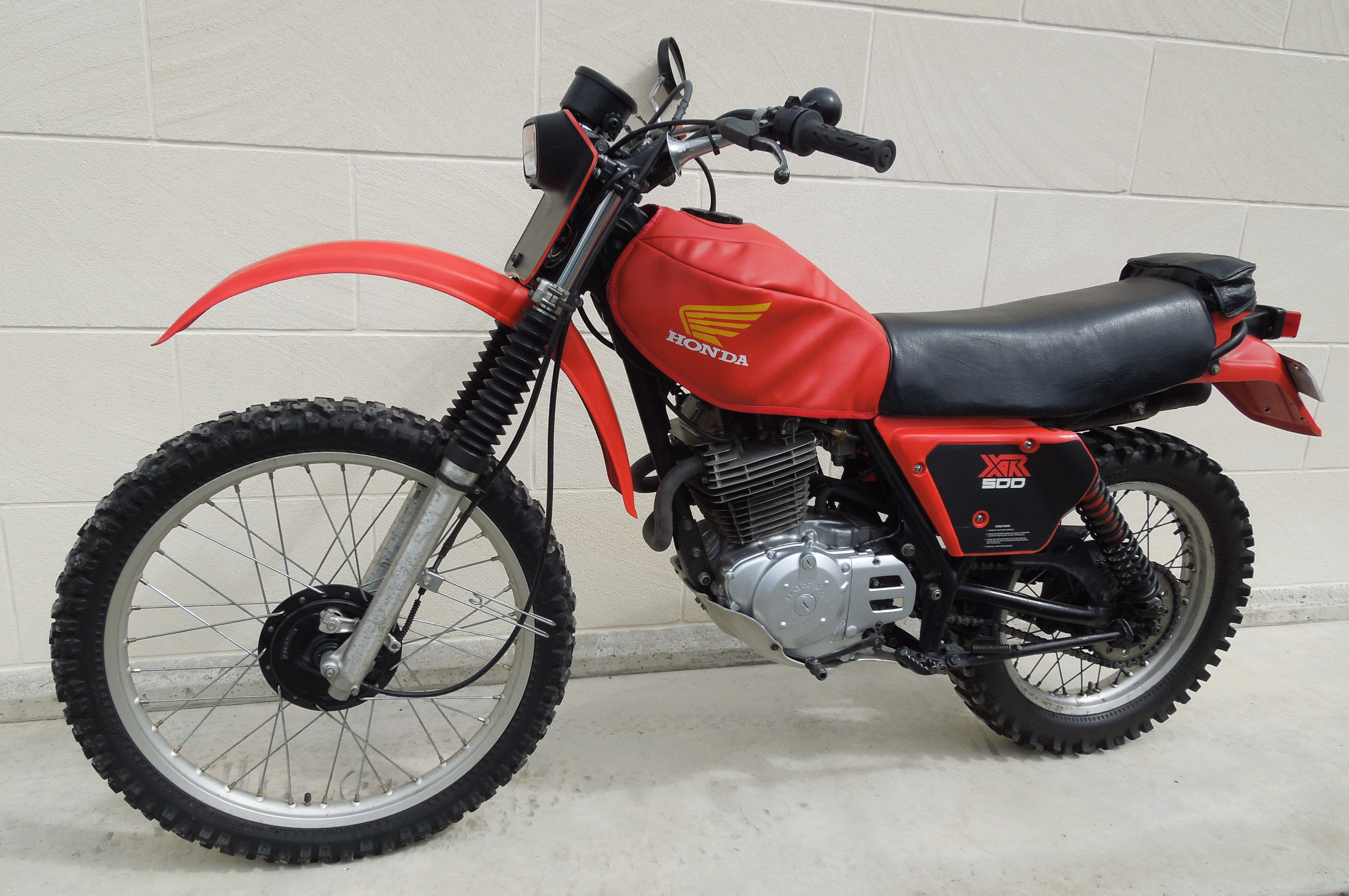
1980 Honda XR 500A

Introduced in 1979, the twin-shock Honda XR 500 was the first "XR" model. The engine was a four-stroke, four-valve OHC, 497 cc (30.3 cu in) "Pentroof" engine. The bike had a conventional 18" rear wheel but an unusual 23" front wheel which was supposed to be better for riding over potholes and ruts. The 23" size proved unpopular and did not catch on as the wheel/tyre assembly was heavy, and there was little choice of replacement 23" tyres.

In 1981 Honda introduced 'Pro-Link’ models, with rising-rate single-shock rear suspension, a 17" rear wheel and a 21" front wheel. Unusual for a four-stroke with its typical intake and exhaust valves, the 1981 and 1982 XR-500 utilized a six-petal reed valve set-up between the carburetor and the intake valves. This was intended to provide better low-end performance while still allowing a large carburetor to be used. The 1982 XR 500RC was very similar to the 1981 RB apart from decal and trim changes.

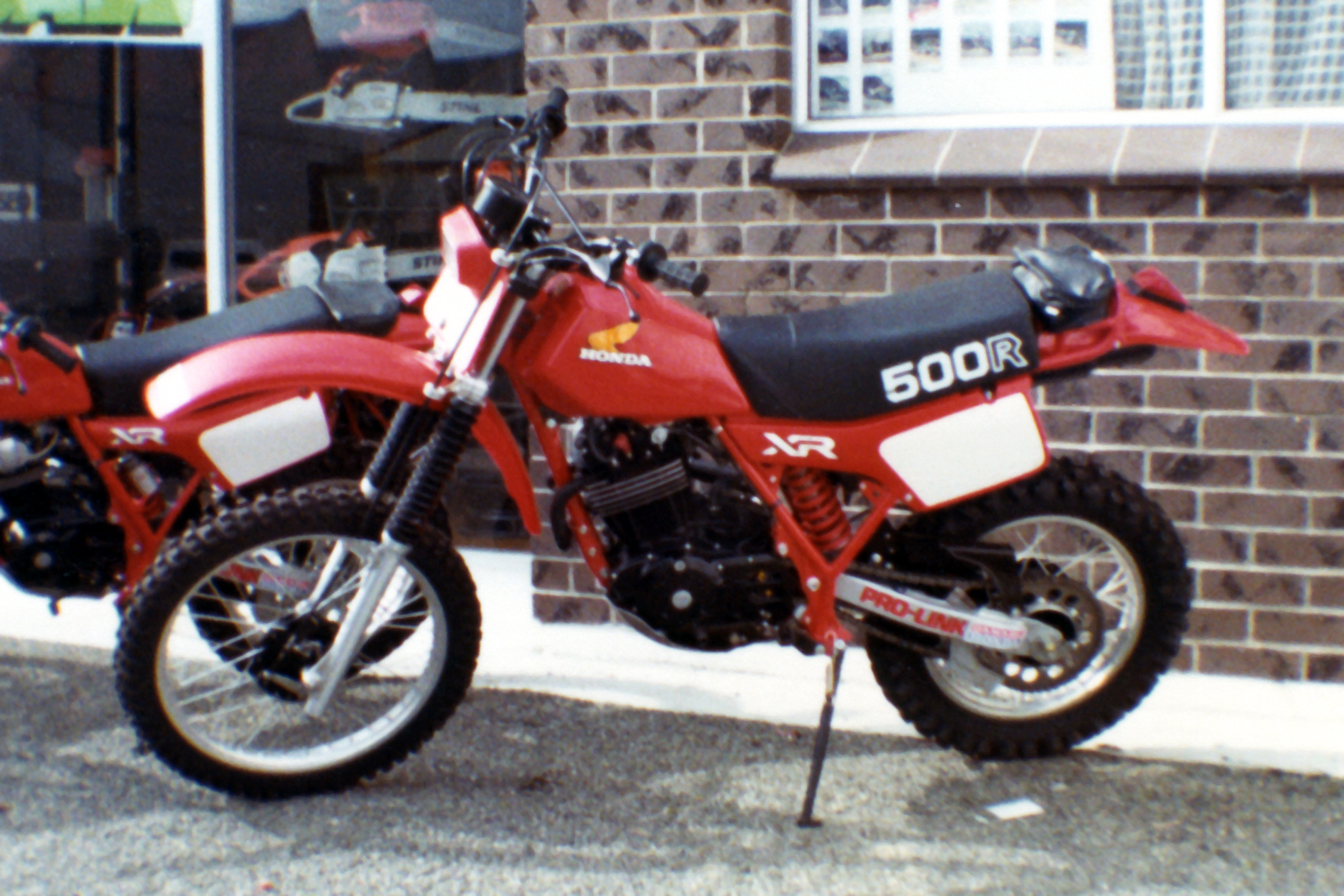
1982 Honda XR 500RC

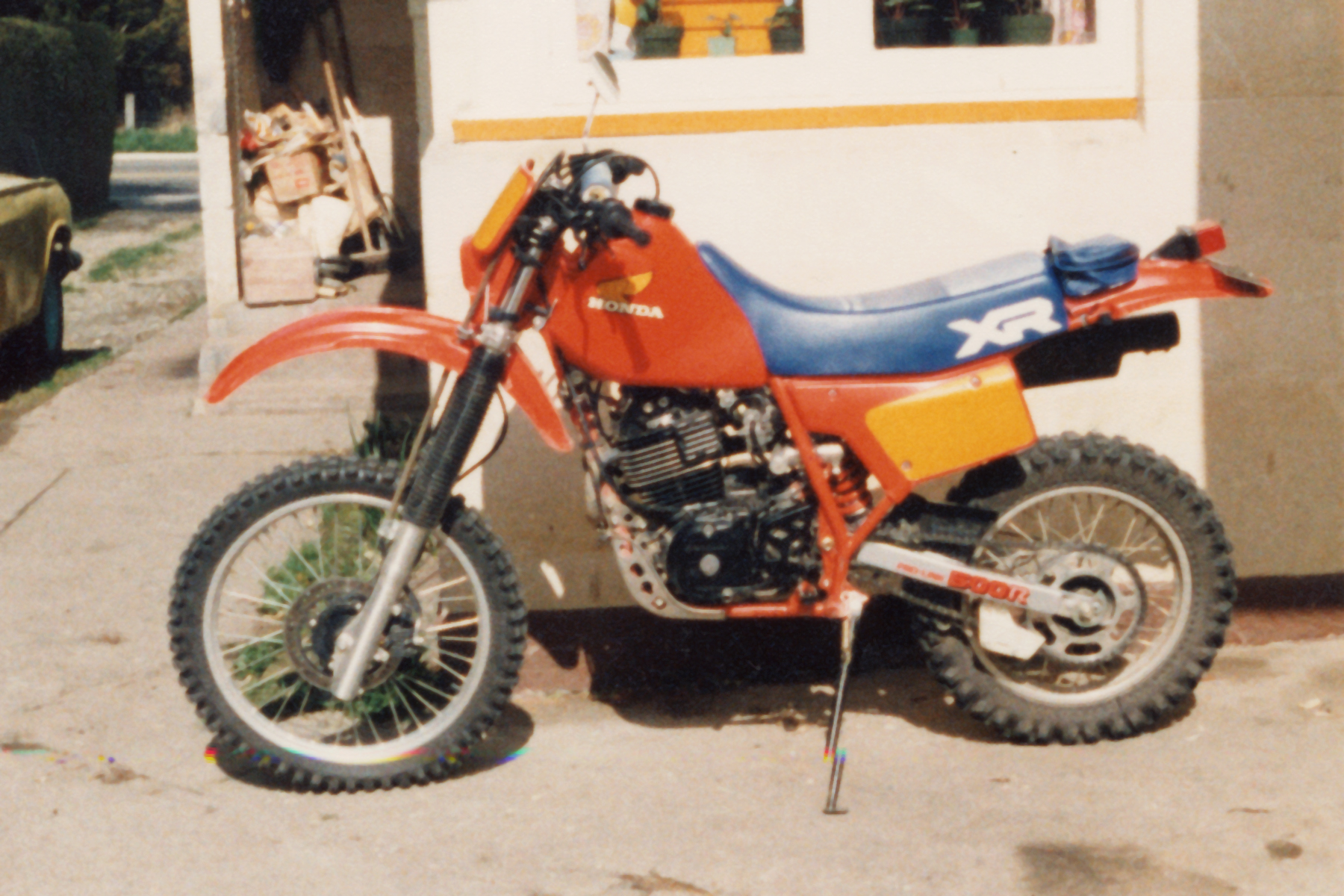
1984 Honda XR 500RE (with hand protectors removed)

The 1983 XR500R was thoroughly revised with a new dry-sump RFVC 5-speed engine which was lighter and more powerful than the older engine. Induction was by 2 carburetors, the first in use until 1/4 throttle, whereupon the second started to take effect. Power was 41 hp @6000 rpm, torque was 4.7 kg-m (34 lb-ft) at 5500 rpm, and dry weight was 266.7 lbs. The frame was entirely revised, and suspension was updated with 43mm air-adjustable forks with 11" of suspension travel both front and rear. Wheels were 21" front and 17" rear. The fuel tank had a 12-litre capacity, the front brake was a single hydraulic disc, and the handlebars sported plastic ‘bark-buster’ hand protectors.

The 1984 XR500RE model was the last 500cc XR, being superseded in 1985 by the larger Honda XR 600RF.

== XR600R ==
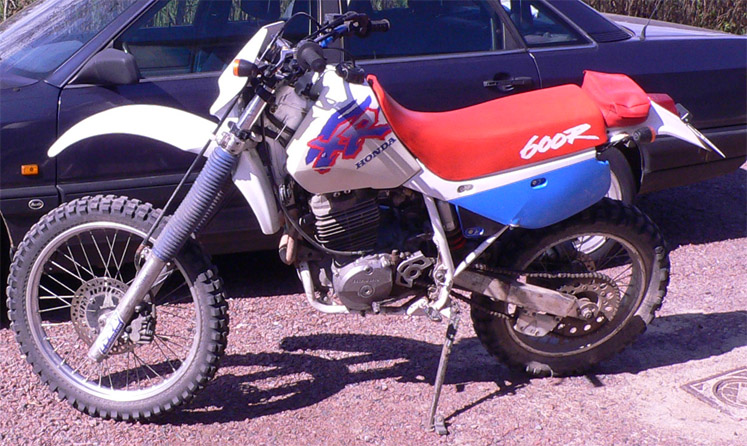
A 1993 Honda XR600R

The XR600R was used in Baja races. It was introduced in 1985 to replace the XR500R, and was updated in 1988 when the original dual progressively opening carburetors were replaced with a larger single carburetor and the rear brake was updated to a disc. The 600 was updated again in 1992. The XR won many desert races in the hands of Johnny Campbell and GNCC races in the hands of Scott Summers. Its engine architecture was very similar to the XR250R and later XR400R engines, (though of course larger and heavier). 600's responded well to modification. A common modification was to bore the cylinder to 100mm thereby increasing displacement to 628cc. HRC produced a "Power Up" kit that included a billet 100mm piston, a revised primary gear ratio (identical to that used later in the XR650L) and a hotter camshaft. XR600R's so modified were used by the Honda race team in Baja, as well as by many other desert racers. XR600R's earned a reputation for being nigh indestructible, able to handle large amounts of abuse and rough treatment.

== XR650R ==
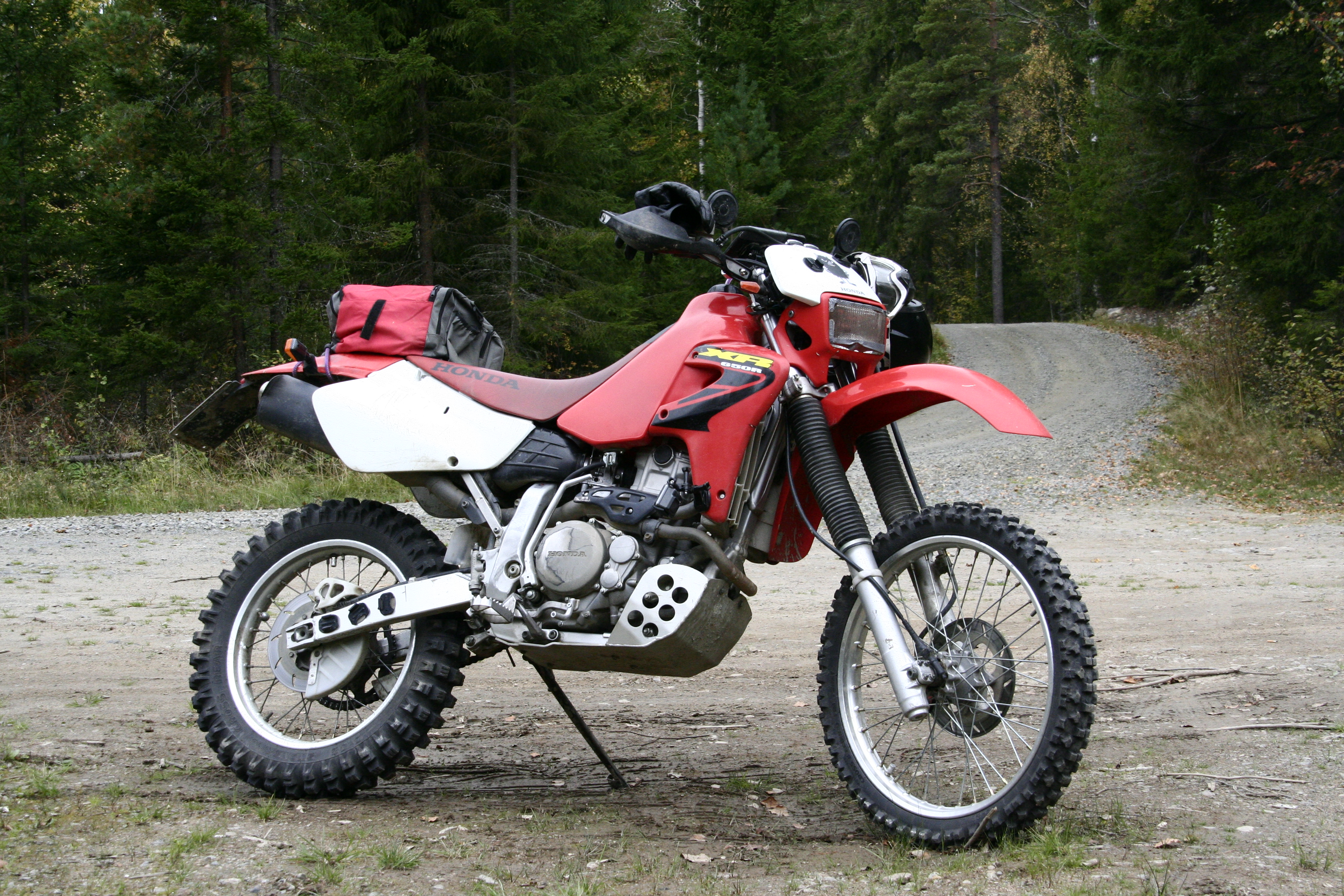
2003 Honda XR650R

Available from 2000 to 2007, the XR 650R was not just an update to the XR 600. An all-new 649 cc (39.6 cu in), liquid-cooled, SOHC engine was mated to an aluminum box frame. At 280 lb (130 kg) dry, it weighed more than the XR600R which it replaced but had a powerful engine. Honda appeared to be positioning itself in the long-range desert racing market with this bike. Team Honda and the XR650R posted numerous Baja 1000 wins during its production cycle, and many other desert race wins with Scott Summers and Johnny Campbell at the helm. Cancelled for the 2008 production year, the 'Big Red Pig (BRP)' continued to enjoy a following among Honda fans, and remained a competitive, open class 4-stroke enduro motorcycle.

=== XR650L ===
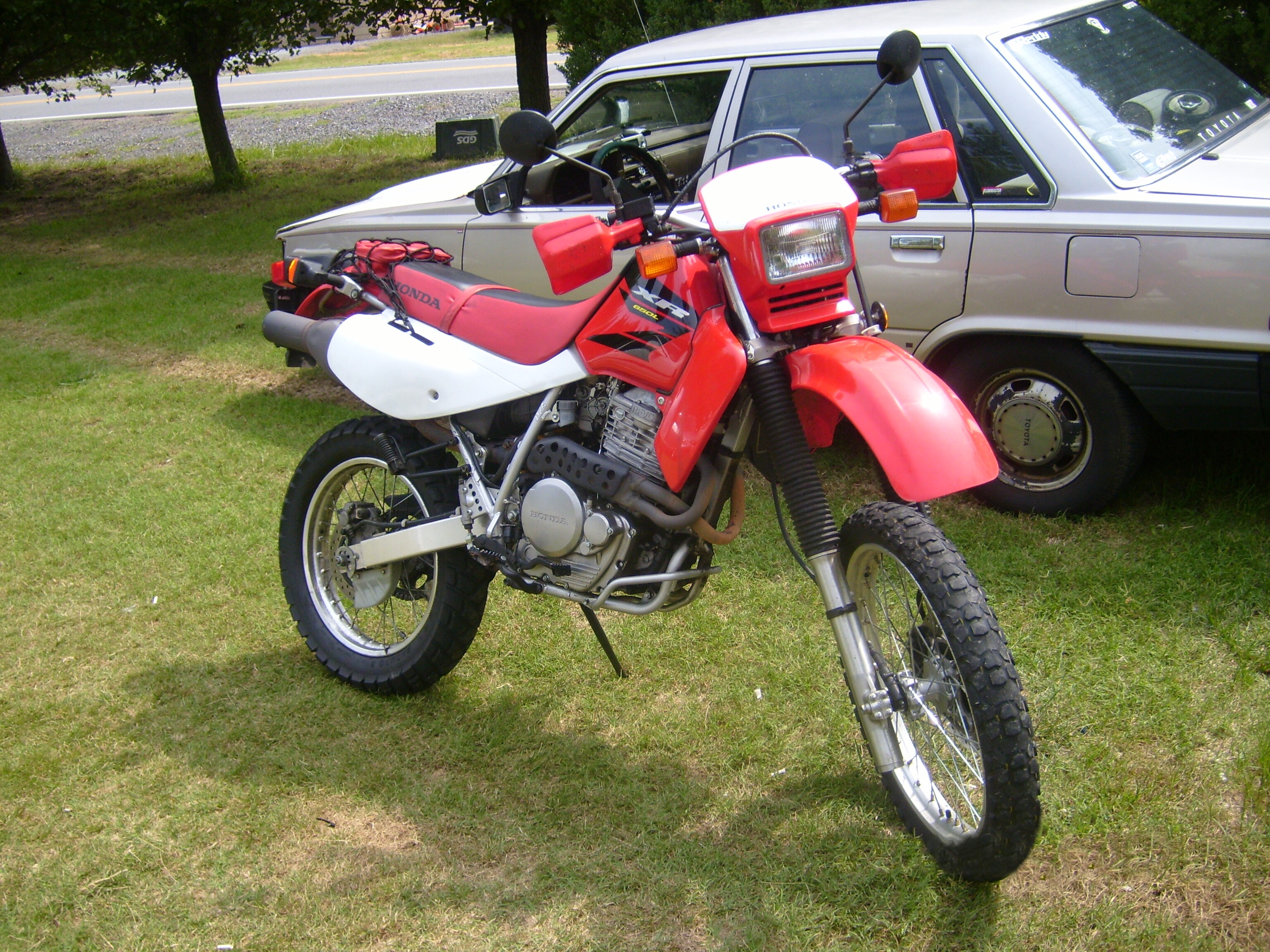
XR 650L

The Honda XR650L is a street/trail bike that is more similar to the XR 600R than to the XR 650R. It has a steel tube frame as opposed to an aluminum spar frame like in the XR 650R. It also has an air-cooled 644 cc (39.3 cu in) SOHC dry-sump single-cylinder four-stroke engine similar except for an increased displacement to the XR 600R, unlike the totally redesigned XR 650R that has a liquid-cooled 649 cc (39.6 cu in) SOHC dry-sump single-cylinder four-stroke engine. The 644 cc (39.3 cu in) engine first appeared in the NX650 Dominator in 1988 which makes it the longest produced RFVC engine made by Honda. With a headlight, taillight, turn signals, mirrors, smog system, revised exhaust system and a 2.8 gallon gas tank with 0.6 gal reserve, the 650L has a 349 lb (158 kg) wet weight.

The Honda XR650L is one of the longest running unchanged production models in the history of motorcycling and is still available today exactly as the 1992 model specifications.

== XRV650 ==
The Honda XRV650 (produced from 1988 to 1989) was the second twin cylinder production trail bike by Honda, the first one being the Honda XLV750R produced from 1983 to 1986. It was the first twin cylinder model in the XR series and as such started the XRV series, but it was soon replaced by the Honda XRV750 in 1990. The 650cc model was built in Japan by Honda Racing Corporation and is arguably a better built bike than following versions of XRVs, which were standard production models. It came as both single and double headlight variations, and featured a slightly tuned 650cc engine similar to the Honda Transalp (XL600V and XL650V) and high specification chassis components, leading to its rather brief production run. With an aftermarket larger capacity tank and very few other modifications the bike was entered in the marathon class of the Paris Dakar Rally, revealing its surprisingly good off-road abilities - despite its 200 kg weight, hence it belongs firmly to the XR range. It is the most sought after model of the Africa Twin XRV range and is fast becoming a collector's item, especially in Europe.

== Honda CRF ==
Honda XR's were eventually superseded by the CRF model lineup. Only the CRF230 model family had anything in common with the older XR's, as the CRF230 was powered by an enlarged version of the air-cooled, 2 valve XR200/200R engine. The rest of the CRF model lineup was all new.

== See also ==
- Honda CRF series
- Yamaha WR series
- Suzuki DR-Z series
- Kawasaki KLX series
