= Honda CL series =

Automobile series

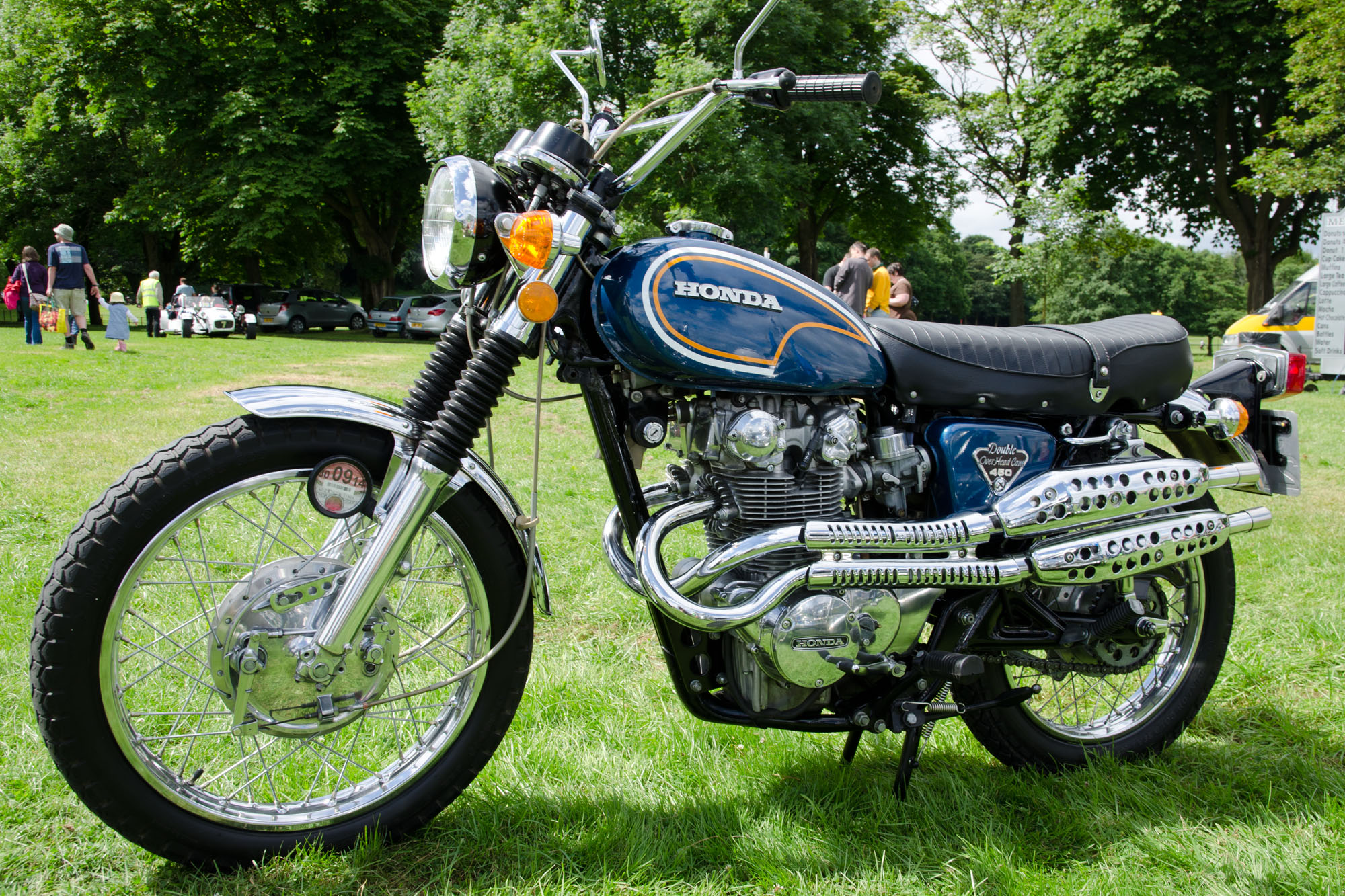
1972 Honda CL450

The Honda CL series refers to a line of dual-sport motorcycles produced by Honda from the mid-1960s.

Often marketed as "scramblers", notable features of the CL-series include high-mount upswept exhausts, rubber fork covers, and taller fenders.

== First series ==
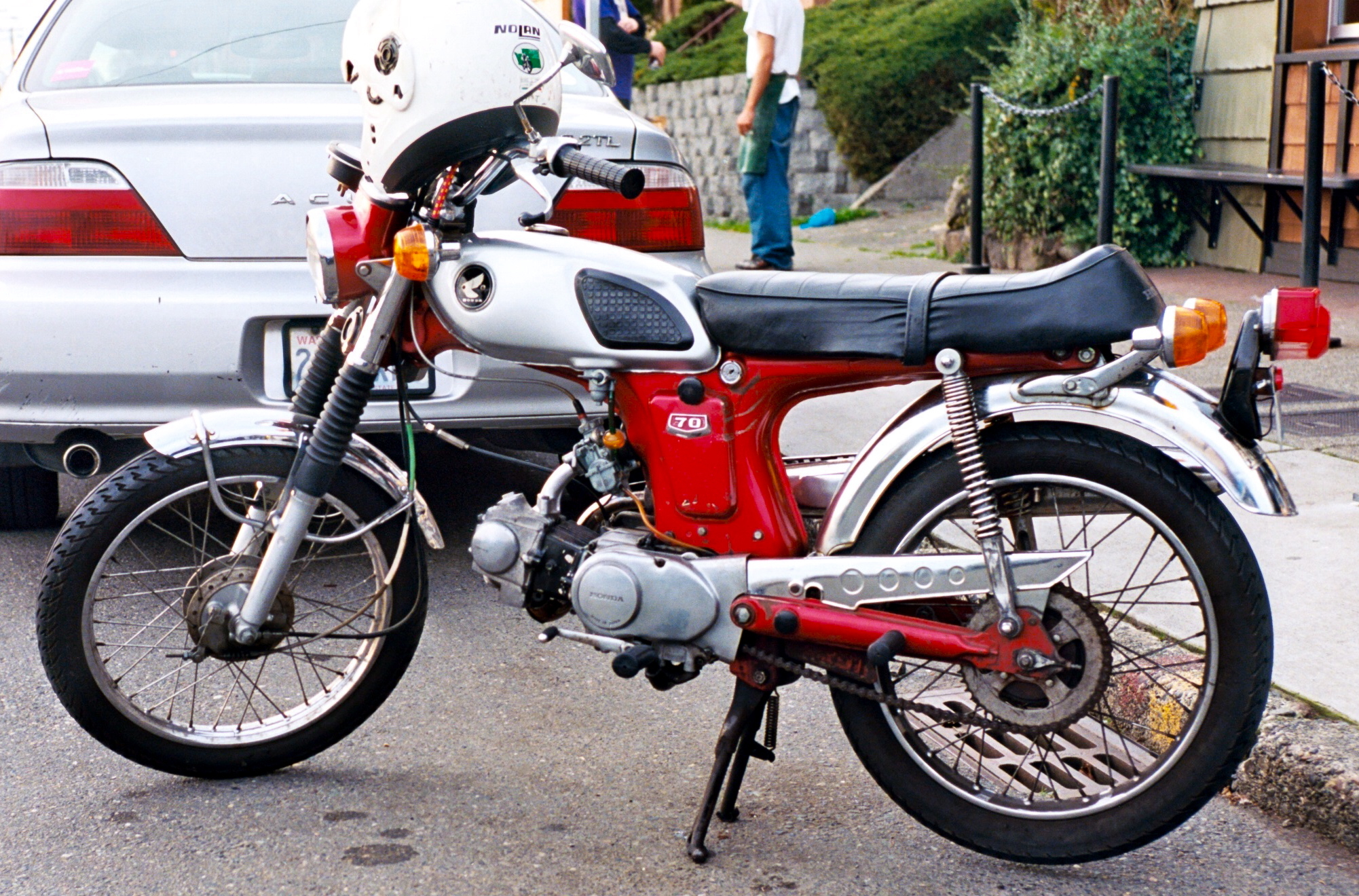
1969 Honda CL70

=== Single-cylinder ===
- Honda CL50
- Honda CL70
- Honda CL90
- Honda CL100 (1970–1973)
- Honda CL125 (1967–1974)

=== Twin-cylinder ===
- Honda CL72
- Honda CL77
- Honda CL160 (1966–1967)
- Honda CL175 (1968–1973)
- Honda CL200 (1974)
- Honda CL350 (1968–1973)
- Honda CL360 (1974–1976)
- Honda CL450 (1968–1975)

== Second series ==
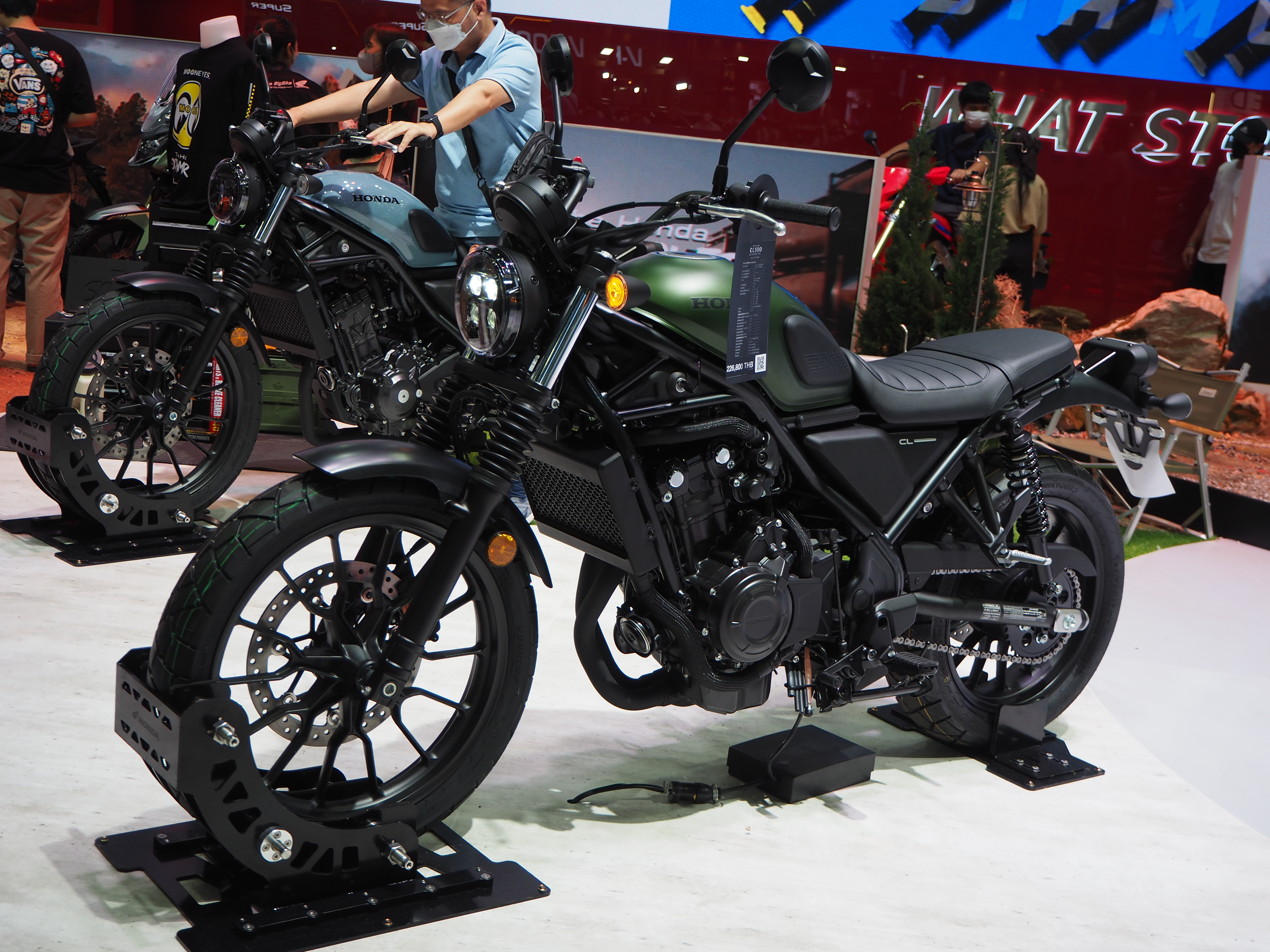
2023 Honda CL500

=== Single-cylinder ===
- Honda CL250 (2023–present)
- Honda CL300 (2023–present)

=== Twin-cylinder ===
- Honda CL500 (2023–present)
