= S90 =

S90 may refer to:

== Automobiles ==
- Daihatsu Zebra (S90), a pickup truck and van
- Honda Sport 90, a motorcycle
- Toyota Crown (S90), a sedan
- Volvo S90, an executive car

== Naval vessels ==
- HMS Torbay (S90), a submarine of the Royal Navy
- S90-class torpedo boat, of the Imperial German Navy
  - SMS S90, the lead boat of the class

== Rail and transit ==
- S90 (Long Island bus)
- S90 (New York City bus) serving Staten Island
- S90 (TILO), a railway service in Switzerland

== Other uses ==
- Canon PowerShot S90 a digital camera
- Series 90 (software platform), for mobile phones
- SIPA S.90, a French trainer aircraft
- Yamaha S90, a synthesizer
