= Honda CL450 =

Motorcycle model

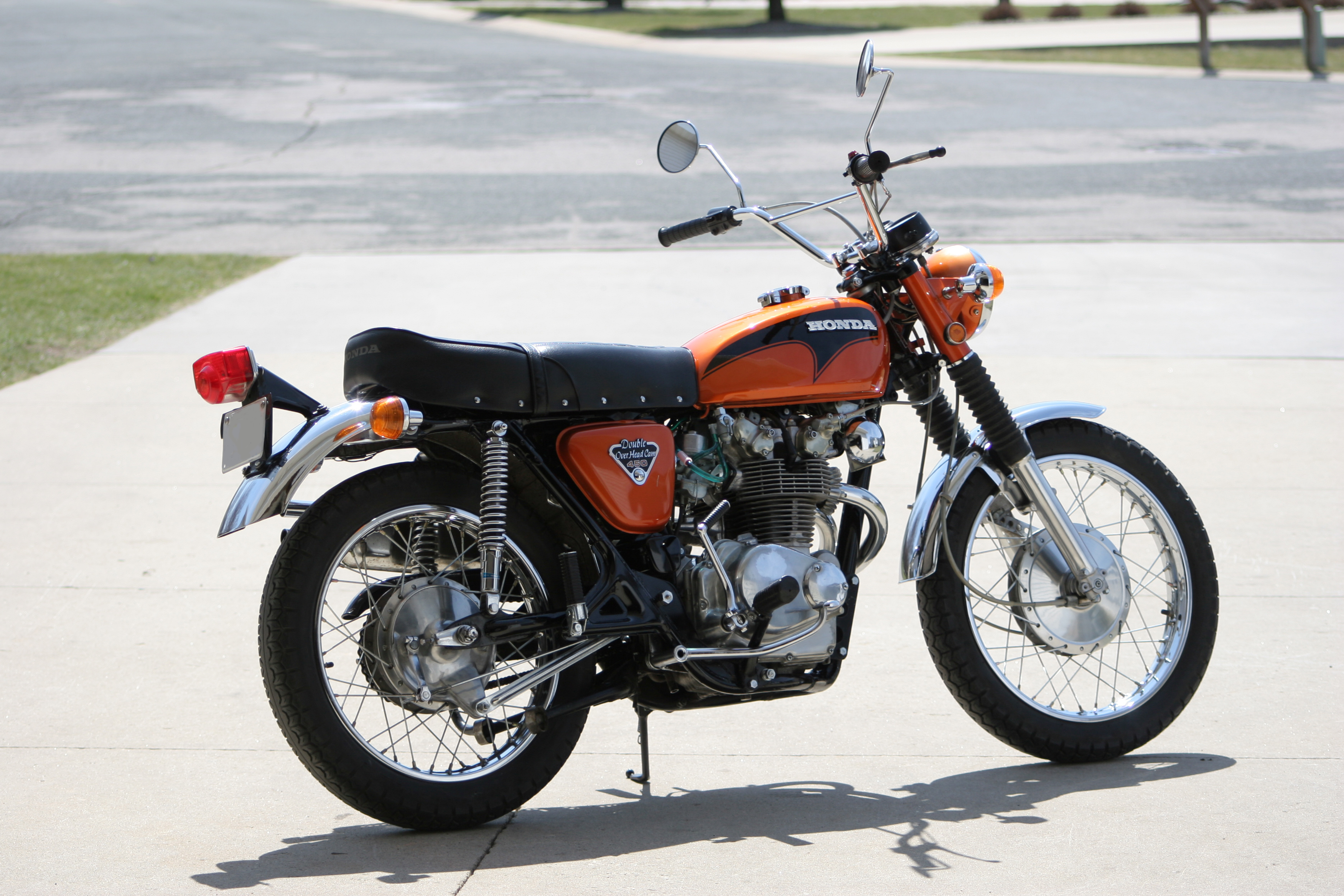

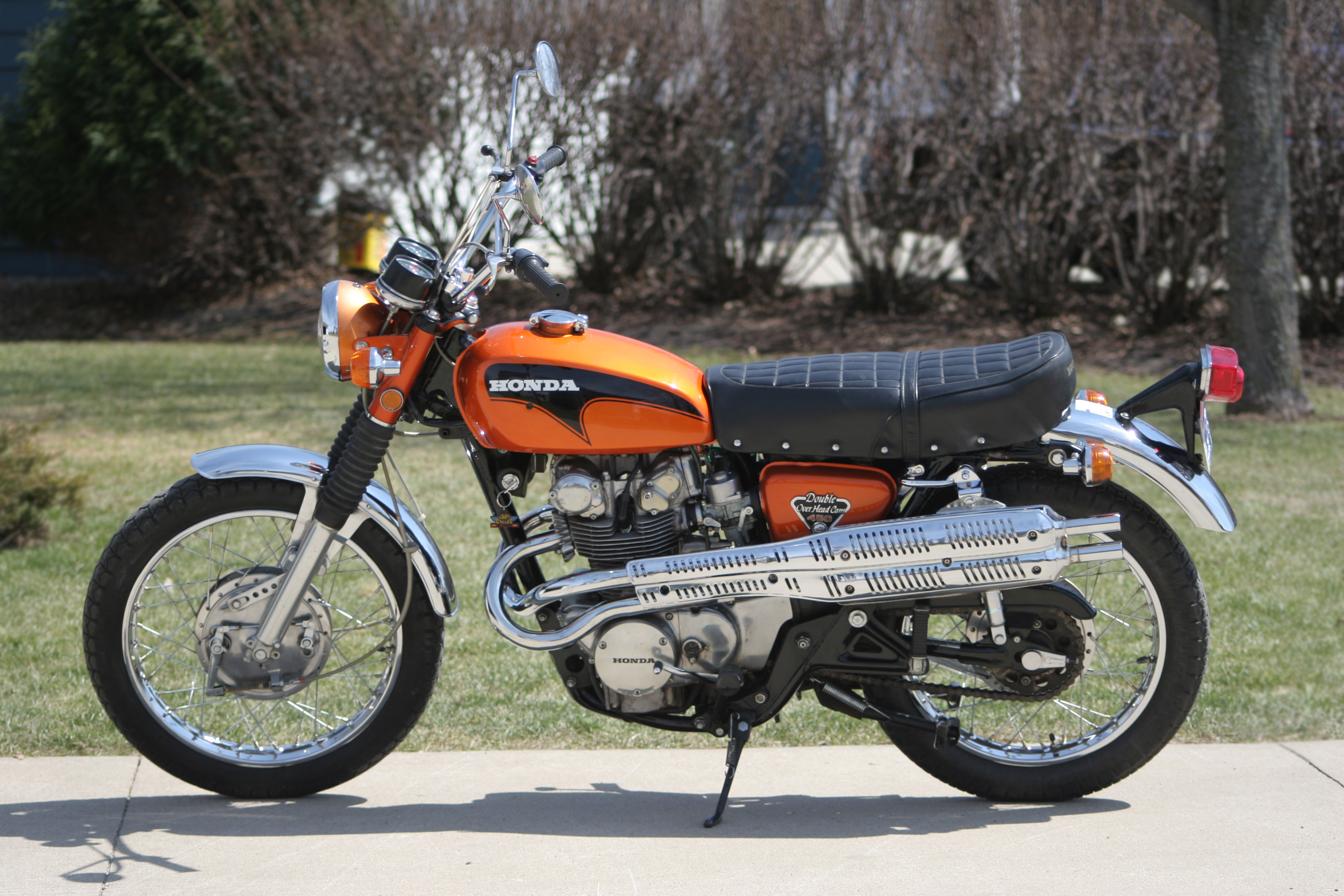
1971 CL450K4

The Honda CL450 was the dual sport or "scrambler" model of Honda's 450 cc (27 cu in) DOHC parallel-twin engined motorcycle. It was the sister bike to the Honda CB450.

== History ==
Initially available in kit form for the 1967 CB450, it was officially released in 1968 as the CL450K1 "Scrambler" in silver, candy red and candy blue colors (only the tank and air filter covers were painted). This year also saw the addition of a 5-speed gearbox, an upgrade from the older 4-speed. The CB450 went to a front disc brake in 1970, Honda decided to keep the CL450 with its two drum brakes. The CB450 was replaced in 1975 when Honda increased the displacement of the engine and renamed it the CB500.

== Design ==
The differences between the CB450 and the CL450 were mostly cosmetic, with the CL450 having off-road-style high-level exhaust.

The CL450's horsepower rating was 42 hp at 9,650 rpm off the crank, nearly 100 hp per liter. The CB450's gearing can be used for higher velocities. Vibration was a complaint, so Honda added rubber-mounted handle bars to overcome this to some degree. The CL450 wasn't nearly as mass-produced as the smaller 350–360cc versions.

== See also ==
- Honda CL500, the modern 'spiritual successor' of the CL450
- Honda CL series
