= Honda CB175 =

Motorcycle

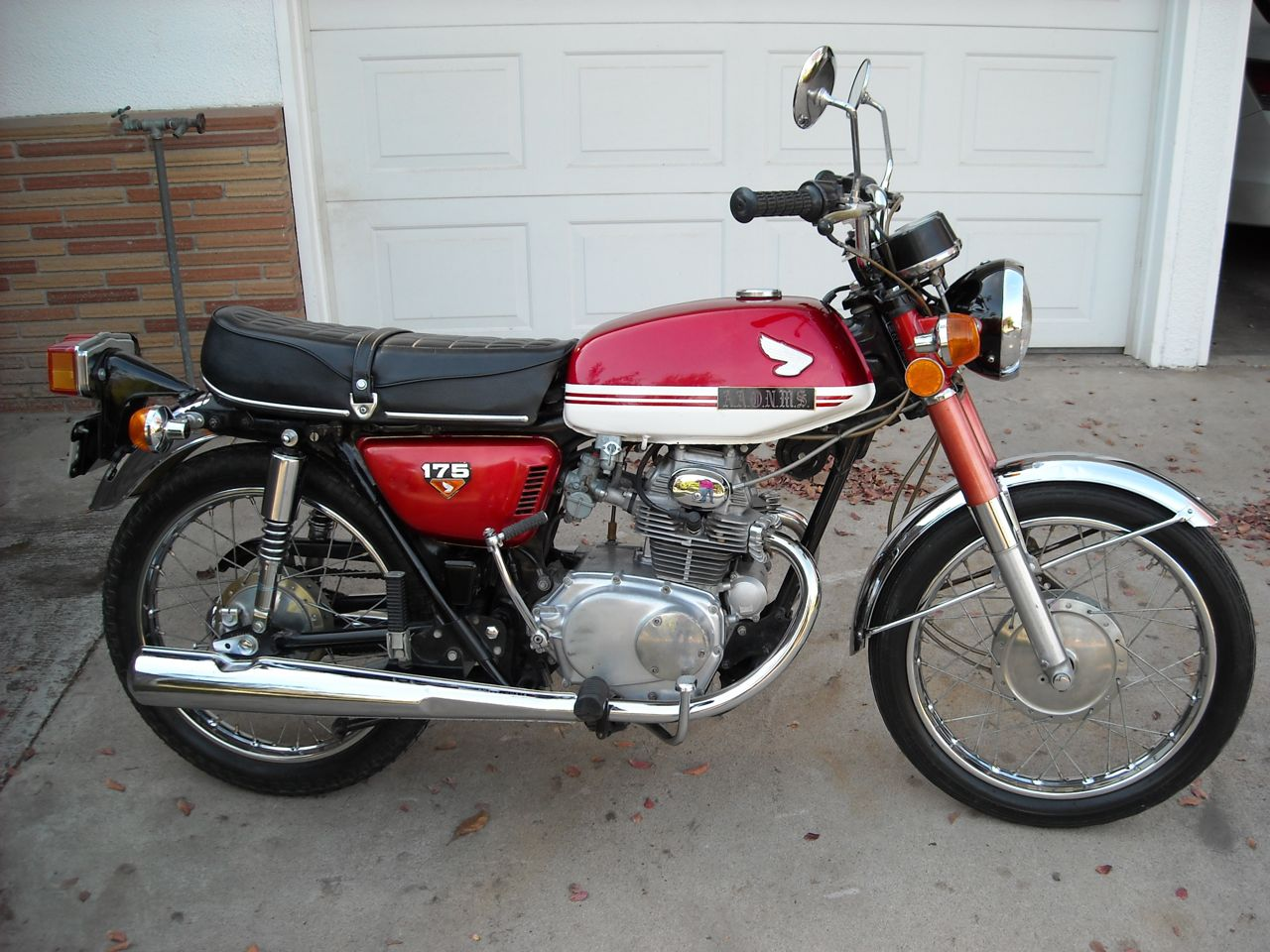
- Manufacturer: Honda
- Also called: CB175K3–CB175K7 Super Sport 175
- Production: 1969–1973
- Successor: Honda CB200
- Class: Standard
- Engine: 174.1 cc (10.62 cu in) air-cooled parallel twin
- Bore / stroke: 52 mm × 41 mm (2.0 in × 1.6 in)
- Compression ratio: 9:1
- Top speed: 86 mph (138 km/h)
- Power: 20 bhp (15 kW) @ 10,000 rpm
- Torque: 1.5 kg⋅m (15 N⋅m; 11 lbf⋅ft) @ 9,000 rpm
- Transmission: 5-speed, manual; chain final drive
- Suspension: Front: telescopic fork Rear: swingarm, twin shock absorber
- Brakes: Drum, front and rear
- Tires: Front: 2.75x18 Rear:3.25x18
- Wheelbase: 50.3 in (1,280 mm)
- Dimensions: L: 77.7 in (1,970 mm); W: 29.3 in (740 mm)
- Seat height: 30.3 inches (770 mm)
- Weight: 264 lb (120 kg) (dry)
- Related: CL175; CD175

The Honda CB175 is a standard motorcycle made by Honda from 1969 to 1973. It had a 175 cc (10.7 cu in) four-stroke, straight-twin engine with a single overhead camshaft, two valves per cylinder, dual slide-valve carburetors, and dual exhausts. It was also equipped with a five-speed gearbox, 12-volt electrics, kick and electric start, front and rear drum brakes, turn signals, speedometer with trip meter (1972 and later models), and tachometer, and was rated at 20 bhp (15 kW). An update in 1972, brought a more rounded gas tank and changes to the air box covers, along with some other minor trim changes. The CB175 was discontinued for 1974 and replaced by the CB200, a similar bike already in production. Although not technologically remarkable, Honda's small twins of the 1960s and 1970s were among their best sellers. Dual sport scrambler CL175, SL175 enduro style and touring CD175/CA175 versions were also produced.

The CB175 is remembered as Cycle World editor David Edwards' and others' first motorcycle.

== 1968 "sloper" variation ==
Honda offered an earlier version of the CB175 for the model year 1968. This bike combined features of the 1965-1967 CB160 with the 1969 and later CB175. The bike had a 174 cc (10.62 cu in) engine, dual carburetors, five-speed transmission, 12-volt electrics and turn signal indicators, electric and kick starter. It had dual drum brakes and an integrated speedometer/headlight assembly with no tachometer. The engine is used as part of the frame, unlike the 1969 and later CB175, and has a sharper forward slope to the cylinders. This version of the CB175, known as the "K0", was offered in the Asian, European, and Canadian markets as well as the United States.

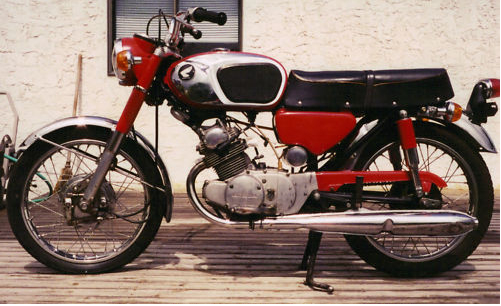
1968 variation CB175
