= Honda CB450 =

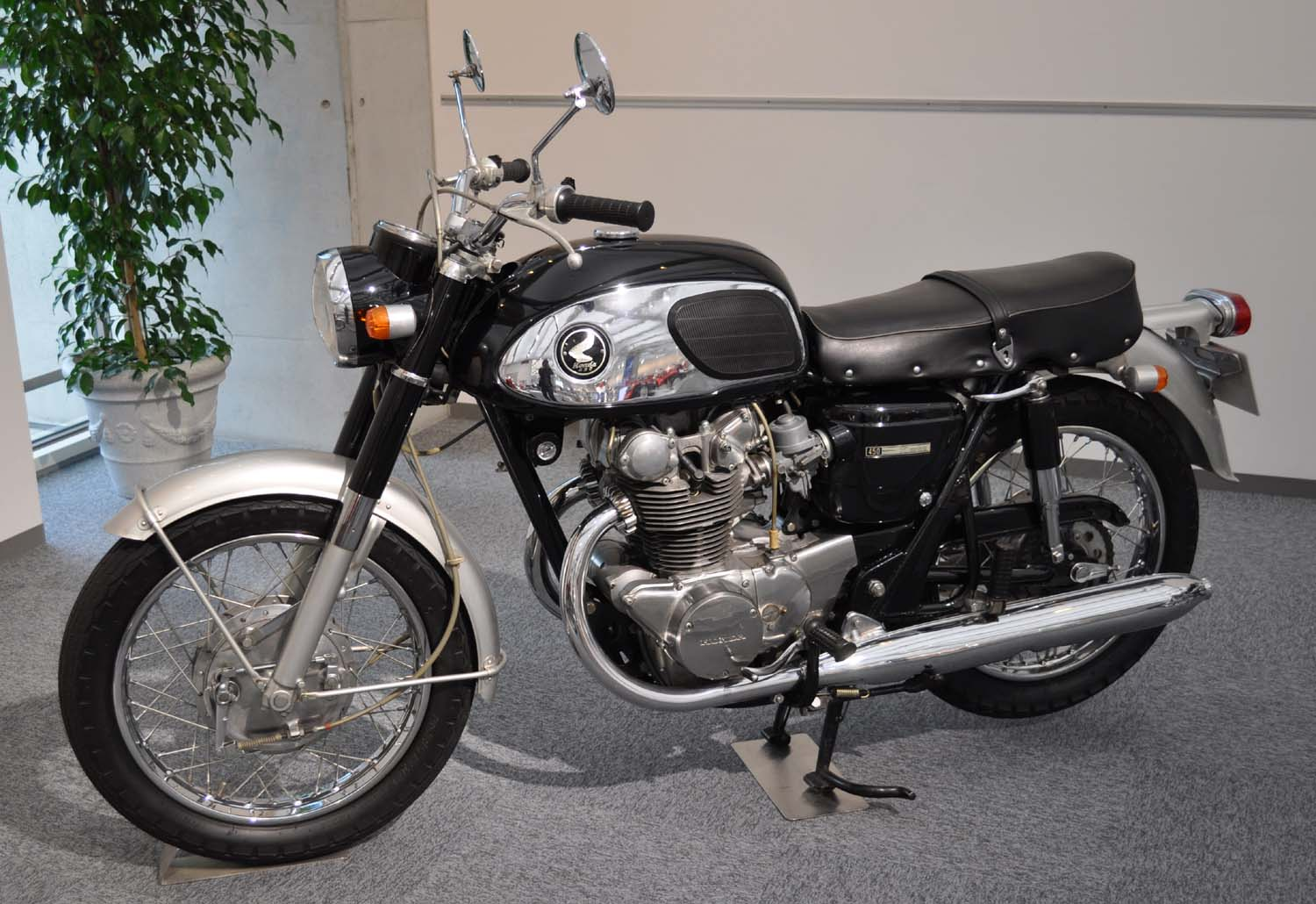
- 1965 Honda CB450
- Manufacturer: Honda
- Also called: Dream, Hellcat, Dragon
- Production: 1965–1974
- Predecessor: CB77
- Successor: CB500T
- Class: Standard
- Engine: 444 cc (27.1 cu in) DOHC straight-2, two 32 mm (1.3 in) CV carburettors
- Bore / stroke: 70 mm × 57.8 mm (2.76 in × 2.28 in)
- Compression ratio: 8.5:1
- Top speed: 180 km/h (110 mph) (claimed)
- Power: 43 hp (32 kW) @ 8500 rpm (claimed)
- Torque: 27.6 ft⋅lb (37.4 N⋅m) @ 8500 rpm (claimed)
- Ignition type: Coil with auto-advance, twin contact breakers
- Transmission: 4- or 5-speed, manual, chain final drive
- Frame type: Tubular semi-duplex cradle with single front down-tube
- Suspension: Front:telescopic forks with two-way damping Rear: swingarm, shock absorbers with adjustable preload
- Brakes: Drum, 8 in (200 mm) twin leading shoe at front
- Tires: 3.25x18 front, 3.50x18 rear
- Wheelbase: 53 in (1,300 mm)
- Dimensions: L: 82 in (2,100 mm); W: 31 in (790 mm); H: 42 in (1,100 mm)
- Weight: 412 lb (187 kg) (dry)
- Fuel capacity: 3.5 imp gal (15.9 L; 4.2 US gal)
- Oil capacity: 5 imp pt (2.8 L)
- Fuel consumption: 65 mpg_{‑imp} (4.3 L/100 km; 54.1 mpg_{‑US})

The Honda CB450 is a standard motorcycle made by Honda from 1965 to 1974 with a 444 cc (27.1 cu in) 180° DOHC straight-twin engine. Producing 45 bhp (some 100 bhp/ litre), it was Honda's first "big" motorcycle, though it did not succeed in its goal of competing directly against the larger Triumphs, Nortons, and Harley-Davidsons in the North American market at the time. As a result, Honda tried again, leading to the development of the four cylinder Honda CB750 that marked a turning point for Honda and beginning of the "superbike" era of motorcycles.

== Design ==
The CB450 had a distinctive chrome-sided fuel tank, and shared Honda's 'family' styling found elsewhere on the S90 and CD175. Early models were known as the 'Black Bomber', or 'Dragon', but in Canada the K1 model was marketed as the 'Hellcat'.

The four-speed K0 model was updated in the K1 model produced from 1968 with a redesigned fuel tank, rubber-gaitered front forks instead of sliding metal shrouds, a five-speed gearbox and twin speedometer and rev-counter instruments mounted above the headlamp.

Later developments progressed through a series of 'K' models with various improvements and styling changes including a single front disc brake, continuing to K7 versions in some markets, until the introduction of the CB500T in 1975.

== Release ==
The Mk.I 'Black Bomber' was first shown in UK during the Diamond Jubilee Brighton Speed Trials of September 1965, traditionally held along the seafront. The bike was newly imported and its engine was not run-in, yet in a semi-competition demonstration sprint, the CB450, ridden by Allan Robinson, MBE (a Honda staff member), achieved a standing-start kilometre time of 30.1 seconds and a terminal speed of 100 mph (160 km/h). Afterwards, the CB450 was exhibited at a motorcycle show at the Brighton Metropole Hotel exhibition centre.

In December 1965, the UK magazine Motor Cycle reported that UK sales were planned from February 1966, its price of £360 being the equivalent cost to a conventional British 650cc pushrod parallel-twin.

In a further publicity event, Honda (UK) entered Mike Hailwood as one of the riders in the Motor Cycle 500 mile production race at Brands Hatch during July 1966. However, Hailwood was able to complete only some demonstration laps on the CB450 before racing began, as it was barred from competing in the 500cc category, because the FIM had deemed that it "could not be classified as a production machine as it had two overhead camshafts"!

Although the CB450's sales never matched Honda's expectations, the bike had excellent engineering for the time, including reliable electrical components, an electric starter, and a horizontally split crankcase, all features distinct from current British twins. A radical feature was the valve springing: instead of the conventional coil springs, it used 'torsion bars' – rods of steel that twisted to provide the spring effect.

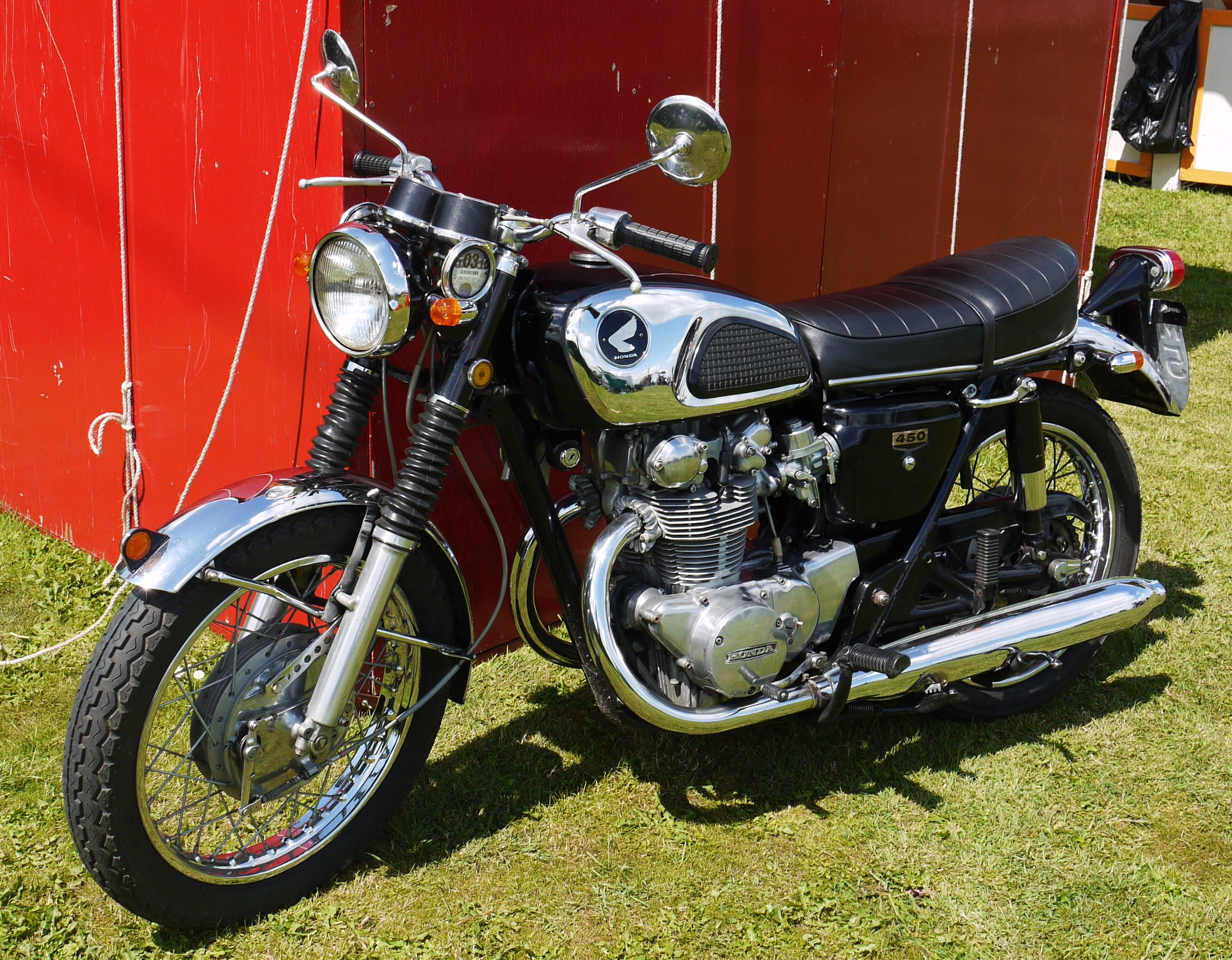
Second generation CB450 from 1968

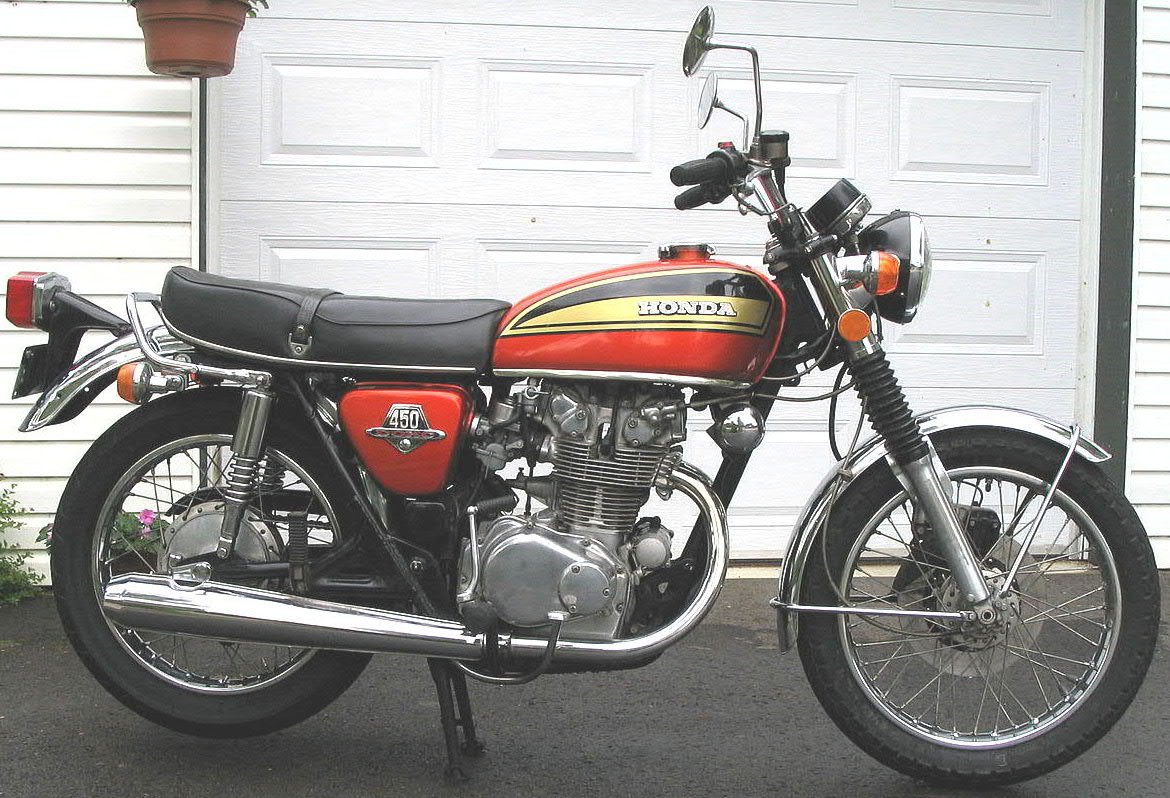
The last K7 version with hydraulic front disc brake
