= Honda CB500T =

Honda standard motorcycle (1975–1976)

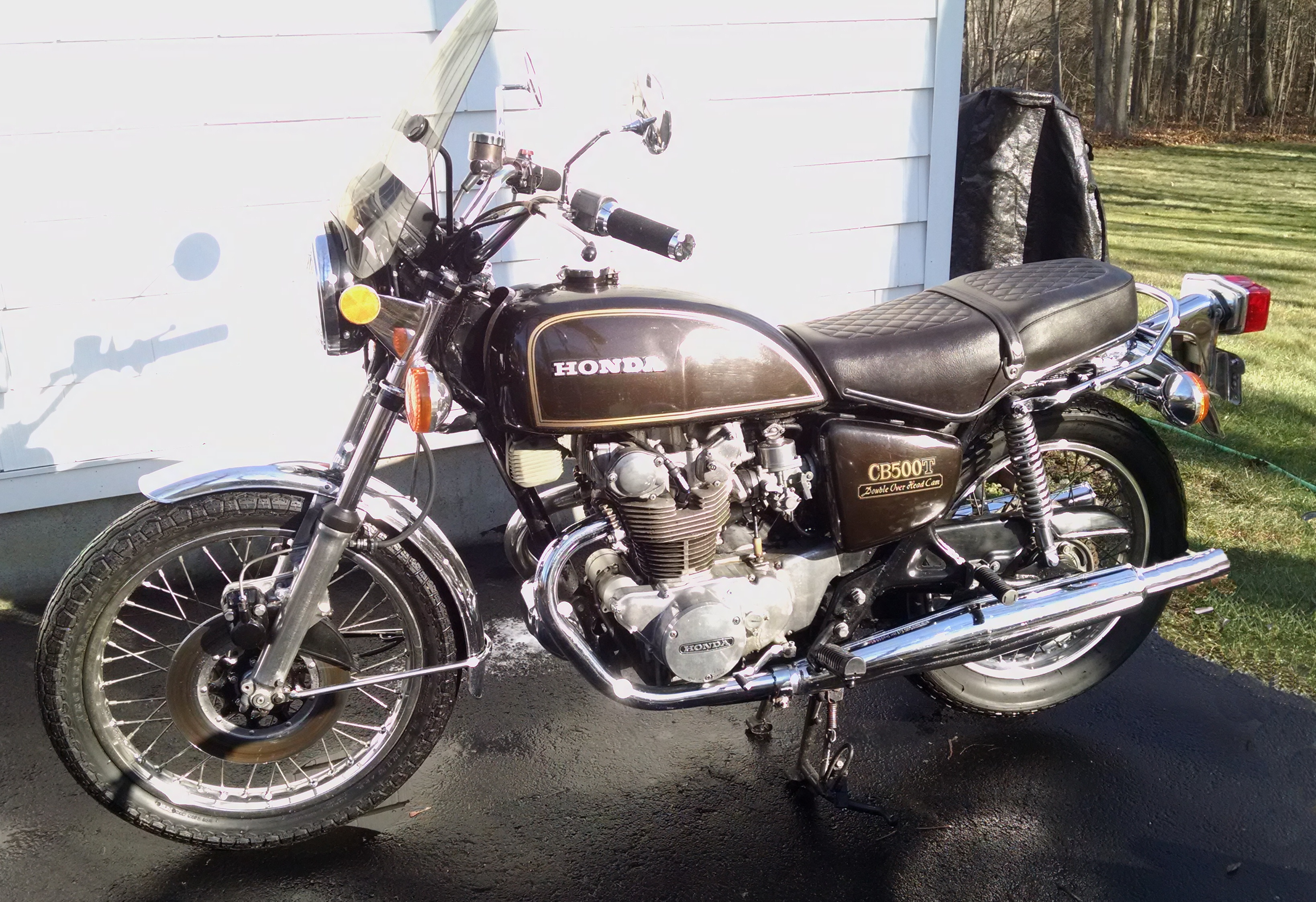
- 1975 CB500T
- Manufacturer: Honda
- Production: 1975–1976
- Predecessor: CB450
- Engine: 498 cc (30.4 cu in) DOHC parallel twin
- Bore / stroke: 70.0 mm × 64.8 mm (2.76 in × 2.55 in)
- Compression ratio: 8.5:1
- Top speed: 163 km/h (101 mph)
- Power: 25 kW (34 bhp) at 8,500 rpm (claimed)
- Torque: 30 N⋅m (22 lb⋅ft) at 7,000 rpm
- Transmission: 5-speed
- Frame type: Semi-double cradle
- Suspension: Front: telescopic fork, travel 121 mm Rear: swinging arm, travel 79 mm
- Brakes: Front: single disc Rear: drum
- Tires: Front: 3.25s/19-4PR rib pattern Rear 3.75S/18-4PR block pattern
- Wheelbase: 1,410 mm (56 in)
- Dimensions: L: 2,140 mm (84 in); W: 835 mm (32.9 in); H: 1,135 mm (44.7 in) (less mirrors)
- Seat height: 810 mm (32 in)
- Weight: 193 kg (425 lb) (dry)
- Fuel capacity: 16 L (3.5 imp gal; 4.2 US gal)

The Honda CB500T is a standard motorcycle built by Honda and sold in 1975 and 1976. It bears a close resemblance to the model from which it was derived — the later 5-speed version of the CB450 which was discontinued in 1974.

== Details ==
The engine is an air-cooled 498 cc (30.4 cu in) double overhead cam (DOHC) vertical parallel twin with 180° crankshaft angle, and torsion bar valve springs. The air/fuel mixture is delivered by two 32 mm Keihin Constant Velocity (CV) carburetors.

The transmission is a 5-speed.

== Reception ==
While not receiving much praise from reviewers or riders, Cycle World took note of its comfortable and roomy seat in its 1975 test, writing, "Unusual in that it is brown in color, it is long enough to carry a briefcase or passenger without crowding the rider. And the padding is soft enough for comfort. Believe us, without this seat you couldn’t ride a 500T very far and get off smiling."
