= Honda CL500 =

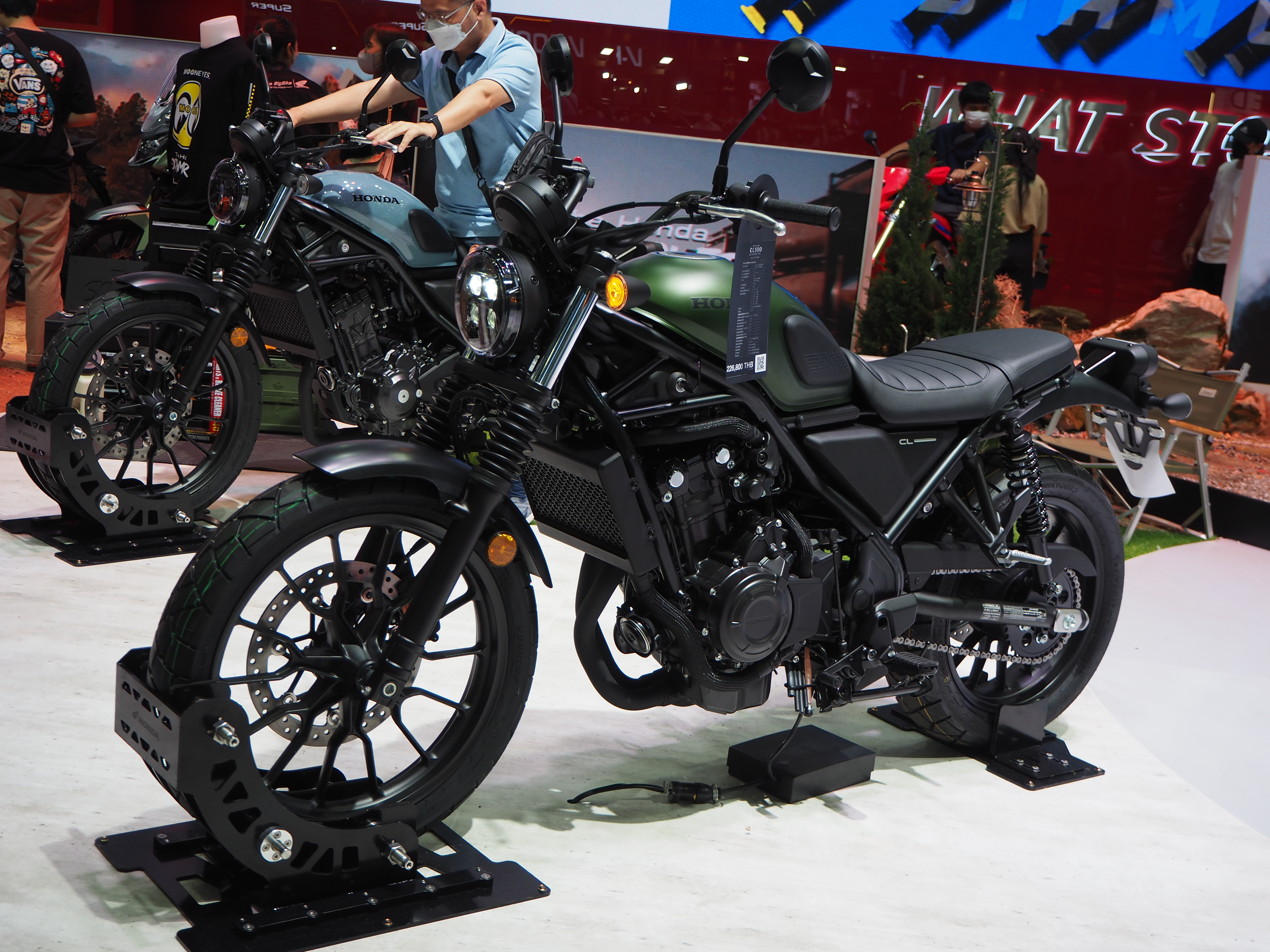
- 2023 Honda CL500
- Manufacturer: Honda
- Also called: Honda SCL500
- Production: 2023–present
- Class: Standard
- Engine: 471 cc (28.7 cu in) liquid-cooled 4-stroke 8-valve DOHC straight-twin engine
- Bore / stroke: 67.0 mm × 66.8 mm (2.64 in × 2.63 in)
- Compression ratio: 10.7:1
- Power: 34 kW (46 hp)
- Torque: 43 N⋅m (32 lb⋅ft)
- Transmission: 6-speed manual
- Wheelbase: 1,485 mm (58.5 in)
- Seat height: 790 mm (31.1 in)
- Weight: 192 kg (423 lb) (wet)
- Fuel capacity: 12 L (3.2 US gal)
- Fuel consumption: 3.60 L/100 km (78.5 mpg_{‑imp})
- Related: Honda CL300

The Honda CL500 (also called the Honda SCL500 in North America) is a standard motorcycle produced by Honda since 2023.

The motorcycle is designed with a flat seat and upswept exhaust as part of the "Scrambler-style" marketing and appearance, acting as a spiritual successor to Honda's previous CL-series bikes - such as the CL450. It uses the same 471 cc (28.7 cu in) 180° crank straight-twin engine as Honda's other 21st century "500-twins", such as the CB500F. The CL500's tubular steel frame's main structure is shared with the CMX500 Rebel.

The 2025 model included ergonomic adjustments to the footpegs and seat, as well as updated compliance with Euro V+ emissions standards.

== See also ==
- Honda CL series
- Honda 500 twins
