= Honda CB200 and CL200 =

Honda CB200
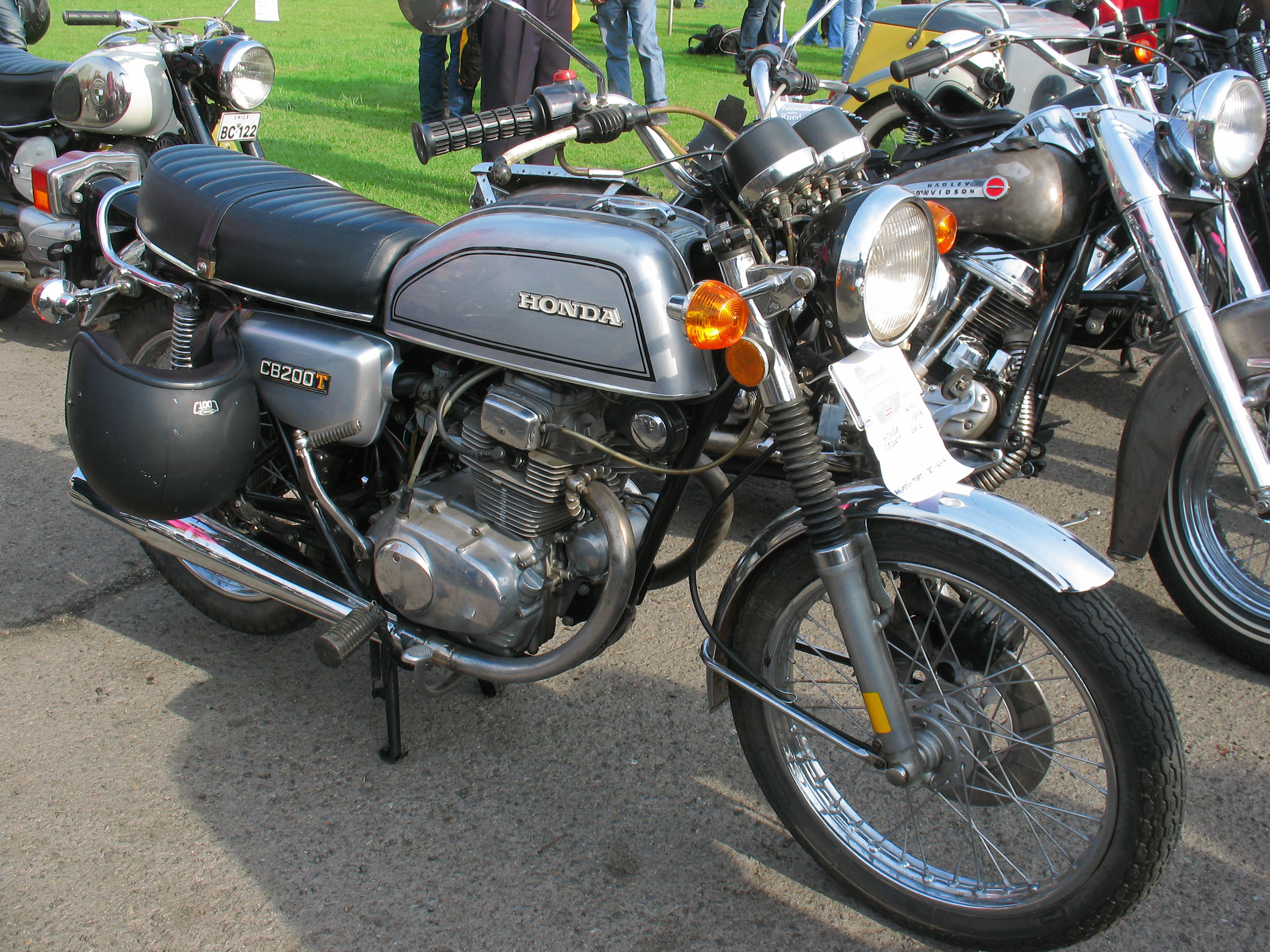
- Manufacturer: Honda
- Production: 1973–1976
- Predecessor: Honda CB175
- Successor: Honda CB250
- Class: Standard
- Engine: 198 cc (12.1 cu in) Twin
- Ignition type: Kick start Electric starter
- Transmission: 5-speed, manual, chain final drive
- Suspension: Telescopic fork/twin rear shock absorbers
- Brakes: Drum/drum (A) disc/drum (B)
- Tires: Front 2.75-18 Rear 3.00-18
- Dimensions: L: 2 meters (tyre limits)
- Fuel capacity: 9 L (2.0 imp gal; 2.4 US gal)
- Related: Honda CL200

The Honda CB200 and CL200 Scrambler are standard and dual-sport motorcycles made from 1973 to 1976. The CB200 replaced the CB175 model and has very similar specifications. The CL200 shares many parts with the CB200 but has an upswept exhaust system to avoid off-road hazards.

The CB200 has a chain driven single overhead camshaft parallel twin engine with dual carburetors and five-speed gearbox. It had both an electric and kick starter. A distinguishing feature is the rubber trim down the middle of the fuel tank. Depending on where in the world the bike was sold it is known as a CB200A/CB200B or CB200K/CB200T. All CB200s had a rear drum brake. Early models (CB200A - 73 and 74) had a drum front brake, later models (CB200B - 75 and 76) had a cable operated front disc brake.

== CL200 Scrambler ==
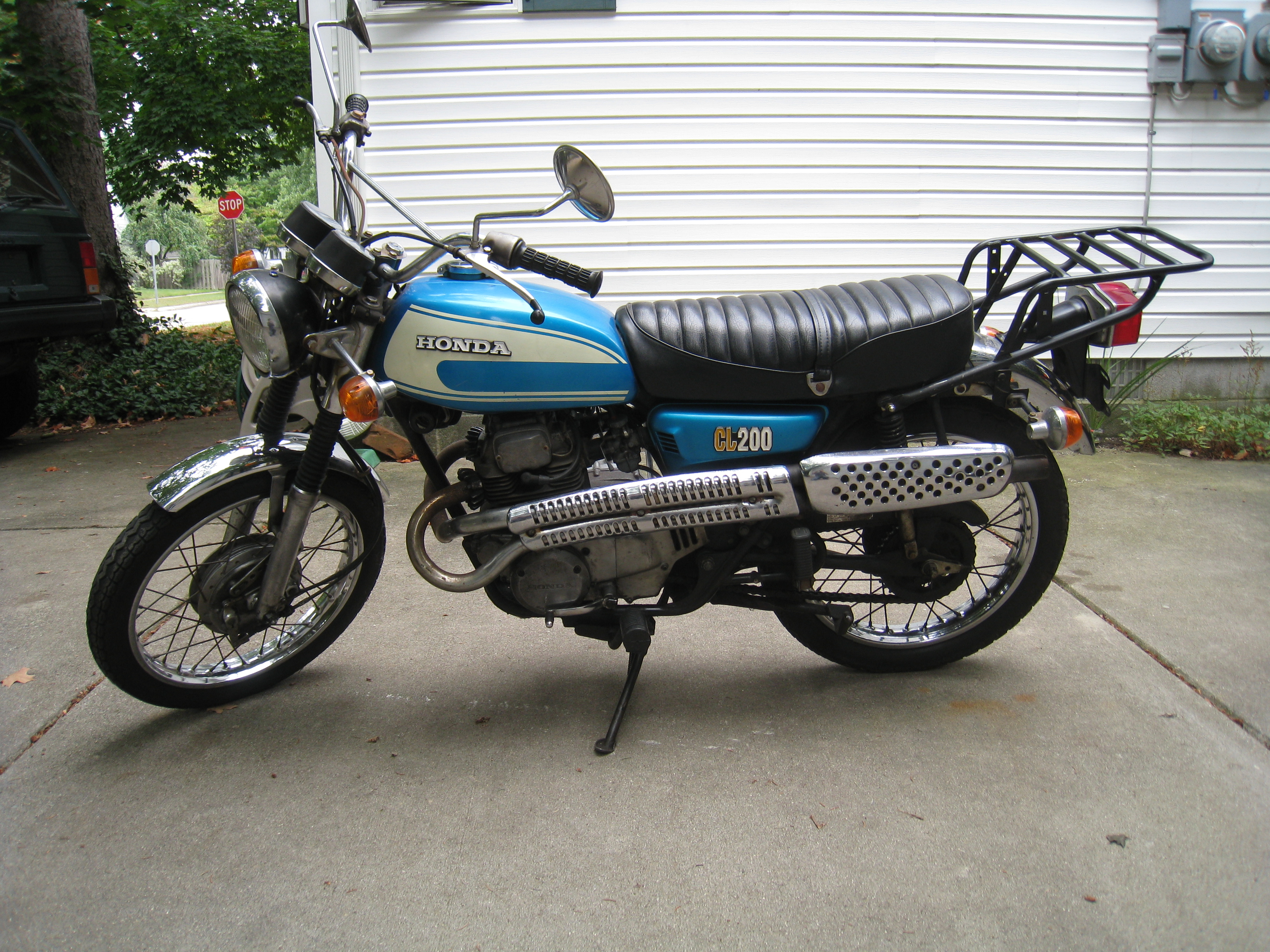
1974 Honda CL200

The CL200 Scrambler was a dual-sport made only in 1974, with a 198 cc (12.1 cu in) four-stroke OHC parallel twin cylinder engine mated to a 5-speed transmission. It was similar to the CB200 except the exhaust system of the Scrambler was mounted above the gearbox with both pipes on the left side of the bike, whereas on the CB200 it was mounted under the transmission gearbox on both sides of the bike. The CL exhaust pipe and heat shield were chrome. Other differences include a smaller tank than the CB200, a larger seat, braced handlebars, and different paint schemes. The CL200 was only offered in Candy Riviera Blue.

The 1974 CL200 marked the end of the evolution of the smaller Honda twin scramblers that began with the CL160 in 1965. As many other motorcycles were ever increasing in size, the 1974 CL200 was introduced and marked the end of the line as it was not continued into a second year.
