= Honda CL100 =

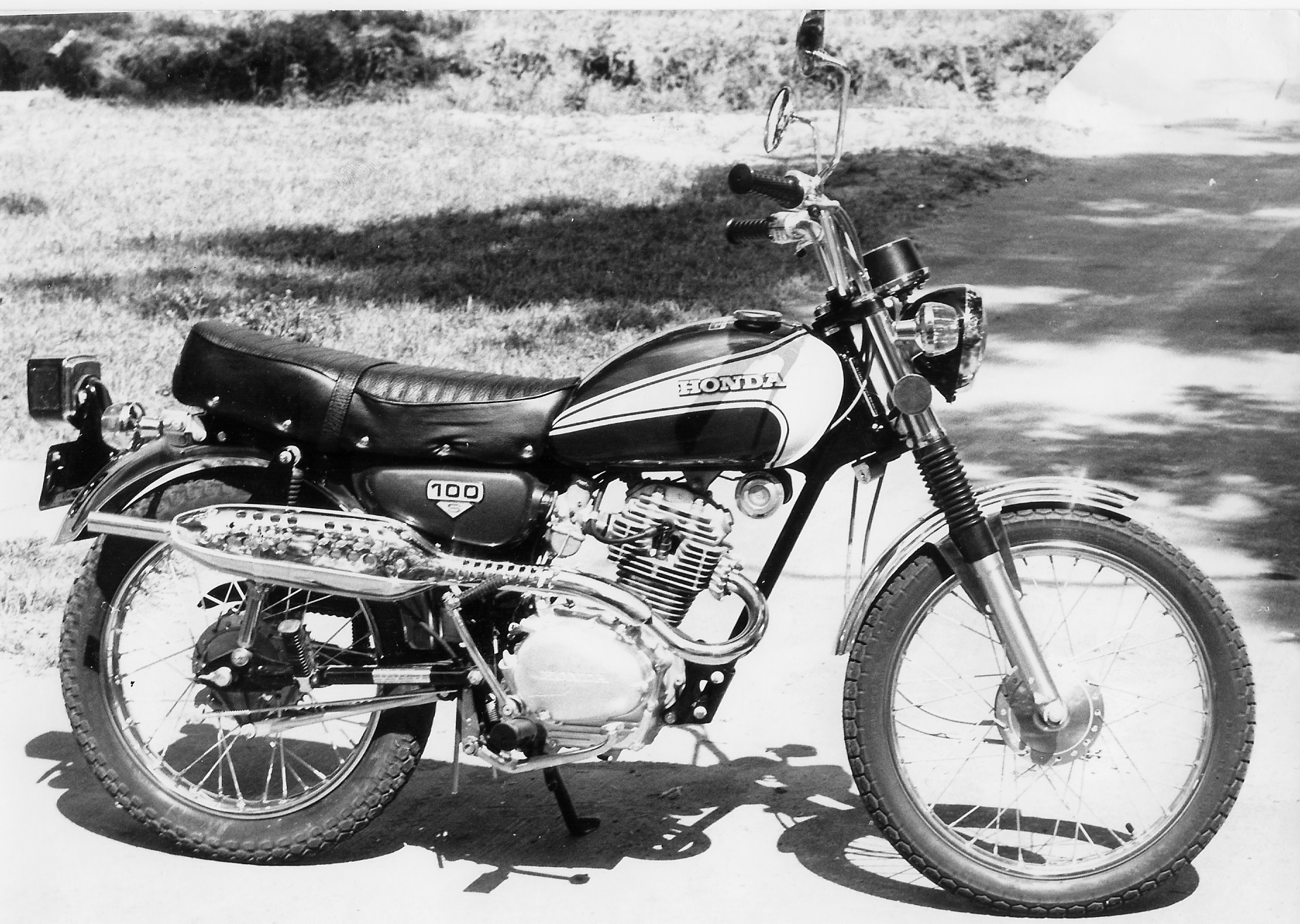
- 1973 CL100S
- Manufacturer: Honda
- Production: 1970–1973
- Engine: 99 cc (6.0 cu in) four-stroke, single
- Ignition type: Kick start
- Transmission: 5-speed chain drive manual
- Brakes: Front drum / Rear drum

The Honda CL100 was a four stroke single cylinder overhead cam motorcycle made by Honda, and sold in the US from 1970 to 1973. The CL designation indicated this model to be the "Scrambler" or dual sport version.

== Specifications and features ==
The machine had a high mount chrome exhaust with heat-shield, a 6-volt electrical system and instrumentation consisted of a speedometer with neutral indicator, high-beam warning, and odometer.

== Performance ==
The 99 cc (6.0 cu in) engine produced 11.5 HP according to Honda. This was sufficient to propel the bike with a small rider to about 71 mph (114 km/h). The CL100 was also available in a model designated CL100S (1971–1973), which had a governor to reduce power to 5 HP to meet some state restrictions for younger operators. In this mode, top speed was about 50 mph.
