= Honda CL125 =

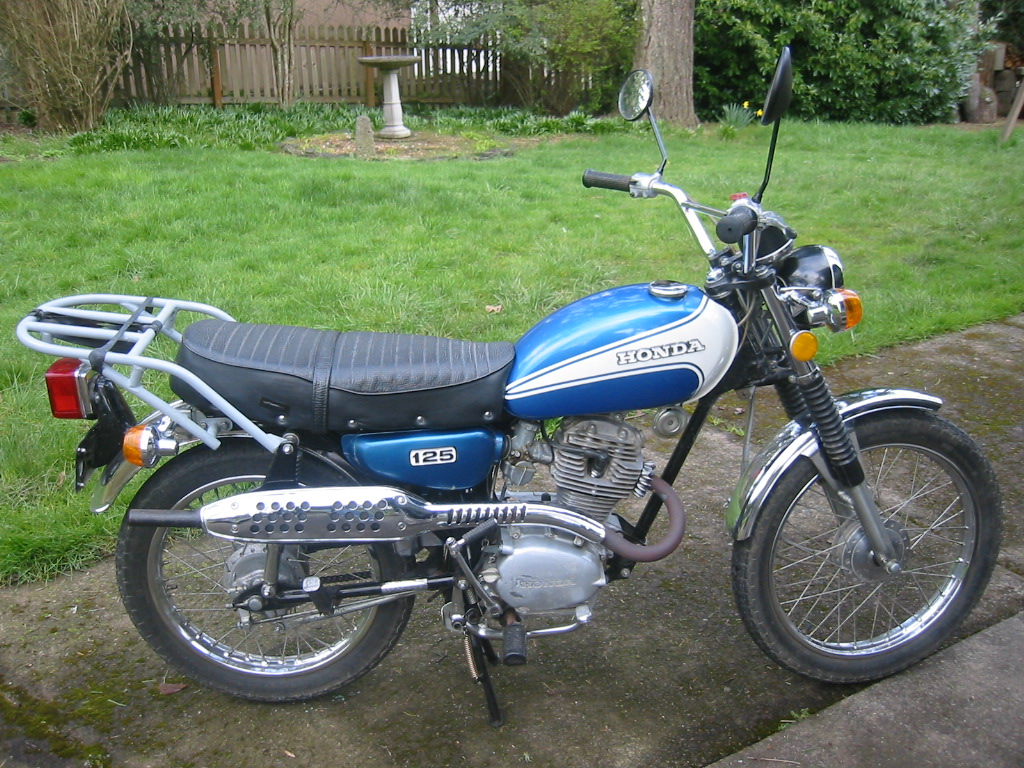
- 1973 Honda CL125S
- Manufacturer: Honda
- Also called: Honda Scrambler
- Production: 1967-1974
- Assembly
- Predecessor
- Successor
- Class: Scrambler
- Engine: 122 cc (7.4 cu in), SOHC, air-cooled, single-cylinder. (1973-1974); 124 cc (7.6 cu in) SOHC, air-cooled, Parallel Twin. (1967-1969)
- Top speed: 55 MPH
- Power: 14HP @ 10,000RPM
- Torque: 1.06 kg-m (7.67 ft. lbs) 8,500 rpm
- Ignition type: Kick start
- Transmission: 5-speed manual, chain final drive
- Suspension: Front: telescopic forks Rear: swingarm with two spring/shock units.
- Brakes: Front: drum Rear: drum
- Tires: Front: 2.75-18-4; Rear: 3.00-18-4
- Rake, trail: 86 mm (3.38 inches)
- Wheelbase: 1,270 mm (50.0 inches)
- Dimensions: L: 1,930 mm (76.0 inches); W: 830 mm (32.7 inches); H: 1,040 mm (41 inches)
- Seat height: 737 mm (29.0 inches)
- Weight: 117.0 kg (258 pounds) (dry) (wet)
- Fuel capacity: 10.5 litres (2.8 gallons)
- Fuel consumption: 65 MPG

The Honda CL125 was a scrambler motorcycle made by Honda from 1967 to 1974. Two different engines were used through the models life: 1967-1969: CL125A 124cc 2 cylinder 4-stroke, 1973-1974: CL125S 122cc 1 cylinder 4-stroke.

The CL125A was produced from 1967 to 1969 with a 124 cc 4-stroke engine and four-speed transmission. It was the smallest OHC twin cylinder four-stroke that Honda made, and was the smaller sibling to the 160, 175, 350 & 450 models.

In 1970, Honda introduced a 99 cc OHC single-cylinder four-stroke engine that was subsequently used in several CB, CL, and SL models. In 1973, Honda introduced the CL125S with a 122 cc version of this engine.

The CL125S was closely related to the CL100 produced from 1970 to 1973. The CL125S differed in that it had lower final-drive gearing, different tires, a shorter front fender, a braced handlebar, a high-mounted exhaust, and it lacked a tachometer. The CL125S had a reported dry weight of 196 lb (89 kg).

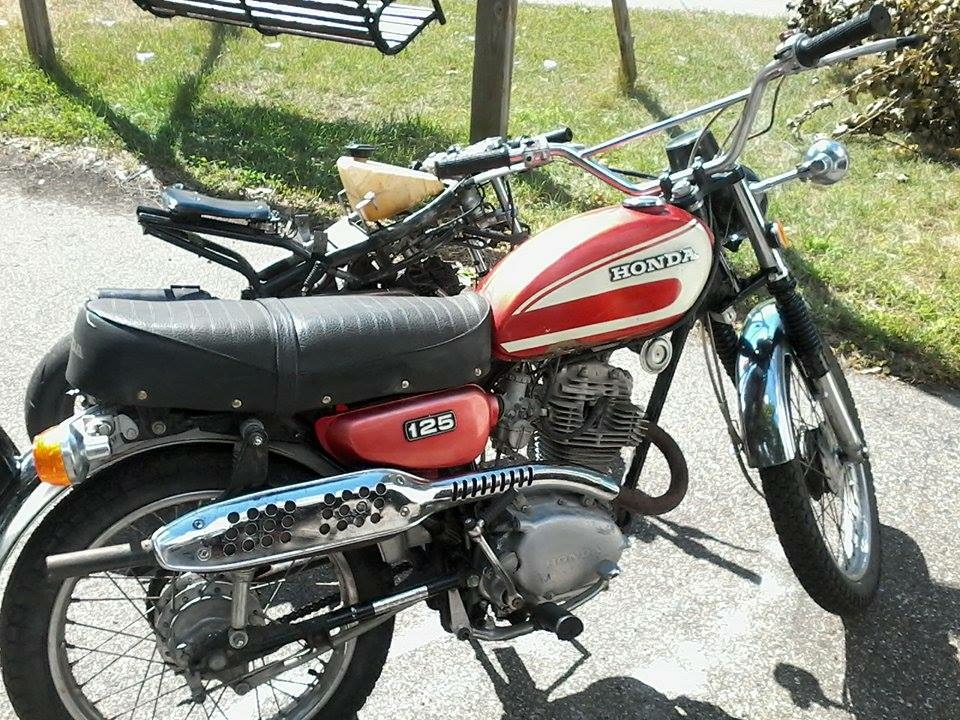
1974 Honda CL125S Scrambler Red.

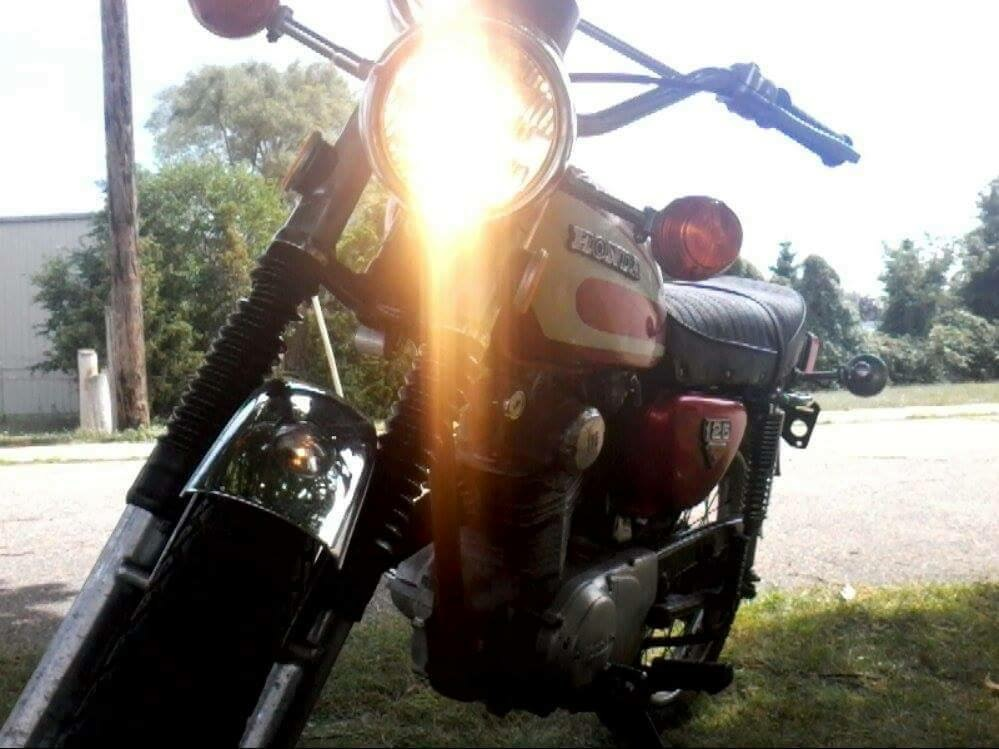
1974 Honda CL125S.
