= Honda CD175 =

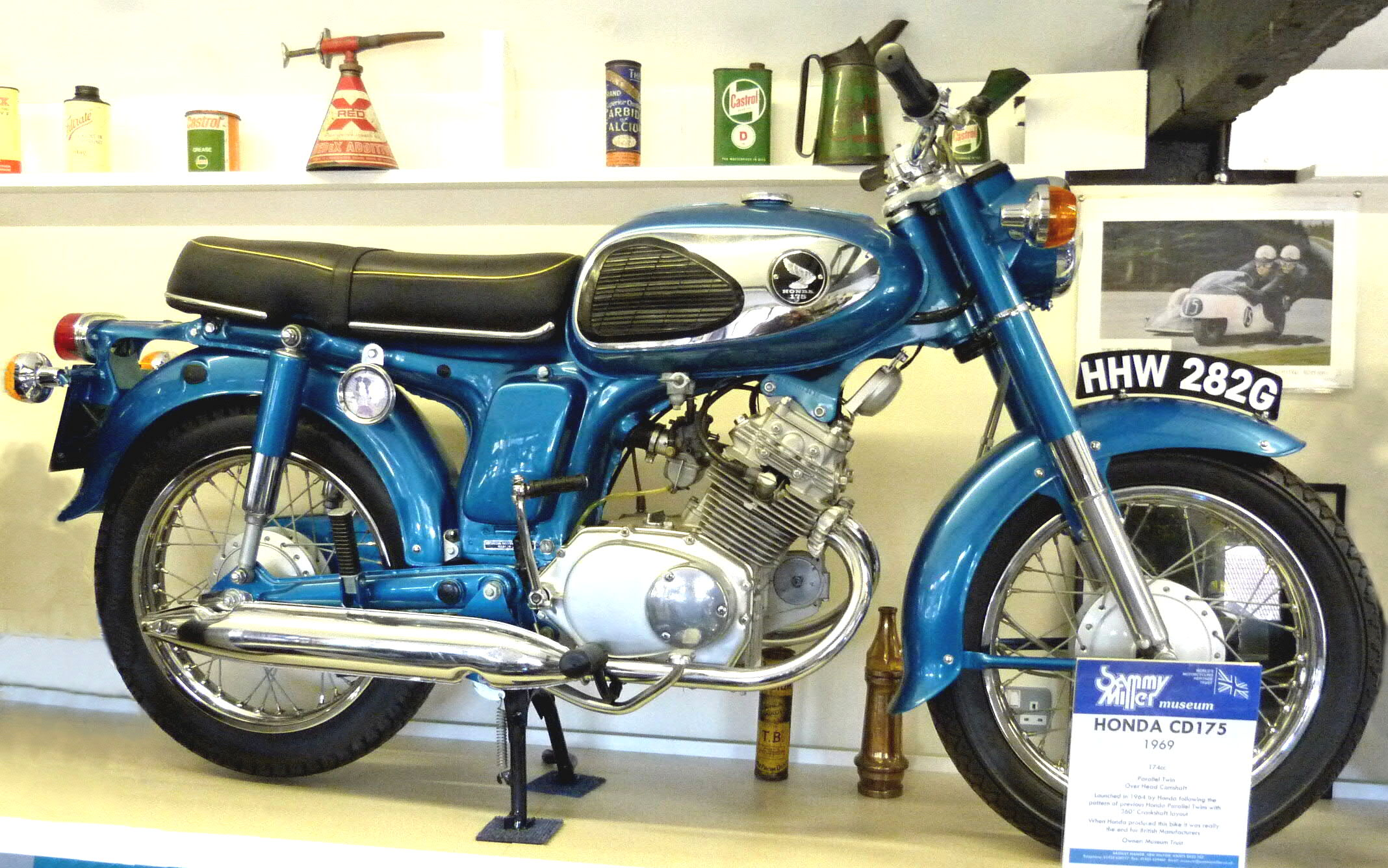
- 1969 Honda CD175 at the Sammy Miller Museum
- Manufacturer: Honda Motor Company
- Production: 1967–1979
- Successor: Honda CD200 RoadMaster
- Class: Standard
- Engine: 174 cc (10.6 cu in) air cooled, inclined twin, centrifugal oil filter
- Compression ratio: 9:1
- Transmission: Four-speed manual, fully enclosed chain final drive
- Frame type: Pressed steel spine
- Suspension: Front; telescopic Rear; swingarm twin shock absorber
- Brakes: Drum front and rear
- Related: Honda CD125; Honda CD185T; Honda CB175

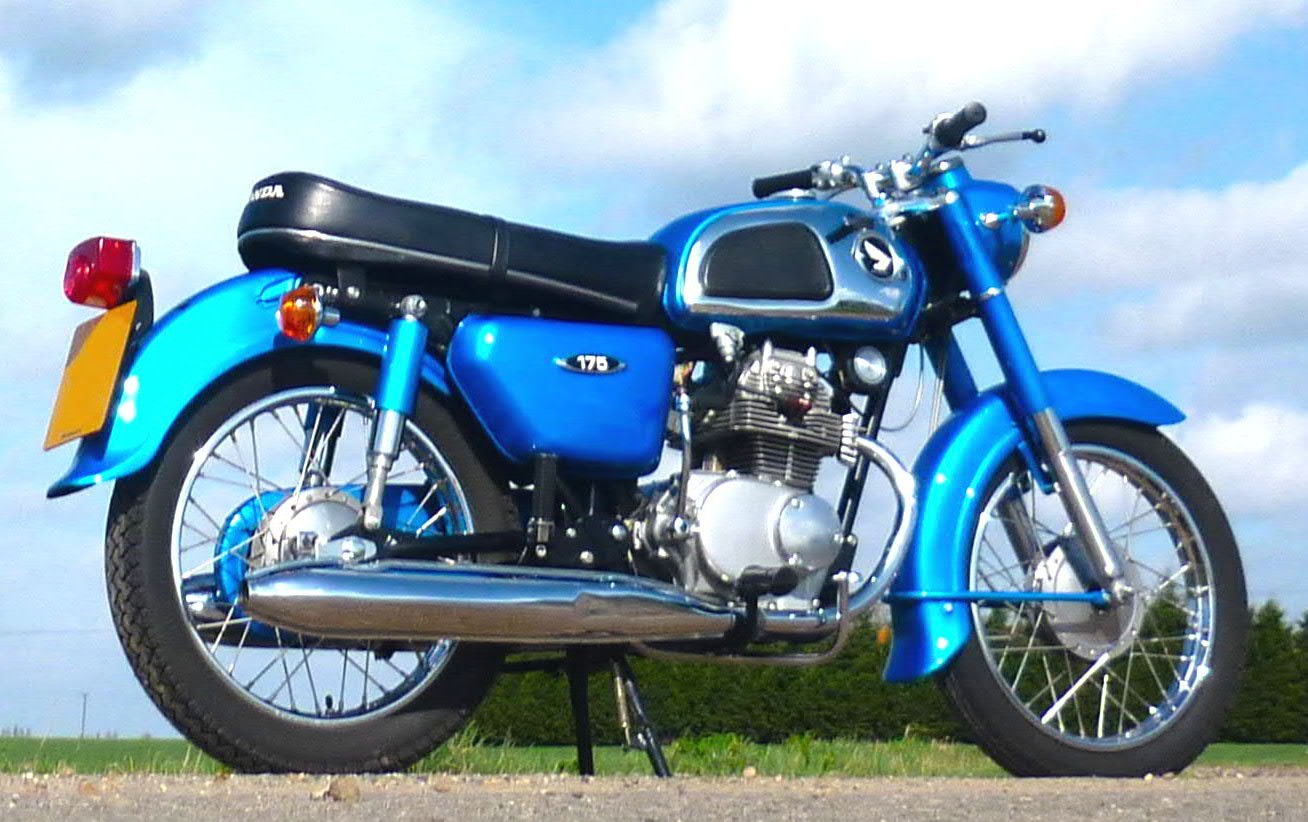
- 1975 Honda CD175
- Manufacturer: Honda Motor Company
- Production: 1970–1979
- Engine: 174 cc (10.6 cu in) air cooled, upright twin
- Bore / stroke: 52 x 41 mm
- Compression ratio: 9:1
- Power: 17 bhp (13 kW) (claimed) at 9,000 rpm
- Transmission: 4-speed manual (1 down 3 up)
- Frame type: Tubular, semi-double cradle
- Brakes: Drum front and rear with full-width hubs in light-alloy
- Tyres: 3.00 x 17
- Seat height: 30
- Weight: 269 lb (122 kg) (dry)
- Fuel capacity: 2 Imperial gallons
- Oil capacity: 3^{1}/_{2} Imperial pints

The Honda CD175 is a 174 cc (10.6 cu in) motorcycle made from 1967 to 1979 by the Honda Motor Company. Described by Honda as a "great new all-rounder, at home around town or putting the highway behind you", it was the touring model in Honda's 175 cc motorcycle lineup that also included the sportier CB175 and the scrambler CL175 version. The CD175 shared some components and design elements in common with other models from Honda including the early-model pressed steel backbone frame, sometimes known as "T bone".

The motorcycle featured an electric starter (except in the United Kingdom), turn signals, deeply valanced mudguards and mirrors. Its inclined air-cooled engine was an evolution of the earlier Honda CB160 powerplant, retaining several components from the CB160, including most of the castings and some internal parts.

== Models ==
1967 models (product code 237) began at serial number CD175-1000001. Also known as the CA175, CD175A, or CD175 K0 just over 17000 of these units were built and distributed worldwide although only to commonwealth countries. Styling and appearance on these early CD models was similar to the larger CB450K0 "Black Bomber", especially the British version which received a set of low-rise handlebars (as well as no electric start and different turn signal positions).

1968 models (also product code 237) began at serial number CD175-10017136 and incorporated changes that allowed for export to the USA. These changes included a different fuel tank with larger, less pointy chrome covers and knee pads, larger more bulbous battery and tool covers, upgraded lighting and signals/switches, and a hybrid welded-tube/stamped frame. The engine remained unchanged from 1967.

1969 "K3" models (product code 302) introduced the vertical engine and all-tube frame and some smaller body work changes that continued until the end of production in 1979.

== Specifications ==
The CD175 had a 360° crankshaft, wasted spark ignition, single carburetor, a parallel twin high revving engine, 16" wheels and a 100 mph (160 km/h) speedometer. Each connecting rod big end had roller bearings. In 1979 it was replaced by Honda CD185.

From 1967 to 1968: the machine had a 4 stroke 360 degree parallel twin; air cooled; single overhead cam (chain driven); cylinders inclined 30 degrees forward from vertical ("sloper" engine) with 9:1 compression ratio; max 17 bhp @ 10,500 rpm. From 1969 to 1979 it had a similar 4 stroke engine but with vertical cylinders ("vertical" engine); max 15 bhp @ 10,000 rpm. Both engines used a single Carburetor. Electrics were 6 volt (battery ignition).
