= Honda Sport 90 =

Type of motorcycle

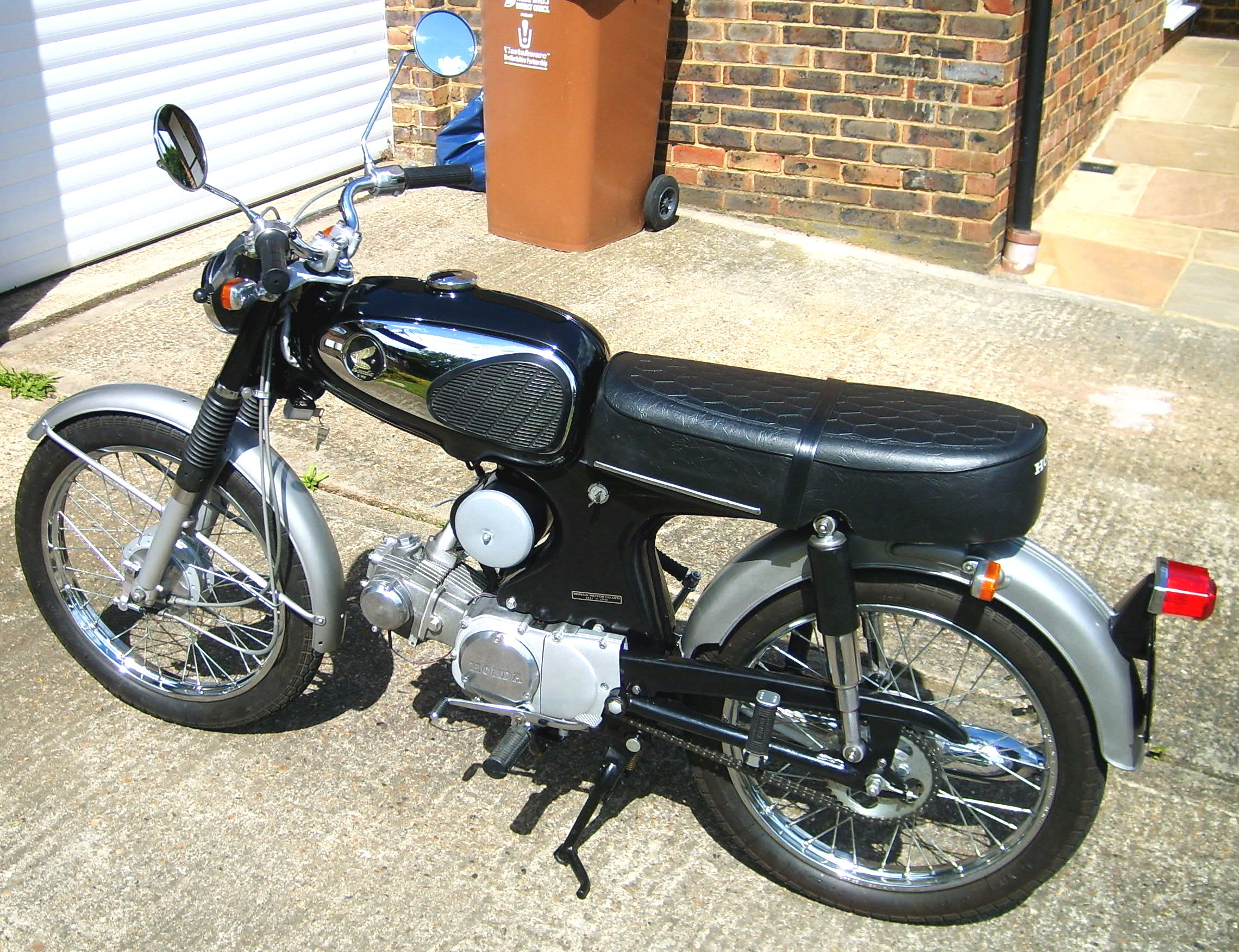
- Manufacturer: Honda
- Also called: Honda S90, Honda CS90, Honda Sport 90, Honda Super 90, Honda Benly 90, S90Z
- Production: 1964 - 1969
- Engine: 89.6 cc (5.47 cu in) SOHC 2-valve 4-stroke, air-cooled
- Transmission: manual 4-speed; chain final drive
- Suspension: Front: telescopic Rear: Swingarm
- Brakes: Front and Rear, Internal Expansion Type (drum)
- Tires: front and rear 2.50-18, 4 ply
- Wheelbase: 1.195 m (3 ft 11.0 in)
- Dimensions: L: 1.89 m (6 ft 2 in); W: 0.65 m (2 ft 2 in); H: 0.98 m (3 ft 3 in)
- Fuel capacity: 7 L (1.5 imp gal; 1.8 US gal)

The Honda Sport 90, Super 90, or S90, is a motorcycle produced by Honda from 1964 to 1969. The Sport 90 was based on the Honda Super Cub and uses an 89.6 cc (5.47 cu in) single-cylinder OHC air-cooled engine.

The engine links to a four-speed manual transmission. There is no tachometer but the speedometer indicates speed ranges for each gear. The top speed was claimed to be 64 mph, and the engine is rated at 8 horsepower.

The engine holds a quart of oil and has an internal centrifugal oil filter, and the exhaust has a removable baffle. A metal cylinder behind the carburetor holds the air filter. Tools go under the seat in their own compartment.

The frame is Pressed Steel rather than Tubular steel to minimize weight and the bike is fitted with telescopic front forks for improved road holding. The motorcycle was not intended for off-road use, as evidenced by the narrow handlebars and street tires; it included no accessories for such travel. 90 miles per US gallon (38 km/L) was not hard to attain, even with spirited riding.

There are a variety of models including the Honda S90, CS90, and the Benly 90. The date of manufacturing can be determined by removing the fuel tank and examining the tag surrounding the wiring harness. Restored versions of the Super 90 continue to be produced, for example the S90Z in Indonesia.

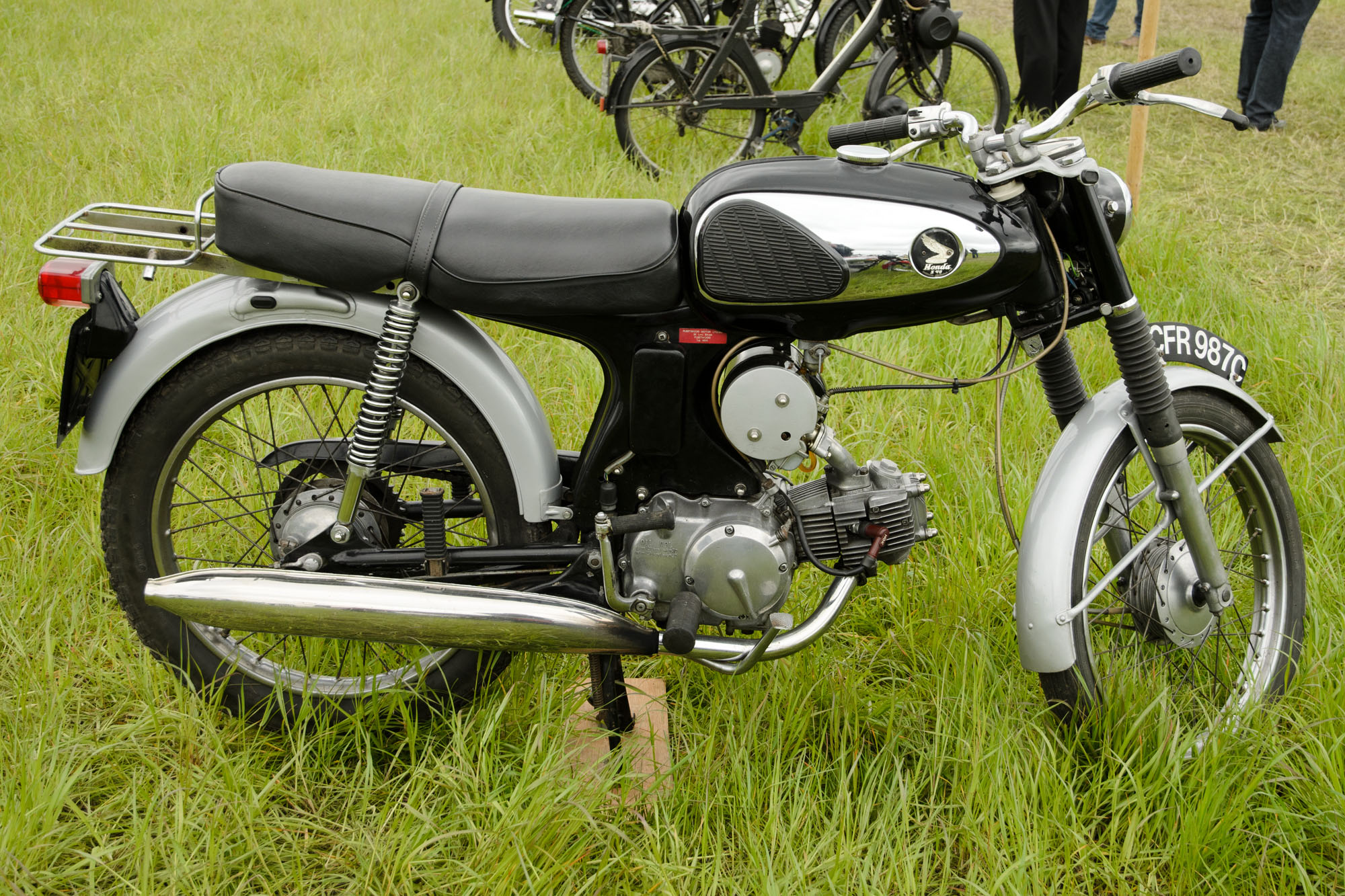

Honda S90 (1965)
