= George Martin (disambiguation) =

Sir George Martin (1926–2016) was an English record producer.

George Martin may also refer to:

== Arts and entertainment ==
=== Actors ===
- George Martin (Spanish actor) (1937–2021), Spanish film actor
- George Martin (American actor) (1929–2010), American television, stage, and film actor
- George André Martin (1910–1957), French actor and variety performer

=== Writers ===
- George R. R. Martin (born 1948), American author of A Song of Ice and Fire (adapted as Game of Thrones)
- George Madden Martin (1866–1946), American fiction writer
- George Victor Martin (1900–1959), American writer

=== Other media ===
- George Martin (comedian) (1922–1991), British comedian, musician, scriptwriter and broadcaster
- George Martin (organist) (1844–1916), organist at St Paul's Cathedral (1888)
- George William Martin (1828–1881), English musical composer
- George Martin, character in the film 84 Charing Cross Road

== Law and politics ==
- George B. Martin (1876–1945), U.S. senator from Kentucky
- George Bohun Martin (1842–1933), English-born farmer, rancher and political figure in British Columbia, Canada
- George Washington Martin II (1876–1948), lawyer and jurist in Brooklyn, New York
- George W. Martin (Missouri politician) (1838–1921), American politician from Missouri
- George Ewing Martin (1857–1948), United States federal judge
- George Martin (Tasmanian politician) (1876–1946), member of the Tasmanian Parliament
- George Martin (Queensland politician) (1858–1905), member of the Queensland Legislative Assembly
- George Martin (Michigan judge) (1815–1867), justice of the Michigan Supreme Court

== Sports ==
=== Cricket ===
- George Martin (Kent cricketer) (1833–1876), English cricketer who played for Kent
- George Martin (Nottinghamshire cricketer) (1845–1900), English cricketer who played for Nottinghamshire
- George Martin (Otago cricketer) (1869–1961), New Zealand cricketer who played for Otago
- George Martin (Hampshire cricketer) (1875–1957), English cricketer who played for Hampshire
- George Martin (Glamorgan cricketer) (1880–1962), Glamorgan cricketer

=== Other sports ===
- George Martin (Gaelic footballer) (1877–1934), Gaelic footballer
- George Martin (Scottish footballer) (1899–1972), Scottish footballer and manager
- George Martin (American football) (born 1953), American football defensive end
- George Martin (footballer, born 1875) (1875–1943), Australian rules footballer for Essendon
- George Martin (footballer, born 1883) (1883–1964), Australian rules footballer for Melbourne
- George Graham Martin (born 1933), South African footballer
- George Martin (rugby league) (1931–2017), New Zealand rugby league footballer
- George Martin (rugby union) (born 2001), English rugby union player
- George Martin (long jumper) (born 1910), American long and triple jumper, 3rd in the triple jump at the 1931 USA Outdoor Track and Field Championships

== Others ==
- George Martin (Royal Navy officer) (1764–1847), Royal Navy admiral of the fleet
- George Willard Martin (1886–1971), American mycologist
- George Martin (priest) (1864–1946), priest in the Church of England
- George Dennis Martin (1847–1915), English architect
- George C. Martin (1910–2003), project engineer for Boeing
- George M. Martin (1927-2022), American biogerontologist
- George Martin, father of Boots and Her Buddies cartoonist Edgar Martin

== See also ==
- Georges Martin (disambiguation)
- George Henry Martin Johnson, hereditary chief of the Mohawk of the Six Nations in Canada
- Moto Martin, founded by Georges Martin
