= CBX =

CBX may refer to:

- CBX (AM), a radio station (740 AM) licensed to Edmonton, Alberta, Canada
- CBX-FM, a radio station (90.9 FM) licensed to Edmonton, Alberta, Canada
- Honda CBX, a six-cylinder motorcycle made by Honda from 1978 to 1982
  - Honda CBX (disambiguation), variations of the motorcycle
- the family of Heterochromatin Protein 1 or "Chromobox Homolog" in molecular biology
- Cross Border Xpress, bridge to and terminal in San Diego at Tijuana Airport
- the IATA code for Condobolin Airport, Australia
- the station code for the Cameron Bridge railway station in Fife, Scotland
- the Cross Bronx Expressway
- Exo-CBX, a subunit of South Korean group Exo
- Caramboxin, a toxin from carambola
- CBX: Canadian Ballroom Extravaganza, 2022 Canadian television series
