= Honda CBX (disambiguation) =

The Honda CBX is a six-cylinder motorcycle made from 1978 to 1982.

Honda CBX may also refer to Honda motorcycles whose model designations begin with the prefix CBX, including:

- Honda CBX750
- Honda CBX400F
- Honda CBX series - about Honda motorcycles prefixed "CBX"
- Honda CBX550F
