= Honda CBX250RS =

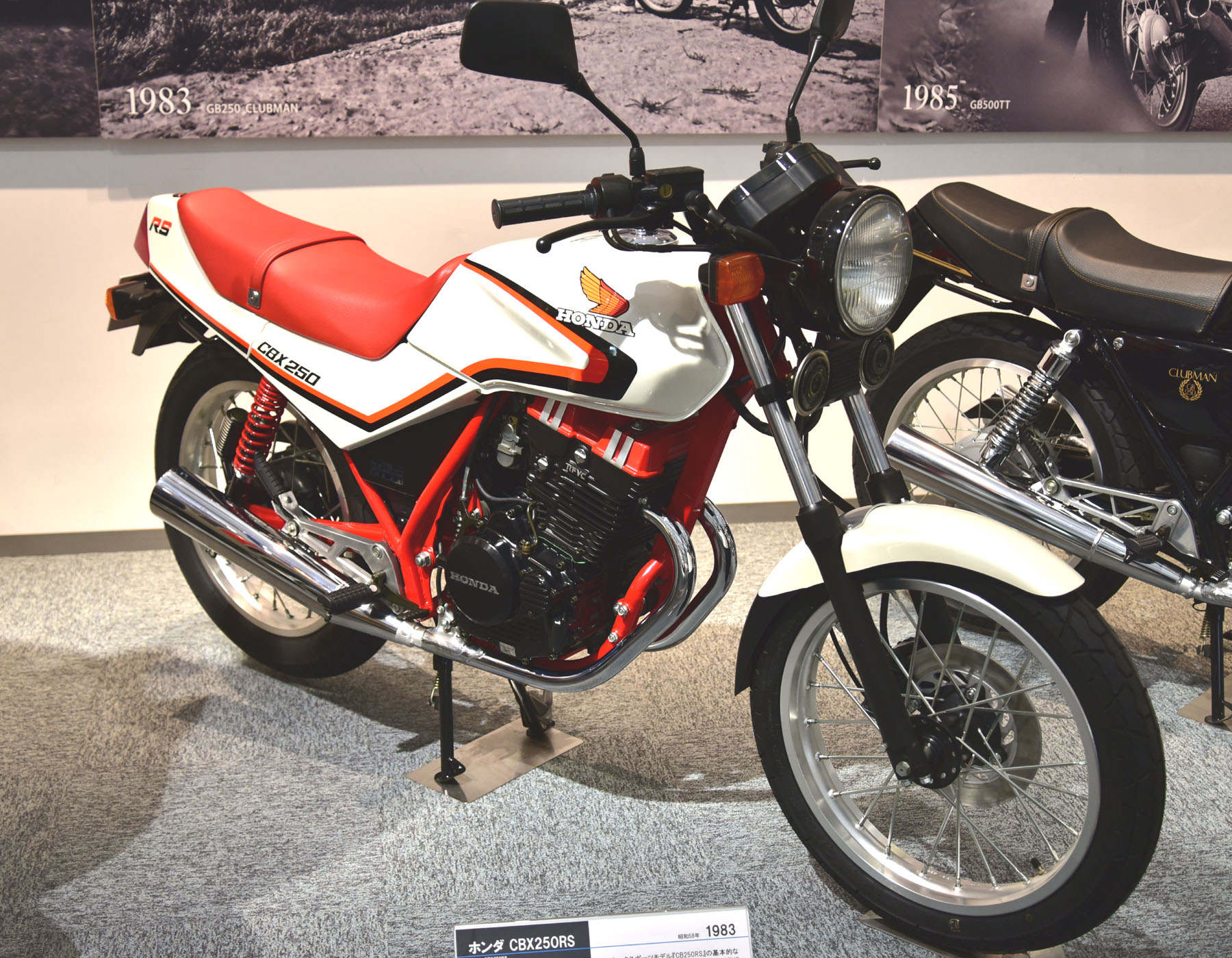
- Manufacturer: Honda
- Production: 1984–1986
- Predecessor: Honda CB250RS
- Engine: 249 cc (15.2 cu in), air-cooled, single
- Bore / stroke: 72 mm × 61.3 mm (2.83 in × 2.41 in)
- Compression ratio: 10.5:1
- Ignition type: CDI
- Transmission: 6-speed, chain drive
- Brakes: Front: disc Rear: drum
- Rake, trail: 98 mm (3.9 in)
- Wheelbase: 1,355 mm (53.3 in)
- Dimensions: L: 2,090 mm (82 in); W: 745 mm (29.3 in); H: 1,060 mm (42 in)
- Seat height: 770 mm (30 in)
- Fuel capacity: 15 L (3.3 imp gal; 4.0 US gal)
- Related: Honda GB250; Honda XR350; Honda CBX250S

The Honda CBX250RS is a motorcycle first sold by Honda in May 1983 in Japan as their new 250cc sports bike with a view to replacing the popular CB250RS. The engine was based on the XR series with particular links to the XR350 bottom end, including a six-speed gearbox and the same oil pump. The stroke is also the same, but the bore reduced to bring the capacity down to 249 cc (15.2 cu in). The balance shaft was also discarded, with the engine instead being rubber mounted. Unlike any other XR engine the top was given two camshafts. The bike was also equipped with dual carburettors, only one of which was equipped with a pilot circuit and which open different amounts depending on how much the throttle is twisted.

The CBX250RS-E was sold in the United Kingdom between 1984 and 1986 with an introductory price of £1398. It proved to be a sales flop, being more expensive than the CB250RS which was still on sale at the time and not being notably better. The release was also tarnished with stories of bikes wearing out camshafts and rockers very quickly. In the end an estimated 300 were sold. The model had stronger sales in Japan but was soon replaced by the GB250 which was styled as a cafe racer; this model was successfully sold in Japan until 2000 with only minor changes, the most notable of which was the move to using a single carburettor.
