= Honda CBX550F =

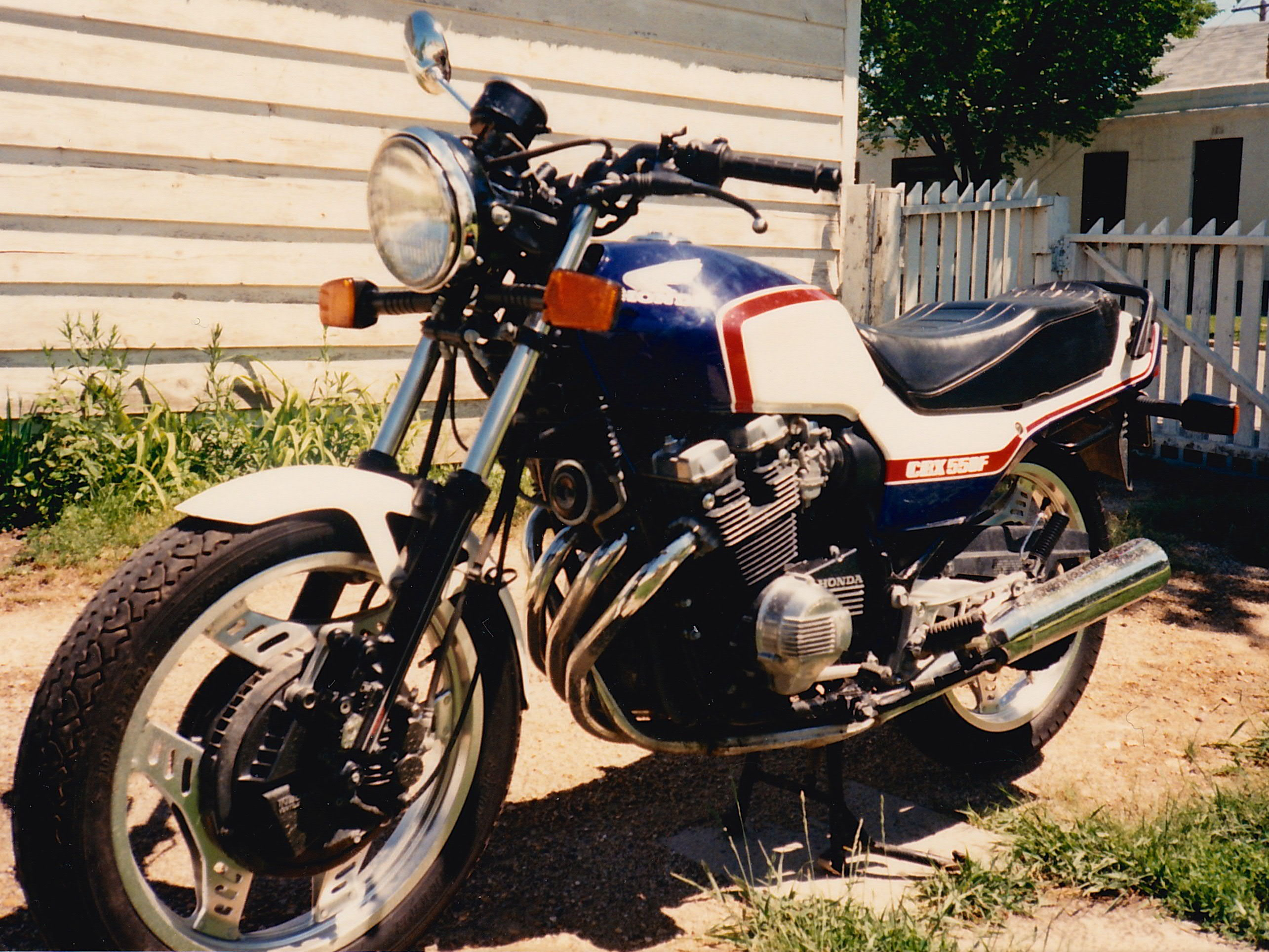
- Manufacturer: Honda Motor Company
- Also called: CBX550 Four
- Production: 1982–1986
- Class: Sport touring
- Engine: 572.5 cc (34.94 cu in) Four stroke in-line four
- Bore / stroke: 59.2 mm × 52.0 mm (2.33 in × 2.05 in)
- Compression ratio: 9.5:1
- Ignition type: Transistorised
- Transmission: 6-speed manual, chain final drive
- Frame type: Duplex cradle; tubular steel
- Suspension: Telescopic with air assistance front: cantilever with air assistance, rear
- Brakes: Front: Twin hydraulic disc Rear: single hydraulic disc
- Tyres: 3.60H18-4PR, front: 4.10H18-4PR, rear
- Wheelbase: 1.380 m (4 ft 6.3 in)
- Dimensions: L: 2.085 m (6 ft 10.1 in); W: 0.740 m (2 ft 5.1 in); H: 1.080 m (3 ft 6.5 in) (F); 1.270 m (4 ft 2.0 in) (F II)
- Seat height: 0.785 m (2 ft 6.9 in)
- Weight: 184 kg (406 lb) (F); 190 kg (420 lb) (F II) (dry)
- Fuel capacity: 17.0 L (3.7 imp gal; 4.5 US gal)
- Oil capacity: 3.0 L (0.66 imp gal; 0.79 US gal)
- Related: Honda CBX1000; Honda CBX750; Honda CBX650; Honda CBX400F; Honda CBX250

The Honda CBX550F is a four-stroke, in line four cylinder, sport tourer motorcycle produced from 1982 to 1986 by the Honda Motor Company. The CBX550F II is identical apart from the addition of a half-fairing.

Although the model was designated 550, the actual capacity was 572.5 cc (34.94 cu in). Honda developed a completely new, unusual design of engine to compete in the middleweight-sector with twin overhead camshafts acting on rockers, having screw-adjusters for clearance which actuated the sixteen valves (four per cylinder).

The engine featured a standard oil-cooler and a distinctive, unusual exhaust system, a first for Honda, with cross-over pipes directly in front of the engine linking cylinders one to four and a separate pair of pipes connecting cylinders two and three. The CV carburettors were of a new type using mixture-enriching internal fuel passages for cold-starts, with careful engineering of the inlet tracts to achieve smooth gasflow.

The machine was noted for its use of inboard ventilated disc brakes, the discs themselves being contained within a "drum" type enclosure. Front suspension was by oil-damped telescopic fork with air assistance and incorporating an anti-dive mechanism in the left fork leg. Rear suspension was by Honda's own "Pro-Link" rising rate system, which allows the suspension forces to vary in accordance with rear wheel movement. The machine was equipped with transistorised ignition and electrics were 12 volt.

== See also ==
- Honda CBX series
- Honda CBX (disambiguation)
