= Georges Martin =

Georges Martin may refer to:

- Georges Martin (freemason) (1844–1916), French doctor, politician and Freemason
- Georges Martin (cyclist) (1915–2010), French racing cyclist
- Georges Martin (engineer) (1930–2017), automotive engineer

== See also ==
- Moto Martin, the company started by the engineer Georges Martin
