= George Graham Martin =

South African soccer player (born 1933)

- Martin playing for South Africa in 1958

Personal information
- Date of birth: 3 September 1933
- Position: Full back

Youth career
- Clyde

Senior career*
Years	Team	Apps	(Gls)
- Western Province
- Marist Brothers
- Durban United
- Cape Town City

International career
- South Africa
- * Club domestic league appearances and goals

George Graham Martin (born 3 September 1933) is a South African former footballer who played as a full back.

Martin started his football career at Clyde juniors under coach Johnny Walker (South African Goalkeeper 1929–1931).

Eddie Firmani, Stuart Leary and Martin played at Clyde and representative Western Province schools, winning numerous cups and awards. At the time of Eddie Firmani and Stuart Leary accepted professional football contracts at Charlton Athletic F.C., but Martin's father refused the contract.

Martin represented Western Province and won Currie Cup titles in 1955 and 1956. Martin was offered a contract with Falkirk F.C., but Martin refused.

He represented the South African national team (then referred to as Springboks) from 1957 to 1959, as a member of the last South African soccer team to tour overseas before South Africa was suspended from FIFA. The team traveled to England on a two-week boat trip aboard the SA Carnarvon Castle. On this tour, Martin made his senior international debut on 16 November 1958, coming on as a replacement in a 3-1 loss to Portugal, at Nacional Lisbon.

On returning home to South Africa, Martin played in the NFL for Marist Brothers, Durban United and Cape Town City.
