= George Martin (Hampshire cricketer) =

English cricketer

Personal information
- Born: 21 November 1873; Swindon, Wiltshire, England
- Died: 25 February 1963 (aged 89); Stratton St Margaret, Wiltshire, England

Domestic team information
- Years: Team
- 1898–1899: Hampshire
- 1899–1902: Wiltshire

Career statistics
Competition	First-class
Matches	4
Runs scored	19
Batting average	9.50
100s/50s	0/0
Top score	6
Balls bowled	470
Wickets	8
Bowling average	40.12
5 wickets in innings	0
10 wickets in match	0
Best bowling	3/64
Catches/stumpings	3/–
- Source: Cricinfo, 11 February 2024

George Martin (21 November 1873 — 25 February 1963) was an English first-class cricketer.

Martin was born at Swindon in November 1873. He made his debut in first-class cricket for Hampshire against Derbyshire at Derby in the 1898 County Championship. He made two further appearances in the 1898 County Championship, before making a final appearance against Warwickshire in the 1899 County Championship. As a bowler, he took 8 wickets in his four matches, at an average of 40.12 and with best figures of 3 for 64. As a lower order batsman, he scored 19 runs with a highest score of 6. Martin later played minor counties cricket for Wiltshire in 1900 and 1901, making eight appearances in the Minor Counties Championship. Martin died in February 1963 at Stratton St Margaret, Wiltshire.
