= Honda CBX400F =

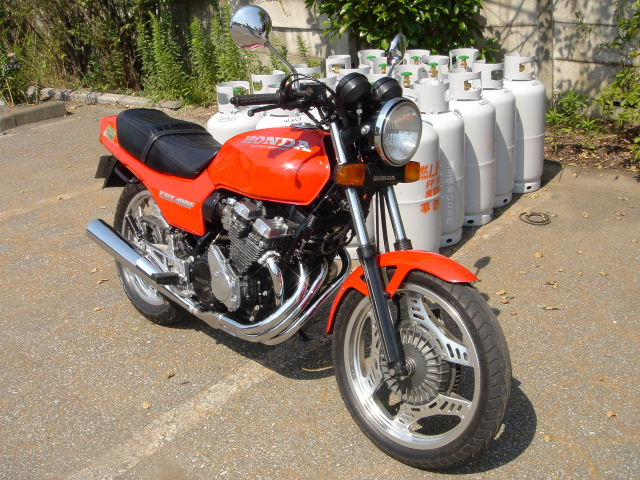
- Manufacturer: Honda
- Production: 1981–1984
- Predecessor: Honda CB400F
- Class: Standard
- Engine: 399 cc (24.3 cu in), DOHC, air-cooled, inline-four, 16-valve
- Compression ratio: 9.8:1
- Power: 48 hp (36 kW) @ 10,500 rpm
- Torque: 33 N⋅m (24 lb⋅ft) @ 9,000 rpm
- Transmission: 6-speed, chain drive
- Suspension: Front: 35 mm Kayaba forks Rear: single air monoshock (Pro-Link)
- Brakes: Front: 229 mm (9.0 in) single disc Rear: 229 mm (9.0 in) single disc
- Tires: Front: 3.60-H18; Rear: 4.10-H18
- Fuel capacity: 17 L (3.7 imp gal; 4.5 US gal)

The Honda CBX400F is a standard motorcycle manufactured by Honda from 1981 to 1984. Powered by a DOHC 16-valve inline-four engine producing 48 horsepower, it was Honda's response to competing 400 cc four-cylinder models from Kawasaki, Yamaha, and Suzuki that had gained popularity in the Japanese domestic market in the early 1980s.

== Background ==
Honda's mid-class sports offerings in the late 1970s used SOHC straight-twin engines, sold in some markets under the Hawk name. In 1979, Kawasaki introduced the Z400FX with an inline-four engine. In 1980, Yamaha and Suzuki entered the segment with the XJ400 and GSX400F, also powered by inline-four engines, increasing competitive pressure on Honda in the 400 cc class.

== CBX400F ==
In 1981, Honda introduced the CBX400F to address demand for an inline-four 400 cc model.

=== Features ===
The CBX400F used a 399 cc (24.3 cu in) air-cooled DOHC 16-valve inline-four engine, fed by four 26 mm Keihin carburetors, with a compression ratio of 9.8:1. Power output was 48 hp (36 kW) at 10,500 rpm and torque was 33 N⋅m (24 lb⋅ft) at 9,000 rpm.

The body design drew on the CB400 Four, and the instrument panel was styled after the CB750F. The chassis used forged separated handlebars, forged footpegs, an X-shaped 4-1-2 exhaust system, and a hollow aluminium swingarm with Pro-Link rear monoshock suspension. Front suspension used 35 mm Kayaba telescopic forks, and braking used 229 mm (9.0 in) single hydraulic disc brakes at both wheels.

=== Integra ===
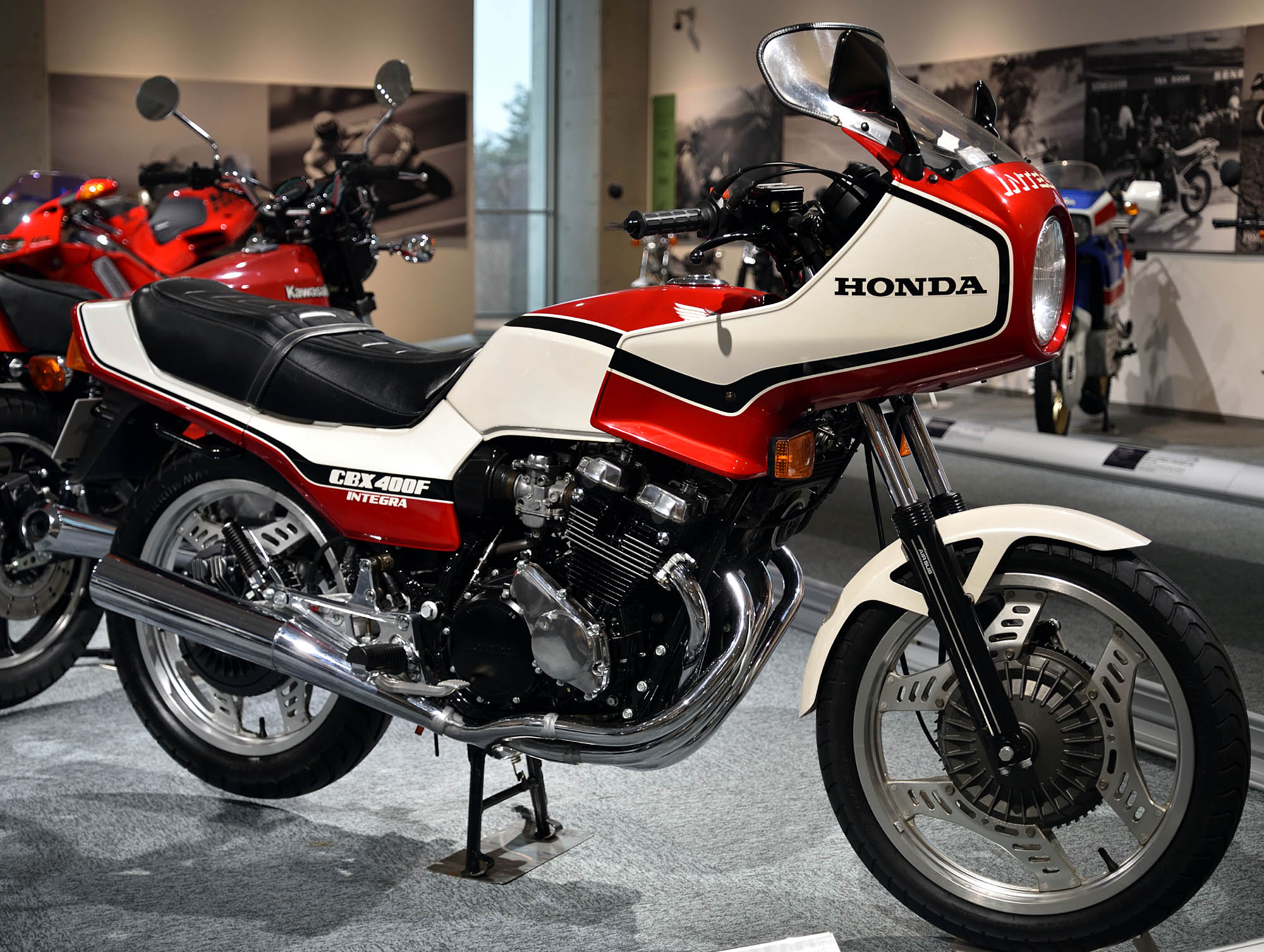
Honda CBX400F Integra

In 1982, Honda introduced the CBX400F Integra variant, equipped with a front fairing and an automatic turn signal cancellation mechanism — the latter a first for a production motorcycle in Japan. A companion Honda CBX550F Integra was launched simultaneously. In 1983, an American-style CBX 400 Custom variant was added to the range.

== CBR400F ==
As the racer replica trend gained popularity in Japan in the early 1980s, production of the CBX400F was wound down in favour of the CBR400F. Continued demand for the CBX400F, which had a character distinct from racer replicas, led Honda to reintroduce it in 1984. The combined production run established a sales record for motorcycles in the over-125 cc class in Japan, which stood until 2003 when it was surpassed by the Yamaha YP400 Majesty.
