= George Martin (Kent cricketer) =

English cricketer

George Martin (11 October 1833 – 21 September 1876) was an English professional cricketer who played for Kent County Cricket Club between 1856 and 1863.

Martin was born at Penshurst in Kent in 1833. He made his first-class cricket debut for Kent against Surrey County Cricket Club at Tunbridge Wells in August 1856. He went on to make a total of 15 appearances in first-class matches for the county, playing for it until 1863.

Martin died at Leigh, Kent in September 1876 aged 42.

== Bibliography ==
- Carlaw, Derek (2020). Kent County Cricketers, A to Z: Part One (1806–1914) (PDF). Cardiff: ACS.
