= George Martin (Nottinghamshire cricketer) =

English cricketer (1845–1900)

George Martin (25 July 1845 — 2 September 1900) was an English cricketer who played for Nottinghamshire. He was born and died in Nottingham.

Martin made his debut first-class appearance in 1870 for Nottinghamshire against Yorkshire, making his debut in the same Nottinghamshire team for which future Test cricketer John Selby was making his first-class debut. Martin scored 15 runs in the match.

Martin made his second and final first-class appearance for an All England XI against Yorkshire, though he was bowled out for a duck in both innings, by future England Test cricketers Allen Hill and George Ulyett respectively.
