= Honda CB250RS =

Honda CB series motorcycle

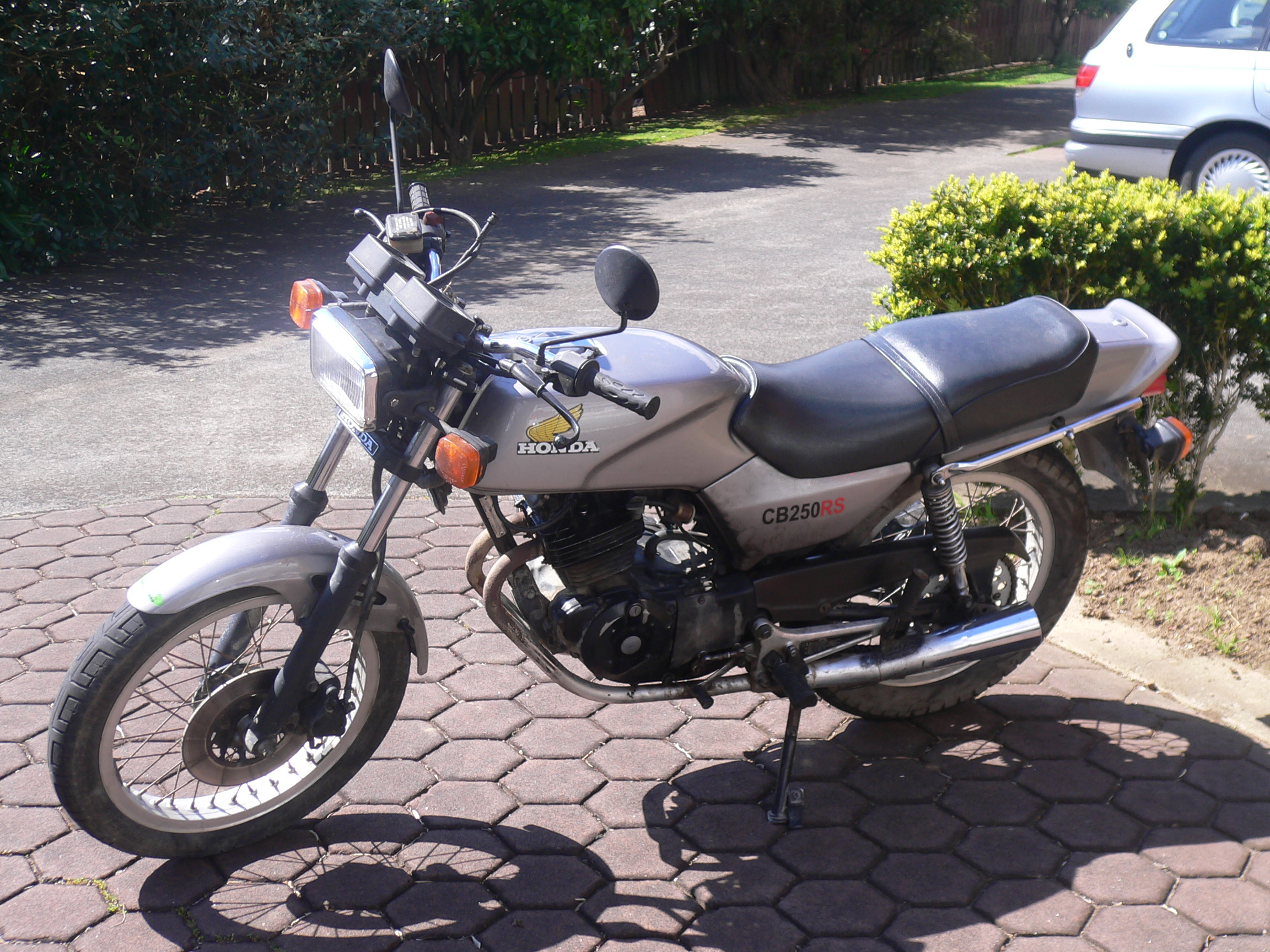
1984 Honda CB250RS

The Honda CB250RS is a 250cc motorcycle designed for road use. It was produced until the mid-1980s. It has a high-compression four-stroke, four-valve, air-cooled, one-cylinder engine, which was an upgrade of the engine built for the earlier XL250S trail bike. The RS is known for its slim build, with a dry weight of only 128 kg, and nimble handling. The engine featured counter rotating balancers, which reduced vibration and allowed a lighter frame. Further weight savings were achieved by making the engine a stressed component. Early models were kick-started (with an automatic decompression lever), while later Deluxe models (designated RS-D / RSZ) came with electric start and different paintwork. The bike has a front disc brake and rear drum brake, and while it had only a single-cylinder, it had twin exhausts; one for each port.

The engine generates modest power and achieves a top speed of around 136 km/h or 84 mph. Early models produced a claimed 26 hp, while later twin-cam models claimed 33 hp. It claimed fuel efficiency of up to 70 mpg (3.4 L/100 km). Known issues include failed ignition coils and CDIs although this is rare, even at 40-plus years old. Lack of battery cranking power can be an issue with the RS-D as the battery has not been upgraded and uses the same 9 amp battery. The starter system suffers as a result, compounded by the poor design of the actual starter. Other problems include cam/head wear, usually caused by lack of oil and filter screen changes. Very high mileage hard-used bikes can crack the head between valves, but in general, with good servicing, these bikes can see 60 to 80,000 miles often.
