= Honda CBX series =

Motorcycles built by Honda

The CBX Prefix has been used by a number of motorcycles built by Honda.

== CBX 1000 ==
The CBX1000 is a sought-after collectible. It started life as an unfaired "sports" bike. Honda later added a fairing, retuned the engine, changed the suspension, and the bike was reclassified as a sports tourer.

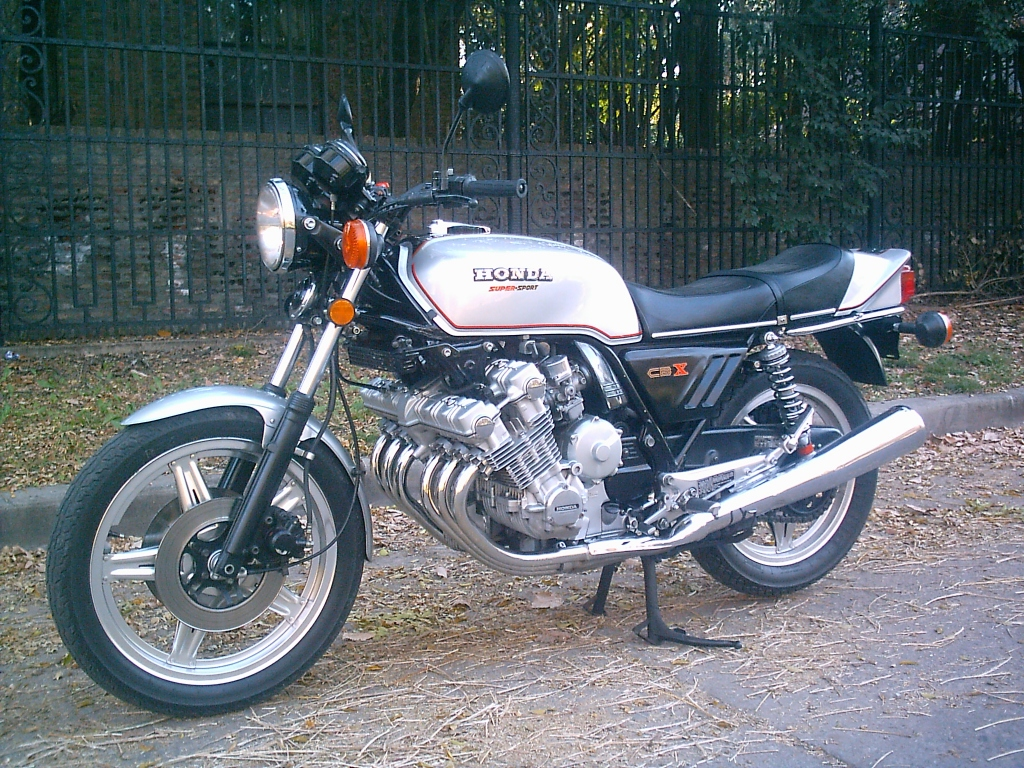
1978 Honda CBX 1000

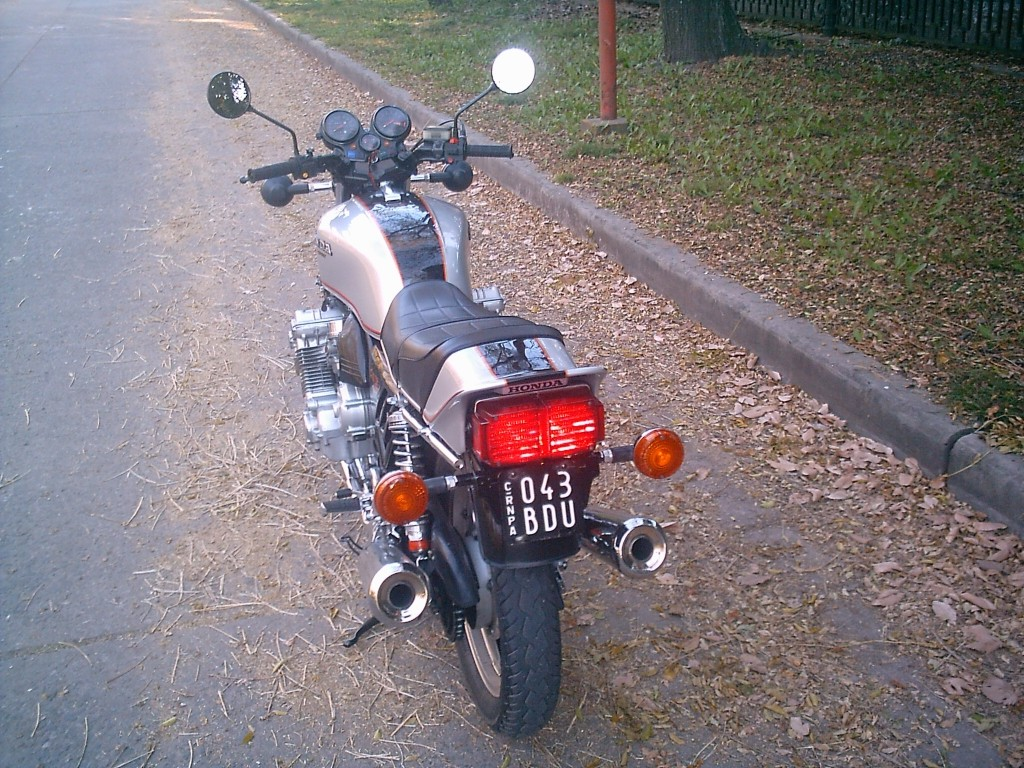
1978 Honda CBX 1000

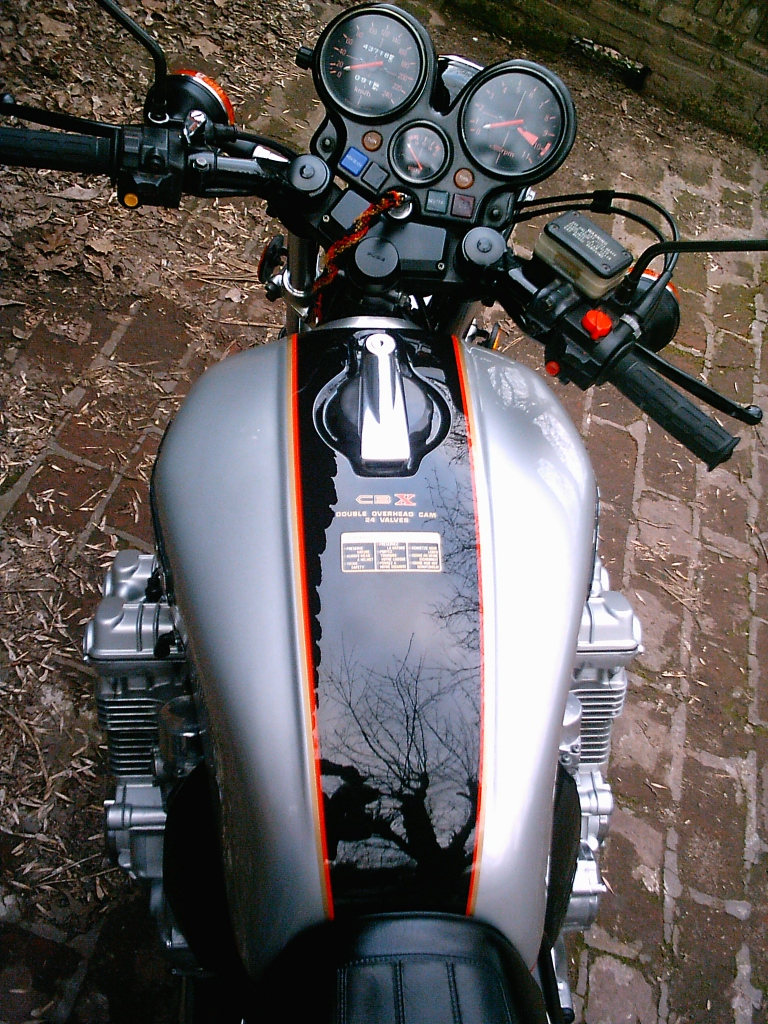
1978 Honda CBX 1000

== CBX 250 ==
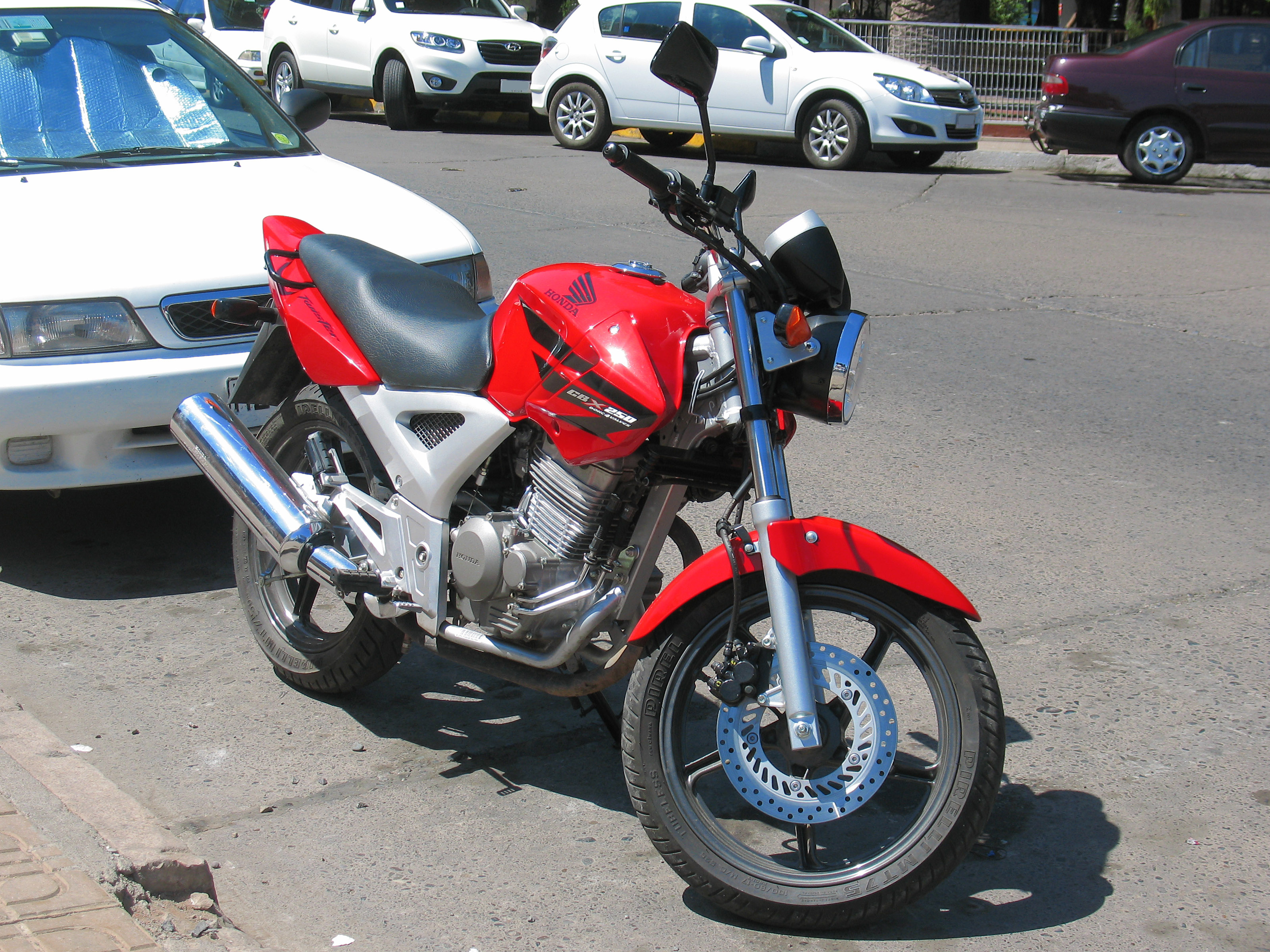
2011 Honda CBX 250

The CBX 250 is a motorcycle that has been manufactured and sold in Brazil since 2001.

Better known as the Twister in South America, it replaced the CBX 200 Strada that finished production in 2002. The Twister is also sold in Argentina, Mexico and South Africa, and is exported to Europe and Australia under the name CBF250.

== Other models ==
Also available were the DOHC four-cylinder 16-valve CBX750, CBX650, CBX550, CBX400 and the single-cylinder CBX250. The CBX550 and CBX400 featured inboard disc brakes that were designed to mitigate problems caused by wet-weather braking. The CBX550 had two internally ventilated cast iron disks up front with inside-out dual piston calipers and a single enclosed disk system in the rear. The very similar CBX400 made do with an enclosed single disc in the front. The enclosed disc brake was also used on some models of the VTR250 and the VF400. The system was less accessible for servicing than conventional disc brakes and there were also reports of heat dissipation problems. Modern braking materials have since rendered any improvement obsolete. The CBX750, CBX550 and CBX400 also featured Honda's rising-rate Pro-Link mono-shock rear suspension design and were available in standard and half-faired versions. The CBX250 was not imported into the US, and was imported for only one year in Canada. It is thought that 6-7 were imported to New Zealand but documentation is difficult to acquire.
