= Honda CBX =

Sports motorcycle manufactured from 1978 to 1982

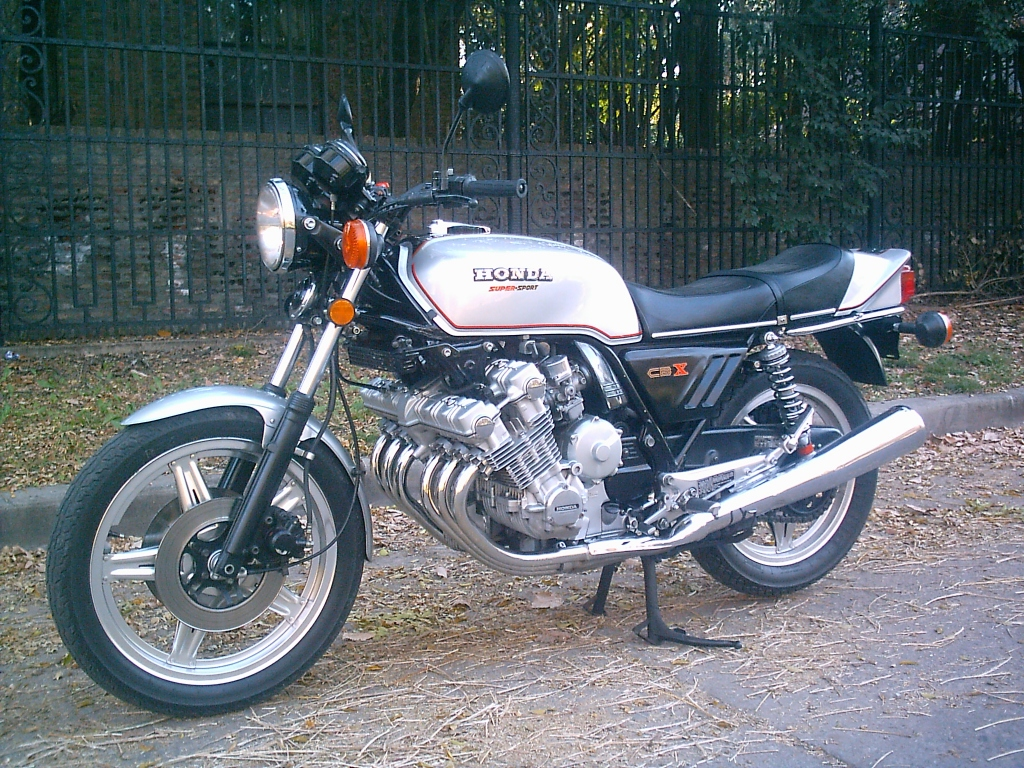
- Manufacturer: Honda
- Production: 1978–1982
- Class: Superbike
- Engine: 1,047 cc (63.9 cu in), 24-valve, twin-cam, air-cooled, transverse inline six with six carburetors
- Bore / stroke: 64.5 mm × 53.4 mm (2.54 in × 2.10 in)
- Compression ratio: 9.3:1
- Top speed: 134–140 mph (216–225 km/h)
- Power: 105 hp (78 kW) @ 9,000 rpm (claimed) 1978–1980; 100–103 hp (75–77 kW) (claimed) 1981–1982; 98 hp (73 kW) (rear wheel)
- Torque: 63 lb⋅ft (85 N⋅m) @ 8,000 rpm(claimed)
- Transmission: 5-speed
- Suspension: Front: 35 mm telescopic fork Rear: twin shock
- Brakes: Front: twin disc brakes 280 mm (11 in); Rear: disc 305 mm (12.0 in)
- Tires: Front 3.5 x 18" rear 4.25 x 18"
- Rake, trail: 27.5°, 4.7 in (120 mm)
- Wheelbase: 1,495 mm (58.9 in)
- Dimensions: L: 2,220 mm (87 in); W: 780 mm (31 in); H: 1,145 mm (45.1 in)
- Seat height: 810 mm (32 in)
- Weight: 246.7 kg (544 lb) (dry); 272 kg (600 lb) (wet)
- Fuel capacity: 20 L (4.4 imp gal; 5.3 US gal)
- Fuel consumption: 6.00 L/100 km; 47.1 mpg_{‑imp} (39.2 mpg_{‑US})

The Honda CBX sports motorcycle was manufactured by Honda from 1978 to 1982. With a 1047cc transverse six-cylinder engine producing 105 bhp (78 kW), it was the flagship of the Honda range. The CBX was well received by the press, but was outsold by its sibling introduced in late 1979, the Honda CB900F.

== Engine characteristics ==
Honda had produced a Honda RC series six-cylinder race bike in the mid-1960s, but the CBX was Honda's first production 6 cylinder road bike with this GP racing engine technology. The CBX's advanced DOHC 24-valve inline six-cylinder engine was its outstanding feature; but in other respects the bike was conventional, having telescopic forks, a tubular frame, twin rear shocks and straight handlebars.

Although bulky, it was only two inches wider than a CB750. The width across the crankshaft was relatively narrow as the CBX had a stacked engine accessory arrangement, whereby the alternator and ignition items were positioned behind the cylinder block. This arrangement produced an acceptable engine width low down and moved critical items out of harm's way in the event of grounding.

Journalist L. J. K. Setright wrote of the CBX's width: "Don't tell me that its engine is too wide: It is no wider than the legs of a rider, so it adds nothing to the frontal area, and personally I would rather have my legs shielded by a cylinder apiece than exposed to every blow ..."

=== Sport touring model ===
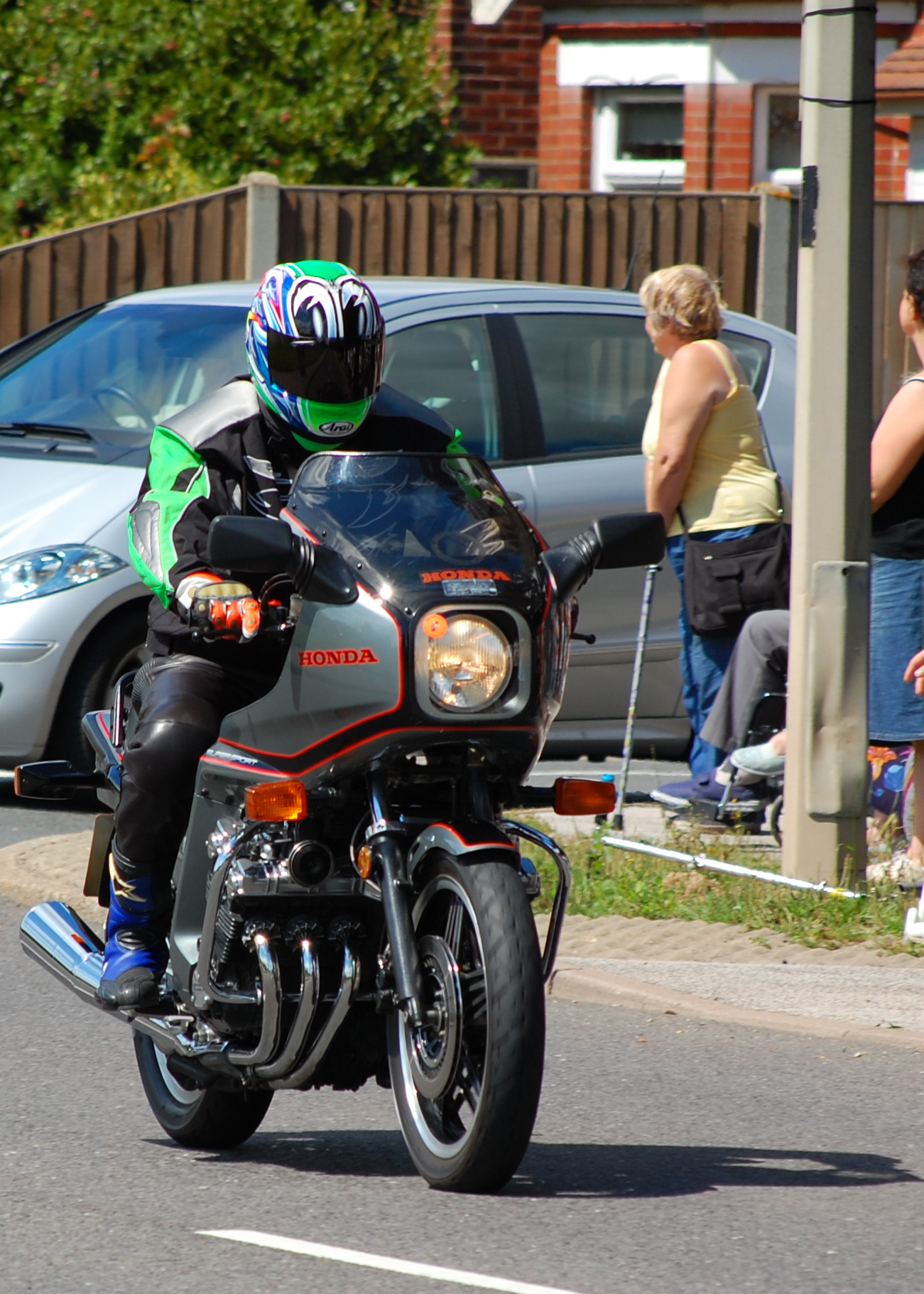
Sport touring model

In 1981, Honda repositioned the CBX into the sport touring category with the CBX-B, detuning the engine to 98 hp (73 kW) and adding Pro-Link monoshock rear suspension, air-adjustable 39 mm front forks, a fairing and optional panniers with a stronger frame to support these additions. The CBX was given ventilated dual front brake discs due to the increased weight. The 1982 model CBX-C model differed little from the 1981 model, having only some changes to paint and trim.

== Reception ==
In the February 1978 issue of Cycle, editor Cook Neilson wrote this of a review of a pre-production bike after a four-day review at Orange County Raceway, Willow Springs Raceway, and the Webco dynamometer: "The objective - to build the fastest production motorcycle for sale anywhere in the world - has been met." Comparing the CBX to the CB900F, Setright added,"The CBX feels better and goes better, and the difference is greater than the difference in price, so the costlier bike is actually the better bargain. ... The CBX engine is as responsive as a racer, the nicest cycle motor to ever reach the street.".

The CBX was pre-dated by the six-cylinder 1972–1978 Benelli 750 Sei based on the Honda CB500 Four, but it was the latest and most advanced entry into the competitive superbike market. A review in Cycle magazine called the CBX a "breakthrough for the Japanese motorcycle industry" and praised its design, concept, and performance. The CBX was available on the market in late 1978, and the production model was even faster than the prototype. Cycle World got a tested 1/4 mile time of 11.64 seconds at 117.95 mph (189.82 km/h), the 1978 bike was also the first bike they tested to go over 130 mph (210 km/h). The 1979 CBX could cover a quarter mile in 11.36 seconds with a terminal speed of 117.95 mph (189.82 km/h). But later CBXs with the addition of saddlebags and a fairing were detuned, and showed the 1981 CBX had lost five hp compared to the 1978 model, from 105 hp down to 100 hp.

Cycle Guide praised the bike as "the Vincent Black Shadow of 1979" upon its introduction. In 2011, Australian publication 2 Wheels Magazine named the CBX as one of their favourite 12 superbikes ever.

To avoid confusion with Honda CBX series bikes, the CBX is sometimes referred to as the CBX1000.

Honda CBX

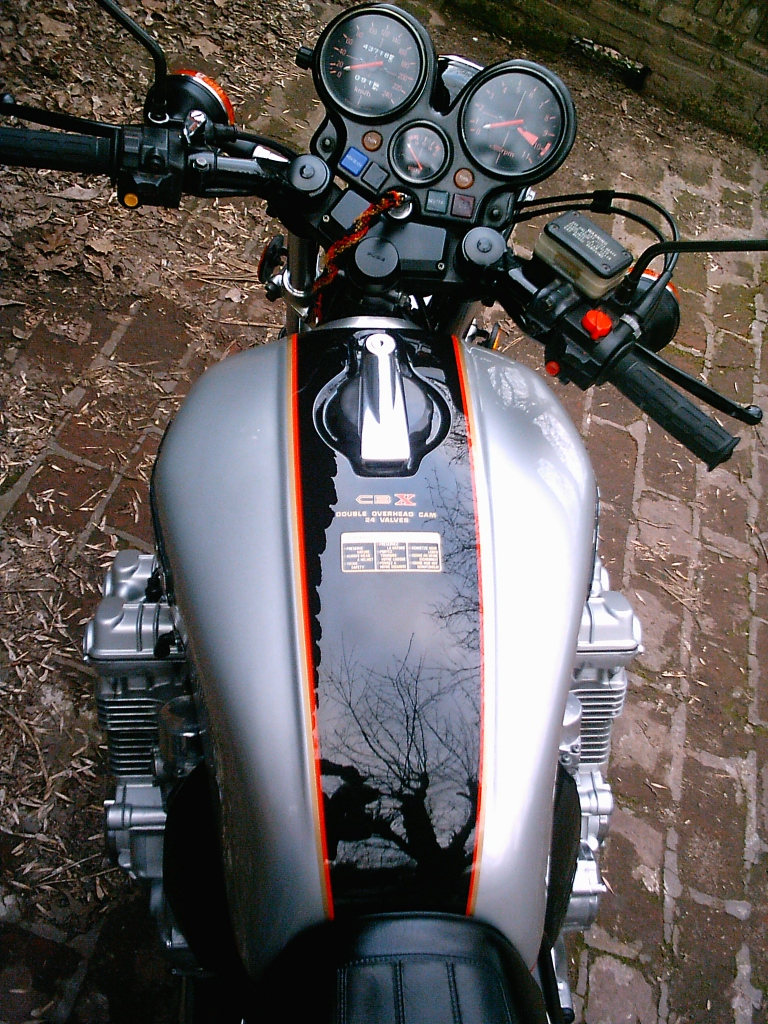

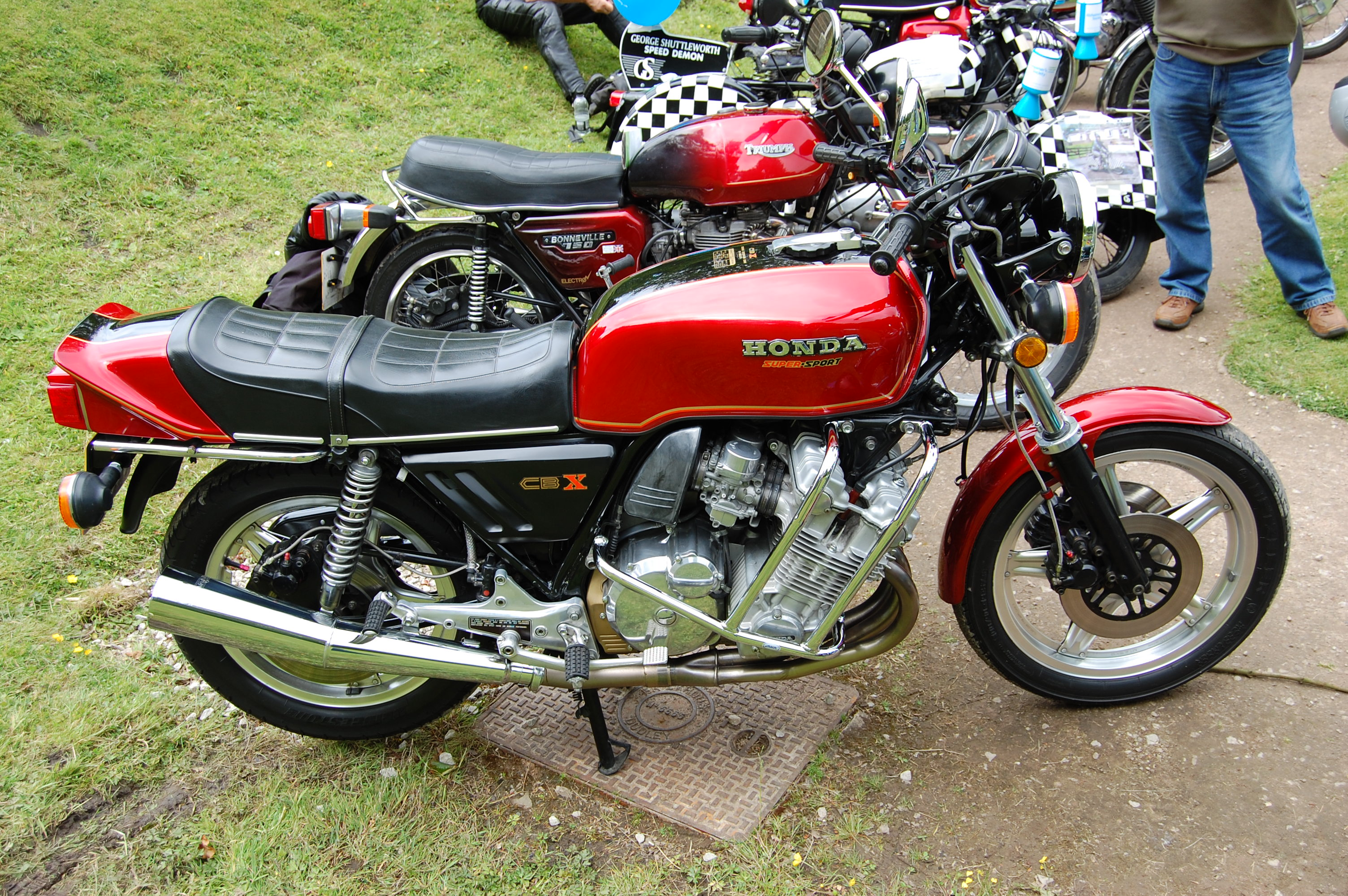

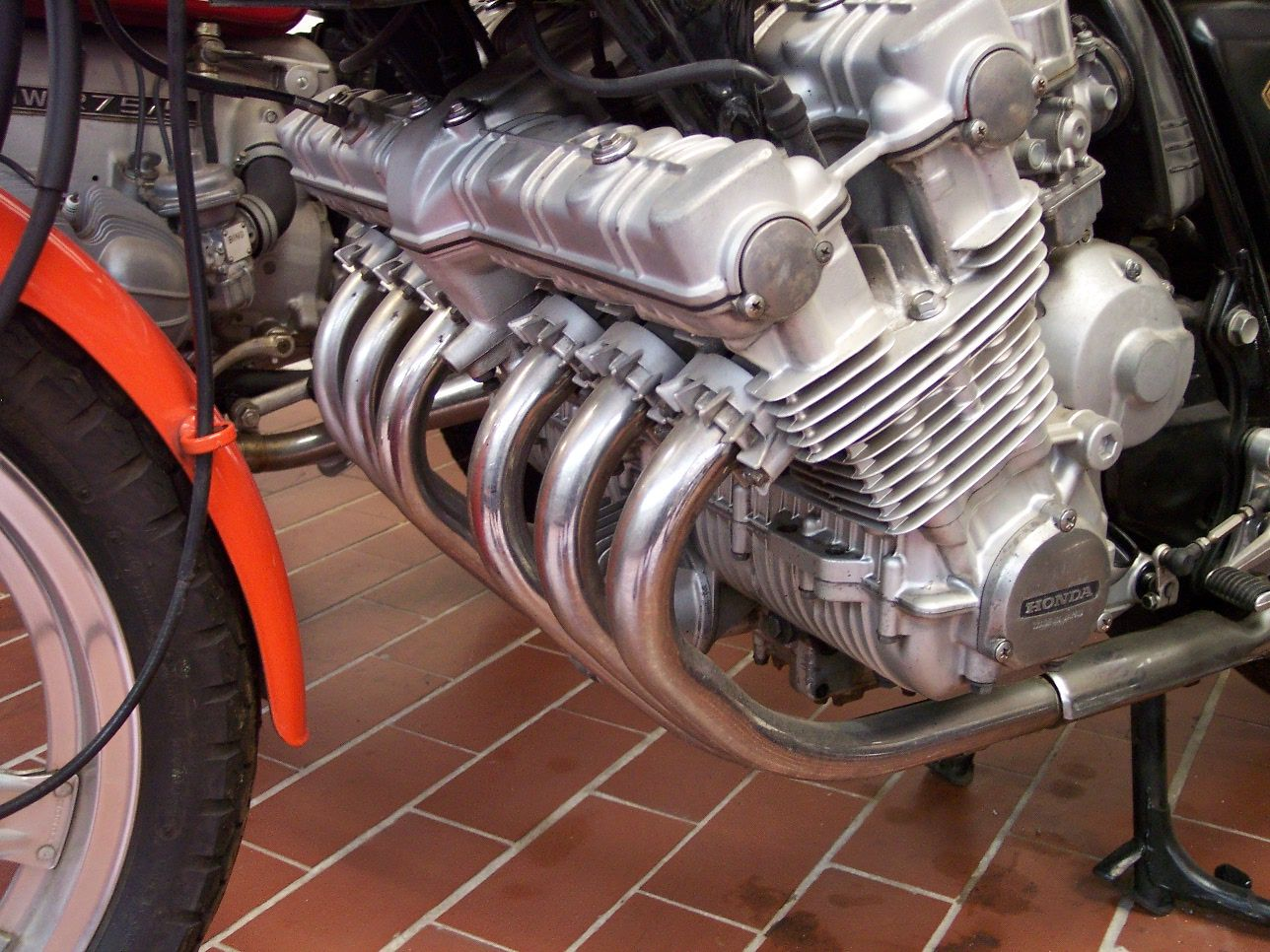

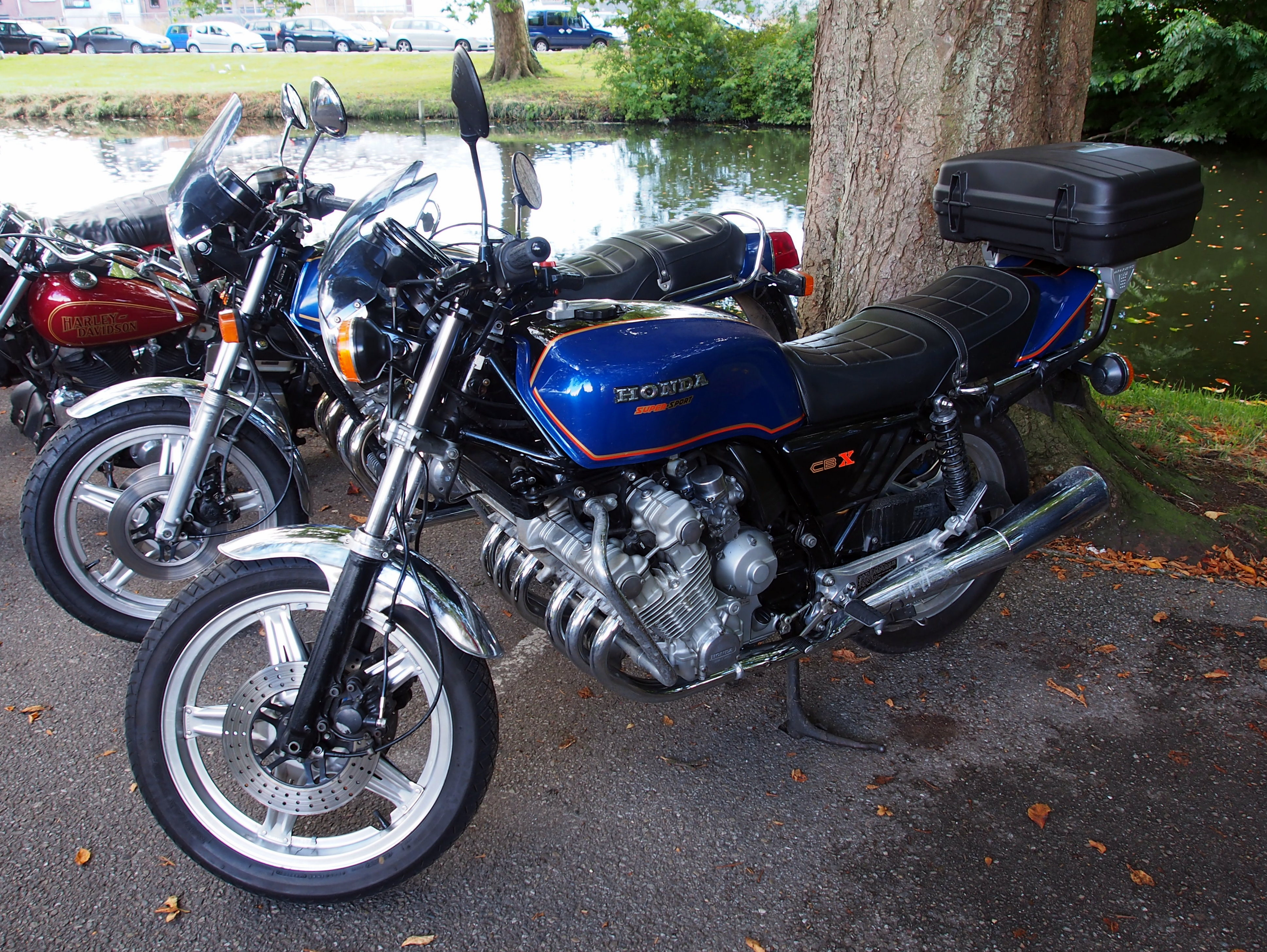

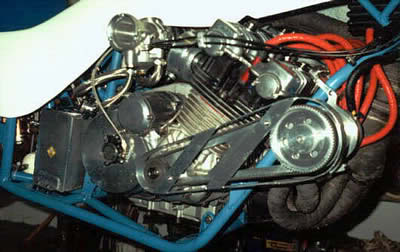
CBX 1320 cc Funnybike drag racing engine

== Moto Martin CBX ==
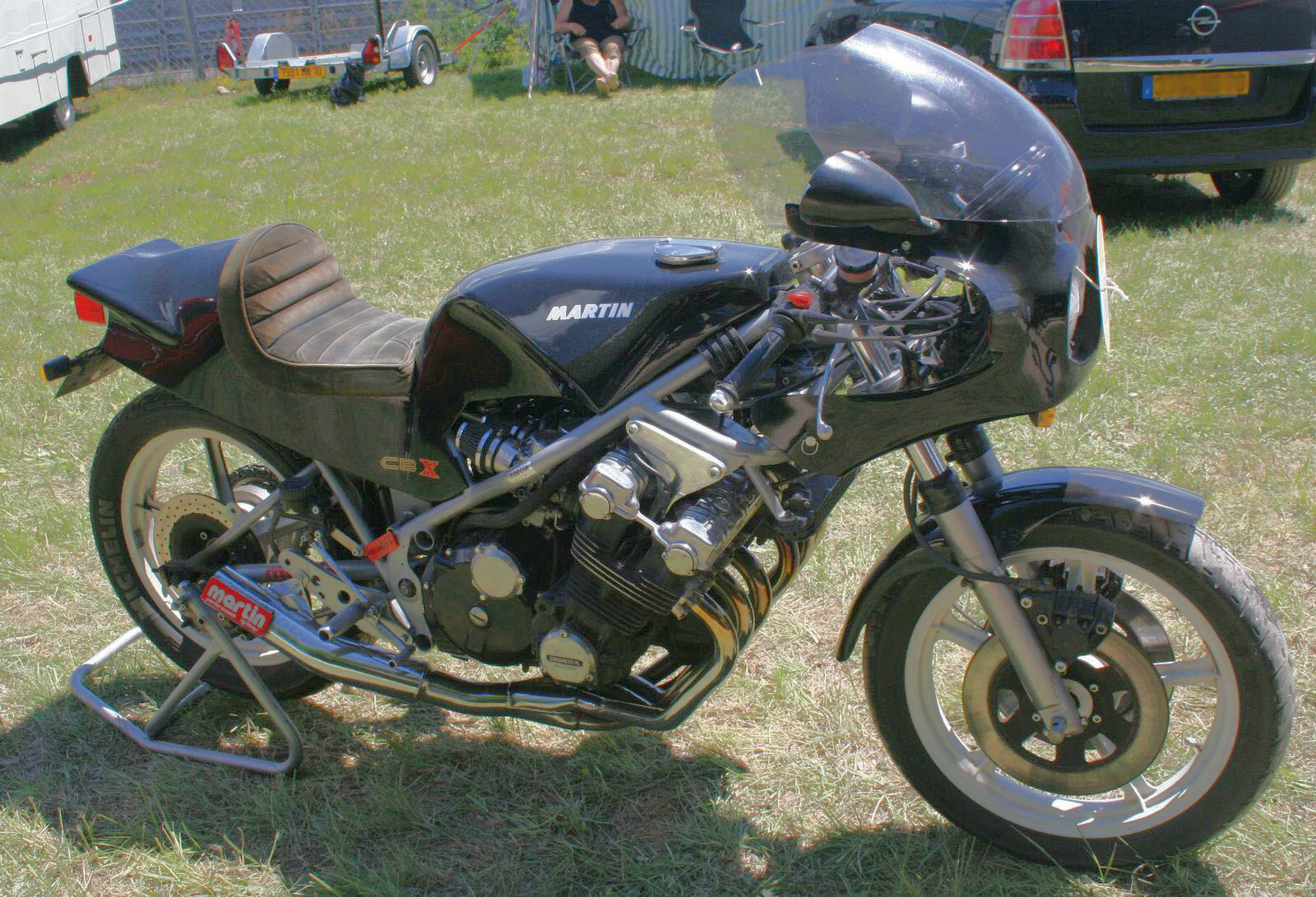
Moto Martin-framed CBX with single seat - a dual seat option was introduced from 1983

In 1980, Frenchman Georges Martin of the French firm Moto Martin designed and built a lighter and stiffer nickel tube frame capable of controlling the CBX motor, and supplied this chassis in kit form.

The original bike had handling issues if ridden hard and was heavy at 580 lb (260 kg). The Moto Martin addressed the handling problems by creating a new rolling chassis. The new frame was stiffer and lighter than the original and the stock 37mm fork stanchions were replaced by 42mm versions in Moto Martin forks. A single, rear monoshock was mounted horizontally under the seat. With Brembo brakes and a one piece fiberglass tank/seat/tail section, the overall weight was reduced by 80 lb (36 kg).

UK journal Motorcycle News listed the Martin CBX as third-fastest in their table of road test statistics in 1980, with a top speed of 142.9 mph (230.0 km/h), bettered by two different models of Dunstall Suzuki.

== Bibliography ==
- Kuch, Joachim: Honda. Motorräder seit 1970. (in German) Stuttgart: Motorbuch-Verlag, 2000, ISBN 3-613-02061-0, pp. 50–51.
- Limpf, Martin: Das Motorrad. Seine technische und geschichtliche Entwicklung dargestellt anhand der einschlägigen Fachliteratur. (in German) München: R. Oldenbourg Verlag, 1983, ISBN 3-486-27571-2, pp. 59–63.
- Foster, Ian: The CBX Book, parts 1 and 2.

== See also ==
- List of Honda engines
