= George Martin (footballer, born 1883) =

Australian rules footballer

Personal information
- Full name: George Allan Martin
- Born: 27 July 1883; Gisborne, Victoria
- Died: 25 November 1964 (aged 81); Belmont, Victoria

Playing career^{1}
Years	Club	Games (Goals)
1908	Melbourne	2 (2)
- ^{1} Playing statistics correct to the end of 1908.

George Allan Martin (27 July 1883 – 25 November 1964) was an Australian rules footballer who played for Melbourne in the Victorian Football League (VFL).
