= George Martin (Glamorgan cricketer) =

English cricketer

George Martin (1 May 1880 – 29 September 1962) was an English cricketer who played for Glamorgan.

Martin, who played club cricket for Penarth, made a single first-class appearance for Glamorgan during the 1921 season – having played for them in a non-first-class match eight years previously. He scored 2 runs in the match and took bowling figures of 1-77, as Glamorgan lost the match by an innings margin.
