= George Martin (Otago cricketer) =

New Zealand cricketer (1869–1961)

George Alexander Martin (3 May 1869 – 24 February 1961) was a New Zealand cricketer who played a single first-class match for the Otago cricket team during the 1908–09 season.

Martin was born at Napier in the Hawke's Bay region in 1869. He worked as a tailor. His only senior cricket match was against Hawke's Bay in January 1909, one of only six first-class matches played in New Zealand during the 1908–09 season. Batting last in Otago's first innings, he scored five runs in the only innings in which he batted.

Martin died at Dunedin in 1961. He was aged 91.
