= Yamaha YP400 Majesty =

Yamaha Majesty YP 400
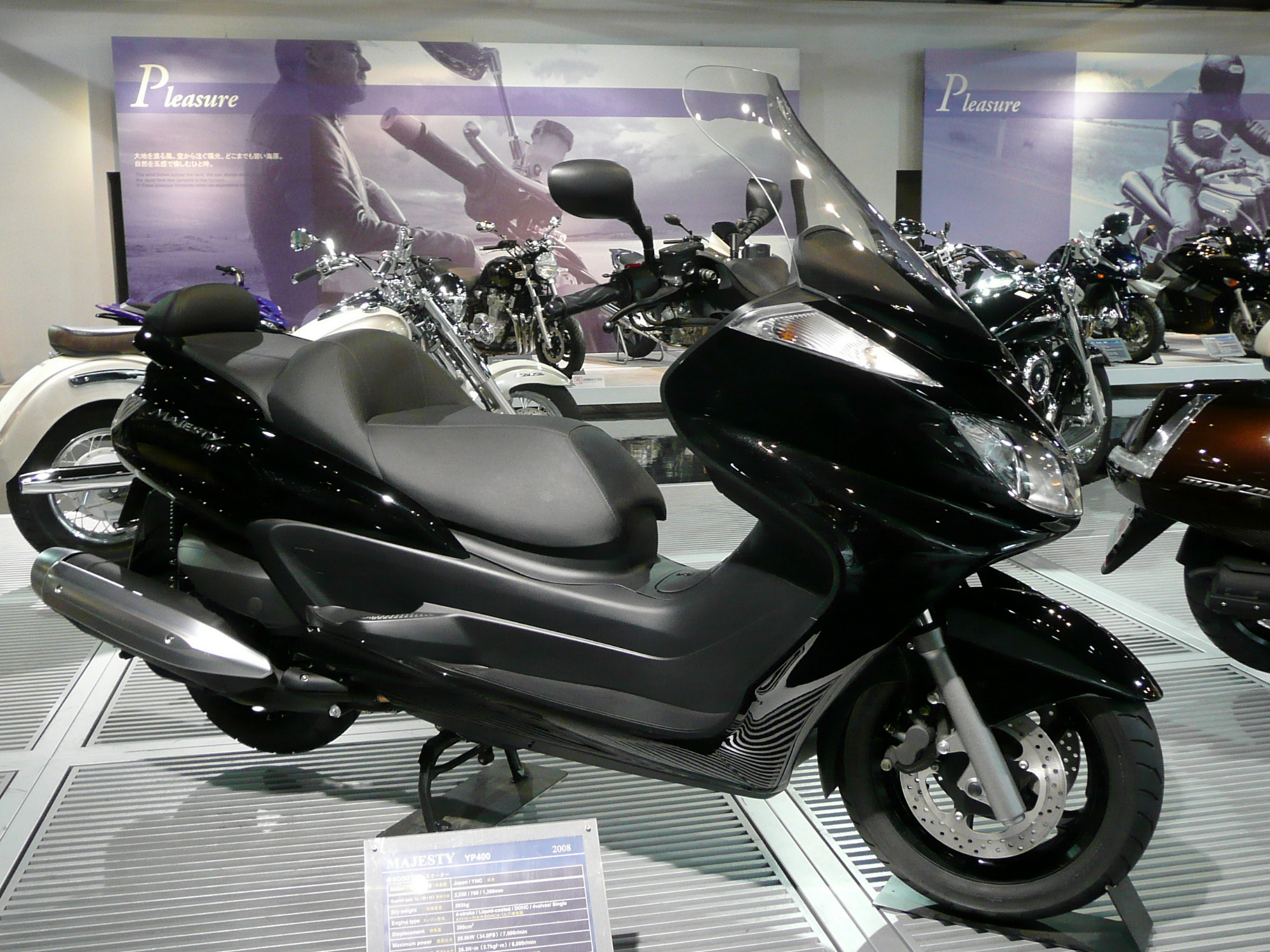
- Manufacturer: Yamaha
- Production: 2003–
- Class: Maxi-scooter
- Engine: 395 cc (24.1 cu in) 4-stroke
- Top speed: Over 145 km/h (90 mph) (with passenger)
- Transmission: V-belt automatic CVT
- Suspension: Front: telescopic fork, 120 mm, Rear: unit swing, 104 mm
- Brakes: 267 mm disc; 2 front, 1 rear
- Tires: Front: 120/80-14; Rear: 150/70-13
- Wheelbase: 1,560 mm (61.6 in)
- Dimensions: L: 2,230 mm (87.8 in); W: 780 mm (30.7 in); H: 1,380 mm (54.3 in)
- Seat height: 760 mm (30.0 in)
- Fuel capacity: 14 L (3.1 imp gal; 3.7 US gal)
- Fuel consumption: 3.9 L/100 km; 72 mpg_{‑imp} (60 mpg_{‑US})

Yamaha YP 400 Majesty is a scooter made by Yamaha beginning in 2003. The Majesty line includes 150, 250, and 400 cc (9.2, 15.3, and 24.4 cu in) displacement single-cylinder engine versions available in Europe and Asia. In the US, only the 400 cc model was sold, from 2004 to 2014.

The Majesty is a maxi-scooter, with a single-cylinder, counterbalanced 400 cc, DOHC fuel-injected engine with a continuously variable transmission (CVT), and a cast-aluminium frame.

The Majesty's engine has suction-piston-type fuel injection with a step-motor controlled, automatic idle speed control and throttle position sensor, an automatic decompression system, and a dual-chamber airbox, air-injection system and catalyst. The fuel tank holds 14 L; 3.1 imp gal (3.7 US gal). The transmission is a double-cog V-belt constantly variable automatic transmission. The bike's controlled-fill (cast) aluminum alloy main frame has a steel tube subframe and 41 mm fork tubes, and rear suspension with two long-travel coil-over shock absorbers. The cast wheels have 14-inch front and 13-inch rear tires. Braking is via 267 mm hydraulic front and rear disc brakes with a left handlebar-mounted parking brake lever. The bike's riding posture is between standard and cruiser. It has an integrated passenger grab rail, locking underseat storage with 16 US gal (61 L; 13 imp gal) capacity, two glove boxes (one lockable in the inner front apron), and an LED taillight. The instruments include an analog speedometer and tachometer, LCD multifunction display with fuel gauge, coolant temperature gauge, ambient temperature gauge, and V-belt change indicator. There is no oil pressure light or gauge.

The 2008 250 cc (15 cu in) YP250 Majesty has keyless ignition and a computer controlled automatic transmission with electable drive modes, called Yamaha Chip Controlled Shift (YCC-S).

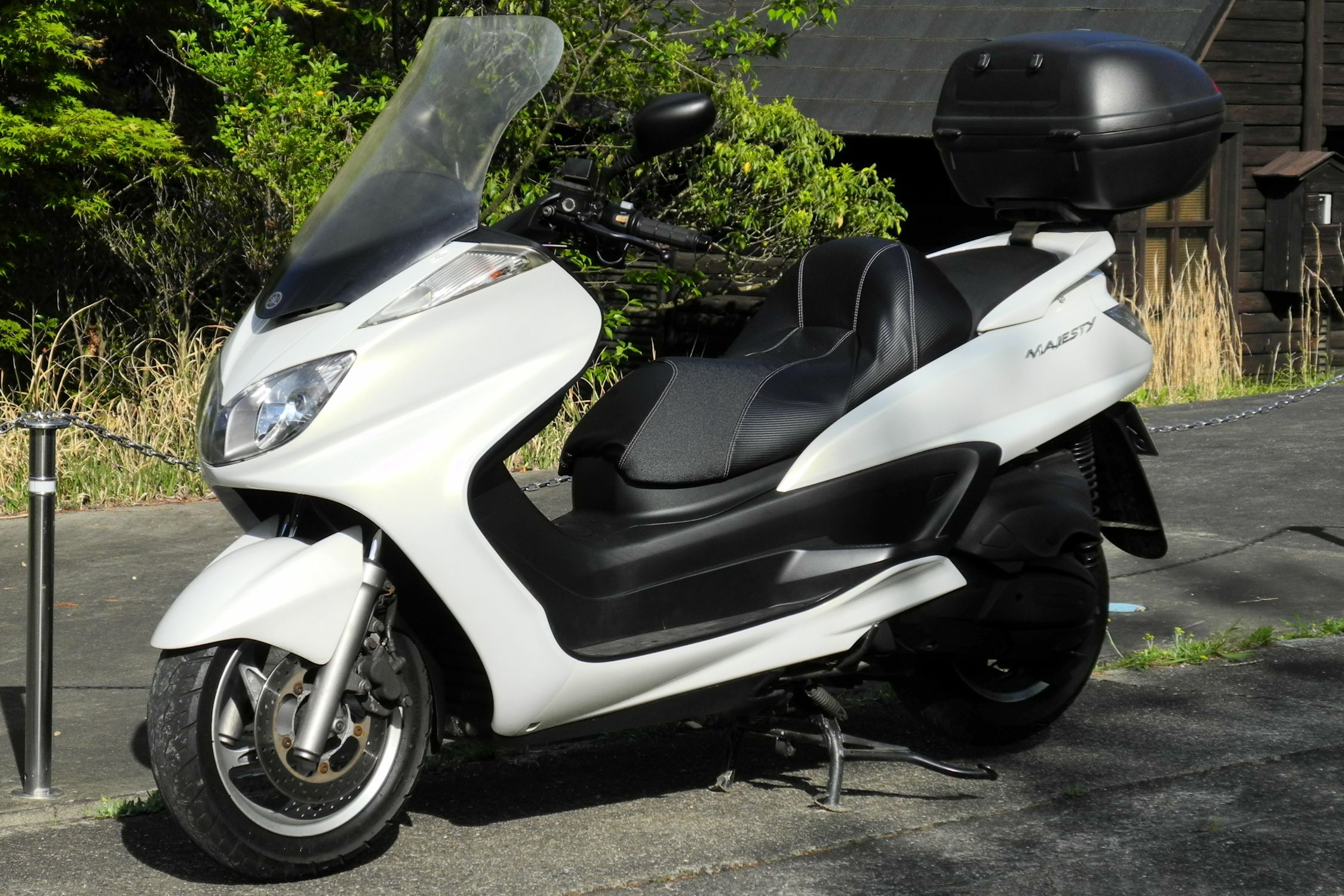
Yamaha Majesty 250
