= Moto Martin =

French engineering company

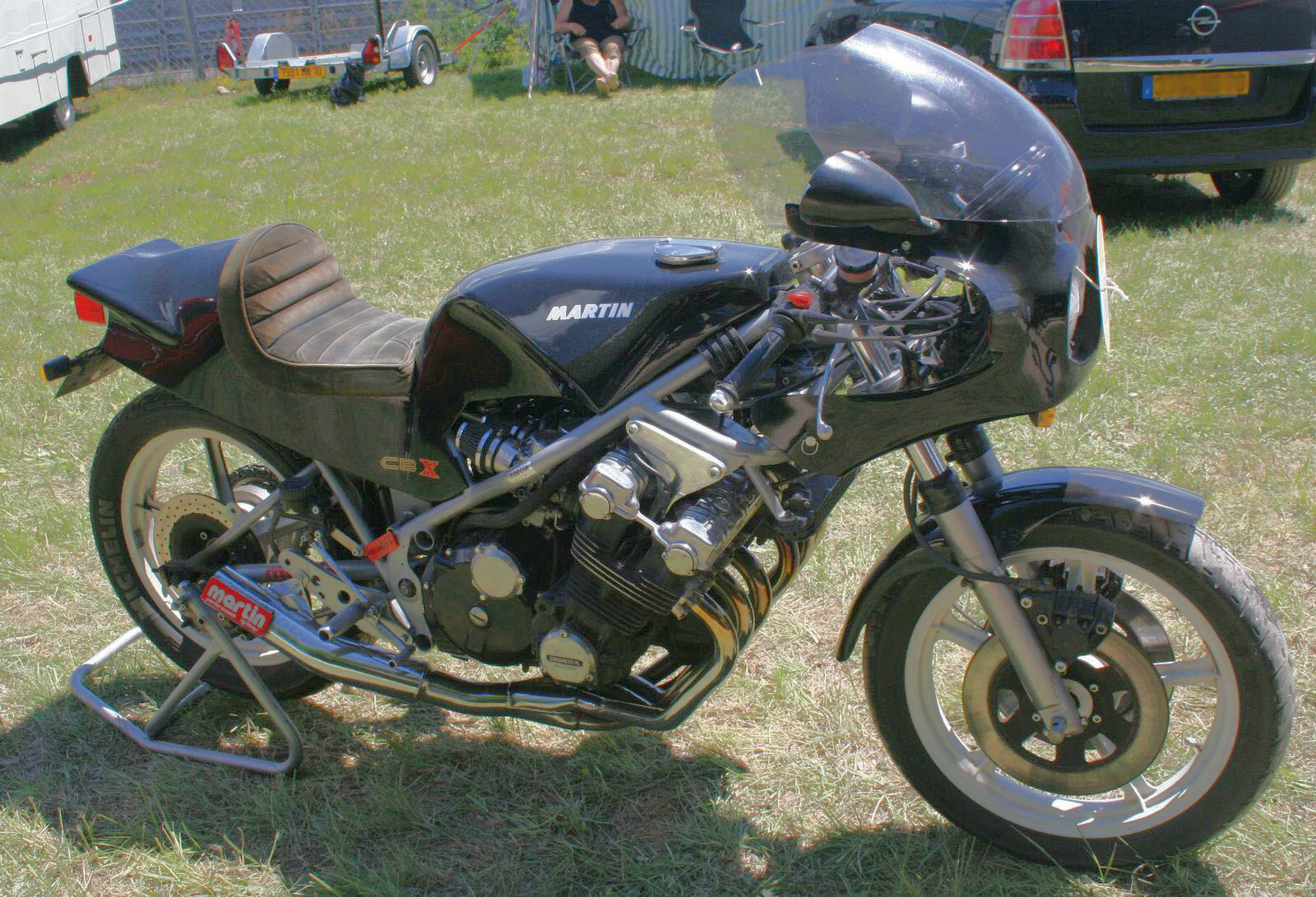
- Moto Martin Honda CBX1000 with single seat - a dual seat option was introduced from 1983
- Industry: Manufacturing
- Founder: Georges Martin
- Headquarters: France

Moto Martin is a French engineering company, started by Georges Martin, known for its motorsport inspired or café racer style racing frame kits for motorcycles. The original Moto Martin frame designs were based on the work of Fritz Egli. The company also manufactured its own wheels, body kits and, later, kitcars. Georges Martin capitalized upon building kit cars at a time when many riders in Europe couldn't afford to build their own modified cars. One model is known as a KZ900 Turbo. Cycle World in 1987 stated that "Moto Martin's products have a reputation for high-quality construction that places them above the level of most other frame manufacturers." Moto Martin motorcycles have been compared to the likes of Bimota, Harris and Nico Bakker.
