= Yamaha V50 =

Yamaha V50 may refer to:

- Yamaha V50 (motorcycle)
- Yamaha V50 (music workstation)
