= Honda Super Cub =

Light motorcycle

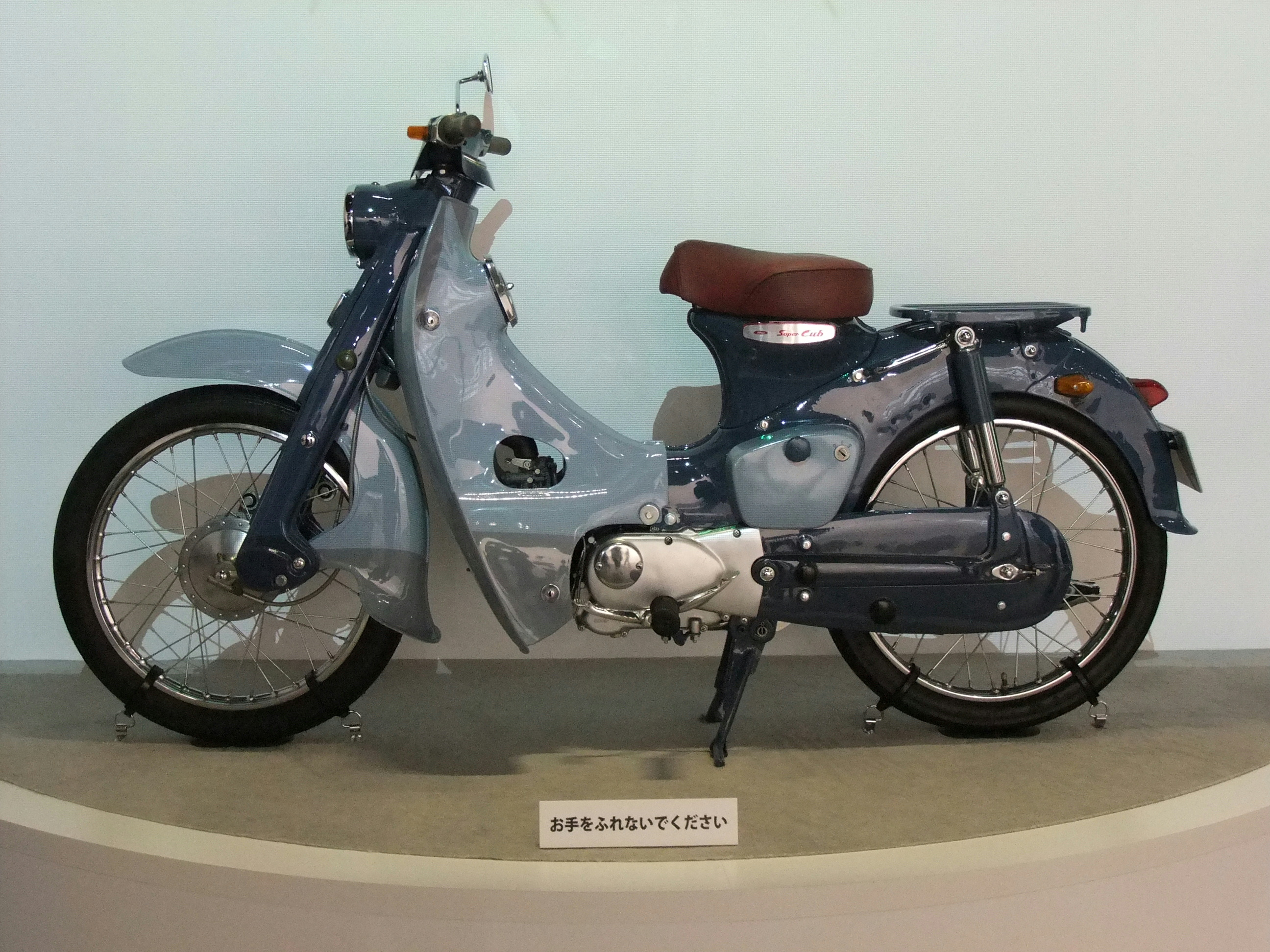
- Honda Super Cub in the Honda Collection Hall in Japan
- Also called: Honda C series (codename), C50, Passport, Econo Power, EX5, Dream 100, EX5 Dream, C100EX, Super Cub 50, Super Cub 110, Press Cub.
- Production: 1958–present
- Assembly: 15 countries worldwide
- Class: Underbone
- Engine: Horizontal 49–124 cc (3.0–7.6 cu in) 4-stroke air-cooled single
- Transmission: 3- or 4-speed semi-automatic transmission with wet multi-plate centrifugal clutch
- Frame type: Step through pressed steel monocoque underbone
- Suspension: Front: Leading link (early), telescopic fork (late); Rear: Swingarm
- Brakes: Front: drum latest model disk brakes Rear: drum
- Weight: 55–90 kg (121–198 lb) (dry)
- Related: Honda Wave (Southeast Asia); Honda Biz

The Honda Super Cub (or Honda Cub) is an underbone motorcycle manufactured and marketed by Honda, featuring a four-stroke single-cylinder engine ranging in displacement from 49 to 124 cc (3.0 to 7.6 cu in).

In continuous manufacture since 1958 with production surpassing 60 million in 2008, 87 million in 2014, and 100 million in 2017, the Super Cub is the most produced motor vehicle^{*} in history. Variants include the C50, C65, C70 (including the Passport), C90, C100 (including the EX) and it used essentially the same engine as the Sports Cub C110, C111, C114 and C115 and the Honda Trail series.

The Super Cub's US advertising campaign, You meet the nicest people on a Honda, had a lasting impact on Honda's image and on American attitudes to motorcycling, and is often used as a marketing case study.

== Development ==
The idea for a new 50-cubic-centimetre (3.1 cu in) motorcycle was conceived in 1956 when Honda Motor's Soichiro Honda and Takeo Fujisawa toured Germany and witnessed the popularity of mopeds and lightweight motorcycles. Soichiro Honda was primarily the engineering and production leader of the company, always with an eye towards winning on the racetrack, while his close partner Fujisawa was the man of finance and business, heading up sales and formulating strategies intended to dominate markets and utterly destroy Honda Motor's competitors. Fujisawa had been thinking about a long term expansion strategy, and unlike other Japanese companies, they did not want to simply boost production to cash in on the recent economic boom in Japan. A small, high-performance motorcycle was central to his plans. Upwardly mobile consumers in postwar Europe typically went from a bicycle to a clip-on engine, then bought a motor scooter, then a bubble car, and then a small car and onwards. Fujisawa saw that a motorcycle did not fit in this pattern for the average person, and he saw an opportunity to change that. Soichiro Honda was at the time tired of listening to Fujisawa talk about his new motorcycle idea; Honda came to Europe to win the Isle of Man TT race and he wanted to think about little else.

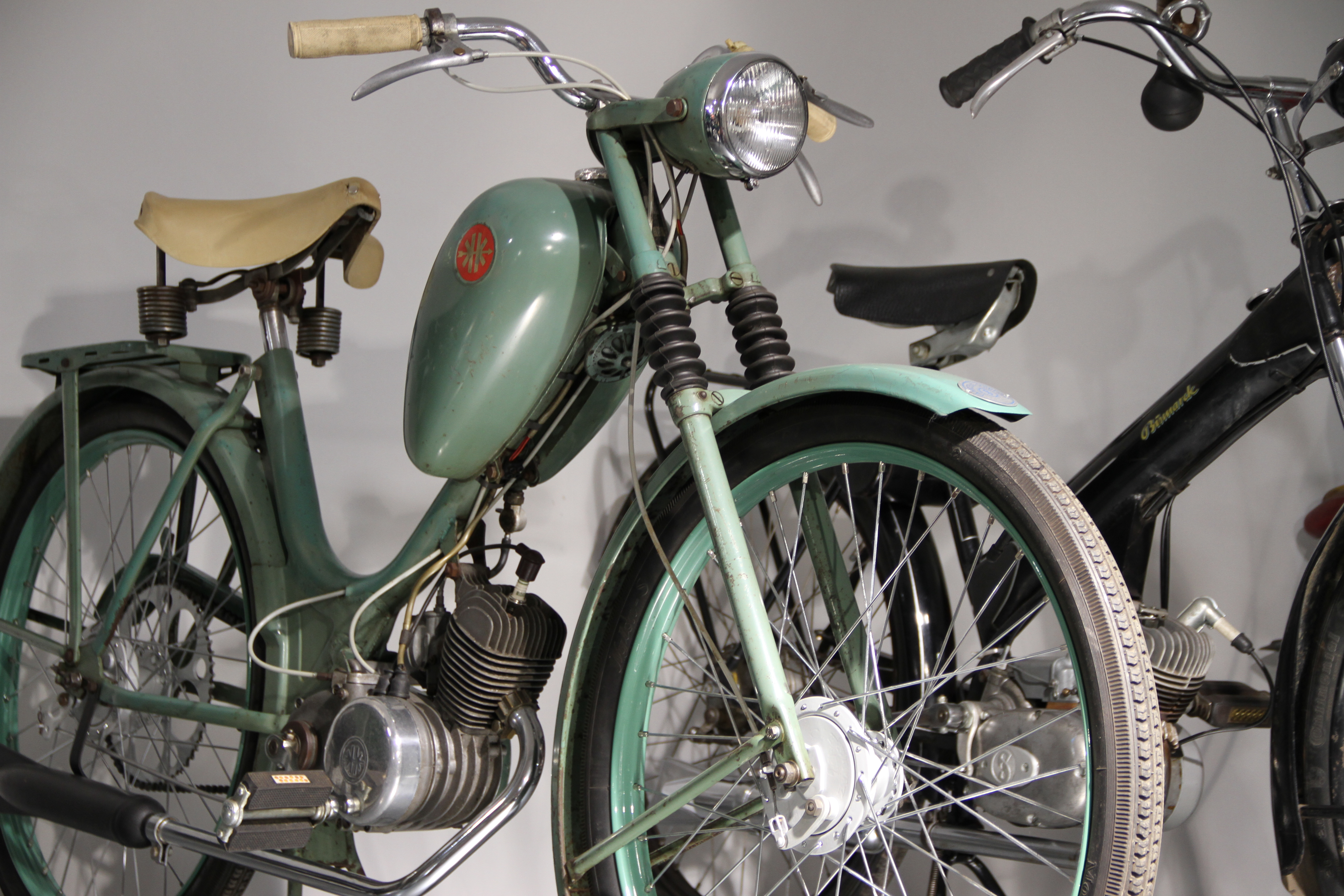
1954 Kreidler K50

Fujisawa and Honda visited Kreidler and Lambretta showrooms, as well as others, researching the kind of motorcycle Fujisawa had in mind. Fujisawa said these designs had "no future" and would not sell well. His concept was a two-wheeler for everyman, one that would appeal to both developed and developing countries, urban and rural. The new motorcycle needed to be technologically simple to survive in places without up-to-date know-how and access to advanced tools or reliable spare parts supplies. The common consumer complaints of noise, poor reliability, especially in the electrics, and general difficulty of use would have to be addressed. Because Honda was a large company growing larger, it needed a mass-appeal product that could be produced on an enormous scale. The design had to be sorted out before production began because it would be too costly to fix problems in the vast numbers that were to be manufactured. The scooter type nearly fitted the bill but was too complex for developing countries to maintain, and the small wheels did poorly on badly maintained or nonexistent roads. Another of Fujisawa's requirements was that it could be ridden with one hand while carrying a tray of soba noodles, saying to Honda, "If you can design a small motorcycle, say 50 cc with a cover to hide the engine and hoses and wires inside, I can sell it. I don't know how many soba noodle shops there are in Japan, but I bet you that every shop will want one for deliveries."

Once interested, Soichiro Honda began developing the Super Cub on his return to Japan. The following year Honda displayed a mockup to Fujisawa that finally matched what he had in mind, Fujisawa declaring the annual sales would be 30,000 per month, half again as many as the entire monthly two-wheeler market in Japan. His goal was to export motorcycles on a scale yet unseen in the economic disorder of postwar Japan when most companies halting trade efforts were handled through foreign trading companies. Honda would have to establish its own overseas subsidiary to provide the necessary service and spare parts distribution in a large country like the US. To this end American Honda Motor Company was founded in 1959. In 1961 a sales network was established in Germany, then in Belgium and the UK in 1962, and then France in 1964.

The Honda Juno had been the first scooter to use polyester resin, or fiberglass reinforced plastic (FRP), bodywork, and even though production of the Juno had stopped in 1954 as a result of Honda Motor's financial and labor problems at the time, Fujisawa continued to encourage research in polyester resin casting techniques, and these efforts bore fruit for the Super Cub. The new motorcycle's fairing would be polyethylene, the most widely used plastic, which reduced weight over FRP, but Honda's supplier had never made such a large die cast before, so the die had to be provided by Honda. The Super Cub was the first motorcycle ever to use a plastic fairing. Motorcycling historian Clement Salvadori wrote that the plastic front fender and leg shields were "perhaps the Cub's greatest contribution; plastic did the job just as well as metal at a considerably lower cost." The technology developed in the Isle of Man TT racing program was equally vital to the new lightweight motorcycle, making possible 3.4 kilowatts (4.5 hp) from a 50 cc four-stroke Honda engine, where the first engine the company built a decade earlier, a "fairly exact copy" of the 50 cc two stroke war-surplus Tohatsu engine Honda had been selling as motorized bicycle auxiliary engine, had only a 0.37–0.75 kilowatts (0.5–1 hp) output. Honda's first four-stroke, the 1951 E-type, had just a little more power than the Super Cub, 3.7 kilowatts (5 bhp), with nearly triple the displacement, 146 cc (8.9 cu in).

To make the new motorcycle, Honda built a new ¥10 billion factory in Suzuka, Mie to manufacture 30,000, and with two shifts, 50,000, Super Cubs per month. The factory was modeled on the Volkswagen Beetle production line in Wolfsburg, Germany. Until then, Honda's top models had sold only 2,000 to 3,000 per month, and observers thought the cost of the new plant too risky an expenditure. Edward Turner of BSA went to Japan to see the motorcycle industry in September 1960, and said that investments the size of the Suzuka plant were "extremely dangerous" because the US motorcycle market was already saturated. When completed in 1960, the Suzuka Factory was the largest motorcycle factory in the world and was a model for Honda's mass production facilities of the future. The economies of scale achieved at Suzuka cut 18% from the cost of producing each Super Cub when Suzuka could be run at full capacity, but in the short term Honda faced excess inventory problems when the new factory went into operation before the full sales and distribution network was in place.

== Design ==
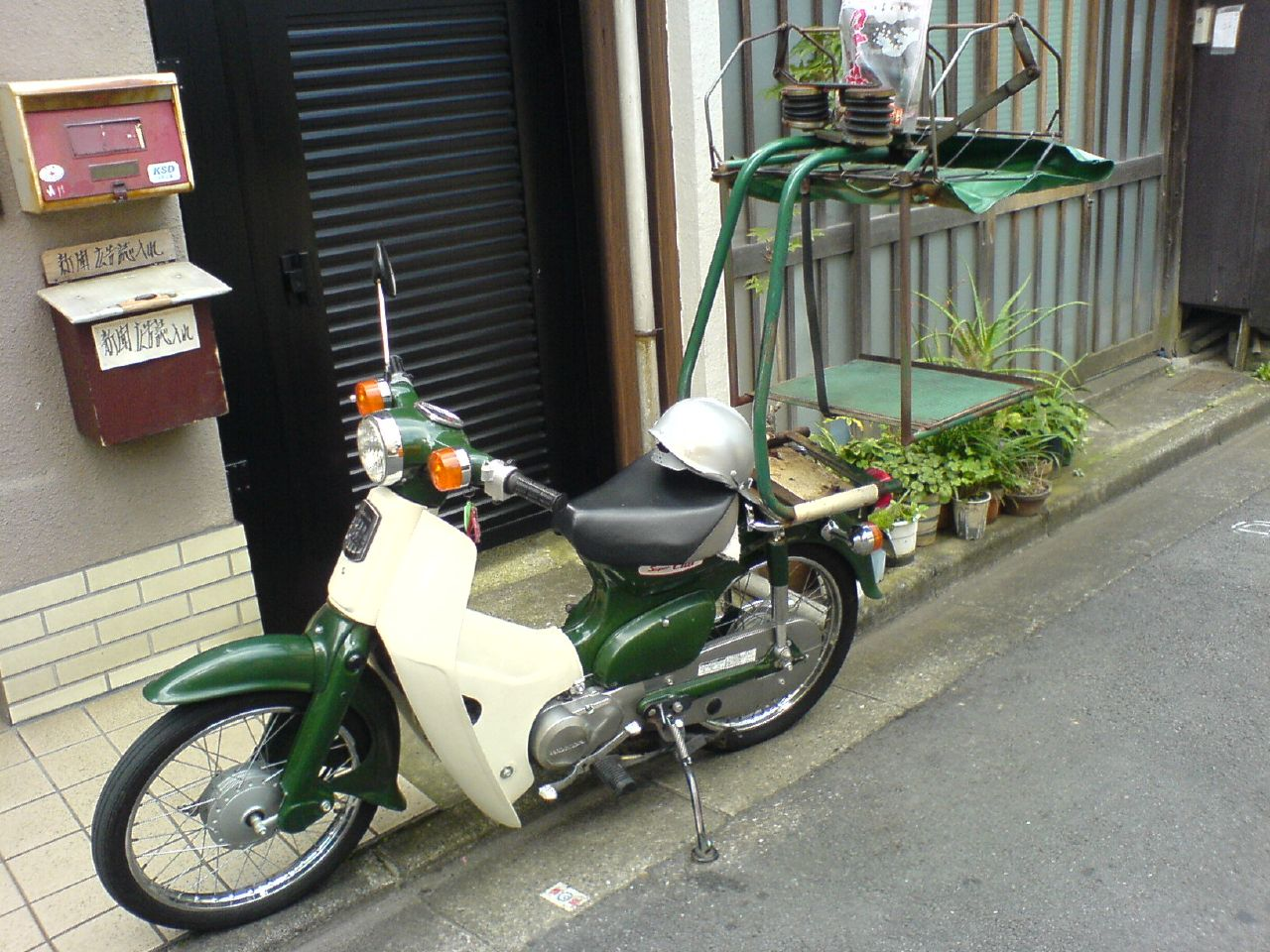
Late 2000s Super Cub

The Super Cub has been compared to the Ford Model T, Volkswagen Beetle and the Jeep as an icon of 20th century industry and transport. The C100 used a pressed steel monocoque chassis, with the horizontal engine placed below the central spine, a configuration now called the "step through" or "underbone" motorcycle. By some criteria, the type of motorcycle the Super Cub falls into is difficult to classify, landing somewhere between a scooter and a motorcycle, and sometimes it was called a moped, "step-thru", or scooterette.

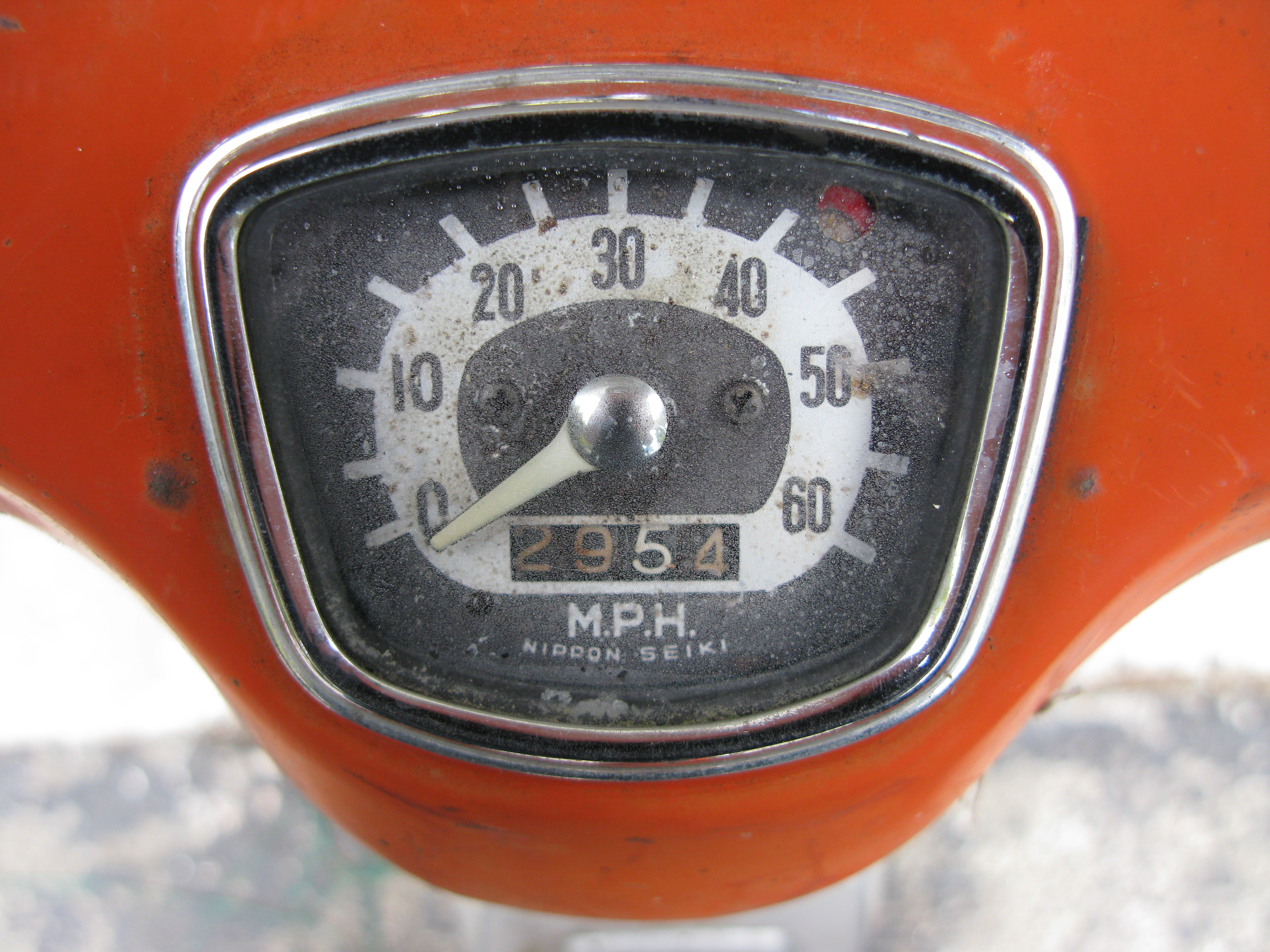
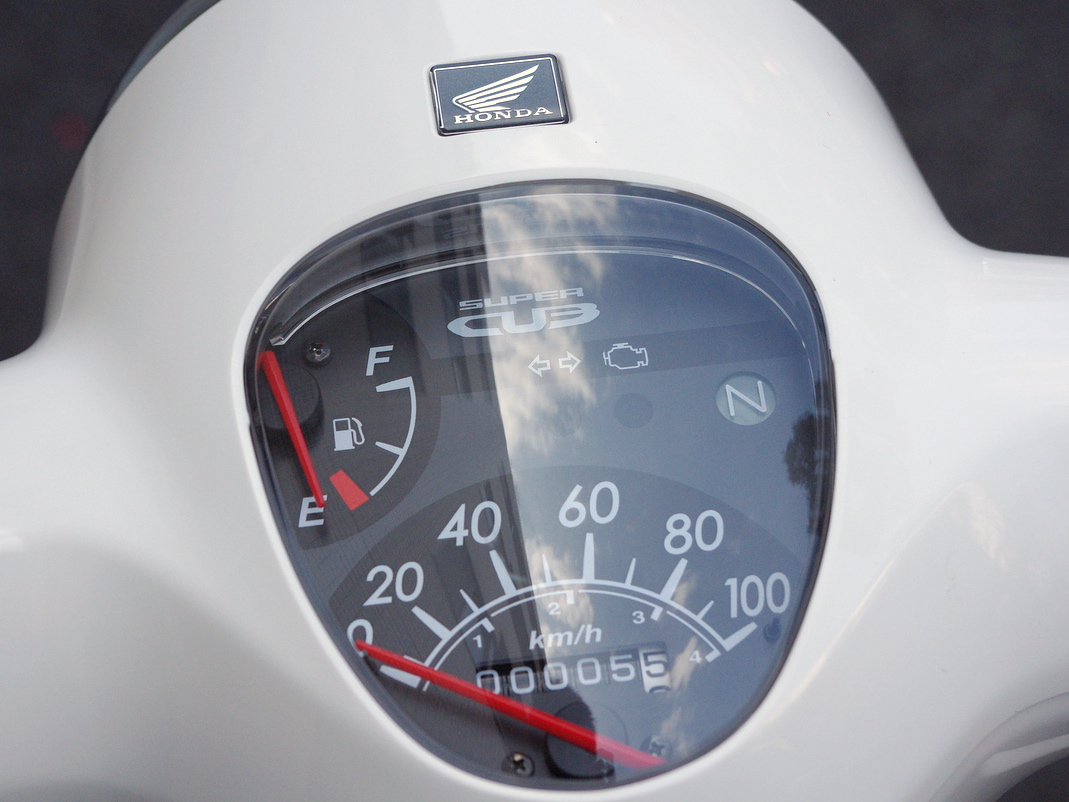
The instruments of a 1966 CA100 and 2009 Super Cub 110

The plastic fairing ran from below the handlebars and under the footpegs, protecting the rider's legs from wind and road debris, as well as hiding the engine from view. This design was like the full enclosure of a scooter, but unlike a scooter, the engine and gearbox unit was not fixed to the rear axle. This had several benefits. It moved the engine down and away from the seat, detaching the rear swingarm motion from the drivetrain for lower unsprung weight. It also made engine cooling air flow more direct, and made it possible to fit larger wheels. Placing the engine in the center of the frame, rather than close to the rear wheel, greatly improved front-rear balance. The fuel tank was located under the hinged seat, which opened to reveal the fuel filler inlet. The 17 inch wheels, in comparison to the typical 10 inch wheels of a scooter, were more stable, particularly on rough roads, and psychologically made the motorcycle more familiar, having an appearance closer to a bicycle than a small-wheel scooter.

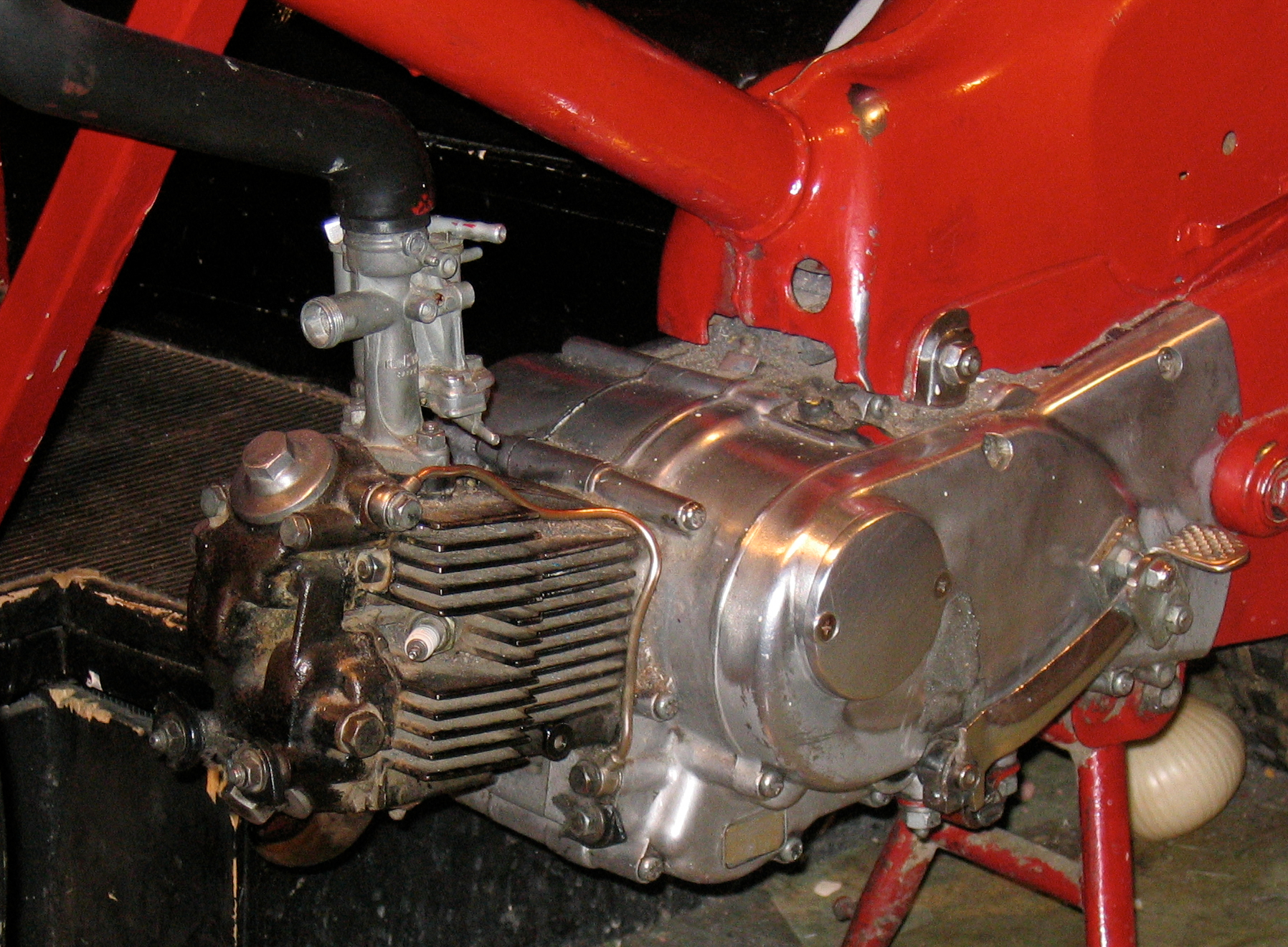
The Super Cub early push-rod engine

The pushrod overhead valve (OHV) air-cooled four-stroke single cylinder engine had a 40-by-39-millimetre (1.6 in × 1.5 in) bore × stroke, displacing 49 cubic centimetres (3.0 cu in), and could produce 3.4 kilowatts (4.5 hp) at 9,500 rpm, for maximum speed of 69 km/h (43 mph), under favorable conditions. The low compression ratio meant the engine could consume inexpensive and commonly available low octane fuel, as well as minimizing the effort to kick start the engine, making the extra weight and expense of an electric starter an unnecessary creature comfort. Though some of the many Super Cub variations came with both kick and electric start, the majority sold well without it. Even the latest 2011 model year Japanese domestic market (JDM) Super Cub 50 and Super Cub 110 versions, with modern technology and conveniences like fuel injection and a fuel gauge, were not offered with an electric start option.

The sequential-shifting three- or four-speed gearbox was manually shifted, but clutchless, without the need for a clutch lever control, using instead a centrifugal clutch along with a plate clutch slaved to the foot-shift lever to engage and disengage the gearbox from the engine. While not intuitive to learn, once the rider got used to it, the semi-automatic transmission, "took the terror out of motorcycling" for novice riders. Unlike many scooters CVTs, the centrifugal clutch made it possible to push start the Super Cub, a useful advantage if the need arose.

The early Super Cubs used a 6 volt ignition magneto mounted on the flywheel, with a battery to help maintain power to the lights, while later ones were upgraded to capacitor discharge ignition (CDI) systems. The lubrication system did not use an oil pump or oil filter, but was a primitive splash-fed system for both the crankcase and gearbox, with a non-consumable screen strainer to collect debris in the engine oil. Both the front and rear brakes were drums. On both the front and rear wheels were 2.25" × 17" wire spoke wheels, with full-width hubs.

Honda recommended daily checks of the lights, horn, tire pressure, brakes, fuel and oil level, and a weekly check of the battery electrolyte level. The new engine break-in maintenance was done at 320 kilometres (200 mi), requiring adjustment of the valve tappets and contact breaker points, and an oil change, and the rider was advised to stay under 48 kilometres per hour (30 mph) for the first 800 kilometres (500 mi). Every 1,600 kilometres (1,000 mi) the spark plug needed cleaning, and the chain adjustment checked, and every 3,200 kilometres (2,000 mi) an oil change, breaker point check, and valve adjustment was due. At 8,000 kilometres (5,000 mi), major maintenance was due, requiring the removal and cleaning of the carburetor, drive chain, exhaust silencer, and wheel bearings. The rider closed a manual choke to aid in starting at cold temperatures. By the standards of the day, this was a simple motorcycle, with minimal maintenance demands, and it earned a reputation for high reliability.

== You meet the nicest people on a Honda ==
You meet the nicest people on a Honda magazine advertisement

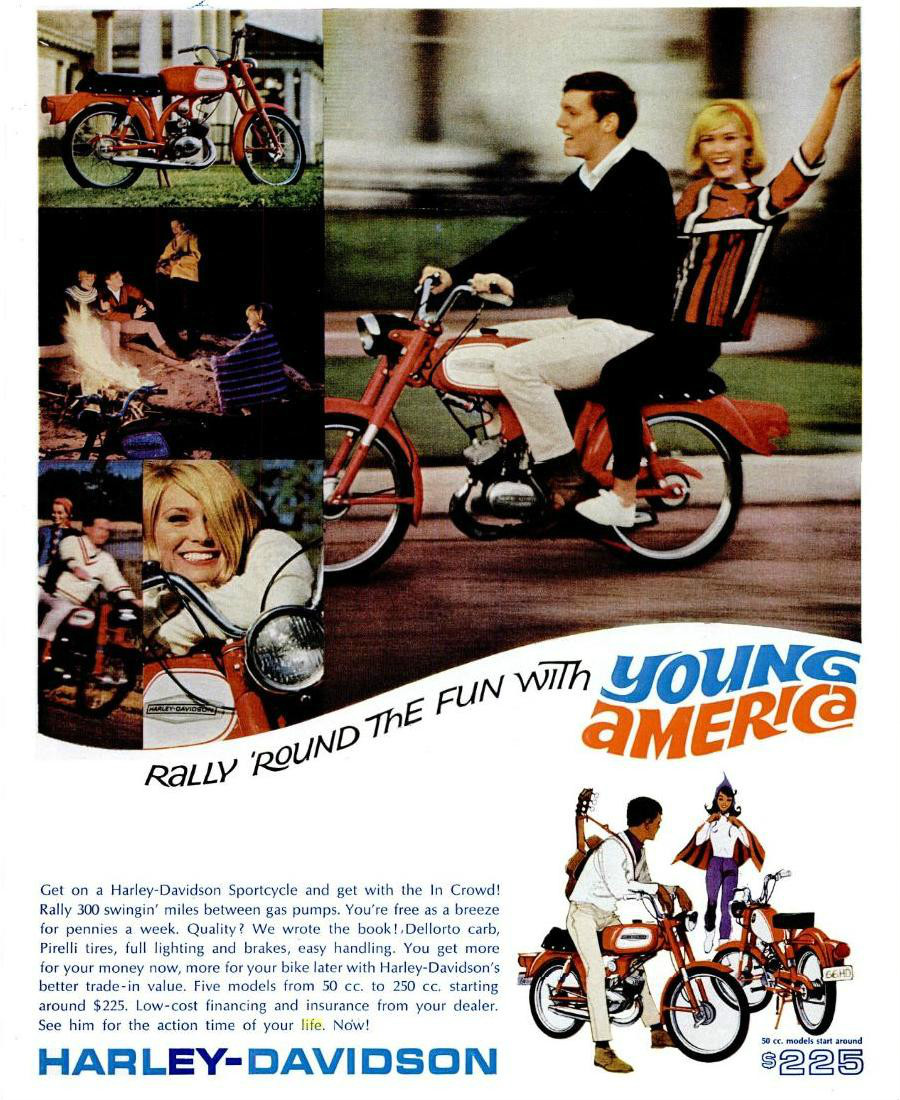
Harley-Davidson's "Young America" campaign

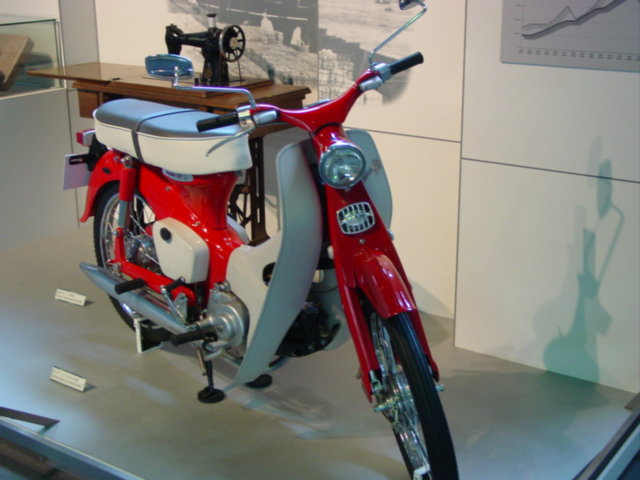
50 cc CA100, US version

In June 1963 in US media, Honda began the 12-year-long advertising campaign You meet the nicest people on a Honda, created by Robert Emmenegger, creative director, Grey Advertising. Grey had bought the idea from an UCLA undergraduate student named Mike Curb, who had created the concept for a class assignment. The event marked the beginning of the decline of domestic and British motorcycle brands in the US market, and the rise of Honda and the other Japanese companies. In December 1965, Edward Turner said the sale of small Japanese motorcycles was good for BSA, by attracting new riders who would graduate to larger machines, not anticipating that the Japanese would advance over the next 5 years to directly threaten British bikes with technically sophisticated models such as the Honda CB750, and the Kawasaki Z1. As a case study in business and marketing, the campaign is still remembered half a century later, with one strategic management textbook saying, "Honda and the Supercub is probably the best known and most debated case in business strategy." It was credited with having "invented the concept of lifestyle marketing."

Specific elements of the Super Cub's design were integral to the campaign, such as the enclosed chain that kept chain lubricant from being flung on the rider's clothing, and the leg shield that similarly blocked road debris and hid the engine, and the convenience of the semi-automatic transmission. Presenting the Super Cub as a consumer appliance not requiring mechanical aptitude and an identity change into "a motorcyclist", or worse, "a biker", differentiated Honda's offering, because, "the dedication required to maintain bikes of that era limited ownership to a relatively small demographic, often regarded as young men known for their black leather jackets and snarling demeanors."

Rather than remaining limited to trying to convince traditional downmarket male buyers to switch to Honda from other brands with the macho approach of most motorcycle advertising at the time, Honda broke new ground. The ad campaign sought to improve the image of motorcycling in general and expand the overall size of the motorcycle market by attracting new riders. In a stroke of good fortune for Honda, Brian Wilson and Mike Love composed the 1964 song "Little Honda", extolling the joys of riding the Honda 50, and even inviting the listener to visit their local Honda dealership, in language that sounded as if it could have been written, or at least paid for, by Honda's advertising copywriters, yet it was not a commercial jingle. The song was released by The Hondells in 1964, followed by the release of the original recording by The Beach Boys. In 1965 The Hondells released "You Meet the Nicest People on a Honda", another song promoting the Super Cub, which was actually used in Honda's TV spots, as a B side to their version of "Sea Cruise".

The long-running campaign, including the slogan, the music, and the upbeat images of respectable, middle and upper-class people, particularly women, riding Hondas became closely associated with the Honda brand since. The image Honda created was contrasted with the one percenter "bad boy" biker and became a focal point of Japan bashing boosterism of US-made Harley-Davidson motorcycles.

Aside from Harley-Davidson fans, the company itself had a more conflicted reaction to the successful Honda "You meet the nicest people" campaign. At first, they were offended at the suggestion that Harley-Davidson riders were not "nice people." Harley-Davidson had, since its founding in 1903, scrupulously cultivated an image of staid respectability, and would not begin to tentatively embrace the "outlaw" demographic of their customer base for at least another ten years. In 1964 they denied any association with one-percenter bikers, and so distanced themselves from the implications of Honda's campaign. But they also "tried to have it both ways", and soon joined Vespa and Yamaha in producing ads that were "suspiciously similar" to "You meet the nicest people." Whether they were being offended by or imitating Honda, at the time Harley-Davidson did not share the interpretation that Honda's advertisements, "added to the macho Harley image."

== Model history ==
Production history
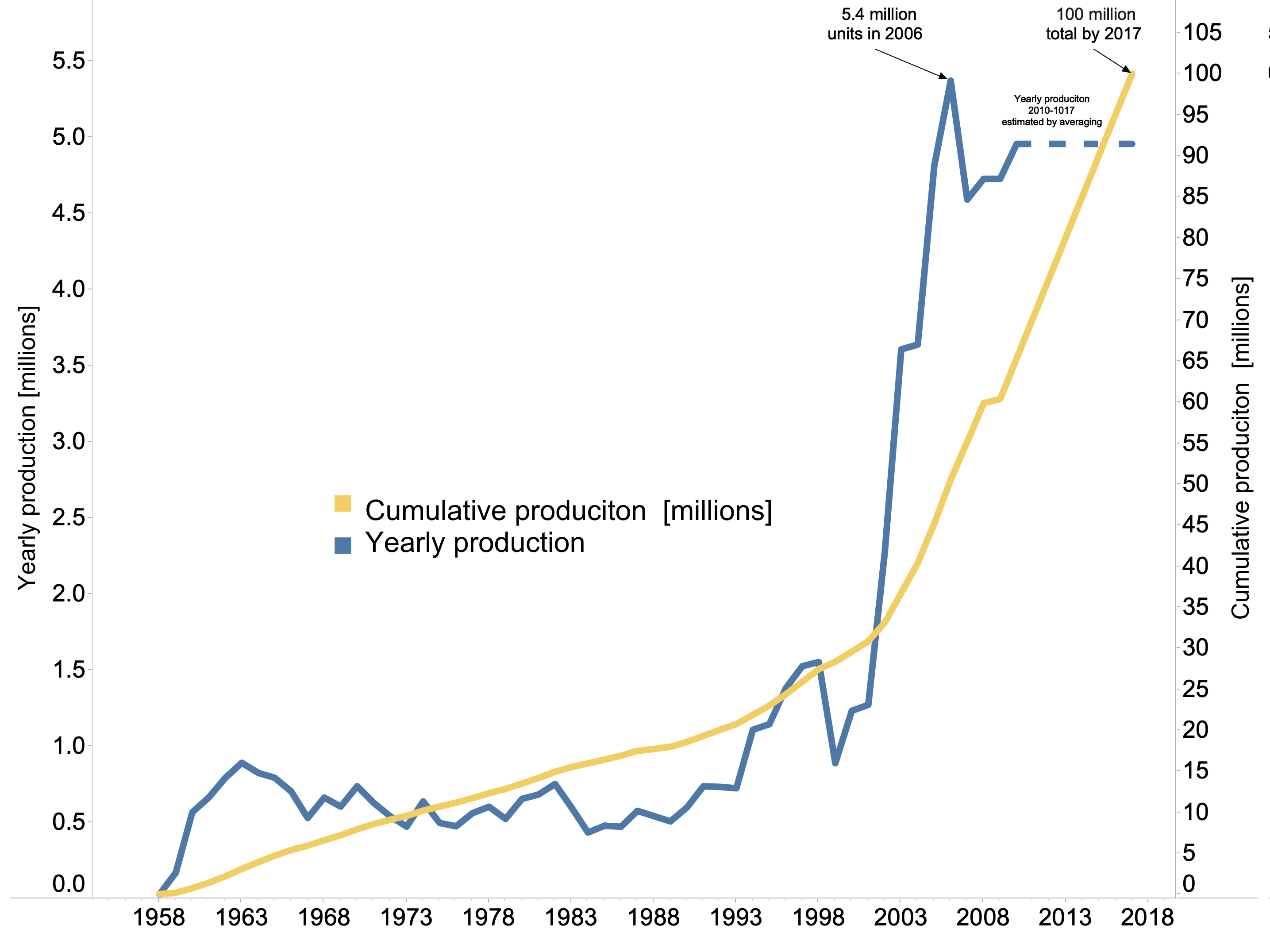
- Annual Super Cub production from 1958 through 2008, the year cumulative production passed the 60 million units milestone.

Timeline of production locations
- 1958 Yamato Plant, Japan; 1959 Hamamatsu Factory, Japan; 1960 Suzuka Factory, Japan; 1961 Taiwan; 1963 Belgium; 1966 Bangladesh; 1967 Thailand; 1969 Malaysia; 1971 Indonesia; 1973 Philippines; 1976 Manaus, Brazil; 1980 Mauritius; 1981 Colombia; 1981 Nigeria; 1985 India; 1988 Mexico; 1989 Brazil; 1991 Ōzu, Kumamoto, Japan; 1997 Vietnam; 2002 China; 2004 Laos; 2005 Cambodia; 2006 Argentina; 2007 Peru; Sites no longer making Super Cubs in gray

The Honda Super Cub debuted in 1958, ten years after the establishment of Honda Motor Co. Ltd. The original 1952 Honda Cub F had been a clip-on bicycle engine. Honda kept the name but added the prefix 'Super' for the all-new lightweight machine. The Super Cub sold poorly at first, owing mainly to the recession in Japan, and then three months after the 1958 launch when customer complaints began rolling in about slipping clutches. Honda salesmen and factory workers gave up holidays to repair the affected Super Cubs, visiting each customer in person. When it was imported to the US, the name was changed to Honda 50, and later Honda Passport C70, and C90, because the Piper Super Cub airplane trademark had precedence. Similarly, in Britain they were only badged "Honda 50", "Honda 90" etc. as the Triumph Tiger Cub preceded.

The Society of Automotive Engineers of Japan recognised the 1958 Honda Super Cub C100 as one of their 240 Landmarks of Japanese Automotive Technology.

=== Super Cub line ===
The first Super Cub variation was the C102, launched in April 1960. The C102 had electric start in addition to kick starting, and battery and coil ignition instead of magneto, but was otherwise the same as the C100.

The enlarged 86.7 cc (5.29 cu in) OHV engine of the 1963 C200 was used on the 1965 CM90 step-through. New in 1965 was a 63 cc (3.8 cu in) engine with a chain-driven overhead camshaft (OHC). This was used in two new models: the C65, a step-through with 4.1 kW (5.5 bhp), and the S65, with a pressed steel sports frame and 4.6 kW (6.2 bhp) at 10,000 rpm.

In 1966 the C50 appeared and remained in production through the mid 80s, becoming one of the most widespread and familiar versions of the Super Cub. Honda replaced the C100's 40 mm × 39 mm (1.6 in × 1.5 in) 50 cc OHV engine with the 39 mm × 41.4 mm (1.54 in × 1.63 in) OHC alloy head and iron cylinder engine from the CS50 and C65, which increased power from 3.4 to 3.6 kW (4.5 to 4.8 bhp). Similarly the CM90 was replaced in 1966 with the 89.5 cc (5.46 cu in) 5.6 kW (7.5 bhp) OHC CM91, which a year later on 1967, got restyled forks and headlamp like the C50, to become the familiar C90. Though the basic design of Cub remained unchanged, new styling and improvements included enclosed front forks. The C100 stayed in production alongside the newer versions one more year, until 1967. After 1980 the USA C70 was called the C70 Passport.

Because some countries offered age restriction and tax advantages for mopeds, Honda also introduced the C310S, a moped version of the Super Cub complete with bicycle pedals. The C310S fuel tank was relocated from beneath the seat to a more conventional placement at the top of the leg shield. This iteration is now somewhat rare, having been marketed primarily in the Benelux countries.

In 1982, for most markets, Honda fitted a new capacitor discharge ignition (CDI) system to replace the earlier contact points ignition, thereby helping to meet emission standards in markets such as the US. At the same time the electrical system was changed from 6 volt to 12 volts.

In 1984, Honda released restyled versions of the Cubs on some markets, with square lamps and plastic-covered handlebars and rear mudguard, also the c50 gearbox was changed to a fully automatic 3 speed with added parking brake. On the domestic Japanese market the square style was optional, but in some places such as the UK they replaced imports of the traditionally styled round lamp Cub.

In 1986, a larger 100 cc HA05E engine model was introduced especially for Asian markets. The newer 100 cc model was developed exclusively for Southeast Asian market, especially in Thailand, Malaysia and Vietnam, where underbones were very popular, with new features such as a telescopic front suspension to replace the older leading link suspension, and a four-speed transmission to replace the older three-speed transmission used in older Cub variants. The 100 cc model was initially known as the Honda Dream in Thailand and Honda EX5 High Power in Malaysia, before being standardized as the Honda EX5 Dream in 2003. In addition, Honda Japan began importing the made-in-Thailand Dream as the Super Cub C100EX in 1988. The Japanese C100EX was later being facelifted in 1993, while the Southeast Asian EX5 Dream retains the 1986 design until the present day, with only minor cosmetic changes. In 2011, the carbureted EX5 Dream was phased out in Thailand and being replaced with the fuel-injected Honda Dream 110i, with the powertrain being derived from the fuel-injected Honda Wave 110i.

In the late 1990s, Honda introduced their newer NF series motorcycles, known as Honda Wave series, called the Honda Innova in some markets, which use steel tube frames, front disc brake, and plastic cover sets in various displacement options: 100 cc, 110 cc and 125 cc. Though not Cubs, these bikes sold consistently well particularly in European countries, where the production of Honda Cub models had been previously discontinued. However, the production of Honda Cubs in Asia and Africa still continues today, even though the newer Honda Wave Series and other designs have been introduced alongside the Cub. Since the 1990s Honda began slowly phasing out its old style Cub engine which has been in use (initially as a pushrod style engine) since the start of the Cub line in 1958. Presently, all Honda Cubs use Wave based engines including most other small bore motorcycles (Grom, Monkey, Dax, CRF110, etc.). Honda made the switch to distance themselves from counterfeit or clone engines that were beginning to come out of China, and are not compatible dimensionally with the old style Cub engines. These engines range in displacement from 50cc-125cc.

Starting in 2007 Japanese market Cubs began using Honda's PGM-FI fuel injection.

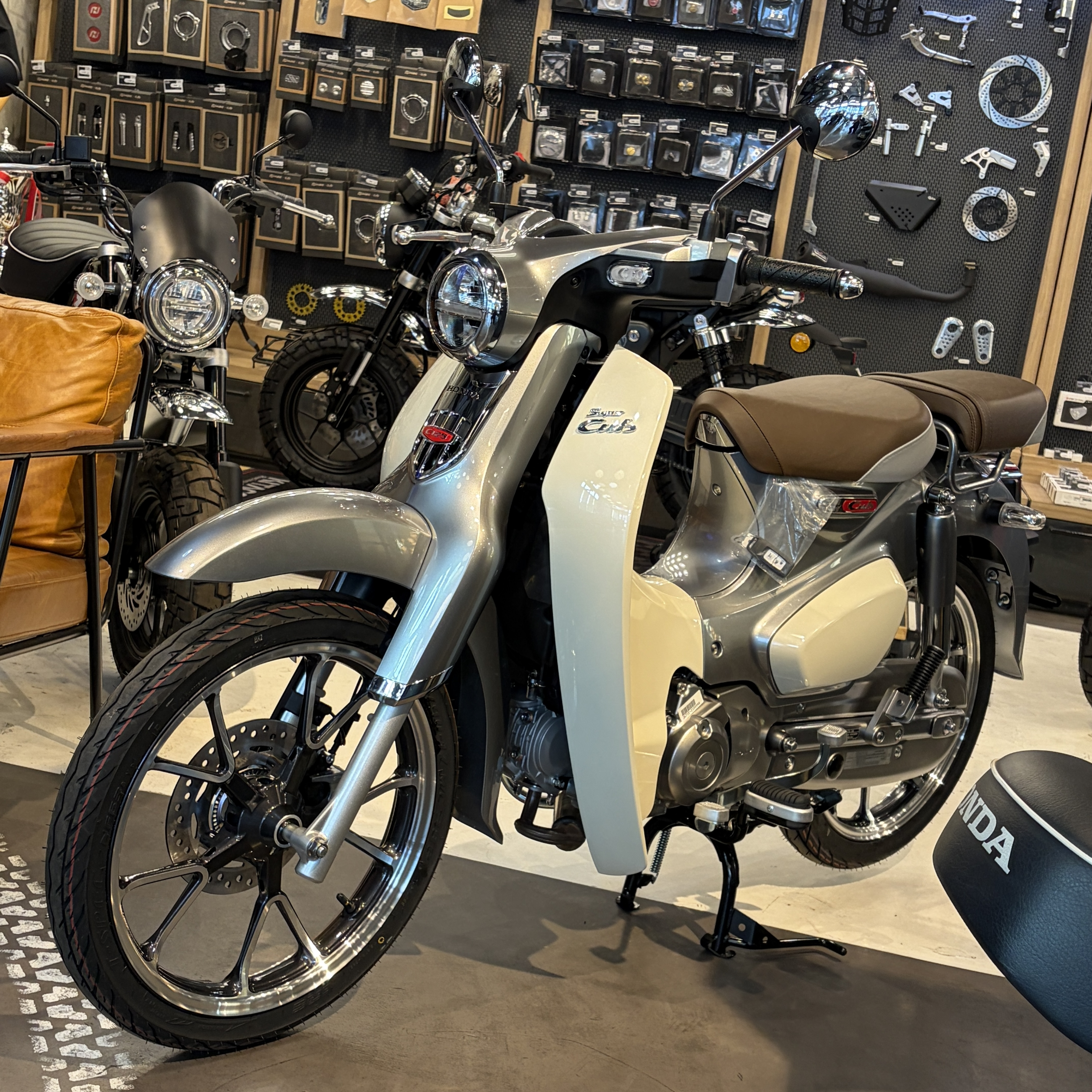
A 2026 Honda super cub C125 based on the 2018 redesign. It is the largest displacement Cub or Super Cub ever produced at 125cc.

Honda made a 2018 model year special edition to commemorate the 60th anniversary of Super Cub production, with a celebration at the Ōzu, Kumamoto factory where the 100 millionth Super Cub was produced in October 2017 .

In 2018 a new model was released in the US, Europe, and Australia with a 125cc engine. It features ABS front disk brakes, LED headlights, and a keyless ignition using a smart key. This model was available in limited numbers. It is still sold in some of these countries as of 2026.

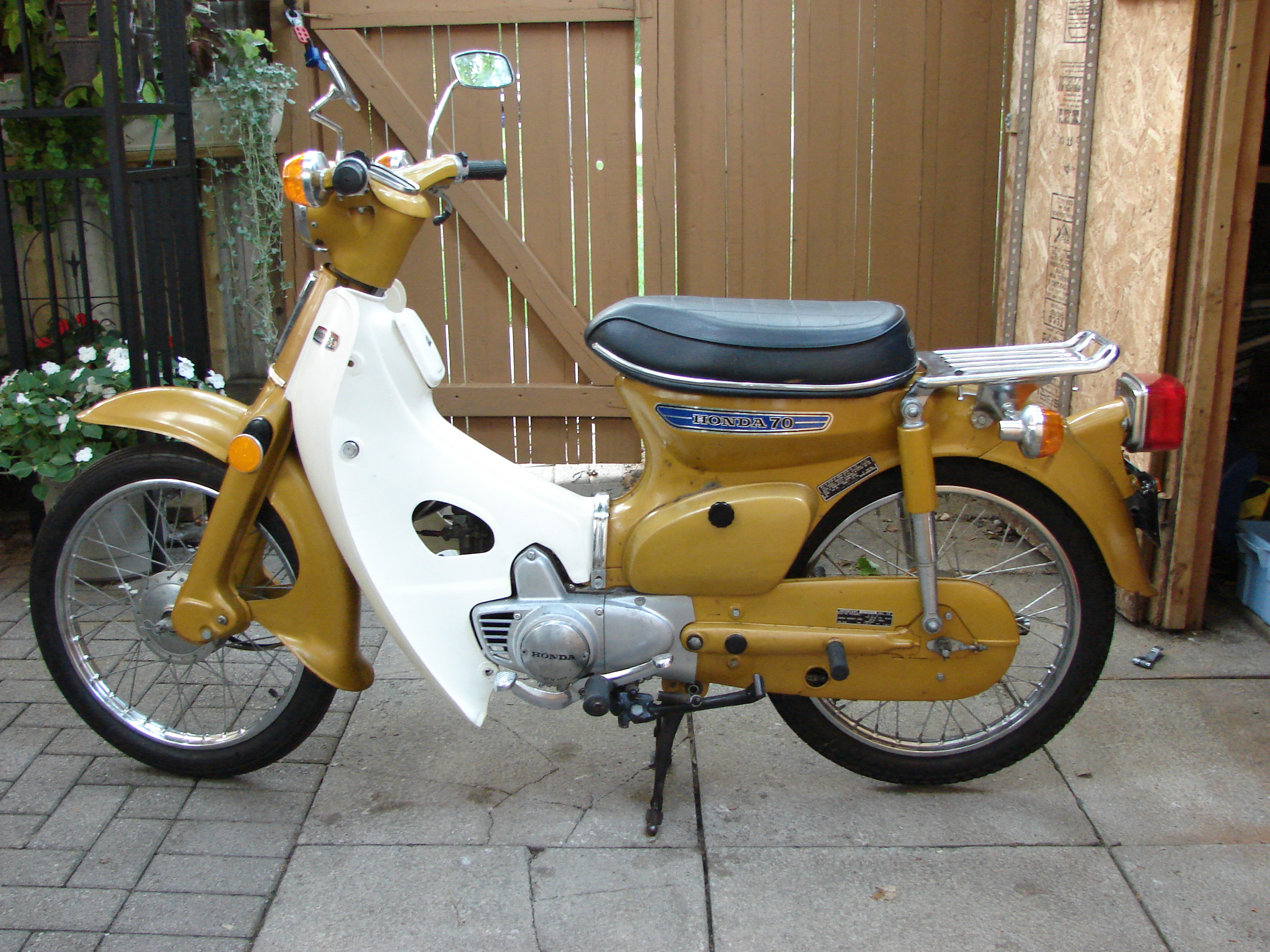
1972 C70

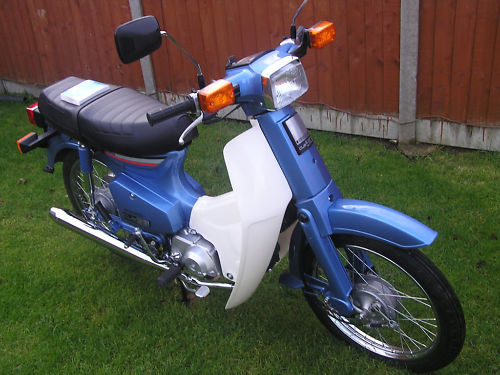
A 12v square headlight C90

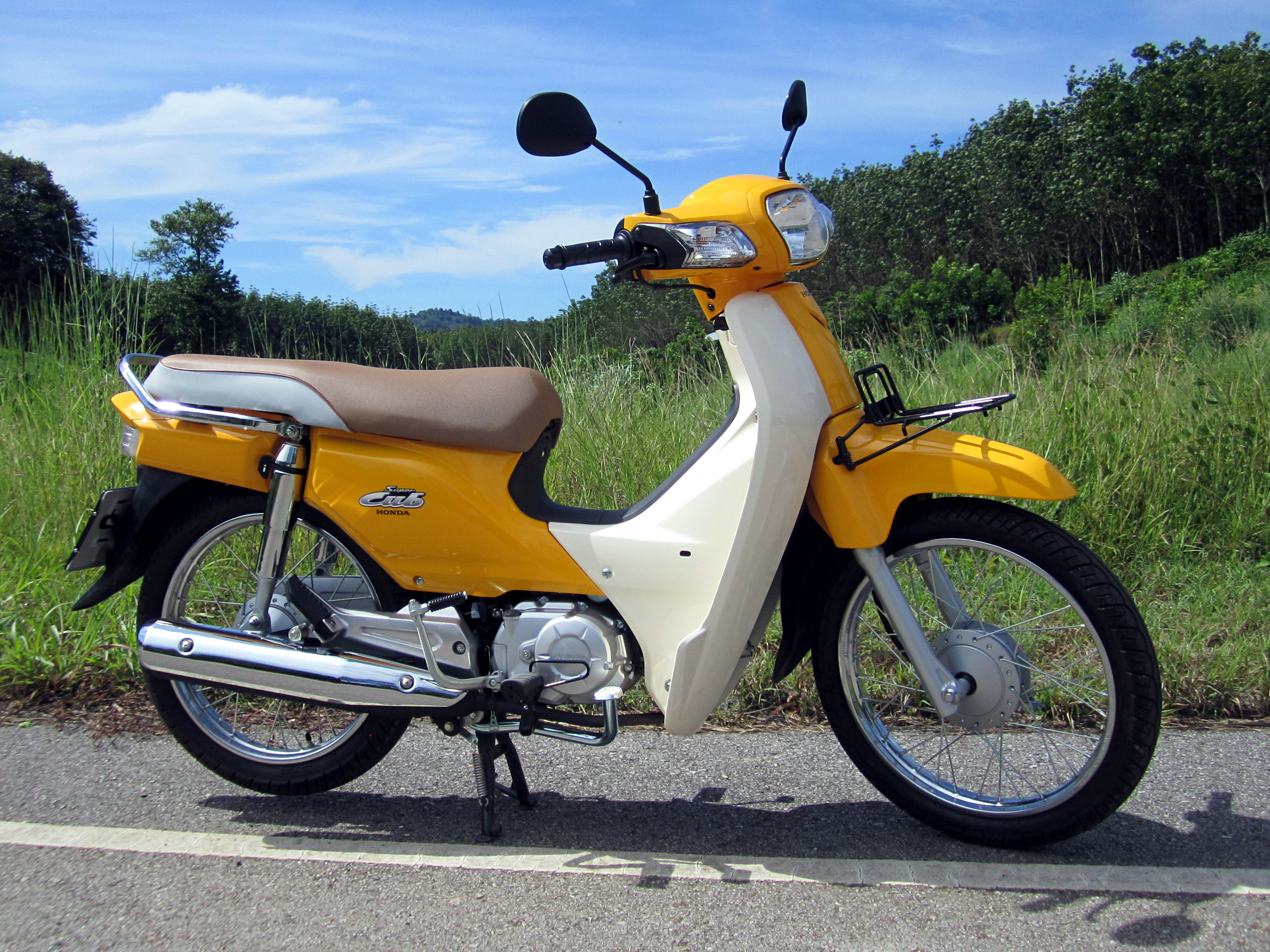
2014 Dream 110i Super Cub

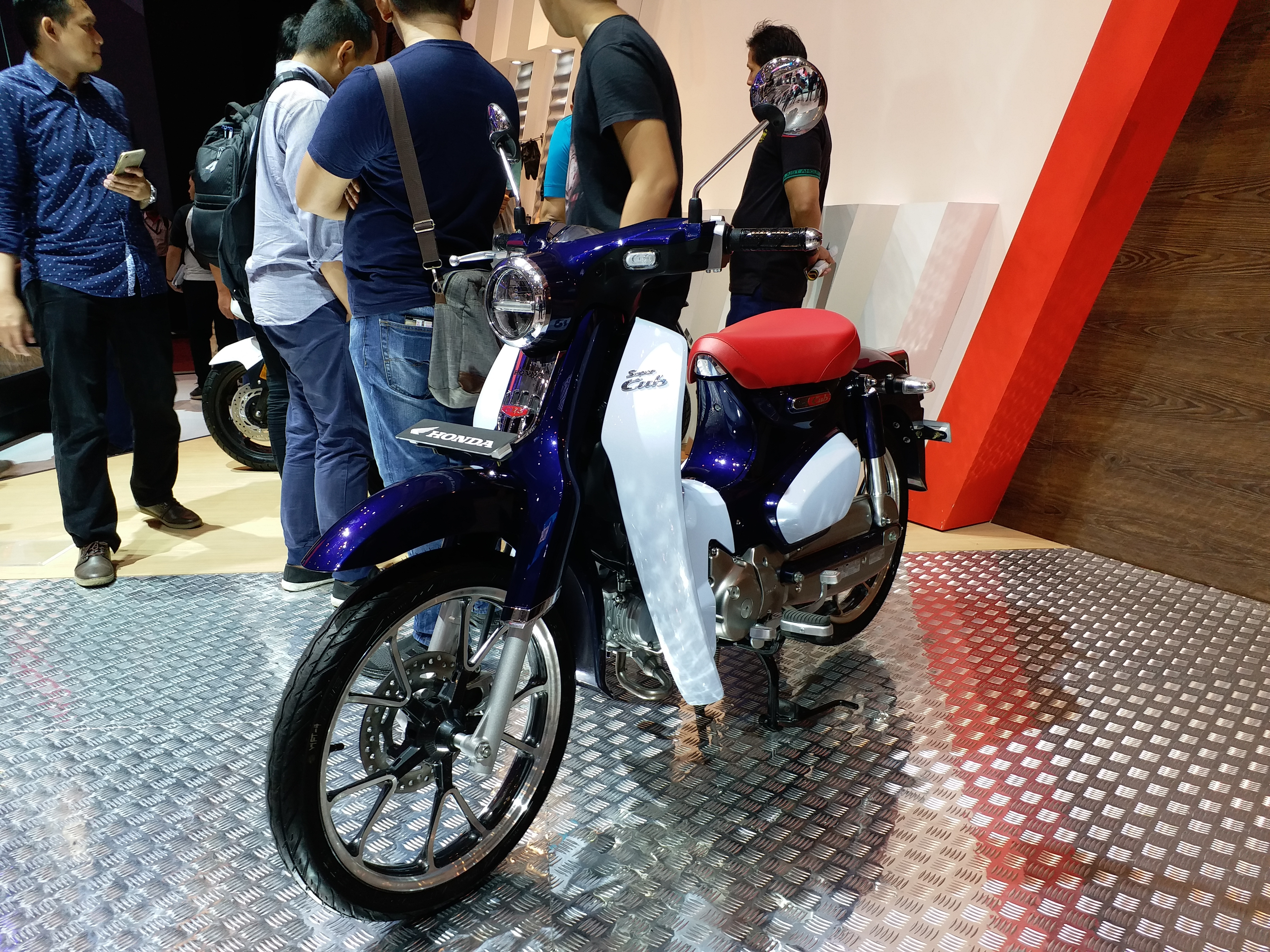
2018 Honda Super Cub C125

=== Sports Cub ===
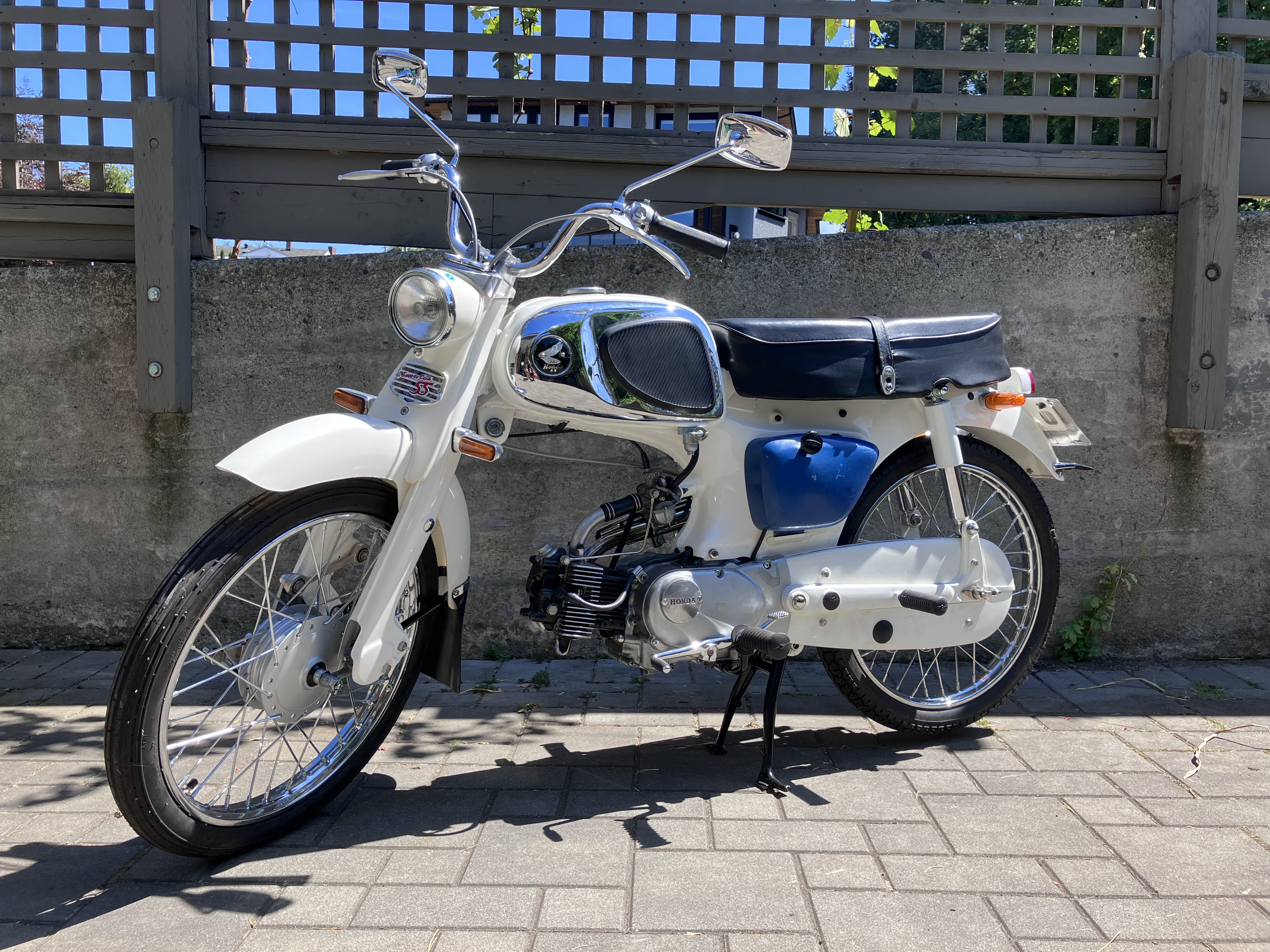
The 1964 Honda 55, also called the C115, used a pressed steel sports bike frame like the C110, C111 and C114 but with a 55cc engine

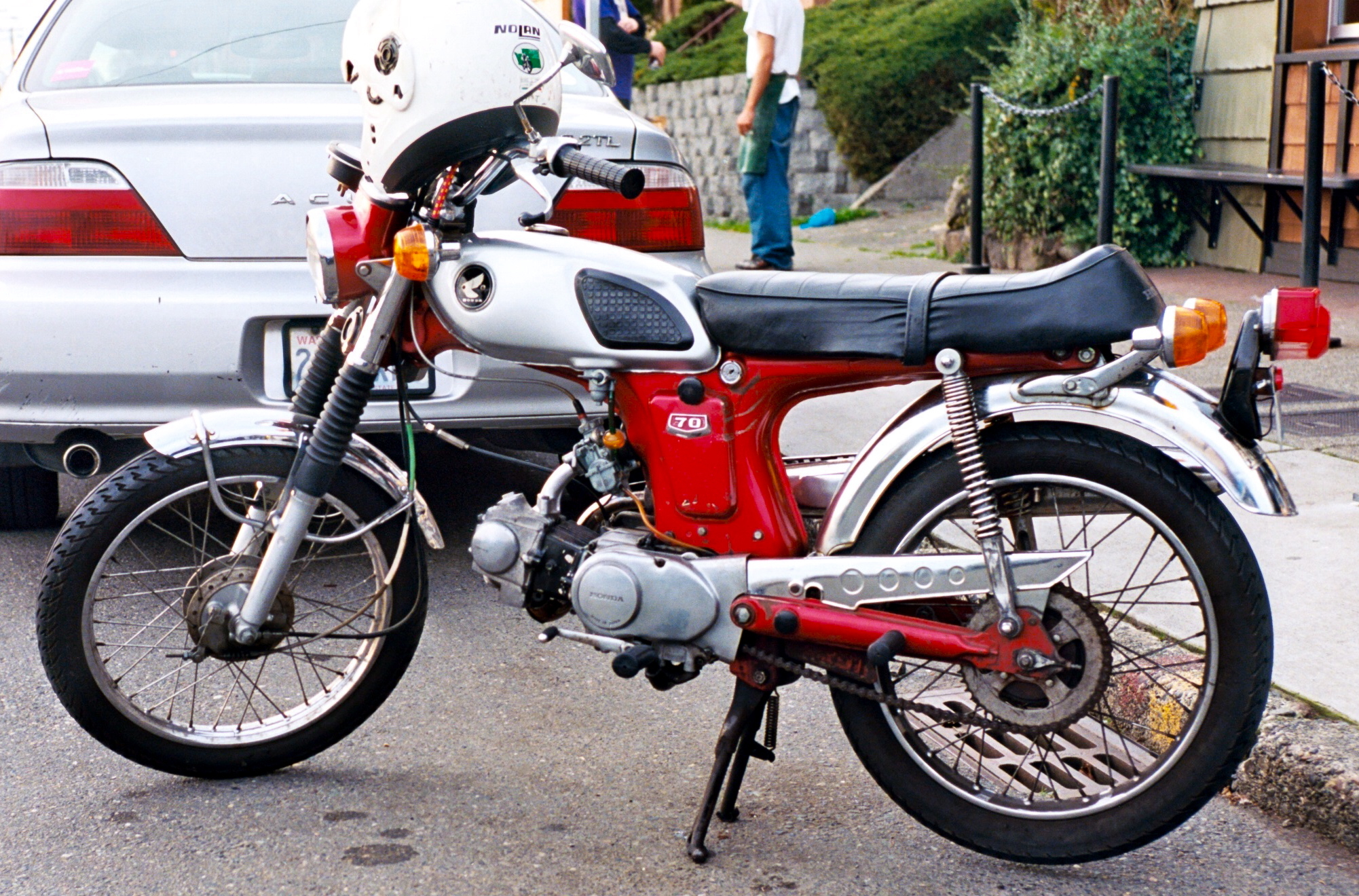
The 1969 Honda 70, also called the CL70, used a sports frame different from the C110 and the same as the CD65, with the engine of the C70

The C110 Sports Cub debuted in October 1960 and shared the basic engine design of the Sports Cub although only the C111 used the same semi-automatic transmission, the other models of Sports Cub all using a manual transmission with hand operated clutch. The C110, C111, C114 and C115 were sport motorcycles that the rider had to straddle, not a step-through scooter as the Super Cub. It had a different frame, with the fuel tank on top of the frame and in front of the seat, and the frame's pressed steel spine ran horizontally from the head tube to the seat. It also had a bit more power, increased from 3.4 to 3.7 kW (4.5 to 5 bhp) at 9,500 rpm. Sub-variants of the Sports Cub were the C111, absent the pillion seat, and C110D, also called C114, which had a low exhaust pipe and the C115 (not available in the US) with a 55cc engine and Sports Cub 55 horn grill and Honda 55 tank insignia.

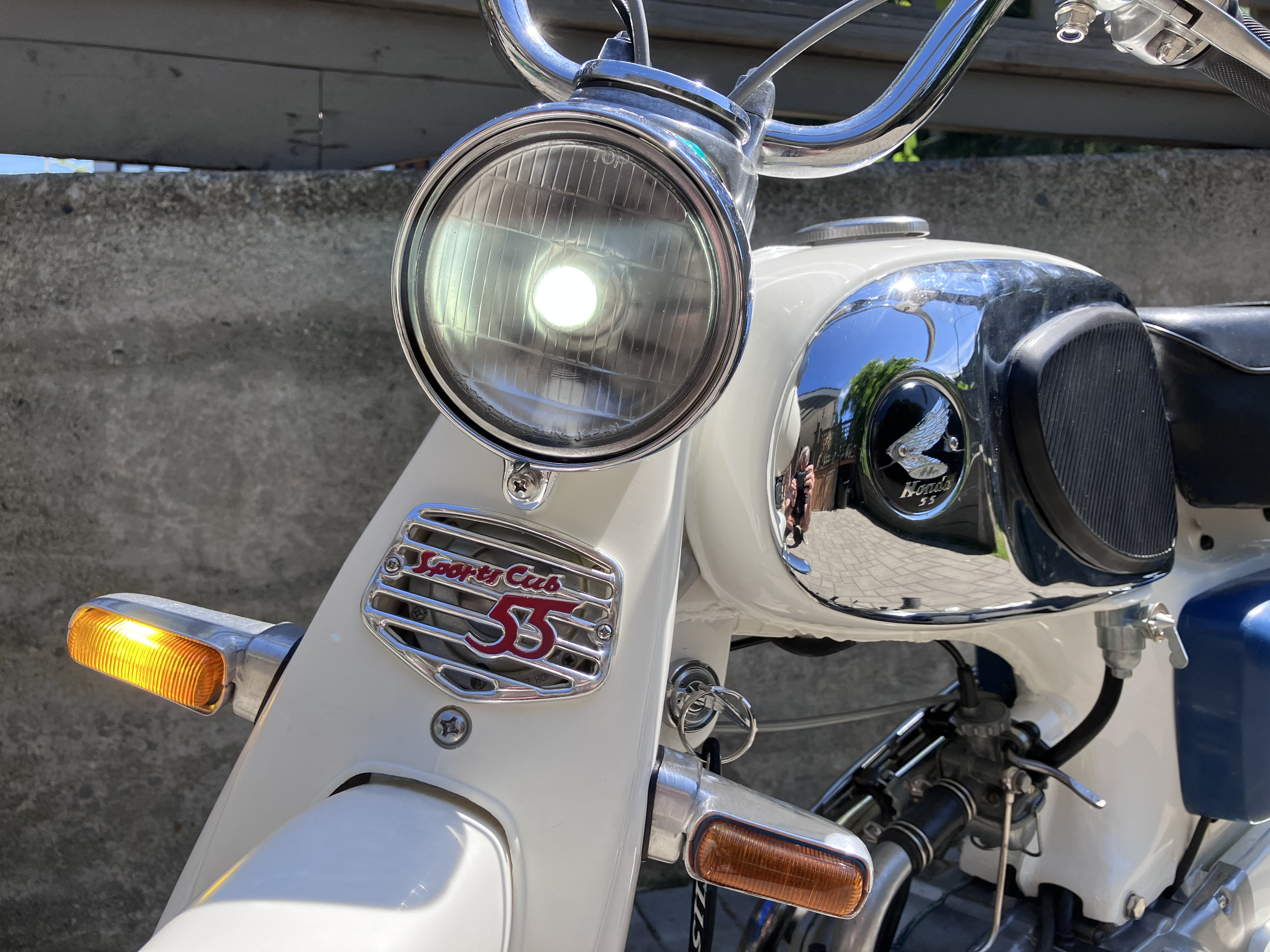
The unique horn grill and the Canadian Market tank emblems of the C115

Early versions of the Sports Cub had a 3-speed gearbox but later this was changed to 4 speed. The C110 Sports Cub through 1966.

In 1963 came an enlarged OHV engine of 86.7 cc (5.29 cu in) and 4.8 kW (6.5 bhp). It was used first in the C200, which had a frame like the C110, with more upright handlebars.

The S65's last year of production was 1967, and the CD65 and CL65 took its place for only one year, 1968. These had the higher-revving 4.6 kW (6.2 bhp) 63 cc (3.8 cu in) engine of the CS65. Then the 4.6 kW (6.2 bhp) 71.8 cc (4.38 cu in) C70 replaced the C65 and CL65 in 1969. It had the same peak horsepower, but at 9,000 rpm instead of 10,000, and more torque, 0.53 kg⋅m (5.2 N⋅m; 3.8 lbf⋅ft) at 7,000 rpm instead of 0.48 kg⋅m (4.7 N⋅m; 3.5 lbf⋅ft) at 8,000 rpm. It was introduced in the US, Canada and Asia at launch and in the UK in 1972.

=== Mini bikes ===
In 1960 the CZ100 arrived, using the same engine in a much smaller frame with only 5″ wheels. First of the Honda Z series, the CZ100 was meant only as a short-distance novelty or paddock bike, but instead found popularity in the monkey bike niche.

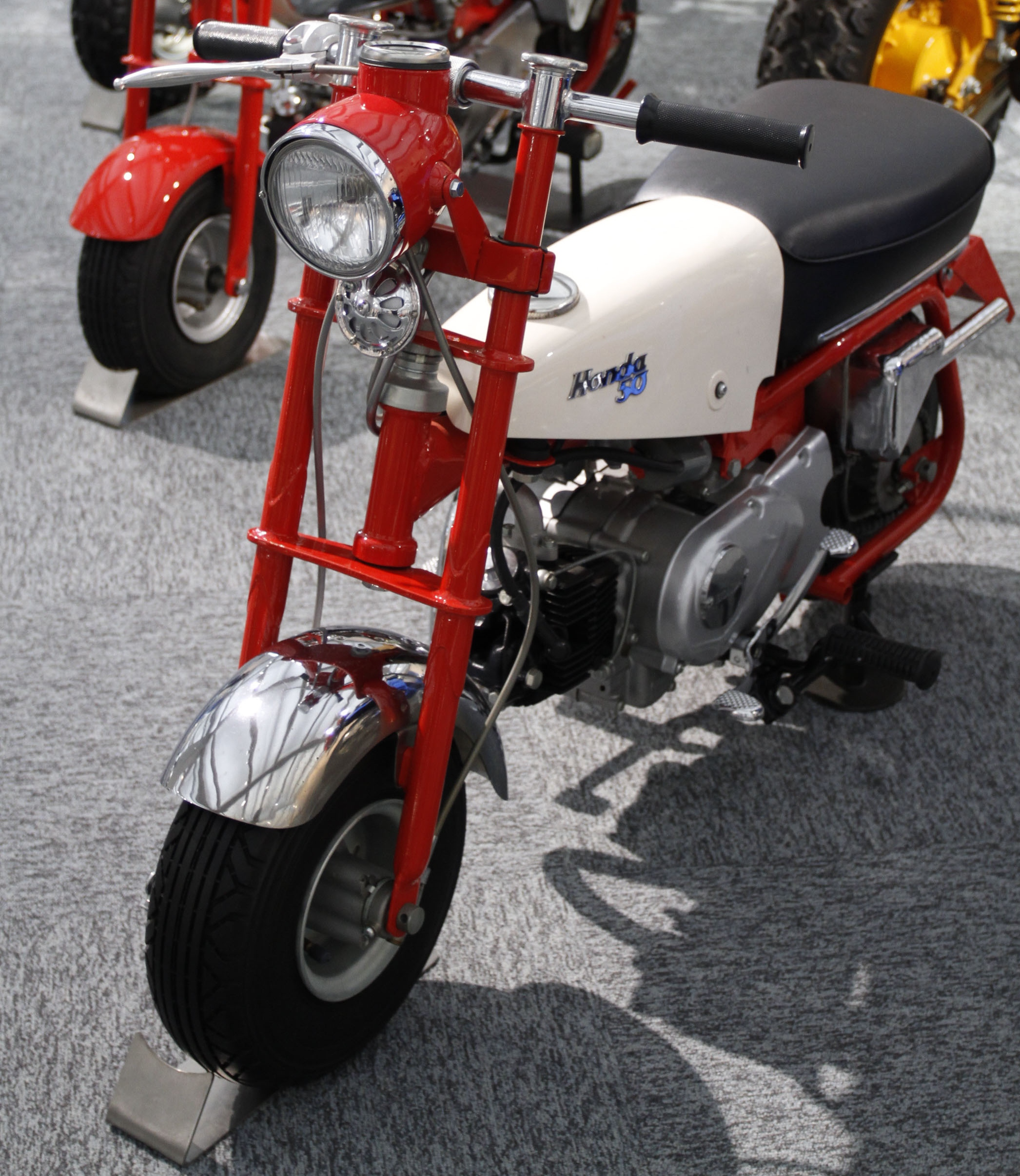
Honda Z100 Monkey in the Honda Collection Hall

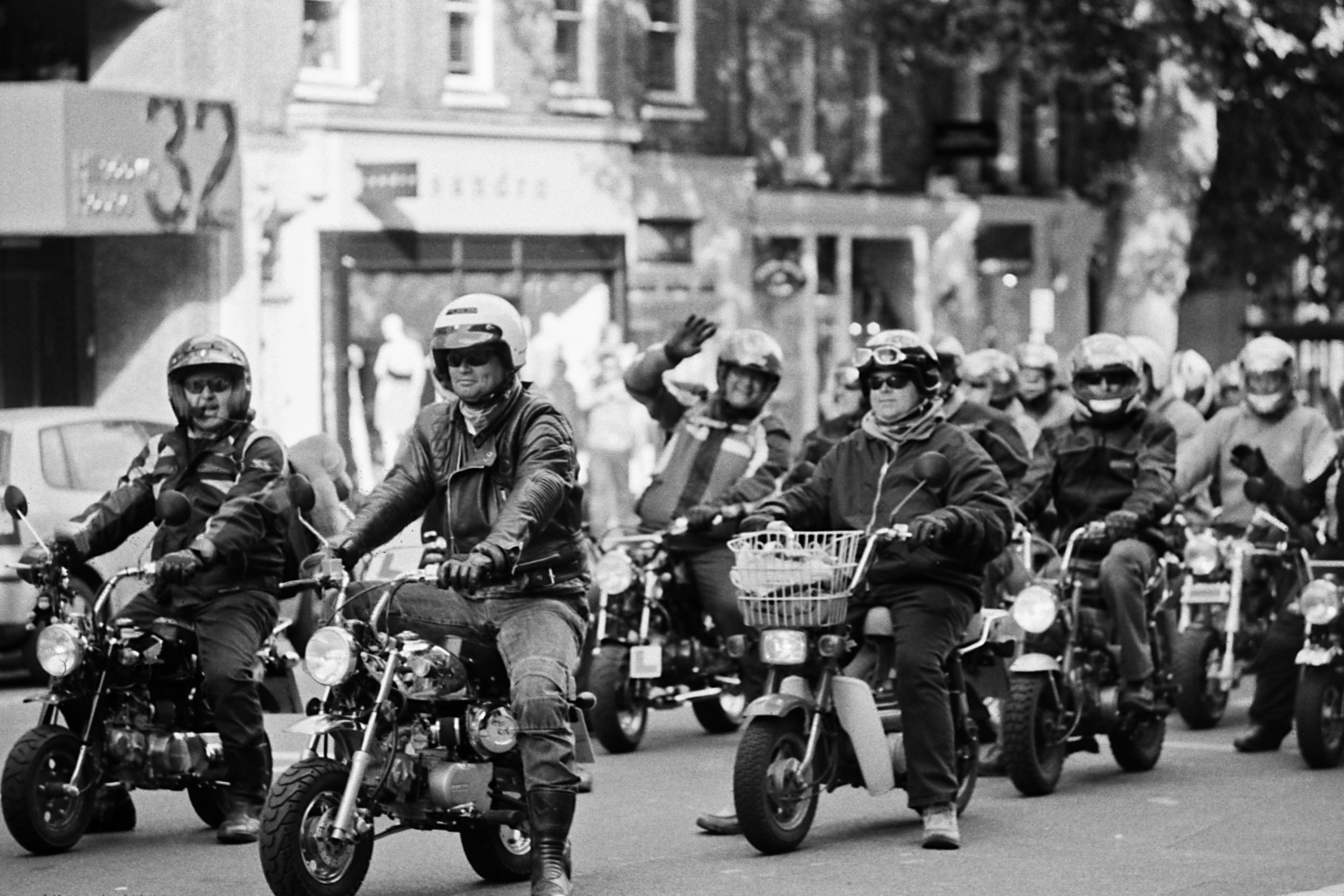
A group of Honda monkey bike riders

=== Trail ===
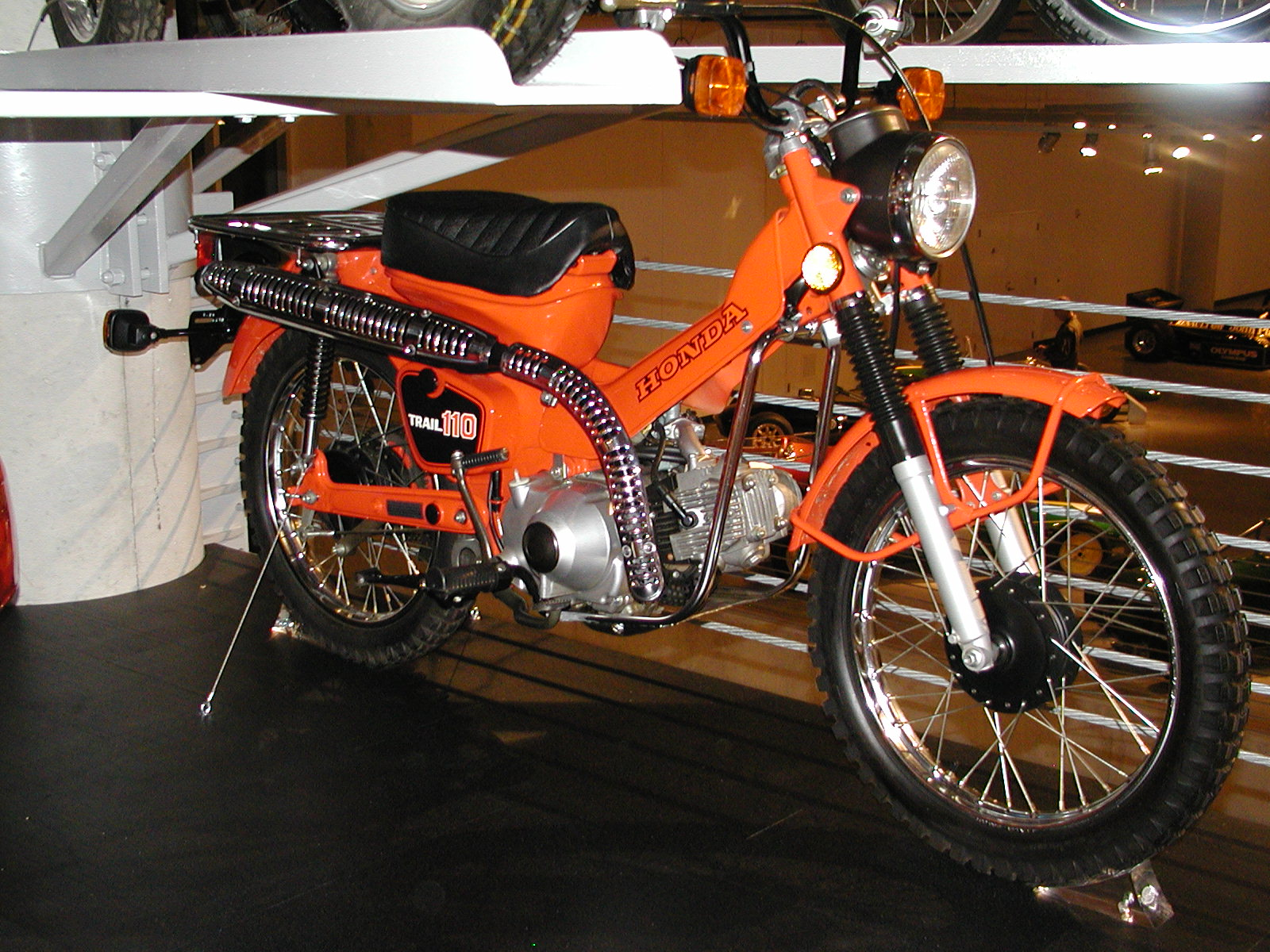
A Honda CT110 Trail 110 Hunter Cub, produced from 1981 to 2000

An on- and off-road version of the Super Cub, what today would be classed as a dual-sport motorcycle but called a trail bike at the time, the CA100T Trail 50, came out in 1961. Jack McCormack, the first national sales manager of American Honda Motor Company, said the Trail 50, and even more so the later Honda CB77, was the result of Honda's willingness to listen to and respond customer demand. "When you talk about Japanese manufacturers, their strength (besides the quality of their equipment) was that they listened to the marketplace. People always suggest that it was about Japanese management, but, to be frank, I was never impressed with Japanese management. They did what no other motorcycle maker did—they listened."

In 1960, McCormack noticed that one Honda dealer in Boise, Idaho was selling more Honda 50s than the combined total of all six dealers in Los Angeles. He found out that the Idaho dealer, Herb Uhl,^{†} was selling the CA100s as a trail bike by adding knobby tires for off-road traction and a "cheater sprocket", that is, increasing the final drive ratio by using a larger rear sprocket with more teeth, which increased the effective torque of the rear wheel, trading off lower top speed as a result. Uhl said the advantages of light weight and the automatic clutch allowed unskilled riders to enjoy off-road riding, in comparison to traditional big trail bikes that could be difficult to handle. McCormack shipped a version of Uhl's customized CA100 to Japan and requested Honda put it into production, and by March 1961 the Trail 50 was available to US dealers. Cycle World praised the simple pleasure of trail riding on the new bike, and it was a US sales success.

== Specifications ==
| | C100 | C102 | C50 | C70 | C86 | C90 | C100EX | Super Cub 50 | Super Cub 110 | Dream 110i | Super Cub C125 | Super Cub 50 |
|---|---|---|---|---|---|---|---|---|---|---|---|---|
| Model years | 1958–1967 | 1960–1965 | 1966–1980+ | 1969–1980+ | | 1966–1980+ | 1986– | 2007– 2016 | 2009– | 2011– | 2018– | 2018– |
| Notes | | Electric start | | Passport in U.S. (1980–1983) | C86 Deluxe Malaysia Limited | | EX5 Dream in Thailand and Malaysia, Astrea (Prima, Grand, Impressa, and Legenda) in Indonesia | PGM-FI | | | PGM-FI with automatic enrichment | |
| Engine | 49 cc (3.0 cu in) OHV air-cooled single | | 49.5 cc (3.02 cu in) | 71.8 cc (4.38 cu in) | 86 cc (5.2 cu in) | 89.5 cc (5.46 cu in) OHC | 97 cc (5.9 cu in) OHC | 49 cc (3.0 cu in) OHC | 109.1 cc (6.66 cu in) OHC | | 124.9 cc (7.62 cu in) OHC | |
| Bore x stroke | 40 mm × 39 mm (1.6 in × 1.5 in) | | 39 mm × 41.4 mm (1.54 in × 1.63 in) | 47 mm × 41.4 mm (1.85 in × 1.63 in) | 47 mm × 49.5 mm (1.85 in × 1.95 in) | 50 mm × 45.6 mm (1.97 in × 1.80 in) | 50 mm × 49.5 mm (1.97 in × 1.95 in) | 39.0 mm × 41.4 mm (1.54 in × 1.63 in) | 50 mm × 55.6 mm (1.97 in × 2.19 in) | | 52.4 mm × 57.9 mm (2.1 in × 2.3 in) | |
| Compression | 8.5:1 | | 8.8:1* | | 9.2:1 | 8.2:1 | 8.8:1 | 10:1 | 9.0:1 | | 9.3:1 | 10.0 |
| Top speed | 69 km/h (43 mph) | | | | 100 km/h (62 mph) | | 110.00 km/h (68.35 mph) | | | | | |
| Power | 3.4 kW (4.5 bhp) @9500 rpm | | 3.6 kW (4.8 bhp) @ 10000 rpm | 4.5 kW (6 bhp) @ 9000 rpm | | 5.6 kW (7.5 bhp) @ 9500 rpm | 5.9 kW (8.0 PS) @ 8000 rpm | 2.5 kW (3.4 hp) @ 7000 rpm | 6.0 kW (8.0 hp) @ 7500 rpm | | 6.76 kW (9.1 hp; 9.2 PS) @ 7,500 rpm | |
| Torque | 0.33 kg⋅m (3.2 N⋅m; 2.4 lbf⋅ft) @8500 rpm | | | 0.53 kg⋅m (5.2 N⋅m; 3.8 lbf⋅ft) @ 7000 rpm | | 0.67 kg⋅m (6.6 N⋅m; 4.8 lbf⋅ft) @ 6000 rpm | 0.83 kg⋅m (8.1 N⋅m; 6.0 lbf⋅ft) @ 6000 rpm | 3.8 N⋅m (2.8 lbf⋅ft) @ 5000 rpm | 8.4 N⋅m (6.2 lbf⋅ft) @ 5500 rpm | | 9.79 N⋅m (7.2 lbf⋅ft) @ 5,000 rpm | 3.8 N.m (0.39 lbfft) 5,500 rpm |
| Ignition | Flywheel magneto | Coil | Magneto | | | | CDI | | | | Fully transistorized | |
| Transmission | 3 speed wet centrifugal clutch semi-automatic transmission | | 3 spd. | | | | 4 spd. | 3 spd. | 4 spd. | | 4-speed | |
| Frame | Pressed steel underbone | | | | | | | | | | Steel backbone | |
| Suspension | Front: leading link 56 mm (2.2 in) travel, rear: swingarm 61 mm (2.4 in) travel | | | | | | Telescopic fork, swingarm | Front: leading link 56 mm (2.2 in) travel, rear: swingarm 61 mm (2.4 in) travel | Telescopic fork, swingarm | | | |
| Brakes | Front & rear 110 mm (4.3 in) drum | | | | | | | | | | Front: Single-piston caliper with single 220 mm (8.7 in) disc; Rear: Mechanical drum | |
| Tires (front/rear) | 2.25" x 17"/2.25" x 17" | | | 2.25×17"/ 2.5×17" | | 2.5×17"/ 2.5×17" | 2.25×17"/ 2.5×17" | 2.25×17"/ 2.75×14" | 2.25×17"/ 2.50×17" | 70/90-17 M/C 38P; 80/90-17 M/C 50P | 70/90-17; 80/90-17 | 60/100-17 60/100-17 |
| Rake, trail | | | | 71 mm (2.8 in) | | | 26° 30', 75 mm (3.0 in) | 26°, 47 mm (1.9 in) | | 26° 30', 75 mm (3.0 in) | 26.5°, 71.12 mm (2.8 in) | 26° 30', 75 mm (3.0 in) |
| Wheelbase | 1,180 mm (46.5 in) | | | | | 46.7 in (1,185 mm) | 1,190 mm (46.9 in) | 1,185 mm (46.7 in) | | 1,212 mm (47.7 in) | 1,243 mm (48.9 in) | 1,210 mm (47.6 in) |
| Length | 1,780 mm (70.1 in) | 1,810 mm (71.2 in) | 1,800 mm (70.7 in) | | | 1,800 mm (72 in) | 1,835 mm (72.2 in) | 1,775 mm (69.9 in) | 1,830 mm (72 in) | 1,915 mm (75.4 in) | 1,910 mm (75.2 in) | 1,860 mm (73.2 in) |
| Width | 570 mm (22.6 in) | | 640 mm (25.2 in) | | | | 670 mm (26 in) | 660 mm (26 in) | 710 mm (28 in) | 696 mm (27.4 in) | 718 mm (28.3 in) | 695 mm (27.3 in)622 |
| Height | 610 mm (24 in) | | | 760 mm (29.9 in) | | | 1,035 mm (40.7 in) | 960 mm (38 in) | 1,040 mm (41 in) | 1,052 mm (41.4 in) | 1,002 mm (39.4 in) | 1,040 mm (40.9 in) |
| Seat height | | | | | | | 760 mm (30 in) | 705 mm (27.8 in) | 735 mm (28.9 in) | 745 mm (29.3 in) | 780 mm (30.7 in) | 735 mm (28.9 in) |
| Dry weight | 65 kg (143 lb) | 70 kg (154 lb) | 69 kg (152 lb) | 72 kg (158 lb) | 75 kg (165 lb) | 85 kg (187 lb) | 93 kg (205 lb) | 79 kg (174 lb) | 93 kg (205 lb) | 99 kg (218 lb) | 107 kg (236 lb) | 96 kg (211 lb) |
| Fuel capacity | 3 L (0.66 imp gal; 0.79 US gal) | | | 4.8 L (1.1 imp gal; 1.3 US gal) | | | 3.6 L (0.79 imp gal; 0.95 US gal) | 3.4 L (0.75 imp gal; 0.90 US gal) | 4.3 L (0.95 imp gal; 1.1 US gal) | 4.2 L (0.92 imp gal; 1.1 US gal) | 3.7 L (0.81 imp gal; 0.98 US gal) | 4.3 L (0.95 imp gal;1.1 US gal) |

== Current popularity ==
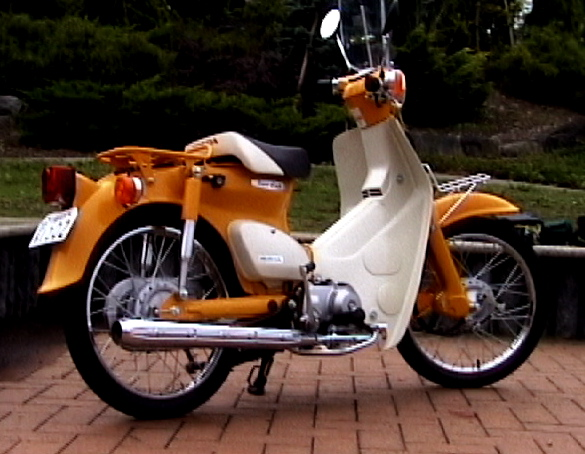
Honda Super Cub "Street" model 50 cc

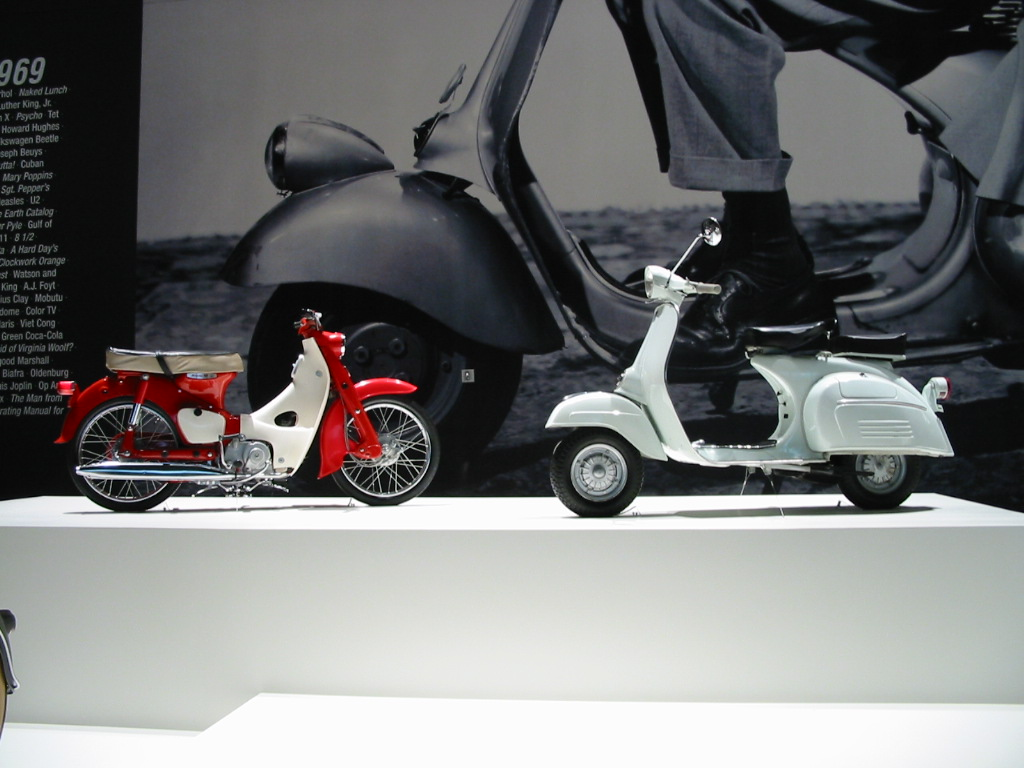
The Art of the Motorcycle at the Guggenheim Las Vegas

Sales for Super Cubs have increased in Japan with upgrades to the engine and the installation of fuel injection for Japanese domestic market models starting from 2007, making it more powerful, more economical and cleaner. With respect to newer, plastic body underbone designs, such as the Wave, the original Cub remains popular.

Cycle World magazine's Peter Egan and Steve Kimball entered a stock Honda C70 Passport in the 1981 Craig Vetter Fuel Economy Challenge, competing against specially designed high-mileage two-wheelers built by teams of engineering students, and an entry from American Honda. The course was a 65-mile (105 km) loop near San Luis Obispo that had to be completed in 1 hour and 40 minutes, give or take 10 minutes, meaning an average speed of 35 mph (56 km/h). Kimball, riding the Passport, won the event through skillful and error-free riding, with 198 miles per US gallon (1.19 L/100 km; 238 mpg_{‑imp}).

By 2002 in Vietnam, Super Cubs had been the predominant model of motorcycle taxi for so long that "Honda" had become a genericized trademark or metonymy for any motorcycle taxi, equivalent to "xe ôm". In the English speaking world as well, "Honda" was often a synonym for "motorcycle" as a result of the ubiquity of the Super Cub.

The Super Cub was included in The Guggenheim's 1998 The Art of the Motorcycle exhibition. In 2006, on the Discovery Channel's The Greatest Ever series, an episode on motorcycles placed the 1958 49 cc Super Cub in first place. James May, a co-presenter on the popular television series Top Gear, bought a Honda Super Cub for the 2008 Season 12 Vietnam special. Author Roland Brown wrote that, "of all the brilliant bikes Honda have built — the CB750 superbike, Mike Hailwood's six-cylinder racers, the mighty Gold Wing, you name them — the most important of all is the C100 Super Cub of 1958."

In 2014, the Super Cub became the first vehicle in Japan to be granted a three-dimensional trademark.

Super Cub, a Japanese light novel series featuring prominently the Honda Super Cub, has been running since 2017. An anime adaptation was released in 2021.

In June, 2018, Honda announced that, after an absence of 45 years, the 2019 Super Cub C125 model would once again be available in the US.

In February, 2026, Honda confirmed the 2024 Super Cub C125 was the final model year sold in the US stating that "any potential return of the Super Cub would depend on ongoing product planning and market considerations."

=== Licensed models ===
Symba 100
- Manufacturer: SYM Motors
- Also called: Symba 110
- Assembly: Taiwan
- Engine: 101.4 cc (6.19 cu in), air cooled, four stroke, OHV, single
- Compression ratio: 9.6:1
- Top speed: 90 km/h (56 mph) (claimed)
- Power: 4.8 kW (6.5 hp) at 8500 rpm
- Torque: 6.8 N⋅m (5 lb⋅ft) at 8500 rpm
- Transmission: Wet multi-plate clutch, 4 speed semi-automatic transmission
- Frame type: Pressed steel underbone
- Suspension: Front: telescopic fork, rear: swingarm
- Brakes: Front: 130 mm (5.1 in), rear: 110 mm (4.3 in)
- Tires: Front and rear: 2.50-17"
- Wheelbase: 1,225 mm (48.22 in)
- Dimensions: L: 1,900 mm (75 in); W: 690 mm (27 in); H: 1,000 mm (41 in)
- Seat height: 760 mm (29.9 in)
- Weight: 95 kg (209 lb) (claimed) (wet)
- Fuel capacity: 1.08 US gal (4.1 L; 0.90 imp gal)

Chongqing DY Tech Co., Ltd. of China, known as Kamax, has a line of motorcycles based on the Super Cub Design, including the Cub Pro 125, Cub Pro 50, Cub Pro 150. This super cub 'remake' was developed solely for the American market, Southeast Asian market. Super Motor Company which is the sole European distributor of the EEC Super Cub sells three different variations, the Super 25, the Super 50, and the Super 100. From 2009 to 2010, Flyscooters imported a Yinxiang Super Cub variant to the US, under the name Fly Scout. Similarly, China Jialing Industrial Co. Ltd. has ten models based on Honda's Super Cub design, including the JL50Q-2 and JL90-1 which are faithful to the original 1958 styling, as well as several more modern restyling. Lifan Group exports a version to the UK, the 97 cc (5.9 cu in) LF100, which has telescopic forks, a four-speed gearbox and a digital gear indicator.

SYM Motors of Taiwan licensed the Super Cub design as the Symba 100, previously called the Symba 110, which they exported to the US between 2009 and 2016. While keeping the basic design, SYM increased the size of the front brake from 110 to 130 mm (4.3 to 5.1 in) and added an LED fuel gauge. Instead of leading link front forks, it has telescopic forks. The Symba engine had a carbureted 101.4 cc (6.19 cu in) single claimed to produce 6.5 hp (4.8 kW) at 8500 rpm, with a four speed gearbox using a centrifugal clutch semi-automatic transmission. SYM ended the production of the Symba in 2016.

=== EV-Cub ===
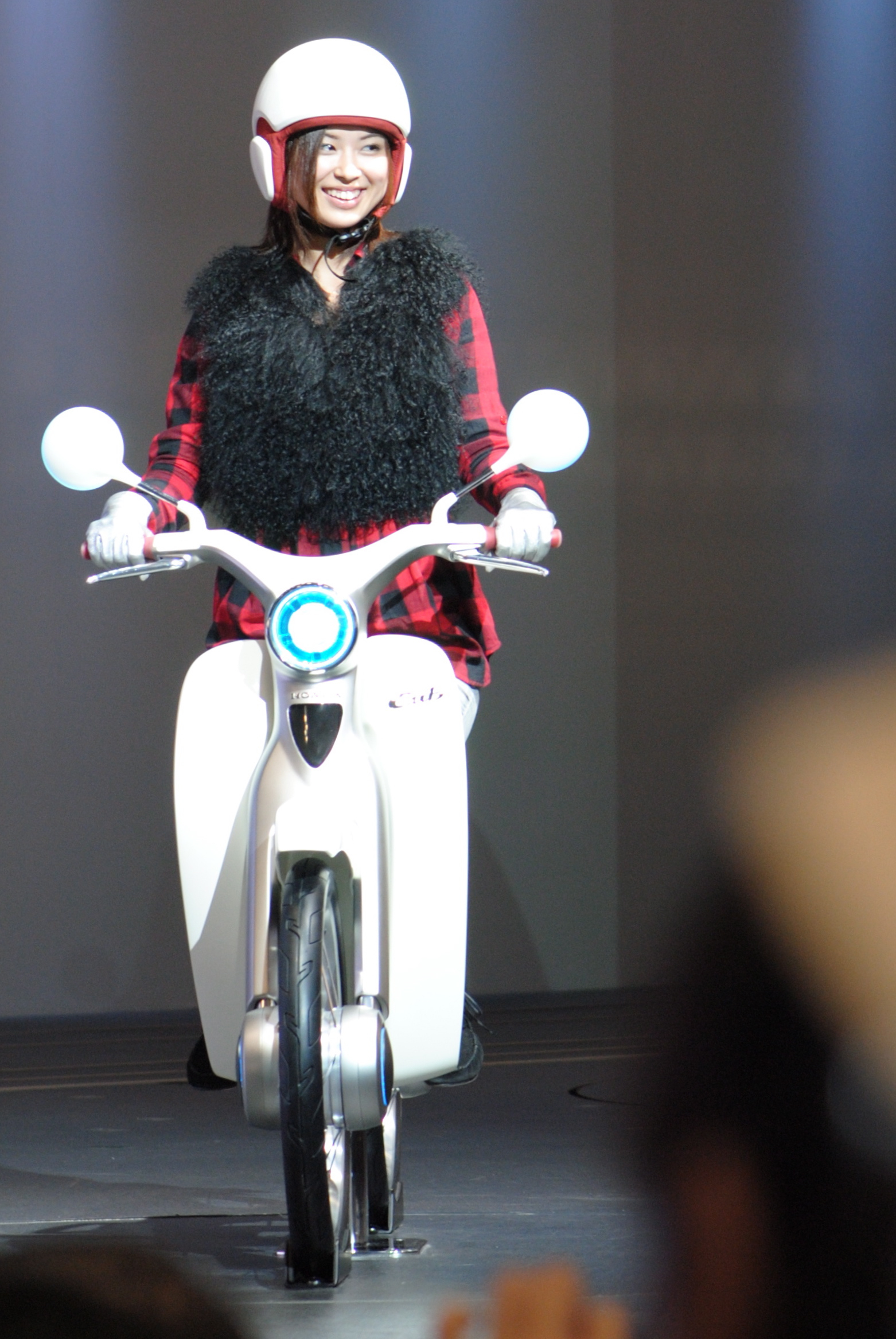
EV-Cub at the 2009 Tokyo Motor Show

At the 2009 Tokyo Motor Show, Honda presented the EV-Cub concept vehicle, an electric motorcycle patterned after the venerable Super Cub, featuring two-wheel drive by means of electric motors mounted in the hubs of each of the wheels. Honda said they felt keeping the 1958 layout for their 21st-century concept bike made sense because, "the human body has not changed in the past 50 years," and, "the size, shape, and position of all the Super Cub parts had a kind of necessity to them, and that the design of the Super Cub was very rational and rider-centric."

Without the engine in the center of the frame or the fuel tank under the seat, there was room for a scooter-style underseat helmet compartment. Integrated with the new electric motorcycle was an interactive communications system, to let riders converse while riding. Several other companies, including Christini, KTM, Öhlins, and Yamaha have done development on two-wheel drive motorcycles, and have found that the addition of power to the front as well as the rear wheel aids in stability, particularly in corners and in the hands of novice riders. At the time Honda hinted that they would bring the EV-Cub to market in 2010. In a 2016 speech, Honda's president and CEO Takahiro Hachigo said they planned to release the EV-Cub in Japan in about two years, followed later in other ASEAN markets.

The Super Cub as cargo hauler

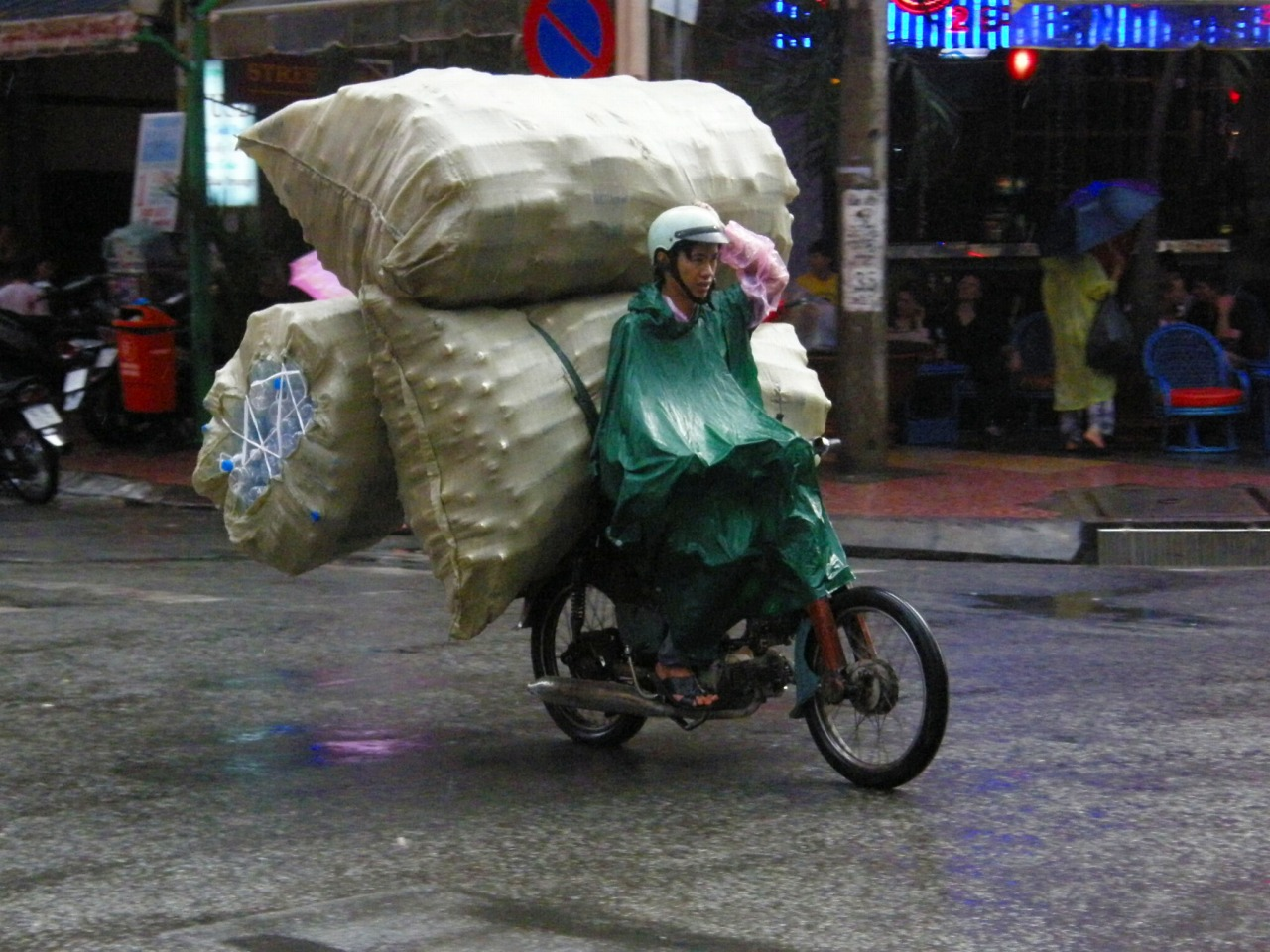
Ho Chi Minh City

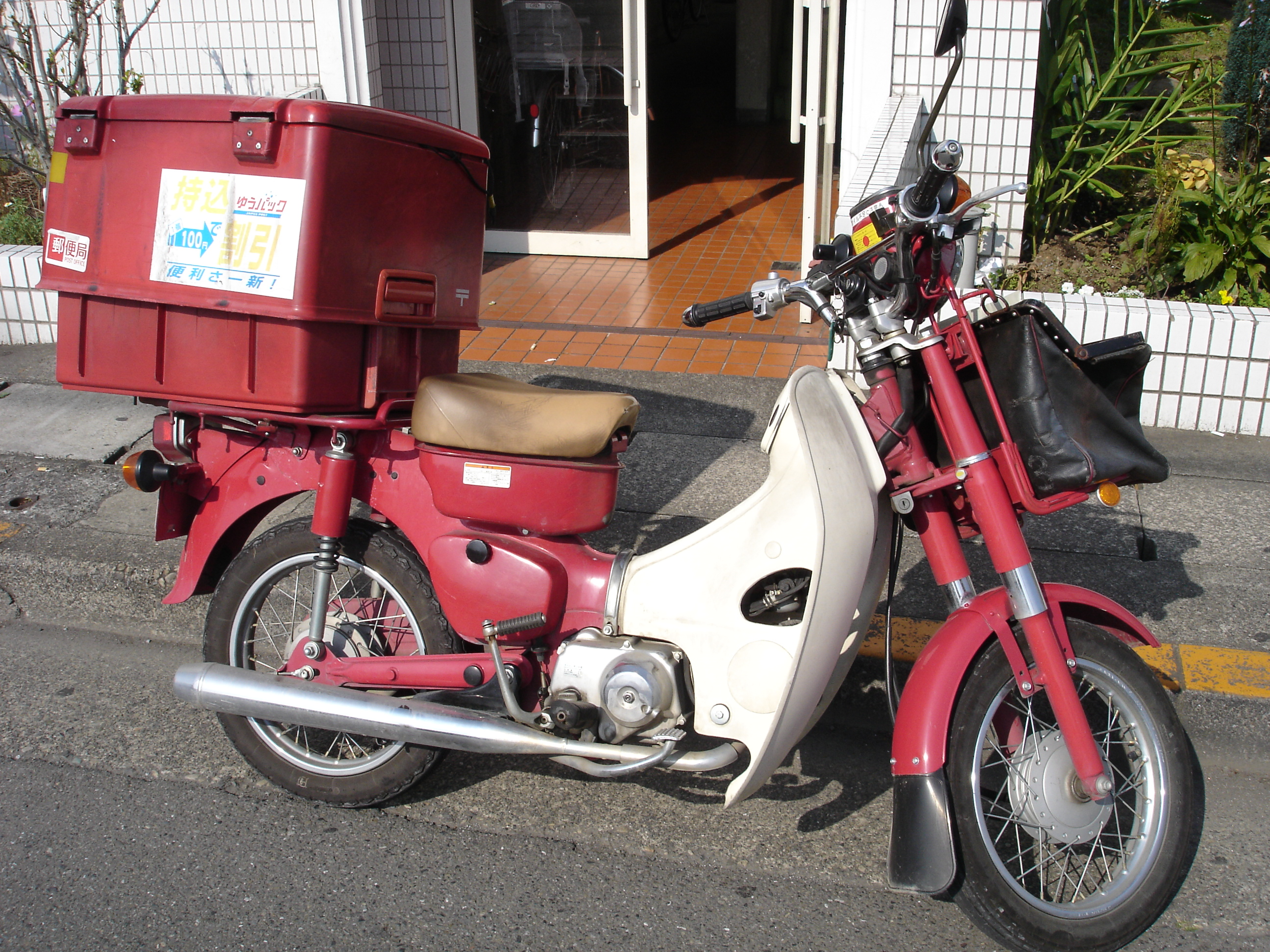
Postal Super Cub

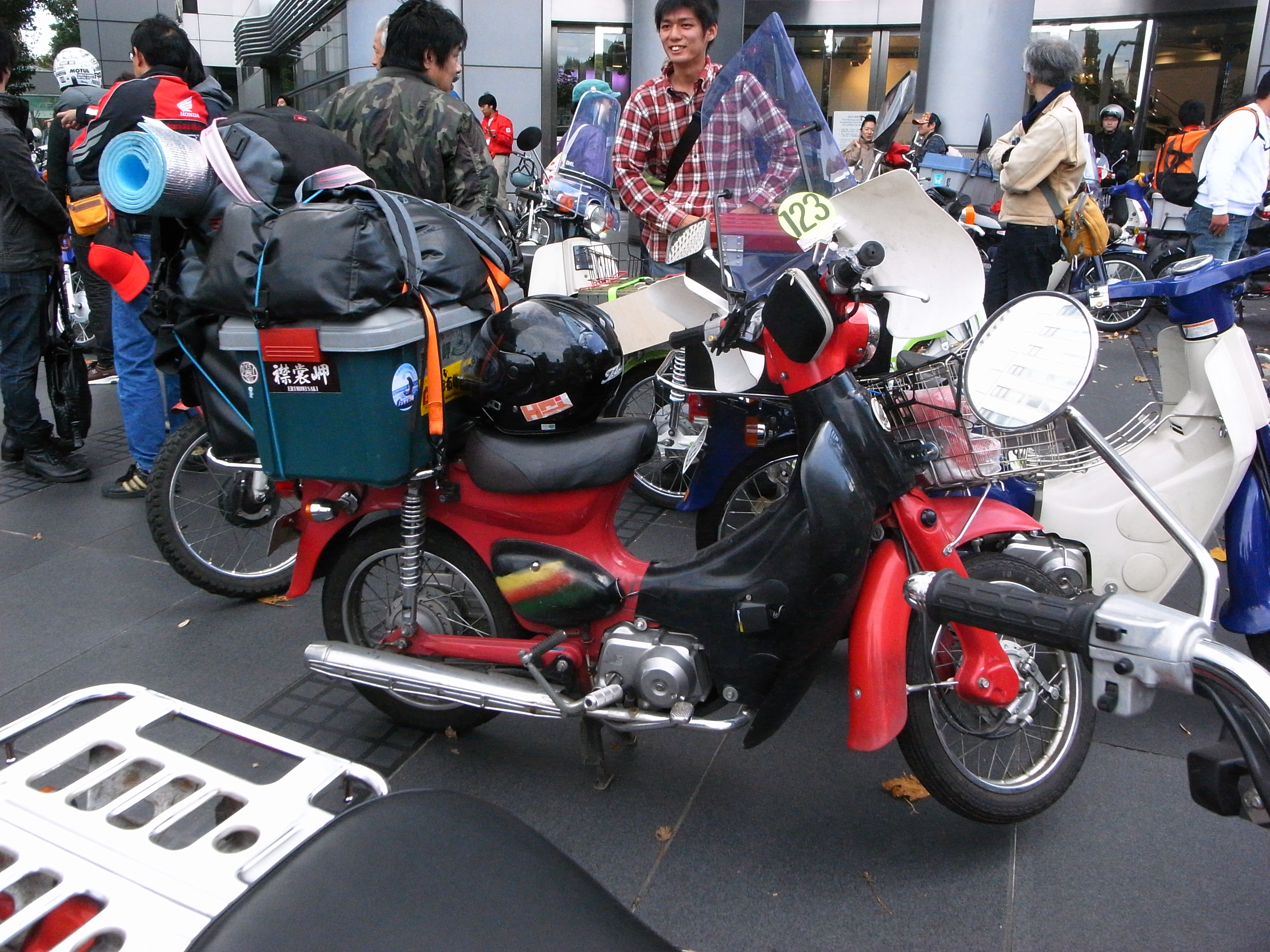
Honda enthusiasts rally

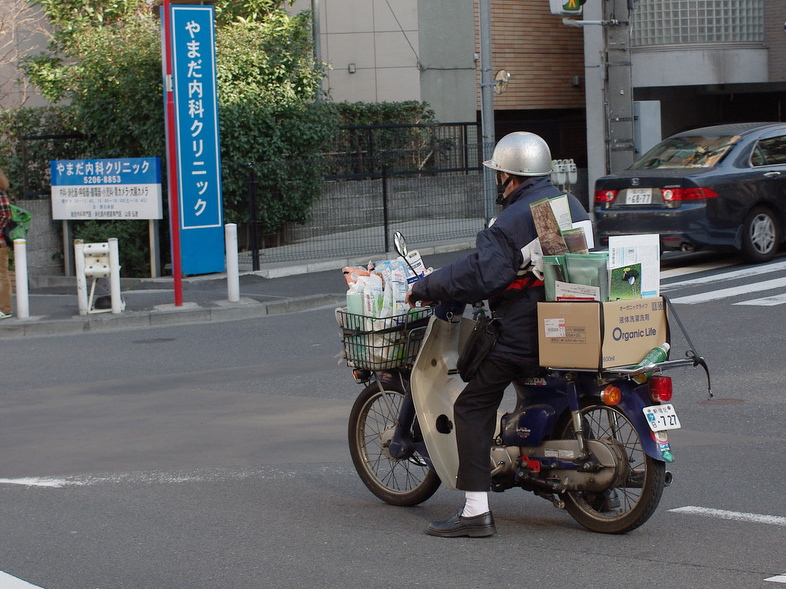
Kagurazaka, Tokyo

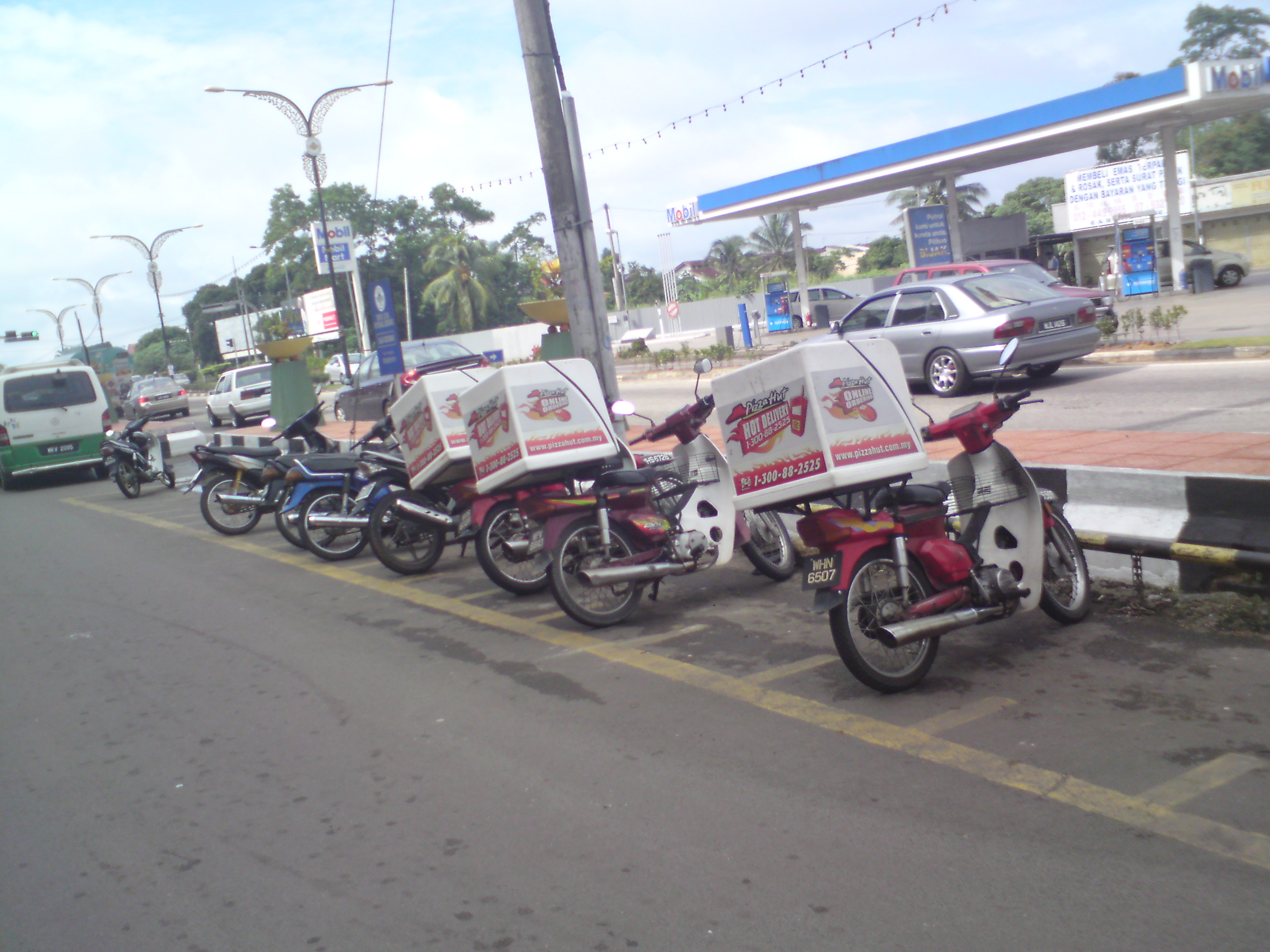
A fleet of Pizza Hut Honda EX5s in Segamat, Malaysia

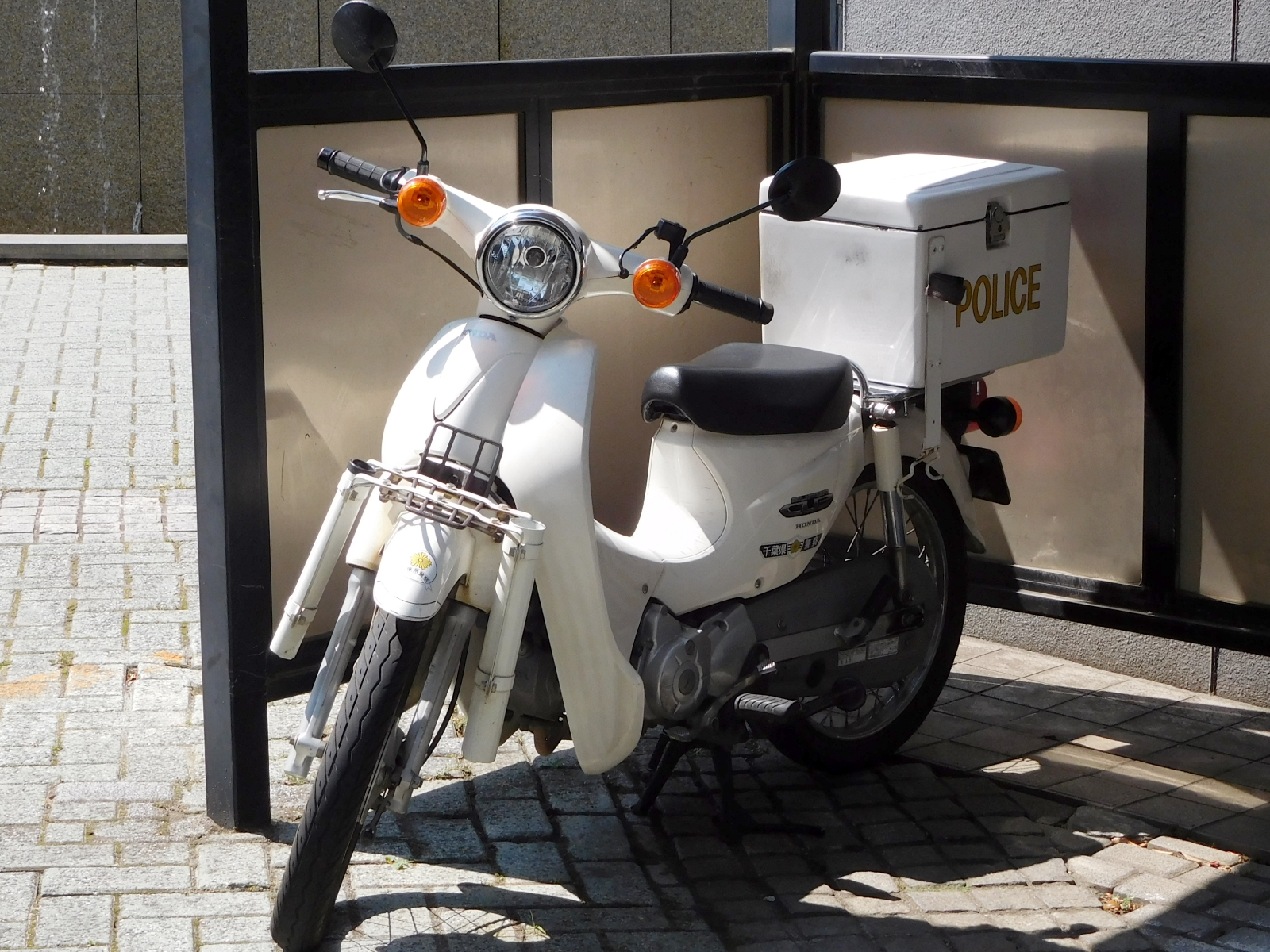
Police bike in Chiba Prefecture

== See also ==
- Yamaha V50 (motorcycle)
- Suzuki FR50
- Honda CT series
- Simson KR 50 — Production has started in 1958 as well

== Explanatory notes ==
* The Chinese Flying Pigeon bicycle, with on the order of 500 million in service as of 2007, is the most produced vehicle ever. See Koeppel, Dan (January–February 2007), "Flight of the Pigeon", Bicycling, vol. 48, no. 1, Rodale, Inc., pp. 60–66, ISSN 0006-2073

† Herb Uhl's son, Billy Uhl, competed alongside his father in the International Six Days Enduro in 1969, won the Gold Medal five times in the 1970s, and was inducted into the American Motorcyclist Association Motorcycle Hall of Fame in 2007.
