= WTQ =

WTQ may refer to:

- Effective torque, also known as wheel torque
- Wet Tropics of Queensland
