= Honda Biz =

Motorcycle brand

Honda Biz KS/ES/+/EX
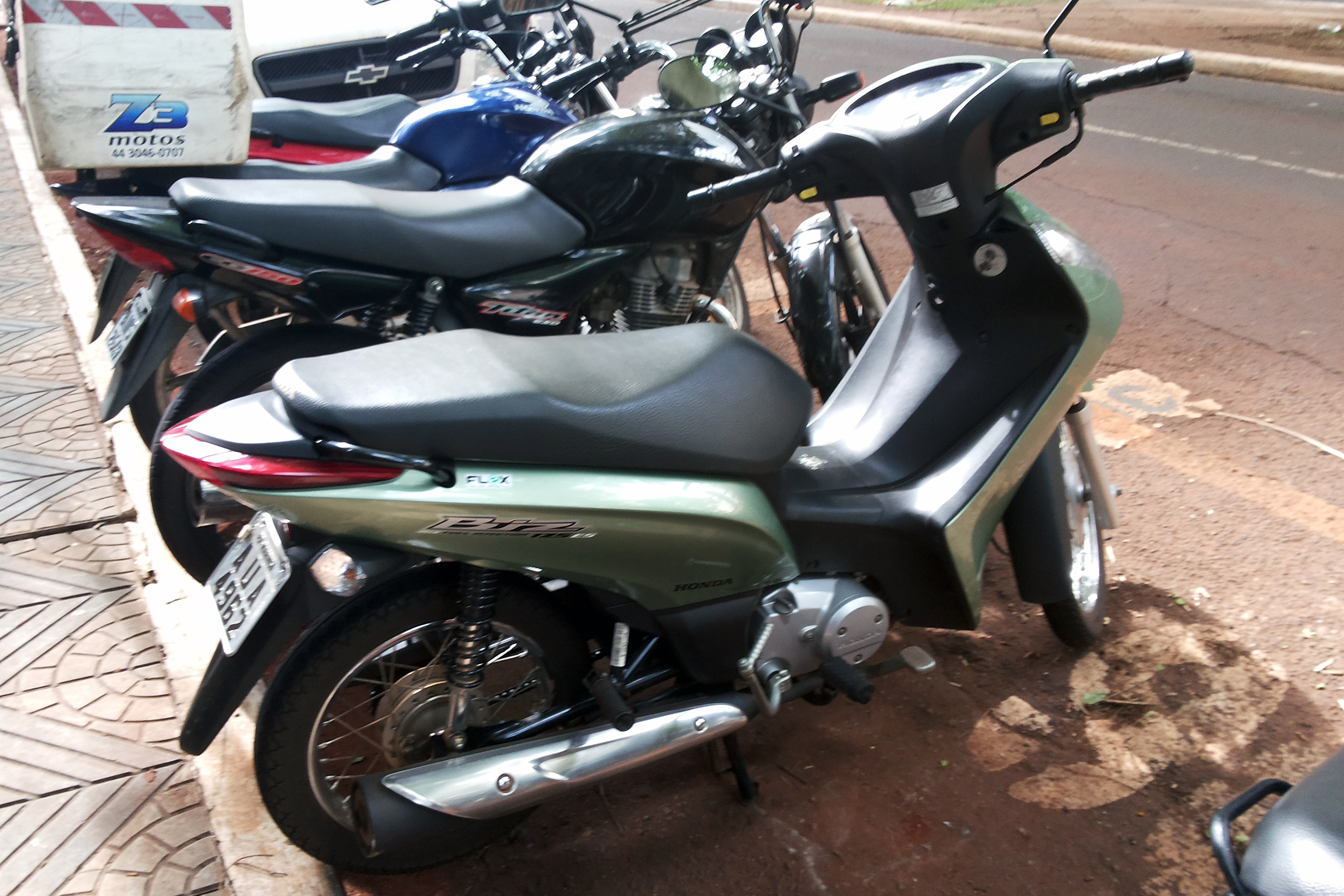
- Honda Biz
- Manufacturer: Honda
- Production: 1998–present
- Predecessor: C100 Dream
- Engine: 97.1 cm^{3}, 109.1 cm^{3} and 124.9 cm^{3}, OHC, Four-stroke
- Power: 6hp 100cc / 9hp 125cc (approximate values may vary by year.)
- Transmission: Semi-automatic, 4 gears, it is possible to move from 4th to neutral with the vehicle stationary.
- Suspension: F – telescopic (90 mm) R – Bishock (86 mm)
- Brakes: F – 130 mm Drum/220 mm Disc (version +/EX) R- 110 mm Drum
- Tires: F- 60/100-17 R – 80/60-14
- Dimensions: H: 1.075 mm
- Related: POP 100/110i

Honda Biz is an underbone motorcycle developed and produced by Honda of Brazil since 1998. It has three types of engine: 100, 110 and 125 cubic centimeters of displacement.

It is an affordable, entry-level model in the country; a variation of the worldwide popular Honda Super Cub, with two key differences: a 14-inch (instead of a 17-inch) rear wheel and a storage compartment under the seat.
