= Yamaha V series =

Series of Japanese motorcycles, 1980–1986

Yamaha V50
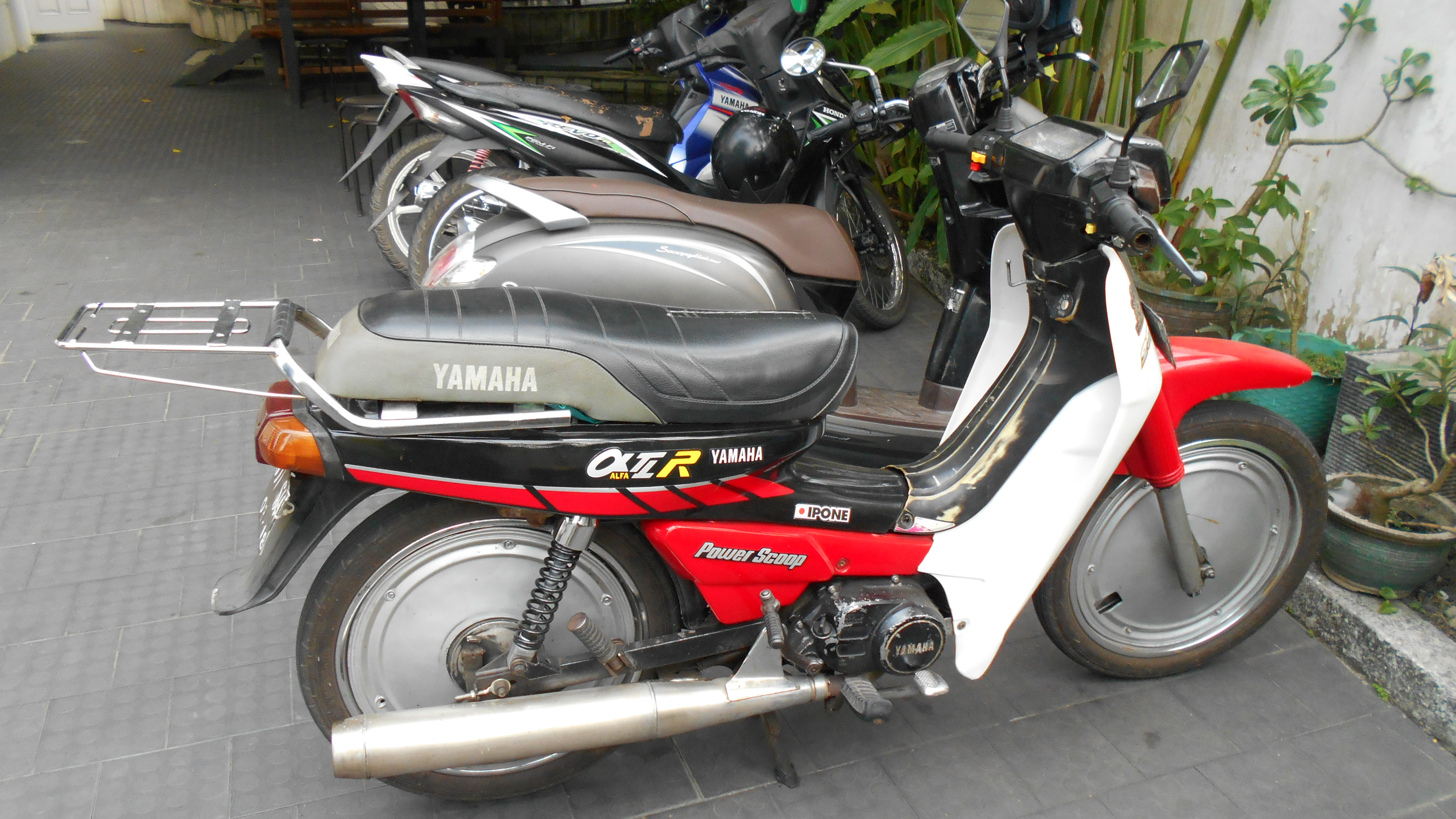
- Manufacturer: Yamaha
- Also called: Yamaha Step-through
- Production: 1980–1986 (for the UK market)
- Class: Underbone
- Engine: 80 cc (4.9 cu in) 2-stroke air-cooled, reed valve, single
- Power: 4.5 bhp (3.4 kW) @ 6,000 rpm (1980 spec.)
- Transmission: 3-speed
- Suspension: Front: leading link Rear: swingarm
- Brakes: Drum
- Dimensions: L: 1.84 m (6 ft 0 in); W: 0.645 m (2 ft 1.4 in); H: 1.005 m (3 ft 3.6 in)
- Weight: 70 kg (150 lb) (dry)
- Fuel capacity: 5.3 L (1.2 imp gal; 1.4 US gal)
- Oil capacity: 1.2 L (0.26 imp gal; 0.32 US gal)

The Yamaha V series are two-stroke step-through motorcycles made by the Yamaha Motor Company. There were a number of different engine capacities to suit different sections of the market. The bike was primarily released to compete with the ever-popular Honda Super Cub. It is also very similar to the Suzuki FR50.

== Model V overview ==
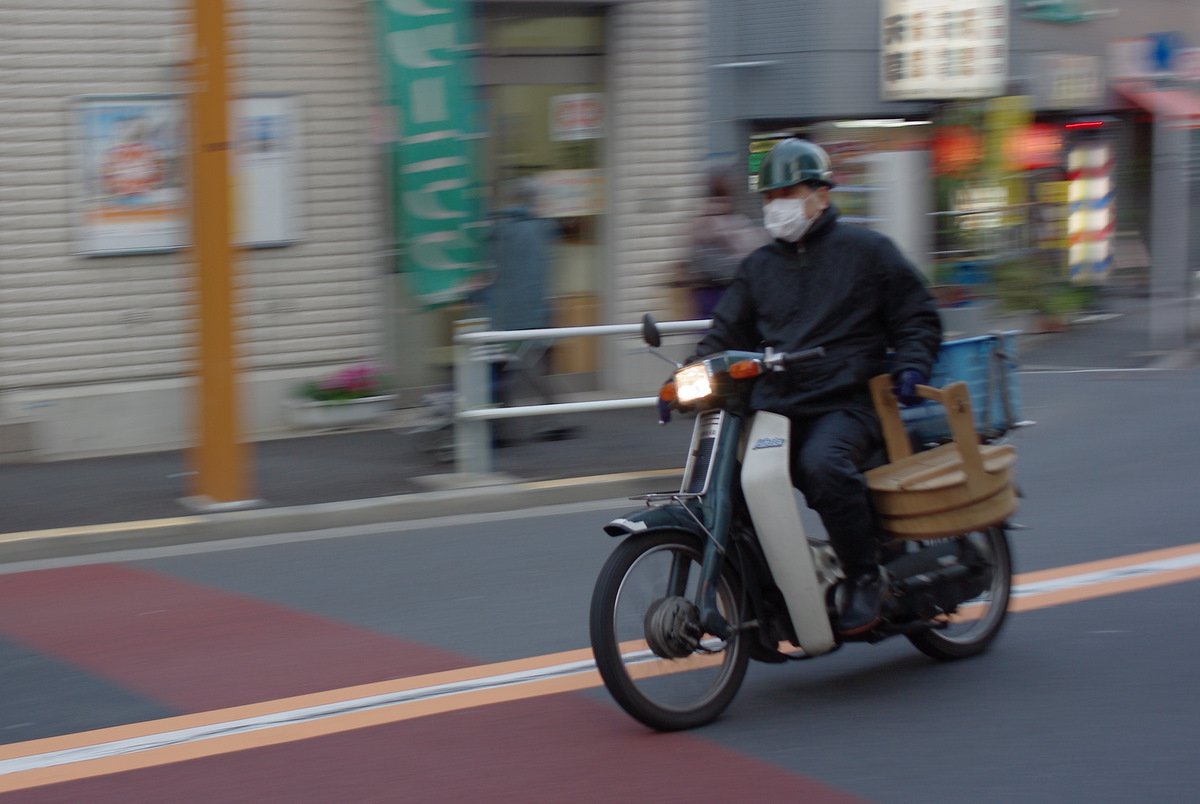
Delivery driver riding a Yamaha V step through one handed

In order of engine capacity and model:

1. Yamaha V50
2. Yamaha V50P
3. Yamaha V50M
4. Yamaha V70
5. Yamaha V75
6. Yamaha V80
7. Yamaha V80M
8. Yamaha V90

The Yamaha V series was advertised as an inexpensive and reliable moped/motorbike that was easy to use. The V series actually started in the early 1970s with the initial line up of the V50, V70 and V90. Then branched out to different variations in the mid-1970s with the V50p (to replace the V50) and V75 and then in the late 1970s added the V80. In early 1980, Yamaha discontinued the V70, V75, V90 and the original V80 models and introduced two new models, the V50M and the V80M. Thus reducing the number of models to two. The M in the name was to differentiate them from the earlier models

In 1985, the V range of step-through motorbikes were discontinued completely, being replaced by the Townmate series of Yamaha step-through motorbikes which carried on selling until some time in the early to mid 1990s in the UK.

== Differences between the V50s ==
Throughout the V series' lifetime there were three different variations of the V50. The reason for the different models was that Yamaha needed to change the moped to comply with changing laws on the 50 cc moped in the UK.

=== V50 ===
This was the first Yamaha V50 and was one of the first models to be sold along with the V70 and the V90. The original V50 had a 49 cc (3.0 cu in) two-stroke engine with a three speed semi-automatic gearbox and could reach speeds of about 35–40 mph (56–64 km/h). The problem with this model was that in the UK in the early 1970s to ride a 50 cc moped on a learner licence the bike needed to have pedals. So Yamaha decided to change the V50 model to the V50p, so it could be ridden on L-plates (in the UK).

=== V50P ===
The P in Yamaha V50P stood for pedals and was released in the UK in 1975, now that it had pedals it could be bought and used on L-plates. The bike itself was almost exactly the same to the original V50 but instead of having the standard footrests it had pedals that could move the bike when the engine was off. It still had the same engine with the 3-speed semi-automatic gearbox and still able to reach speeds of around 35–40 mph. In 1977, the law changed in the UK on what a moped was, so Yamaha released the next model of V50 in 1980.

=== V50M ===
The V50M was the last revision of the V50. It had a slight redesign with a different faring, a square headlight and a new speedometer with built in fuel gauge. The main difference was that this model had a two-speed automatic gearbox with high and low ratios and had a restricted top speed of 30 mph (48 km/h). The model changed because of the new law in the UK that defining a moped. Under the new law all new 50 cc mopeds were restricted to 30 mph.
