= Effective torque =

Measure of torque on geartrains

Effective torque (often referred to as wheel torque or torque to the wheels) is a concept primarily associated with automotive tuning. Torque can be measured using a dynamometer. Common units used in automotive applications can include foot-pounds and Newton·meters. Although commonly discussed in automotive contexts, the concept applies to any mechanical system involving torque transmission through intermediate components.

Effective torque represents the torque available at the output of a mechanical system after accounting for both transmission ratios and energy losses. In systems such as vehicle drivetrains, torque is increased through gear reduction, but reduced by inefficiencies due to friction and heat.

== Definition ==
The formula for effective torque to the wheels is:

$T_{\omega} = T_{e} \cdot N_{t} N_{f} \cdot \eta_{t} \eta_{f}$

where T_{ω} is wheel torque, T_{e} is engine torque, N_{t}, η_{t} are, respectively, the gearbox gear ratio and efficiency, and N_{f}, η_{f} are, respectively, the differential gear ratio and efficiency. Effective torque is often 5-15% lower than the shaft or crank ratings of an engine due to drivetrain losses.

== Cyclic Loading ==
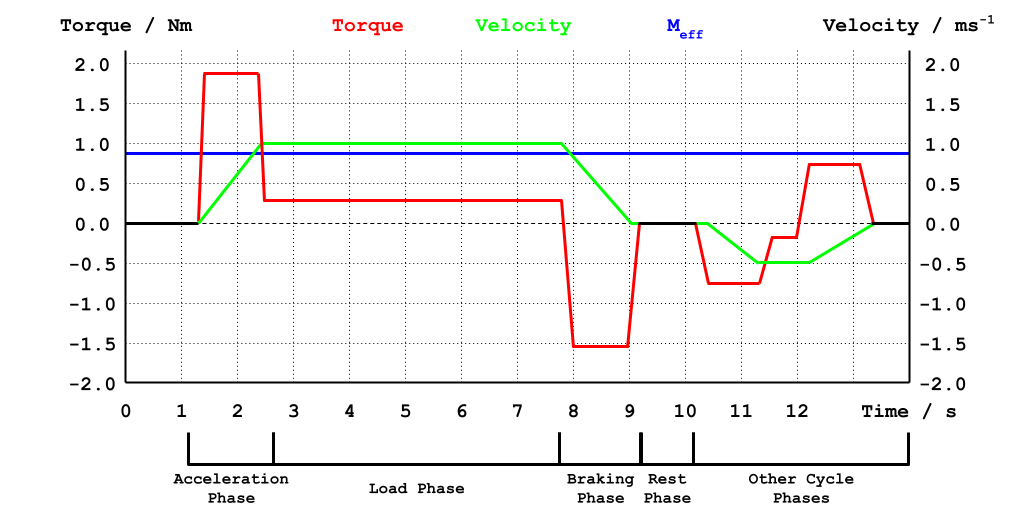
Illustration of torque variation over a duty cycle, showing how an equivalent (RMS) torque may be defined from time-varying loads

For a system that undergoes cycles (changes in load, speed, efficiency, etc...) a more general formula, not just used for automotive applications, for effective torque is

$M_{eff} = \sqrt{ \frac{ M_{A}^2 \cdot t_{A} + M_{L}^2 \cdot t_{L} + M_{Br}^2 \cdot t_{Br} + M_{St}^2 \cdot t_{St} + ... + M_{x}^2 \cdot t_{x} }{ t_{A} + t_{L} + t_{Br} + t_{St} + ... + t_{x} } }$

where M_{A}, t_{A} are the starting torque and start-up time respectively, M_{L}, t_{L} are the load torque and travel time respectively, M_{Br}, t_{Br} are the braking torque and braking time respectively, M_{St}, t_{St} are the rest torque and rest time respectively, and M_{x}, t_{x} represents any following cycle changes with this form.

A condensed root mean square (RMS) form for M_{eff} may be written as

$M_{eff} = \sqrt{ \frac{ \sum_{i=1}^{n} [M_{i}^2 \cdot t_{i}] }{ \sum_{i=1}^{n} [t_{i}] } }$

This formulation is commonly used in engineering to account for thermal and fatigue effects in components subjected to varying torque.

== See also ==
- Machine torque
- Torsion (mechanics)
