= Honda CRF450L =

Dual-sport motorcycle

Honda CRF450L/CRF450RL
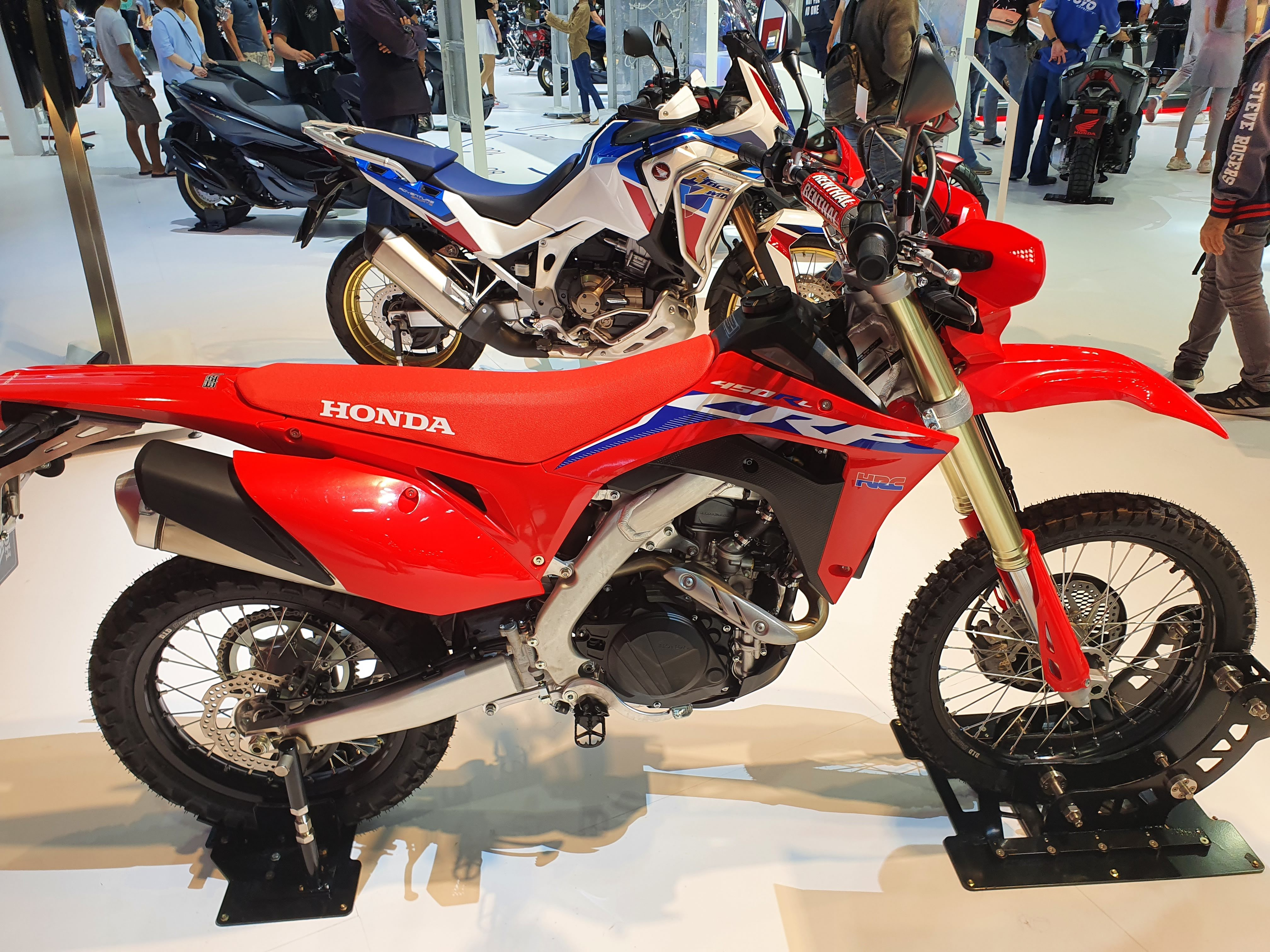
- Honda CRF450RL at the 2022 Bangkok Motor Show
- Manufacturer: Honda
- Also called: Honda CRF450RL (2020–present)
- Production: 2018–present
- Class: Dual-sport
- Engine: 449 cc (27.40 cu in) liquid-cooled 4-stroke 4-valve Unicam single
- Bore / stroke: 96 mm × 62.1 mm (3.8 in × 2.4 in)
- Compression ratio: 12.0:1
- Power: 17.6 kW (23.6 hp; 23.9 PS) @ 7,500 rpm (claimed); 28.49 kW (38.21 hp; 38.74 PS) @ 7,360 rpm (rear wheel)
- Torque: 32 N⋅m (24 lbf⋅ft) @ 3,500 rpm (claimed); 37.96 N⋅m (28.00 lbf⋅ft) @ 6,510 rpm (rear wheel)
- Transmission: 6-speed, constant mesh, manual
- Frame type: Aluminium twin-spar
- Suspension: Front: Inverted leading-axle 49 mm (1.9 in) coil-spring telescopic fork Rear: Monoshock with Pro-Link
- Brakes: Front: Dual-piston caliper with single 260 mm (10.2 in) disc Rear: Single-piston caliper with single 240 mm (9.4 in) disc
- Tires: Front: 80/100-21 (tube type); Rear: 120/80-18 (tube type)
- Wheelbase: 1,496 mm (58.9 in)
- Seat height: 942 mm (37.1 in)
- Weight: 131 kg (289 lb) (wet)
- Fuel capacity: 7.6 L; 1.7 imp gal (2.01 US gal)

The Honda CRF450L (known as CRF450RL since 2020) is a CRF series 450 cc (27 cu in) dual-sport motorcycle made by Honda. It was announced in May 2018 and available from September of the same year. It is the fifth member of CRF dual-sport lineup (-L suffix) offered by Honda, after CRF230L, CRF250L, CRF1000L Africa Twin and CRF150L. Unlike other bikes from this lineup, the frame and engine of the CRF450L are directly taken from CRF450R motocross and CRF450X enduro bikes, while the other bikes such as CRF150L and CRF250L do not share anything from its motocross and enduro counterparts.

The CRF450L Rally concept bike inspired from the CRF450 Rally Dakar racer was showcased at the November 2018 EICMA.
