= Astra Honda Motor =

Indonesian motorcycle manufacturer

PT Astra Honda Motor

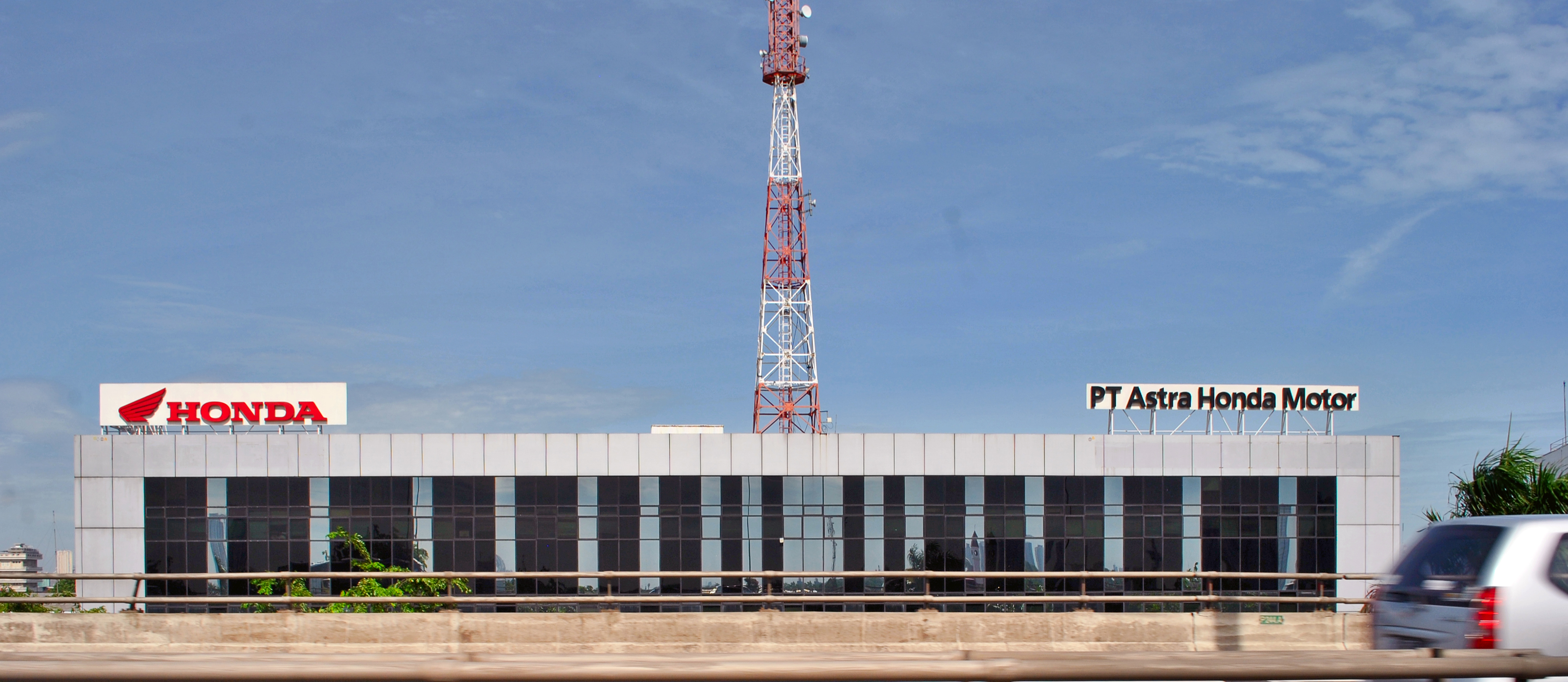
- Astra Honda Motor headquarters in Jakarta
- Trade name: AHM
- Type: Joint venture
- Industry: Automotive
- Founded: 11 June 1971
- Headquarters: Jakarta
- Area served: Indonesia
- Products: Motorcycles
- Owners: Honda Motor Co., Ltd. (50%); Astra International (50%)
- Website: https://www.astra-honda.com/

PT Astra Honda Motor (AHM) is a motorcycle manufacturer based in Jakarta, Indonesia. It is a joint venture between Honda and Astra International (with a 50% stake each).

== History ==
Astra Honda Motor was formed in 1971 as PT. Federal Motor with the assembly of Honda motorcycles. At the same time, it took over as the sole agency.

In 2000, the Astra Honda Motor joint venture was agreed between Honda and Astra International, which began operations in January 2001. According to another source, the new company was a merger between PT. Federal Motor and PT. Honda Federal.

Ten million Honda motorcycles were manufactured in Indonesia by 2003.

In 2004 and 2005, Honda built a third plant in Bekasi. In March 2015, the company opened a fourth plant in Karawang. With a production capacity of 5.3 million motorcycles, Astra Honda Motor is the world's largest manufacturer of Honda motorcycles.

At the beginning of 2015, around 22,400 people were employed at AHM.

Honda has a very large market share in Indonesia, for example 73% in the first half of 2016. The Indonesian market for motorcycles is one of the largest in Southeast Asia with more than 7 million units.

== Current models ==
Excluding ≥250 cc motorcycles/scooters

Standard motorcycles

- Honda CB150 Verza
- Honda CB150R Streetfire
- Honda CB150X
- Honda Monkey (imported)

Sport motorcycles

- Honda CBR150R
- Honda CBR250RR

Dual-sport motorcycles

- Honda CRF150L
- Honda CRF250L (imported)
- Honda CRF250 Rally (imported)

Underbones

- Honda Revo
- Honda Sonic 150R
- Honda Supra GTR 150
- Honda Supra X 125
- Honda CT125 (imported)
- Honda Super Cub C125 (imported)
- Honda ST125 Dax (imported)

Scooters

- Honda ADV
- Honda BeAT
- Honda CUV e:
- Honda EM1 e:
- Honda Genio
- Honda ICON e:
- Honda Stylo
- Honda PCX
- Honda Scoopy
- Honda Vario
- Honda Forza (imported)
