= Vario =

Vario may refer to:

== People ==
- Paul Vario (1914–1988), high-ranking member of the Lucchese crime family
- João Vário (1937–2007), Cape Verdean writer, neurosurgeon, scientist, and professor
- Akhtar Ali Vario (died 2008), politician

== Technology ==
- MDA Vario, a version of the HTC Wizard smartphone
- Vario (Pokémon), a Pokémon Colosseum character
- Variometer, an aircraft flight instrument sometimes shortened to "vario"

== Other uses ==
- Mercedes-Benz Vario, a heavy van
- Honda Click scooter, sold in Indonesia, Malaysia, and Vietnam as Honda Vario
- Vario (Savant album), an album by Savant
