= Honda CRF230L =

- Manufacturer: Honda
- Production: 2008–2009
- Assembly: Japan
- Predecessor: Honda XL185
- Successor: Honda CRF250L
- Class: Dual-sport
- Engine: 223 cc (13.6 cu in) air-cooled 2V SOHC single
- Bore / stroke: 65 mm × 66 mm (2.6 in × 2.6 in)
- Compression ratio: 9.0:1
- Ignition type: CDI (Capacitive Discharge)
- Transmission: Wet multiplate clutch, 6-speed, chain
- Frame type: Steel Semi-double cradle
- Suspension: Showa; Front: telescopic fork, 8" travel Rear: monoshock 6" travel
- Brakes: Nissin hydraulic discs Front: 240 mm 2 piston Rear: 220 mm
- Tires: Bridgestone. Front: 2.75-21M/C 45P; Rear: 120/80-18M/C 62
- Rake, trail: 26°, 103 mm (4.1 in)
- Wheelbase: 1,340 mm (53 in)
- Dimensions: L: 2,072 mm (81.6 in); W: 848 mm (33.4 in); H: 1,113 mm (43.8 in)
- Seat height: 32 in (810 mm)
- Weight: 113.5 kg (250 lb) (dry); 121.5 kg (268 lb) (wet)
- Fuel capacity: 2.3 US gal (8.7 L; 1.9 imp gal)
- Fuel consumption: 100 mpg_{‑US} (43 km/L) at 35 mph

The Honda CRF230L is a dual-sport motorcycle made by Honda from 2008 to 2009. It was designed to be a small, lightweight, affordable dual sport for beginner riders, commuters, or adventure riders. It was sold in the U.S. and Canada.

== History ==
The CRF230L was created as the successor to the XL185S. It was Honda's first new dual sport in 16 years since the introduction of the XR650L in 1992. It was marketed as a road legal version of the CRF230F, hence the name "CRF" instead of XR or XL as with earlier Honda dual sports, despite having a different frame and engine from Honda's other CRF formats.
