= Honda CRF series =

Motorcycle

Honda CRF
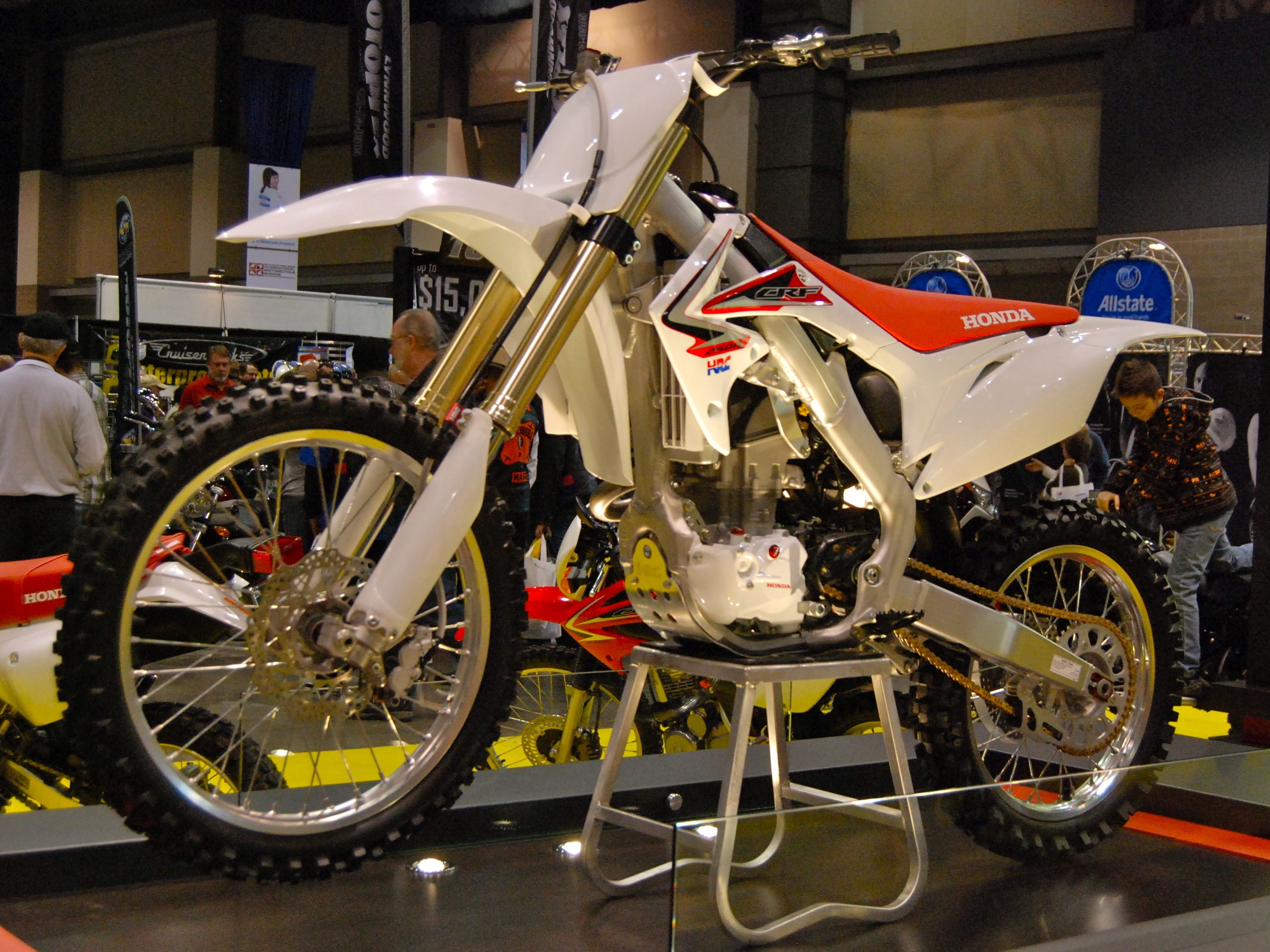
- 2010 Honda CRF250R at the 2009 Seattle International Motorcycle Show
- Manufacturer: Honda
- Production: 2000–present
- Predecessor: Honda CR series
- Class: Motocross, dual-sport

The Honda CRF series is a line of four-stroke motocross, trail, and dual sport motorcycles manufactured and marketed by Honda.

The CRF line was launched in 2000 as a successor to the Honda CR series. The full sized motocross bikes are equipped with liquid-cooled, single cylinder four-stroke engines that are available from 149 cc (9.1 cu in) to 449 cc (27.4 cu in). They now have dual-sport motorcycles. The more trail friendly CRFs, with the F suffix, have simple air-cooled engines, and are available from 50 cc (3.1 cu in) to 300 cc (18 cu in). The Honda CRF450R was the first in the series, followed by the CRF250R in 2004. Further down the line, the CRF450X and CRF250X bikes emerged, both designed for mostly off-road use. They are considered among the best motocross bikes of their class, and have been a leading seller since their introduction. The CRF450R was CycleWorld's Best Motocrosser for a record eight consecutive years from 2002 to 2009.

== Engine technology ==
The engines in these bikes use an over-square design, which means that the diameter of the cylinder is larger than the stroke of the piston. This allows for higher engine speeds and a reduction of reciprocating mass for a given displacement. Another technology that is used is short piston skirts. The "skirt" area of the piston is the portion on the side of the piston which comes into contact with the cylinder wall and aids piston stability. While the introduction of the shorter skirt on the piston helps to reduce reciprocating mass, it also leads to more "rocking" of the piston, or minute unwanted rotation of the piston around the axis of its wrist pin. This leads to more frequent maintenance intervals for the pistons, piston rings, and cylinder walls.

== Model overview ==
=== CRF-F ===
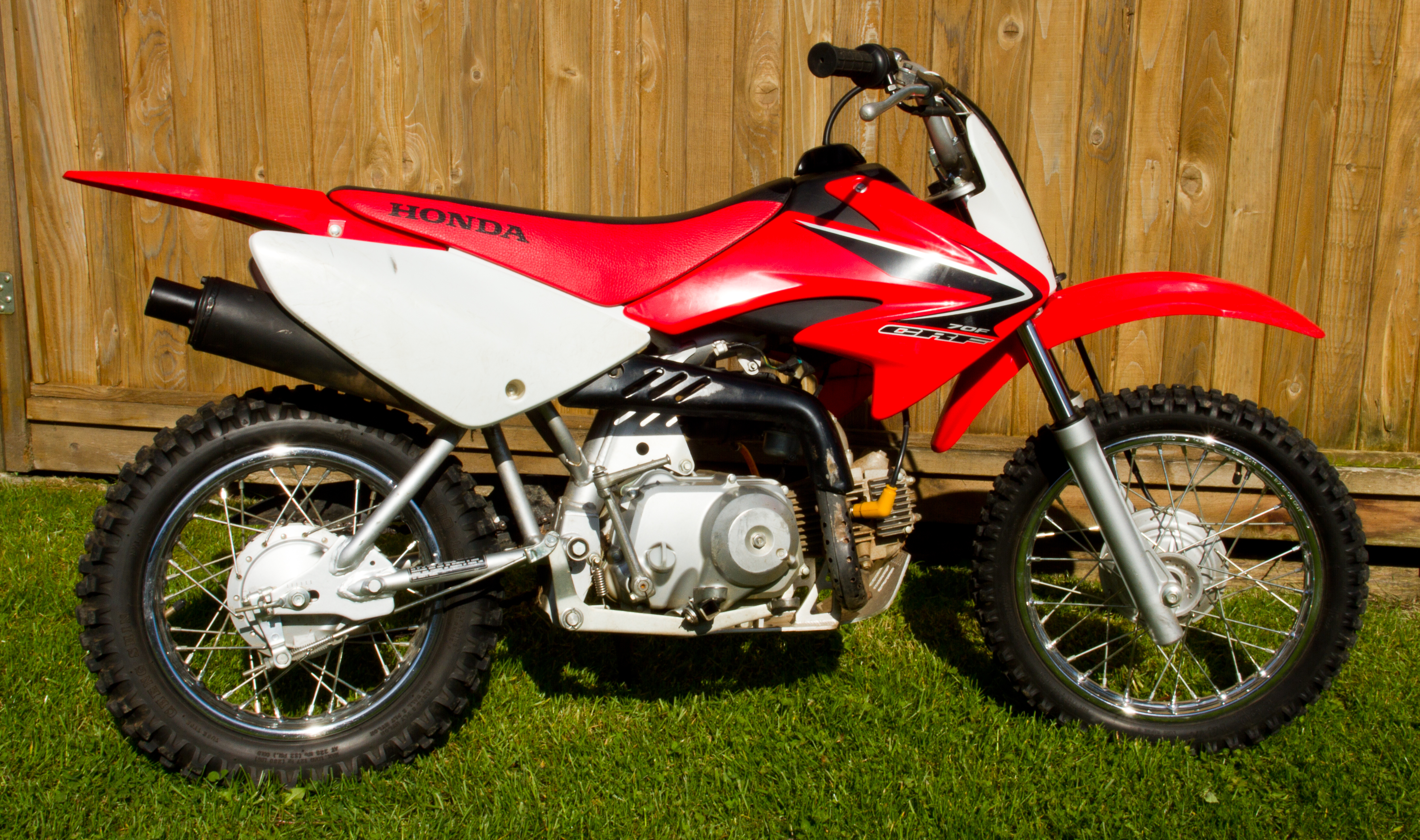
Honda CRF70F

As of 2026, the CRF-F series includes the CRF50F, CRF110F, CRF125F, CRF125FB (Big wheel), CRF250, CRF300F.

For the 2019 model year the CRF 110F, CRF125F, and CRF250F all come standard with electronic fuel injection.

These motorcycles use air-cooled 4-stroke engines.

In all, Honda has made a CRF50F, CRF70F, CRF80F, CRF100F, CRF110F, CRF125F, CRF125FB, CRF150F, CRF230F, CRF250F, and CRF300F.

The CRF70F, CRF80F, CRF100F, CRF150F and the CRF230F have been discontinued. The 70 was replaced by the 110, the 80 and 100 were replaced by the 125, the 150F does not have a replacement, and the 230 was replaced by the 250F. In 2026 the CRF 250F was replaced by the CRF 300F.

=== CRF-R ===
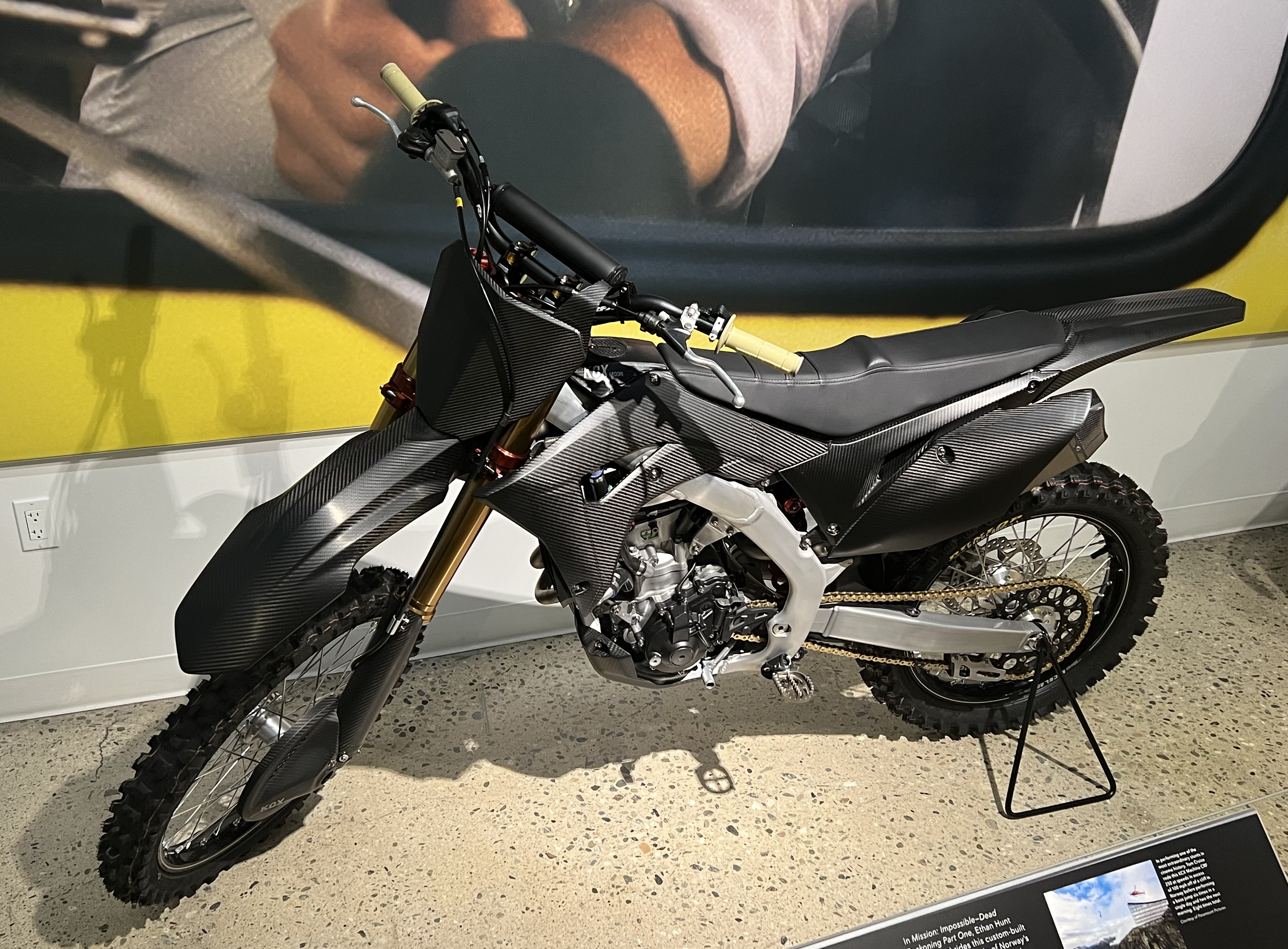
2020 Honda CRF250R

As of 2026, the CRF-R series includes the CRF150R, CRF250R, and CRF450R.

These liquid-cooled four-stroke machines were designed to be utilized purely for closed-course motocross racing. The CRF-R lineup lacks any extra accessories such as lights, however the CRF450R had an option for an electric starter in 2017, and the CRF250R and CRF450R have come standard with electric start since 2018.

=== CRF-RX ===
As of 2026, the CRF-RX series includes the CRF250RX and CRF450RX.

This machine is built as a CRF-450R optimized for hare scramble, hard enduro, and GNCC style racing. Essentially the same as the CRF-450R except offering an electric start, larger fuel tank, and an 18-inch rear wheel as standard equipment. This bike is to bridge the gap between the more mild X-model and the closed-course race style R model. (First model year: 2017)

=== CRF-X ===
As of 2026, the CRF-X series includes the CRF250X and the CRF450X.

These bikes have electric start, but are still considered race bikes, albeit for off-road rather than motocross. Differences from the R models include lighting, electric start, suspension settings, engine and exhaust tuning for more low-end torque, larger fuel tanks, and a 6-speed widespread ratio transmission. Robby Bell won the San Felipe 250 in 2006, 2007 and 2008.

=== CRF-L ===
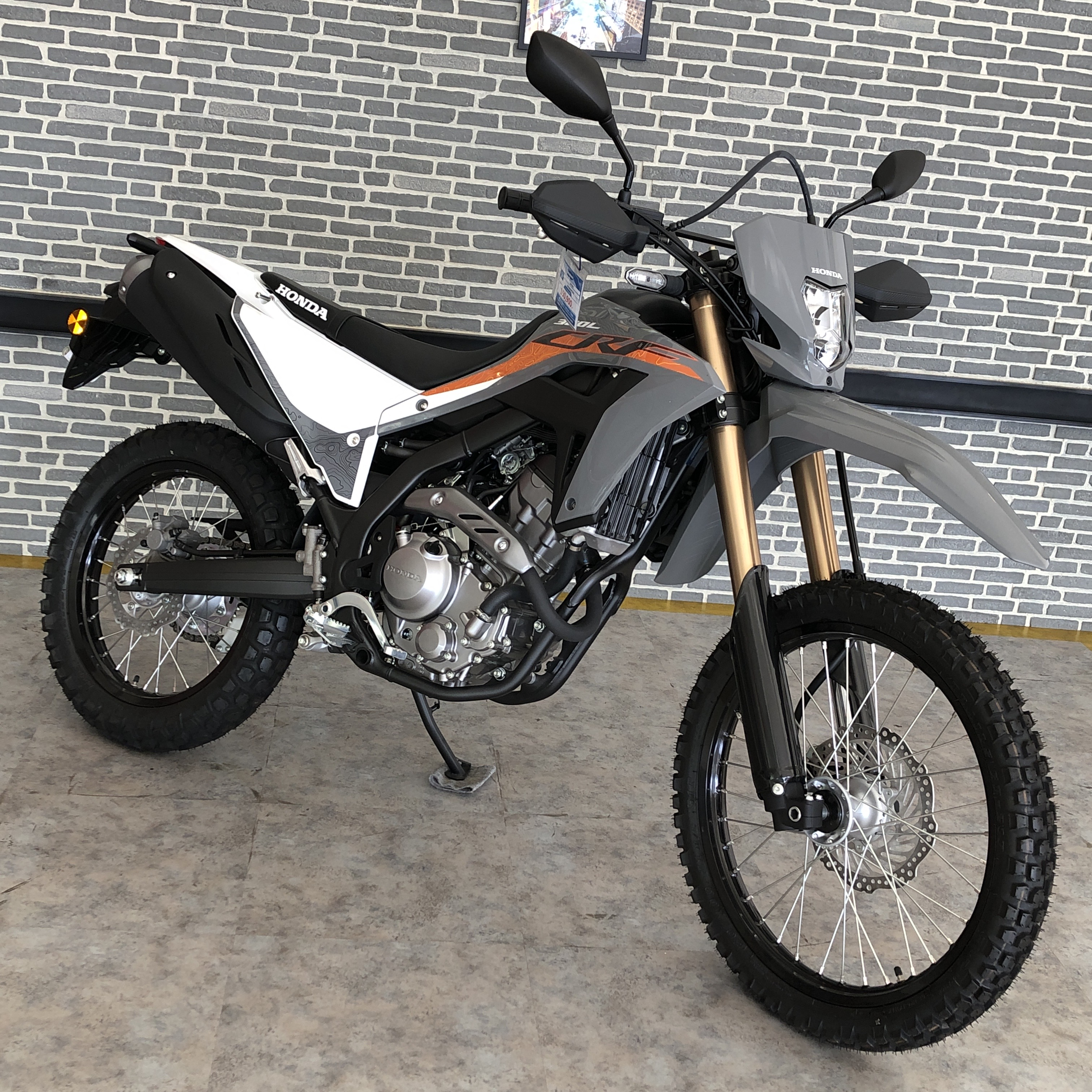
Honda CRF300L

As of 2026, the CRF-L series includes the CRF150L, CRF190L, CRF250L/CRF300L, CRF450RL and the CRF1100L Africa Twin.

==== CRF230L ====
In 2008, the CRF230L was introduced as an entry-level dual sport and was street legal from the factory, but still retained a dirt-oriented design. All have full lighting and electric starters. They have a different frame and engine from Honda's other CRF formats, and most other components are not shared with the other CRF(non-street-legal) motorcycles. These different components meet emissions and government road regulations. Outside of the United States, the CRF230L was marketed as the XR230L. It was discontinued in 2009.

==== CRF250L/CRF300L ====
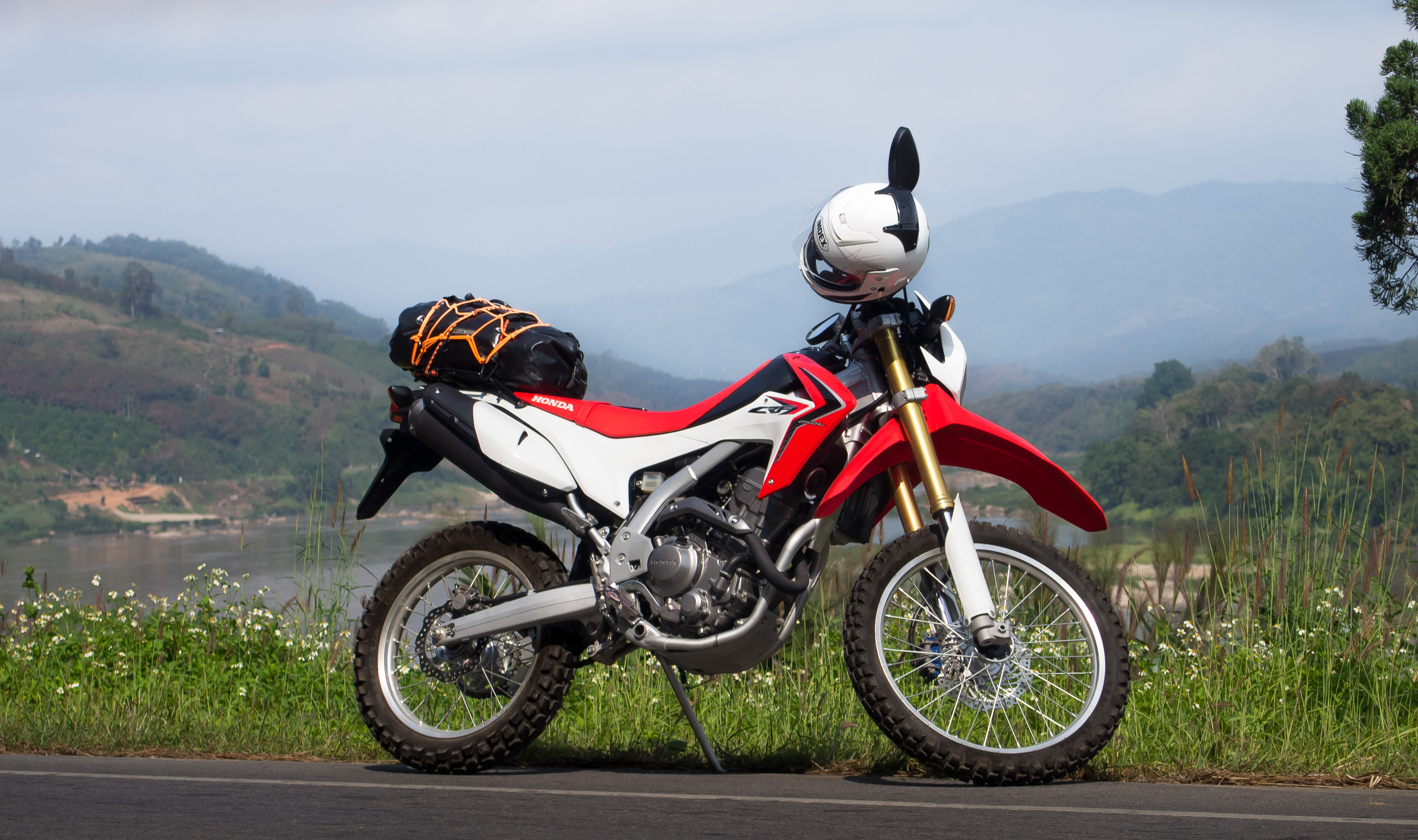
The Honda CRF250L in Thailand, with the Mekong river and Laos in the background

In April 2012, the completely redesigned dual-purpose CRF250L was launched in Japan. It shares a liquid-cooled 249 cc 4-stroke DOHC single-cylinder EFI engine with the CBR250R. It is manufactured in Thailand. 2012 - 2016 model designation MD38. 2017-2020 model designation MD44. 2021-2023 model designation MD47.

The stroked-up CRF300L was introduced in November 2020.

==== CRF150L ====
In November 2017, the 150 cc model called CRF150L was launched in Indonesia. It shares an air-cooled 149 cc 4-stroke SOHC single-cylinder EFI engine with the Verza. It is manufactured by Astra Honda Motor.

=== CRF-M ===
In 2008, the CRF230M was the first to offer a supermoto version of the original dual sport, which had several mechanical and cosmetic differences including:

- Black body panels, frame, and wheels
- 17 inch front and rear wheels
- Aluminum handlebar

In April 2013, exactly one year after the initial launch of the CRF250L, Honda announced plans to sell a supermoto version of their dual-purpose motorcycle in Europe. The CRF250M is based on the popular dual-purpose CRF250L, with revised suspension, uprated front brake and 17-inch wheels with wider road tyres. The CRF250M adds another A2 licence-friendly machine to Honda's line-up.

=== CRF Rally ===
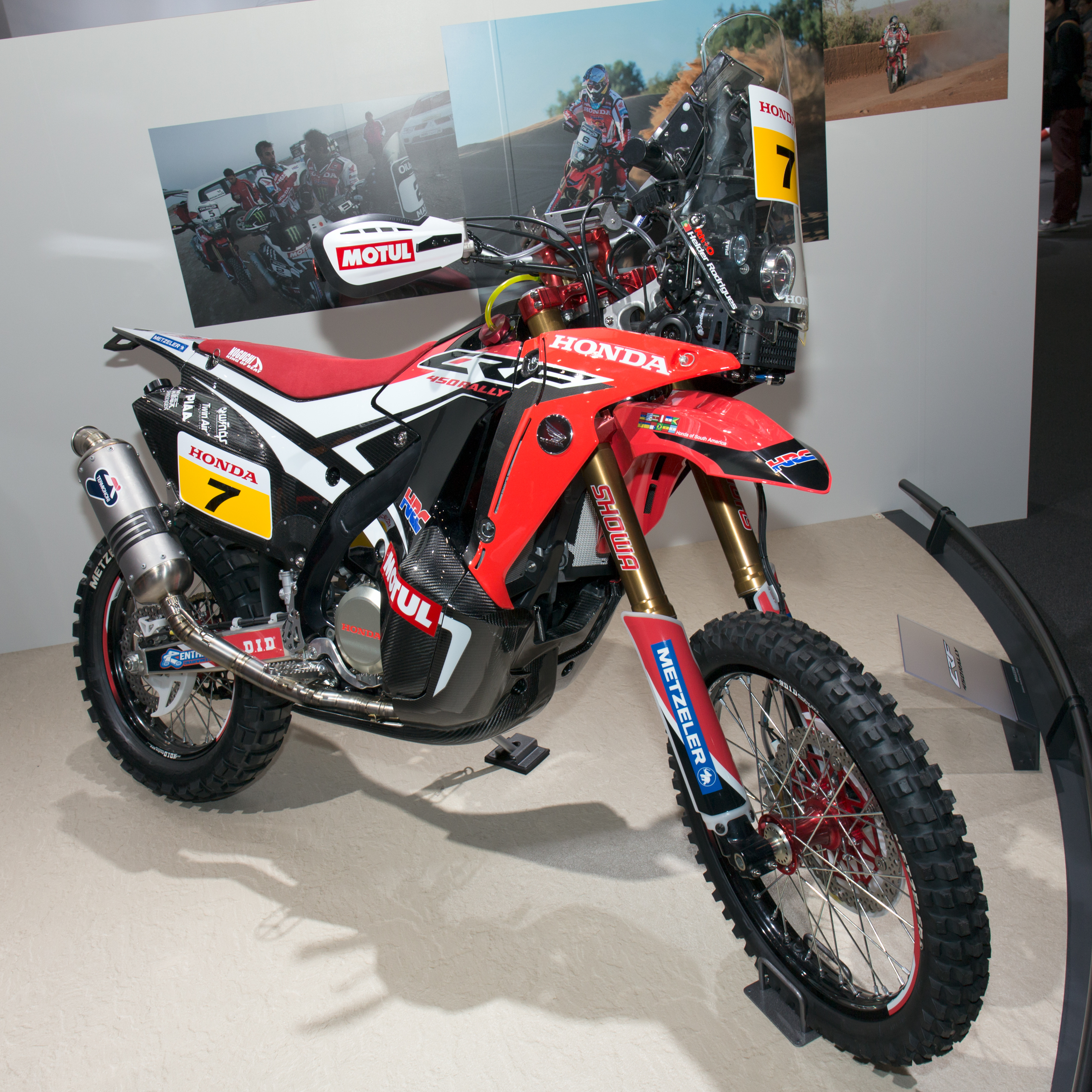
Honda CRF450 Rally

The CRF 250 Rally and 300 Rally are the more road oriented versions of the CRF 250L and 300L. The top differentiators are the larger fuel tanks, more fairing and different headlights. The tank of the 300 Rally is 5 litres larger (12.8l vs 7.8l) and its fairing bears an LED headlight and a sizeable windshield, versus a classic halogen bulb and no windshield on the 300L.

== See also ==
- List of Honda motorcycles
- Honda XR series
