= Honda CRF450R =

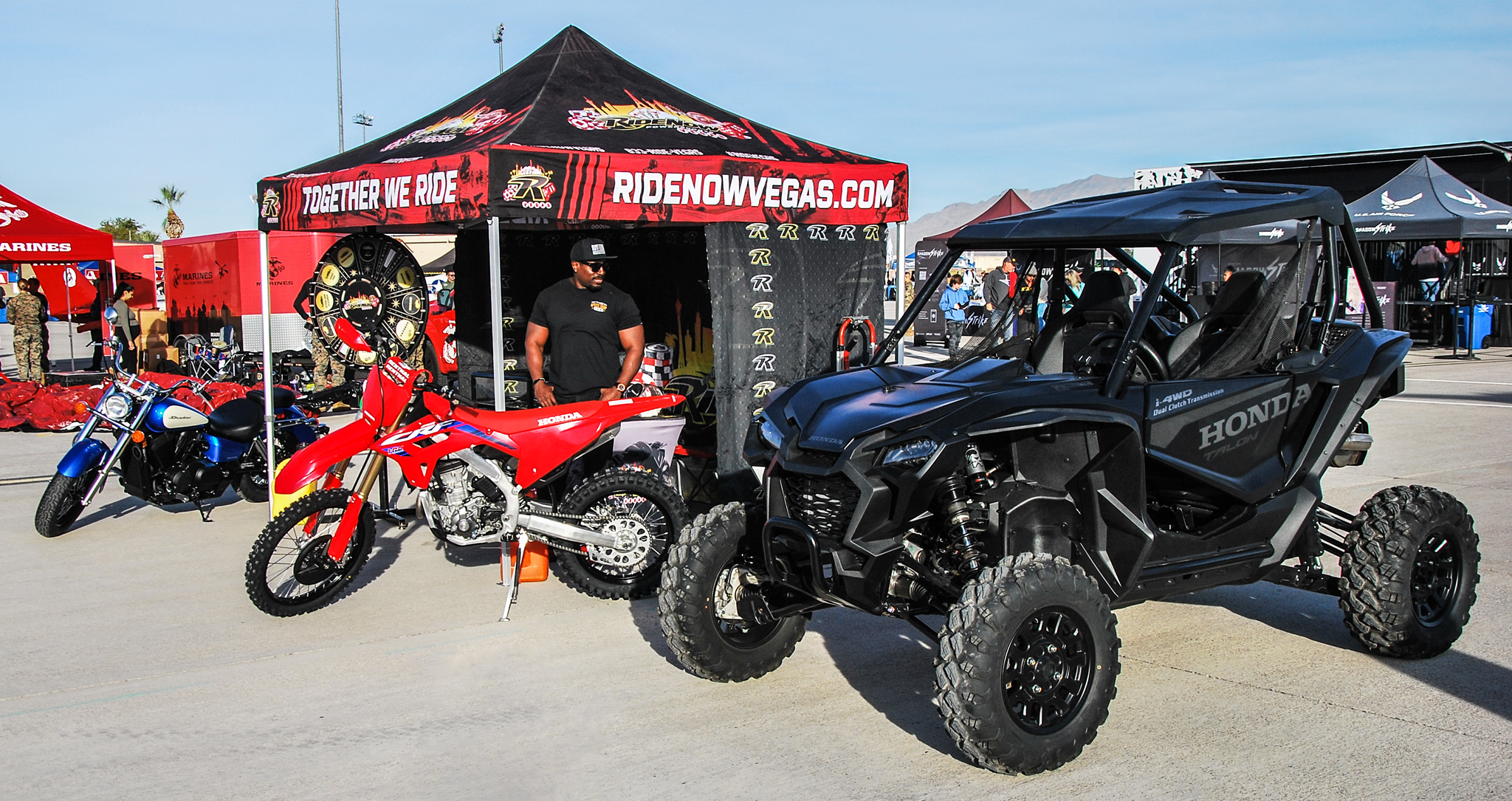
- Manufacturer: Honda Motor Company
- Class: Motocross
- Engine: SOHC, multivalve, water-cooled, four-stroke, single

The Honda CRF450R is a four-stroke racing motocross motorcycle built by Honda Motor Company. It is the successor to the Honda CR250R two-stroke.

The Honda CRF450X is the enduro version of the Honda CRF450R.

== Notable changes ==
2004	7/8" Handlebars
2008	Honda Progressive Steering Damper
2009	Fuel injection
2013	Air forks, dual exhaust
2017	Spring forks, no more Progressive Steering Damper
2018	Electric starter
2021	Single exhaust

== First generation: 2002–2004 ==
First Generation CRF450R
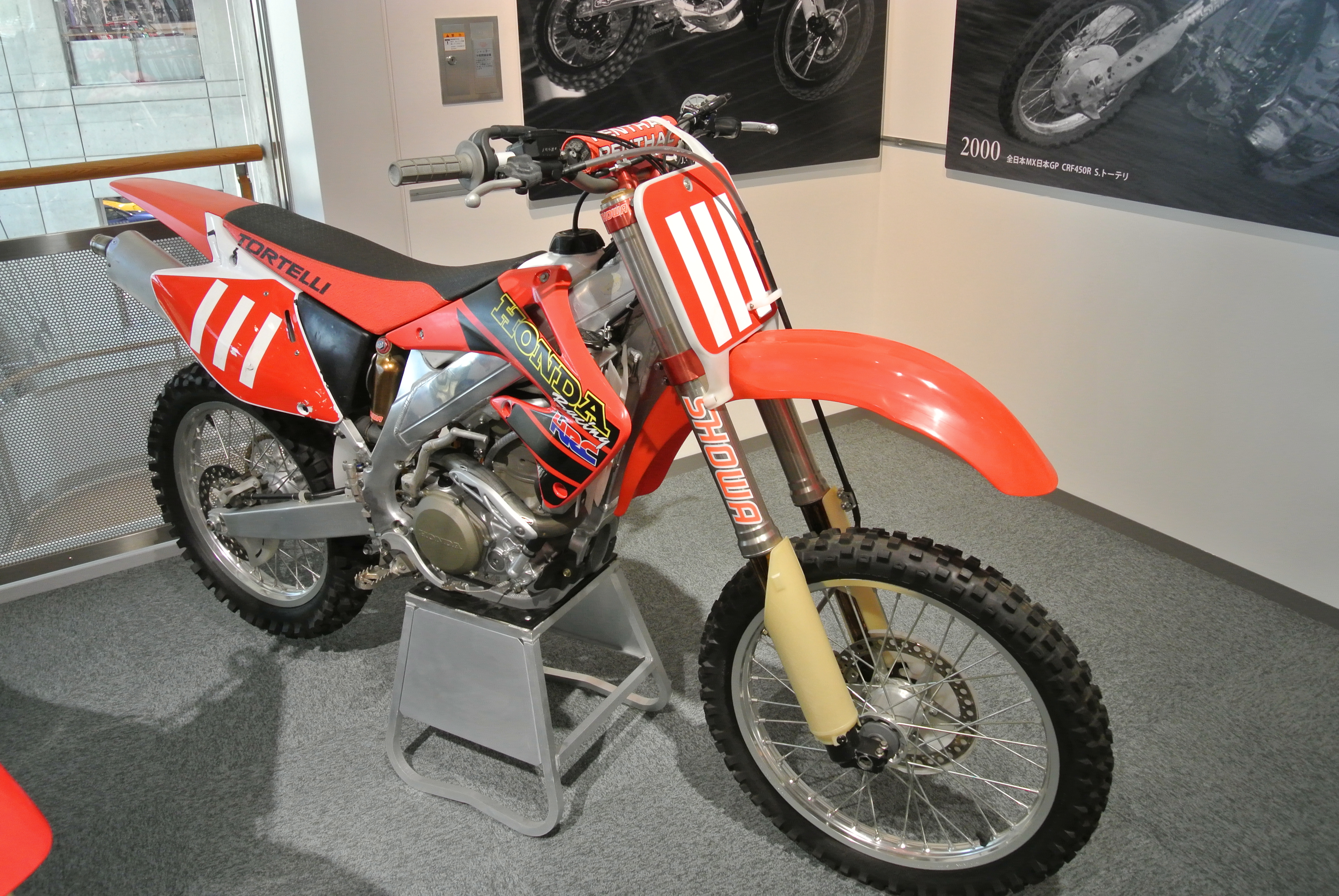
- Production: 2002–2004
- Predecessor: Honda CR series
- Successor: Second Generation CRF450R
- Engine: 449 cc (27.4 cu in) liquid-cooled, SOHC four-stroke, single
- Bore / stroke: 96 mm × 62.1 mm (3.78 in × 2.44 in)
- Compression ratio: 11.5:1
- Transmission: 5-speed manual
- Suspension: Front: 305mm travel Rear: 315mm travel
- Brakes: Single disc, 240 mm (9.4 in)
- Wheelbase: 59.4 in (1,510 mm)
- Seat height: 28.6 in (730 mm)
- Weight: 224.9 lb (102.0 kg) (dry)
- Fuel capacity: 2.4 gals

The CRF450R was introduced in 2002. Unlike the competing Yamaha YZ426, the first generation CRF450R has an aluminum frame. In 2003, Honda added a longer shock and new linkage to raise the rear end and steepen the head angle. In 2003, camshaft, exhaust, and ignition map were revised. The handlebar size was changed to 7/8 in (22 mm) in 2004.

== Second generation: 2005–2008 ==
Second Generation CRF450R
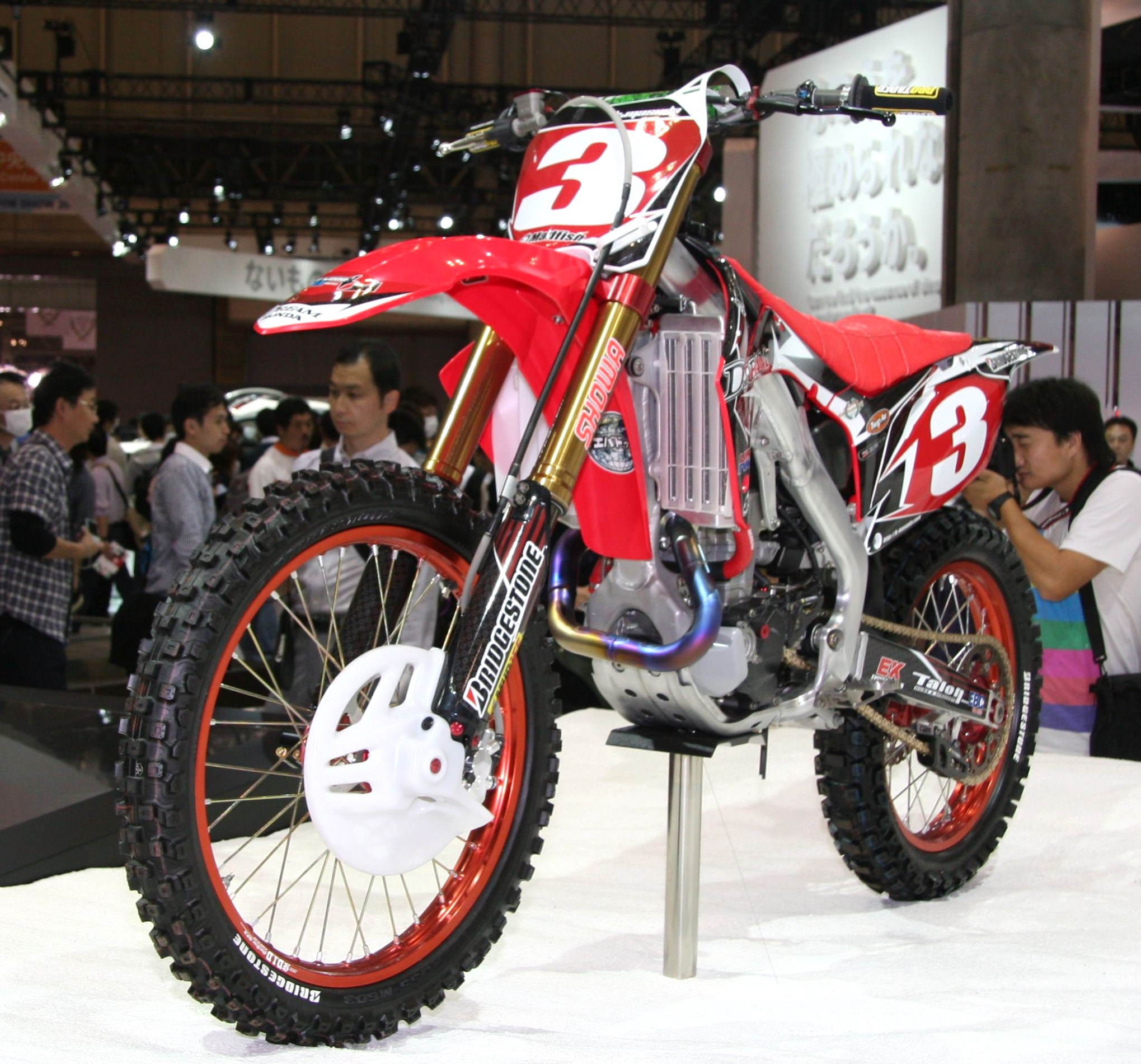
- Production: 2005–2008
- Predecessor: First Generation CRF450R
- Successor: Third Generation CRF450R
- Engine: 449 cc (27.4 cu in) liquid-cooled, SOHC, four-stroke, single
- Bore / stroke: 96 mm × 62.1 mm (3.78 in × 2.44 in)
- Compression ratio: 12.0:1
- Transmission: Close-ratio five-speed manual
- Suspension: Front: 47mm inverted Showa cartridge fork with rebound and compression damping adjustability; 12.4 inches travel Rear: Pro-Link Showa single shock with spring preload, rebound damping adjustability, and high/low-speed compression damping adjustability; 12.5 inches travel
- Brakes: Front: Single 240 mm (9.4 in) disc with twin-piston caliper Rear: Single 240mm disc
- Tires: Front: 80/100-21 Rear: 110/90-19
- Rake, trail: 26.79°, 109.4mm
- Wheelbase: 58.7 in (1,490 mm)
- Seat height: 37.6 in (960 mm)
- Weight: 218.5 lb (99.1 kg) (claimed) (dry)
- Fuel capacity: 1.9 gals

The second generation CRF450R had a redesigned motor and frame with new bodywork styling from the new CRF250R. In 2008, the Honda Progressive Steering Damper (HPSD) was introduced, allowing the steering geometry to be more aggressive.

== Third generation: 2009–2012 ==
Third Generation CRF450R
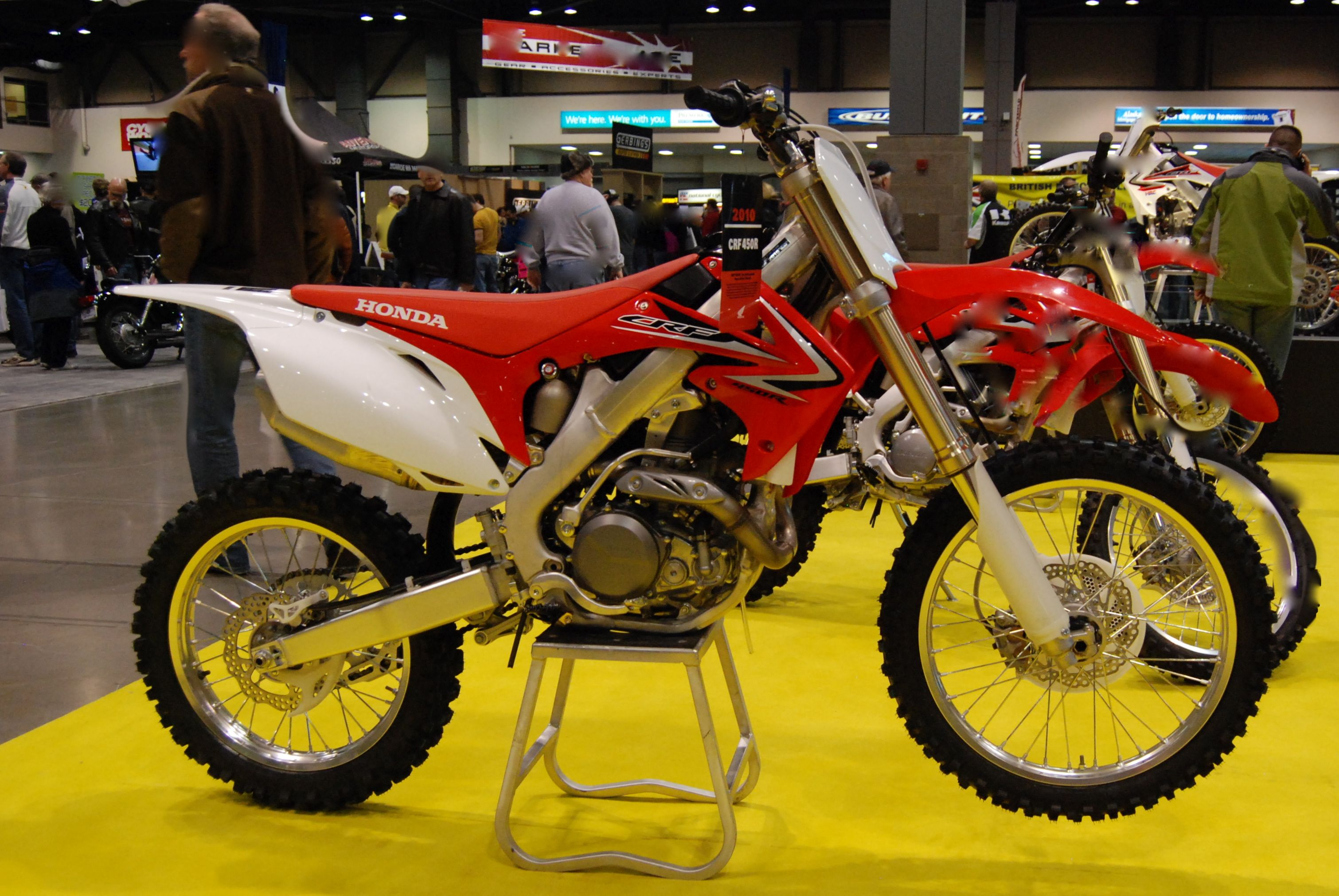
- Production: 2009–2012
- Predecessor: Second Generation CRF450R
- Successor: Fourth Generation CRF450R
- Engine: 449 cc (27.4 cu in), liquid-cooled, SOHC, four-stroke, single
- Bore / stroke: 96 mm × 62.1 mm (3.78 in × 2.44 in)
- Transmission: Close-ratio five-speed manual
- Suspension: Front: 48mm inverted KYB Air-Oil-Separate (AOS) with rebound and compression damping adjustability; 12.2 inches travel Rear: Pro-Link KYB single shock with spring preload, rebound damping adjustability, and high/low-speed compression damping adjustment; 12.6 inches travel
- Brakes: Front: Single 240 mm (9.4 in) disc with twin-piston caliper Rear: Single 240mm disc
- Tires: Front: 80/100-21 Rear: 120/80-19
- Rake, trail: 26° 52', 114.2mm
- Wheelbase: 58.7 in
- Seat height: 37.6 in (960 mm)
- Weight: 234.8 lb (106.5 kg) (claimed) (wet)
- Fuel capacity: 1.5 gal

The third generation CRF450R had fuel-injection and an all-new bike to match.

== Fourth generation: 2013–2016 ==
Fourth Generation CRF450R
- Production: 2013–2016
- Predecessor: Third Generation CRF450R
- Engine: 449 cc (27.4 cu in) liquid-cooled, SOHC four-stroke, single
- Bore / stroke: 96 mm × 62.1 mm (3.78 in × 2.44 in)
- Compression ratio: 12.5:1
- Transmission: Close-ratio five-speed manual
- Suspension: Front: 48mm inverted KYB PSF® (Pneumatic Spring Fork) with rebound and compression-damping adjustability. 12.2 inches travel. Rear: Pro-Link® KYB single shock with adjustable spring preload, rebound damping adjustability, and high/low-speed compression damping adjustment. 12.4 inches travel
- Brakes: Front: Single 240 mm (9.4 in) disc with twin-piston caliper Rear: Single 240mm disc
- Tires: Front: Dunlop MX51FA 80/100-21 Rear: Dunlop MX51 120/80-19
- Rake, trail: 27° 04', 116mm
- Wheelbase: 58.7 in (1,490 mm)
- Seat height: 37.5 in (950 mm)
- Weight: 242.7 lb (110.1 kg) (claimed) (wet)
- Fuel capacity: 1.66 gal

The fourth generation of the CRF450R introduced a new twin-exhaust to centralize mass. Also new to the fourth generation were air forks.

== Fifth generation: 2017–2020 ==
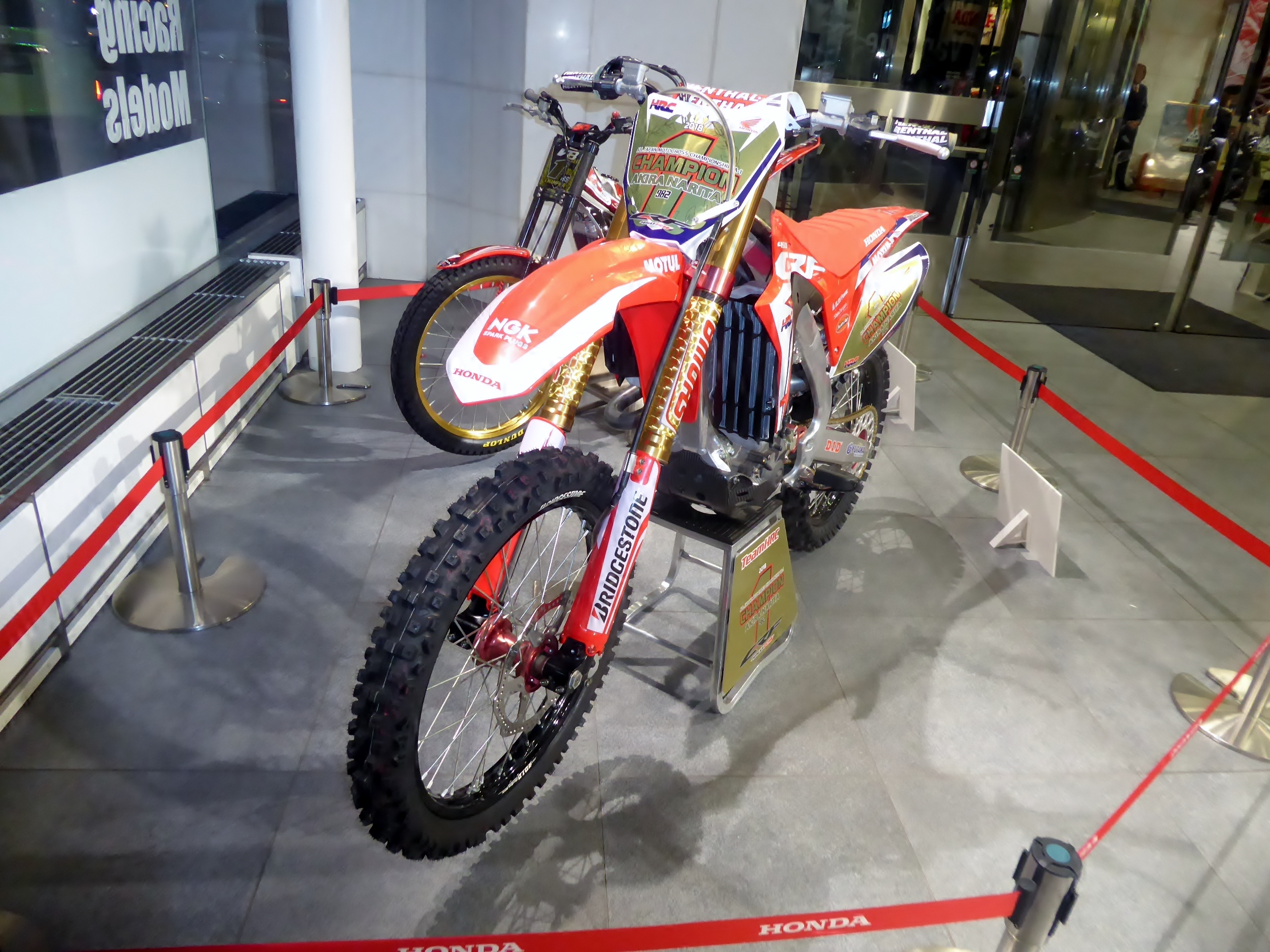
2018 Honda CRF450R

The 2017 CRF450R offers a new engine design and optional electric start. The air forks were switched out in favor of Showa coil spring forks.

The 2018 offers standard electric start and new engine mount offer most chassis flex.

The 2019 CRF450R features an all-new swing-arm and a launch control setting.

== Sixth generation: 2021–present ==
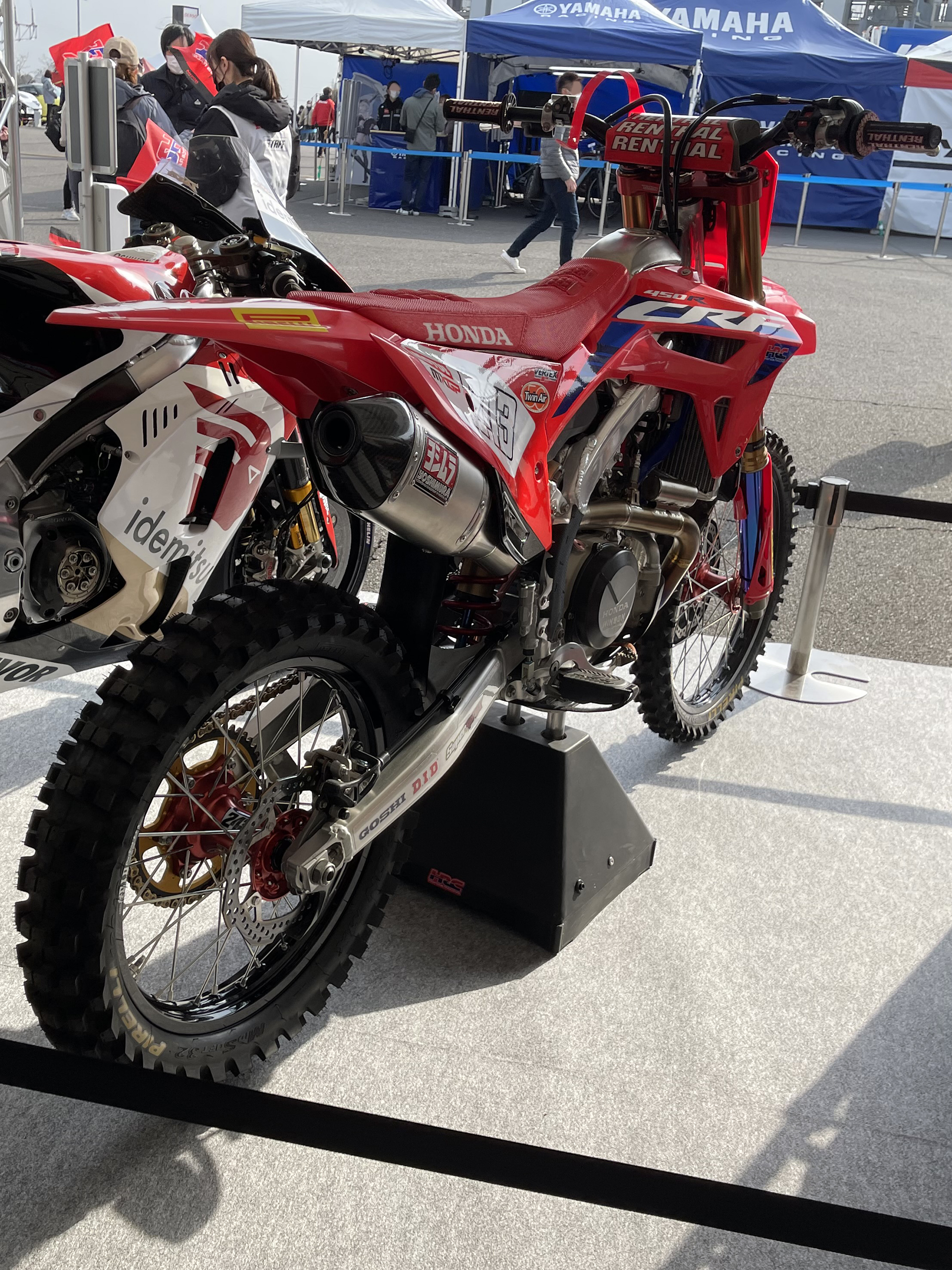
2022 Honda CRF450R

New slimmer frame and plastic design, single exhaust ported through center of the upright. The exhaust port is now oval instead of round.

== See also ==
- Honda CRF series
