= Honda CRF450X =

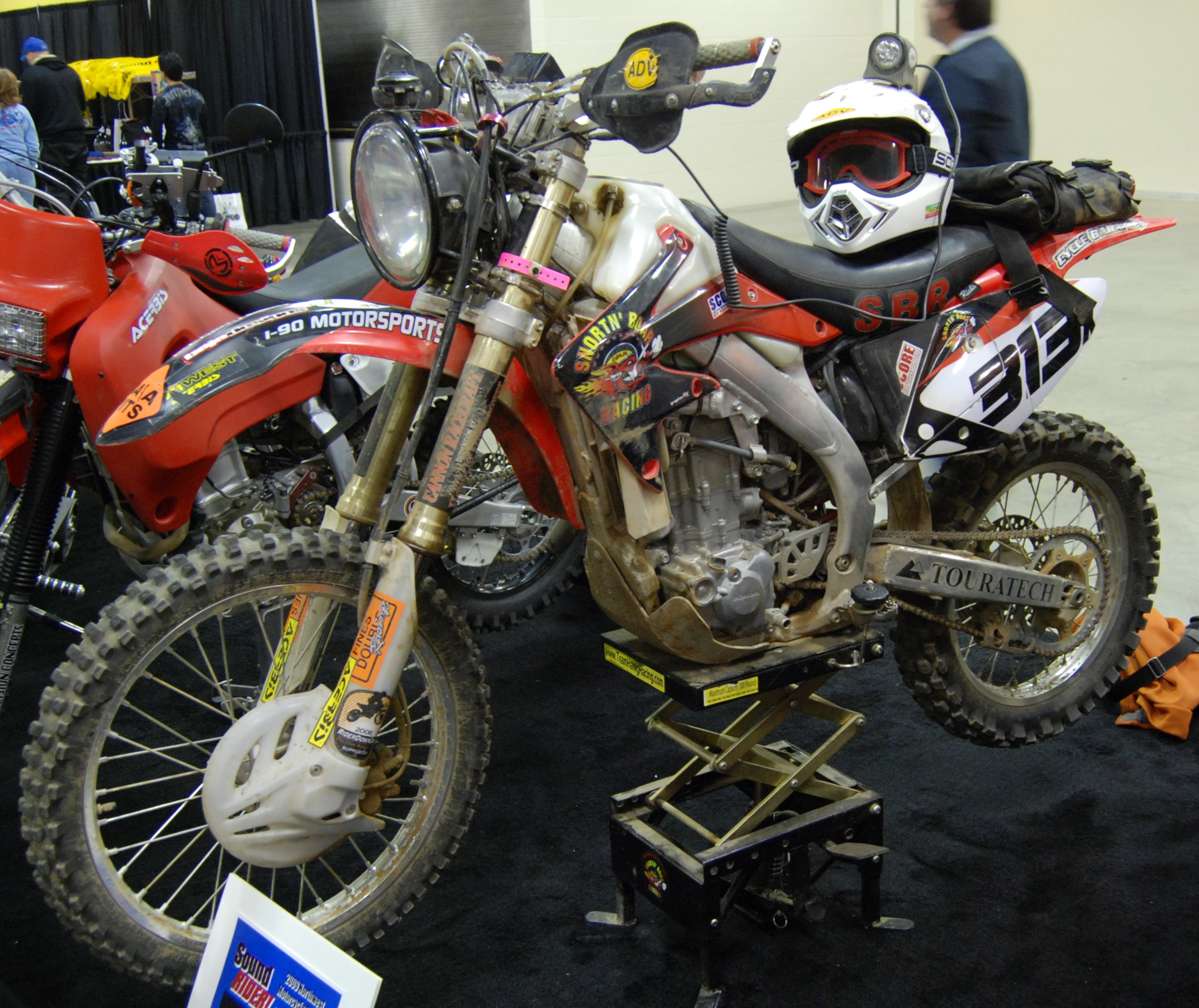
- 2007 Honda CRF450X
- Manufacturer: Honda Motor Company
- Class: Enduro
- Engine: Single-cylinder, SOHC, Multivalve, water-cooled, four-stroke
- Suspension: 47mm Showa Cartridge fork
- Related: Honda CRF250X; Honda CRF450R; Honda CRF450L

The Honda CRF450X is an off-road motorcycle made by Honda Motor Company. It currently has a 450 cc (27 cu in) liquid-cooled single-cylinder engine. First offered in 2005, the CRF450X shares very little with the CRF450R motocrosser.

The CRF450X has seen massive success in the Baja 1000, seeing 11 victories and another 5 wins in the Baja 500. Approximately 27,000 CRF450Xs have sold since October 2018.

== First generation: 2005–2007 ==
The 2005 featured a wide-ratio transmission, electric start, and an 18-inch rear wheel.

== Second generation: 2008–2017 ==
Second Generation CRF450X
- Production: 2008–2017
- Predecessor: First Generation CRF450X
- Successor: Third Generation CRF450X
- Engine: 449cc Liquid-cooled SOHC single-cylinder four-stroke, 96.0mm bore x 62.1mm stroke
- Transmission: 5-speed
- Suspension: Front: 47 mm (1.9 in) inverted Showa coil fork, 12.4 inches travel Rear: Showa shock absorber, 12.4 inches travel
- Brakes: Front: 240 mm (9.4 in) rotor with twin piston caliper Rear: 240 mm (9.4 in) rotor
- Rake, trail: 27.05°, 4.5 in
- Wheelbase: 58.2 in (1,480 mm)
- Seat height: 37.9 in (960 mm)
- Weight: 269 lb (122 kg) (wet)
- Fuel capacity: 1.9 US gal (7.2 L; 1.6 imp gal)

For the 2008 model year, the CRF450X received a steering damper, smaller fuel tank, and a revised accelerator pump.

== Third generation: 2019–present ==
Third Generation CRF450X
- Production: 2019–present
- Predecessor: Second Generation CRF450X
- Engine: 449cc Liquid-cooled SOHC single-cylinder four-stroke, 96.0mm bore x 62.1mm stroke
- Transmission: 6-speed
- Suspension: Front: 49 mm (1.9 in) inverted Showa coil fork Rear: Showa shock absorber
- Brakes: Front: Nissin 260 mm (10 in) rotor with twin piston caliper Rear: 240 mm (9.4 in) rotor
- Rake, trail: 28.0°, 4.6 in
- Wheelbase: 58.8 in (1,490 mm)
- Seat height: 37.4 in (950 mm)
- Weight: 275 lb (125 kg) (wet)
- Fuel capacity: 2.0 US gal (7.6 L; 1.7 imp gal)

For the 2019 model year, the CRF450X was an all new design, receiving fuel injection, and a new CRF450R-based motor and chassis. CRF450X revisions to the motor include more crank mass & revised piston shape.
