= Honda Click =

Series of motor scooters from Honda

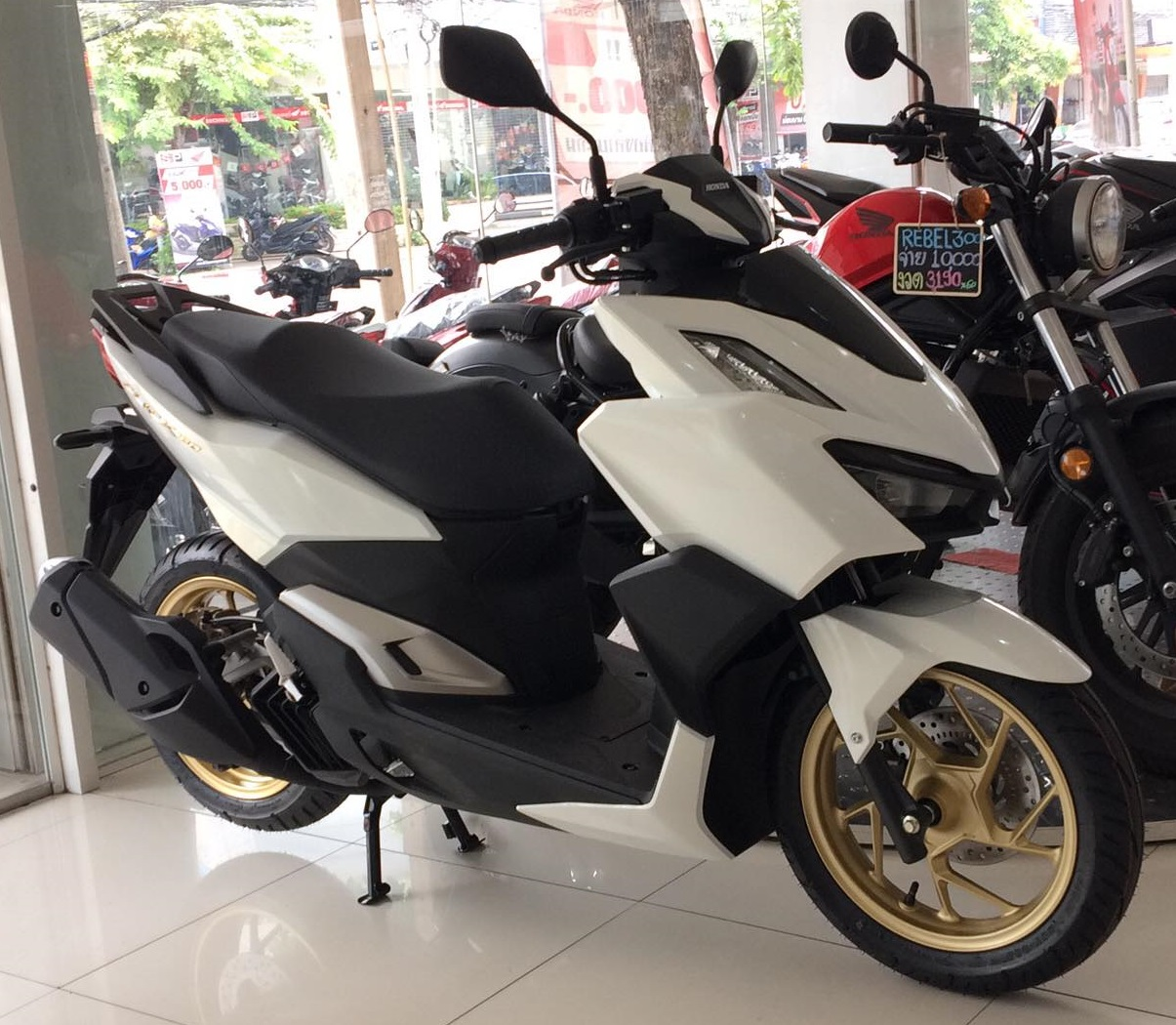
- 2022 Honda Click 160 ABS (Thailand)
- Manufacturer: Honda
- Also called: Honda Vario (Indonesia, Malaysia, and Vietnam); Bahman Ava Click 150 (Iran)
- Production: 2006–present
- Assembly: Indonesia: Cikarang, West Java and Sunter, Jakarta (Astra Honda Motor); Thailand: Bangkok (Honda Motorcycle Thailand); Vietnam: Vinh Phuc (Honda Vietnam Company); Malaysia: Penang (Boon Siew Honda)
- Class: Scooter

The Honda Click (also known as the Honda Vario in Indonesia, Malaysia, and Vietnam) is a series of scooters produced by Honda Motor Company for Southeast Asian markets since 2006. The Click is intended to anticipate the increasing population of scooters circulating in the Indonesian motorcycle market. The Vario has appeared in various variants with engine capacities ranging from 108.0 cc (6.59 cu in) to 157.0 cc (9.58 cu in).

Since its introduction in 2006, the scooter quickly gained popularity due to its fuel efficient engine and comfortable riding experience.

It is designed to cater to urban commuters seeking a convenient and cost-effective means of transportation. It is highly popular in Southeast Asia, especially in Thailand and Indonesia.

== 110 series ==
=== 2006–2014 ===
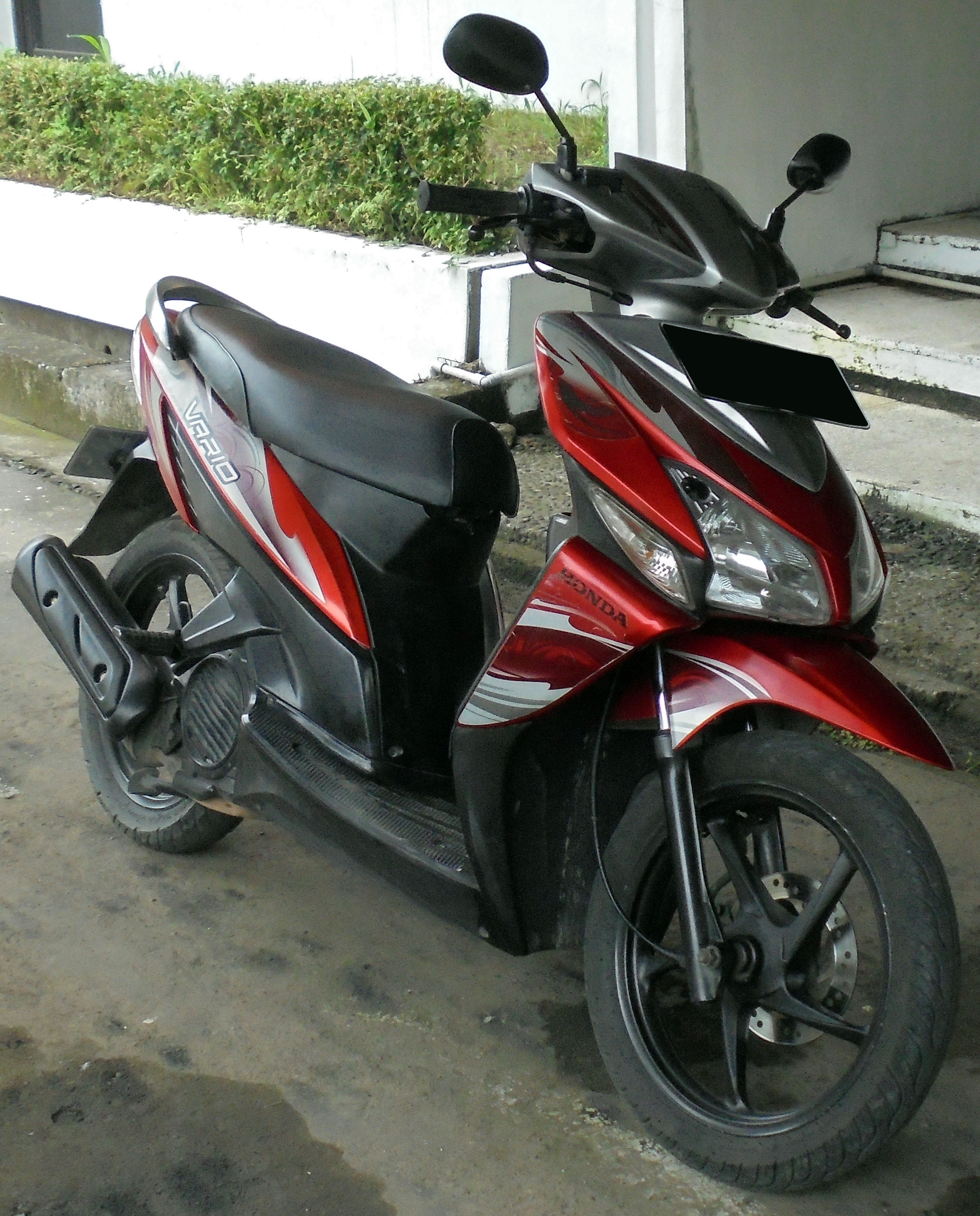
2011 Honda Vario 110 (Indonesia)

The first Click/Vario 110 was released in 2006, introduced to counter the popular Yamaha Mio. It is powered by a 108 single cylinder water cooled engine with a carburetor. In Vietnam, this model has a different end with a big single headlight. In July 2008, a new version was released in Thailand with an updated appearance and the implementation of the Programmed fuel injection (PGM-Fi) technology and marketed as Click-i.

In September 2009, this model was launched in Indonesia as the Vario Techno, positioned as an upmarket version of the standard Vario 110, with the old carbureted engine. In 2012, the Click-i/Techno model were discontinued and were replaced by the Click 125i. The standard model continued to be available in Indonesia until 2014.

=== 2014–2019 ===
In March 2014, the second generation of Vario 110 was launched as the Vario Fi. Unlike the older models, this generation has no Click version and is exclusively available for the Indonesian market. It received an all new 108 cc PGM-Fi fuel injected single cylinder air cooled engine, the only model with such configuration, shared with the smaller Honda BeAT.

In September 2015, an updated version with eSP (enhanced Smart Power) technology was launched. The scooter was available until 2019, when the smaller BeAT took over the 110 cc class market.

== 125 series ==
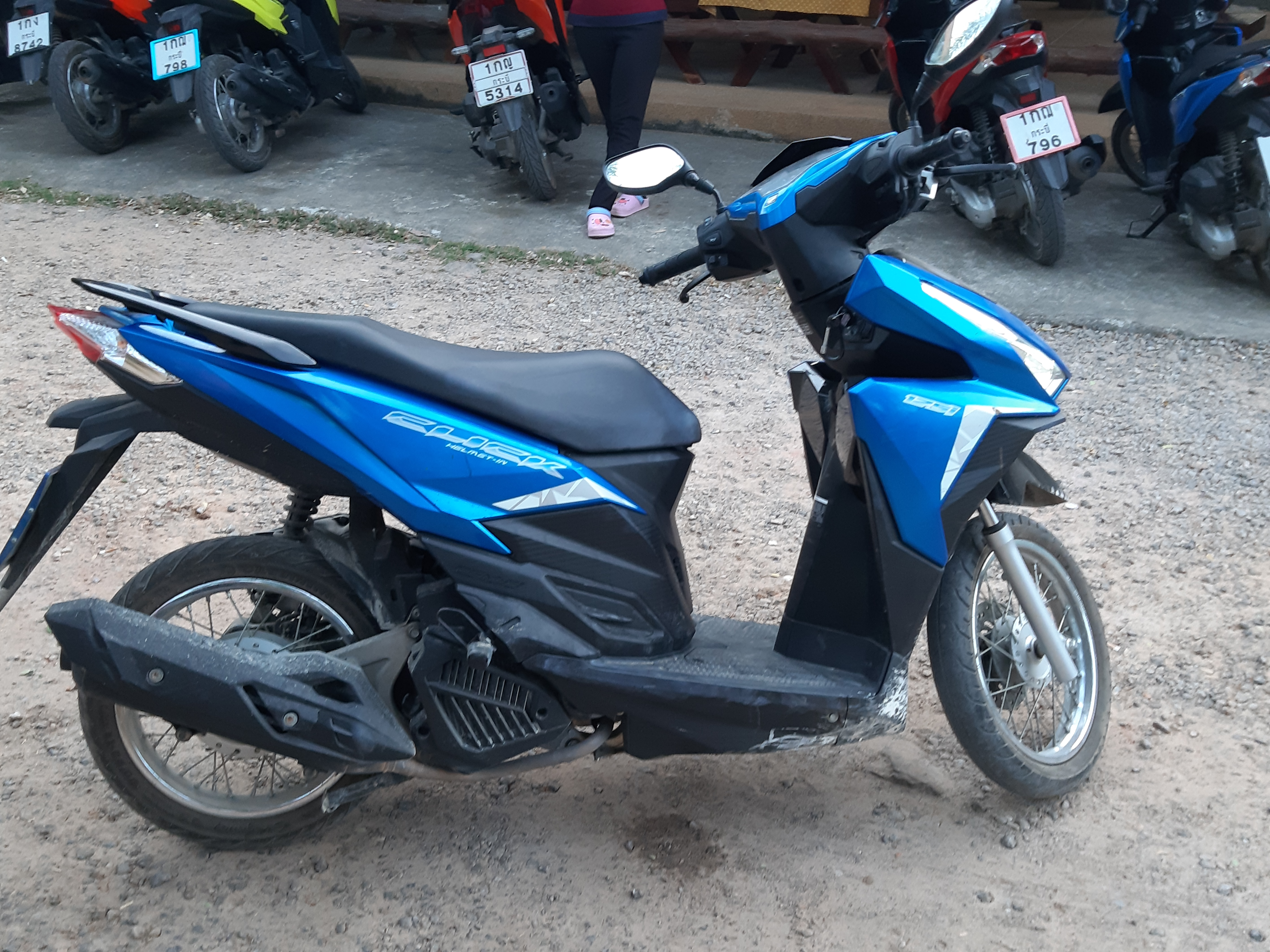
2016 Honda Click 125 (Thailand)

In January 2012, the 125 series was introduced as the Click 125i in Thailand and in March as the Vario Techno 125 Fi in Indonesia.

As of December 2025, 9 million units of the Vario 125 series had been sold in Indonesia since its introduction in 2012.

== 150 series ==
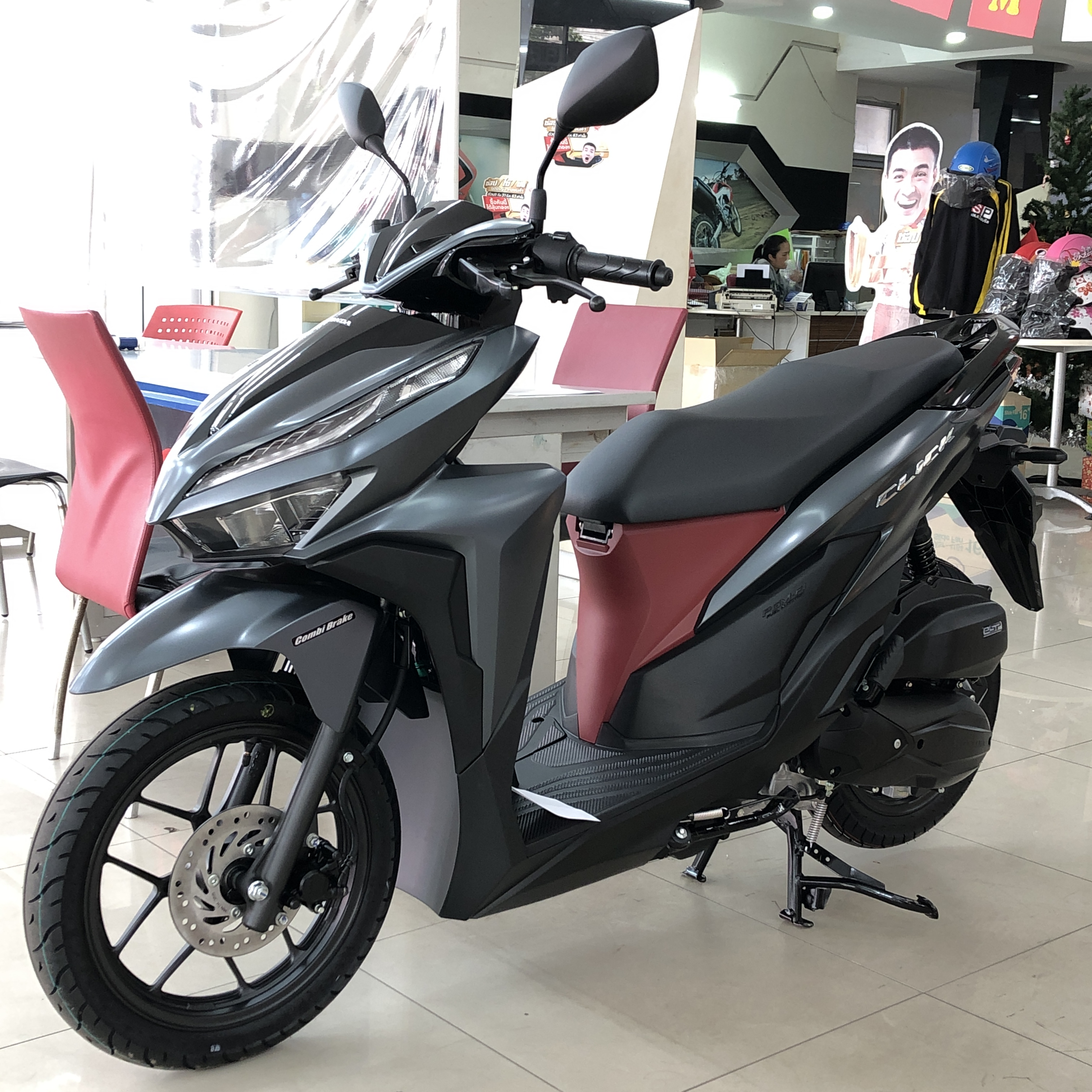
2022 Honda Click 150 (Thailand)

The Click 150 was introduced in January 2015 and uses the same 149.3cc water-cooled engine as found in the Honda PCX 150.

== 160 series ==
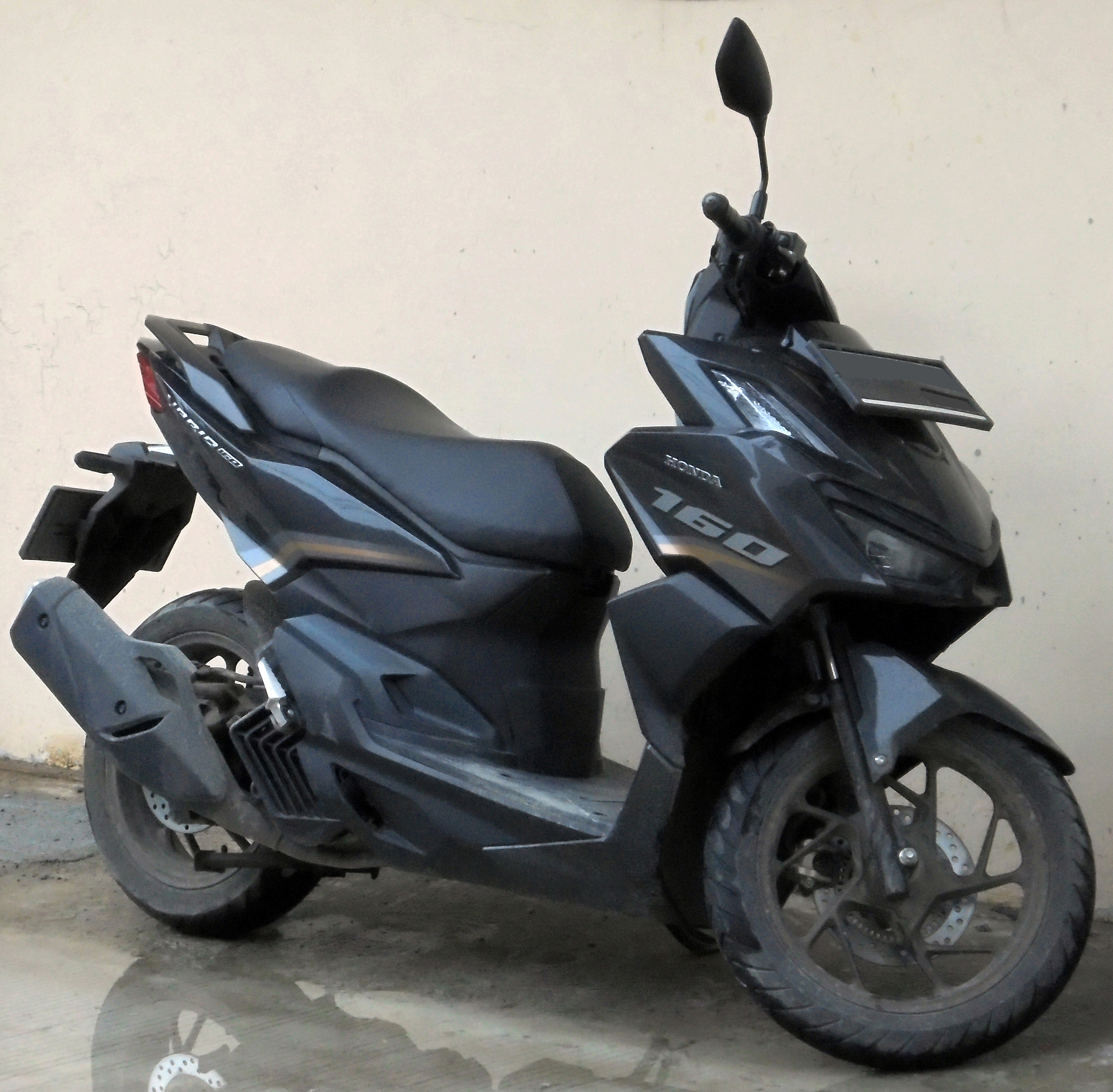
2022 Honda Vario 160 ABS (Indonesia)

In February 2022, the 160 series was introduced first as the Click 160 in Thailand and the Vario 160 in Indonesia. The Vario 160 replaced the Vario 150 in Indonesia.

== Gallery ==
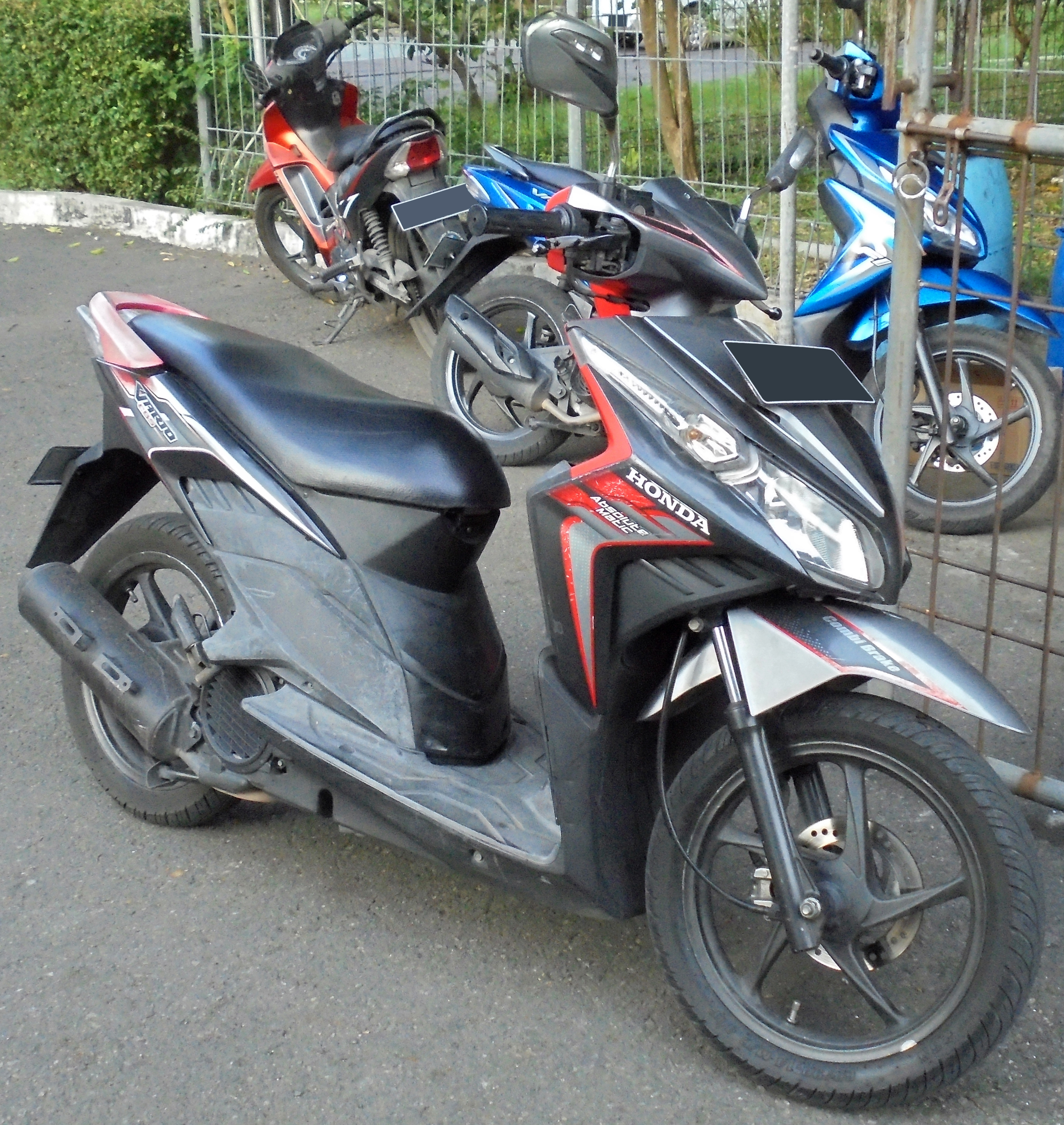
2011 Honda Vario Techno CBS 110 (Indonesia)

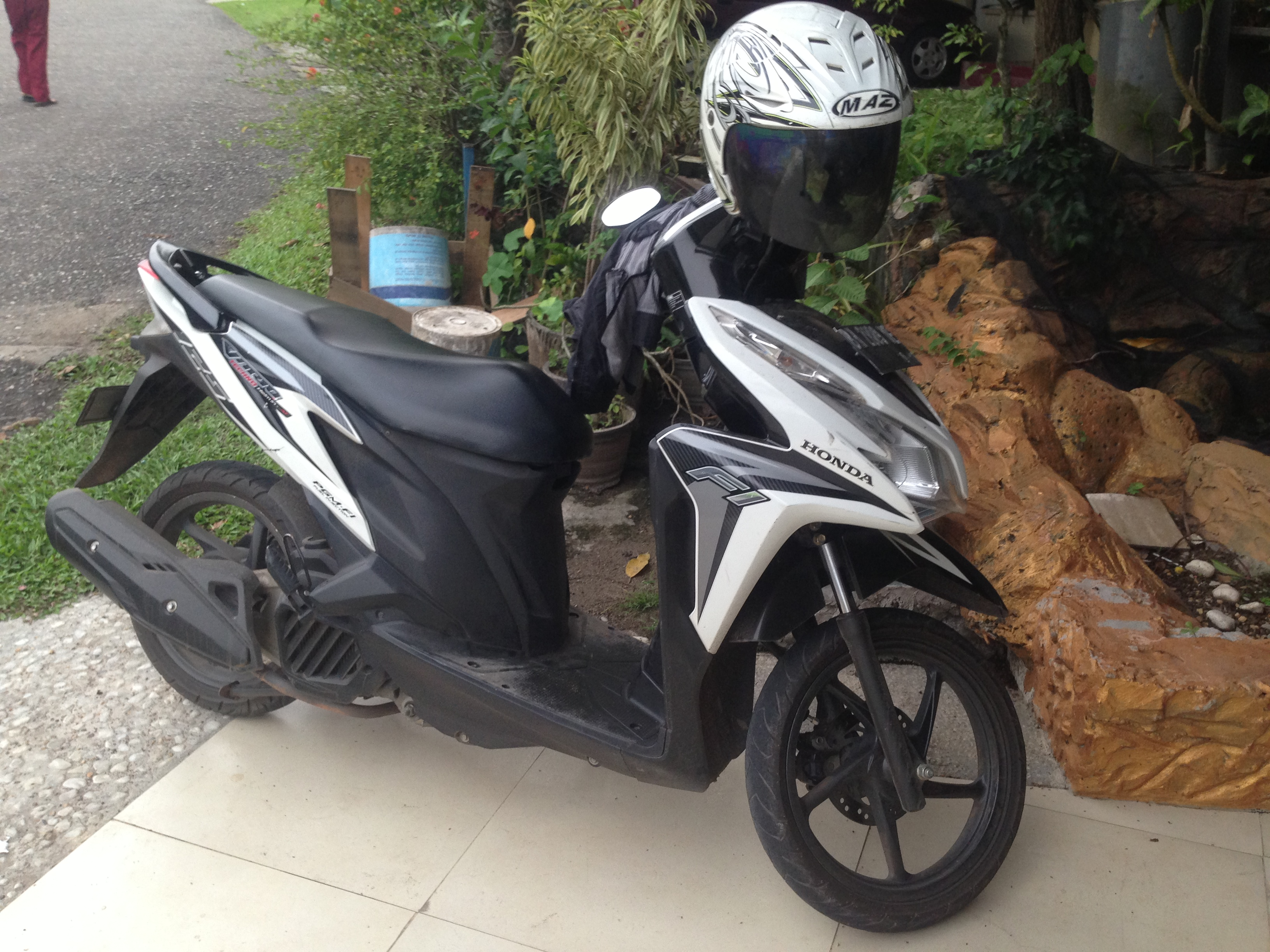
2012 Honda Vario Techno Helm-in AT 125 (Indonesia)

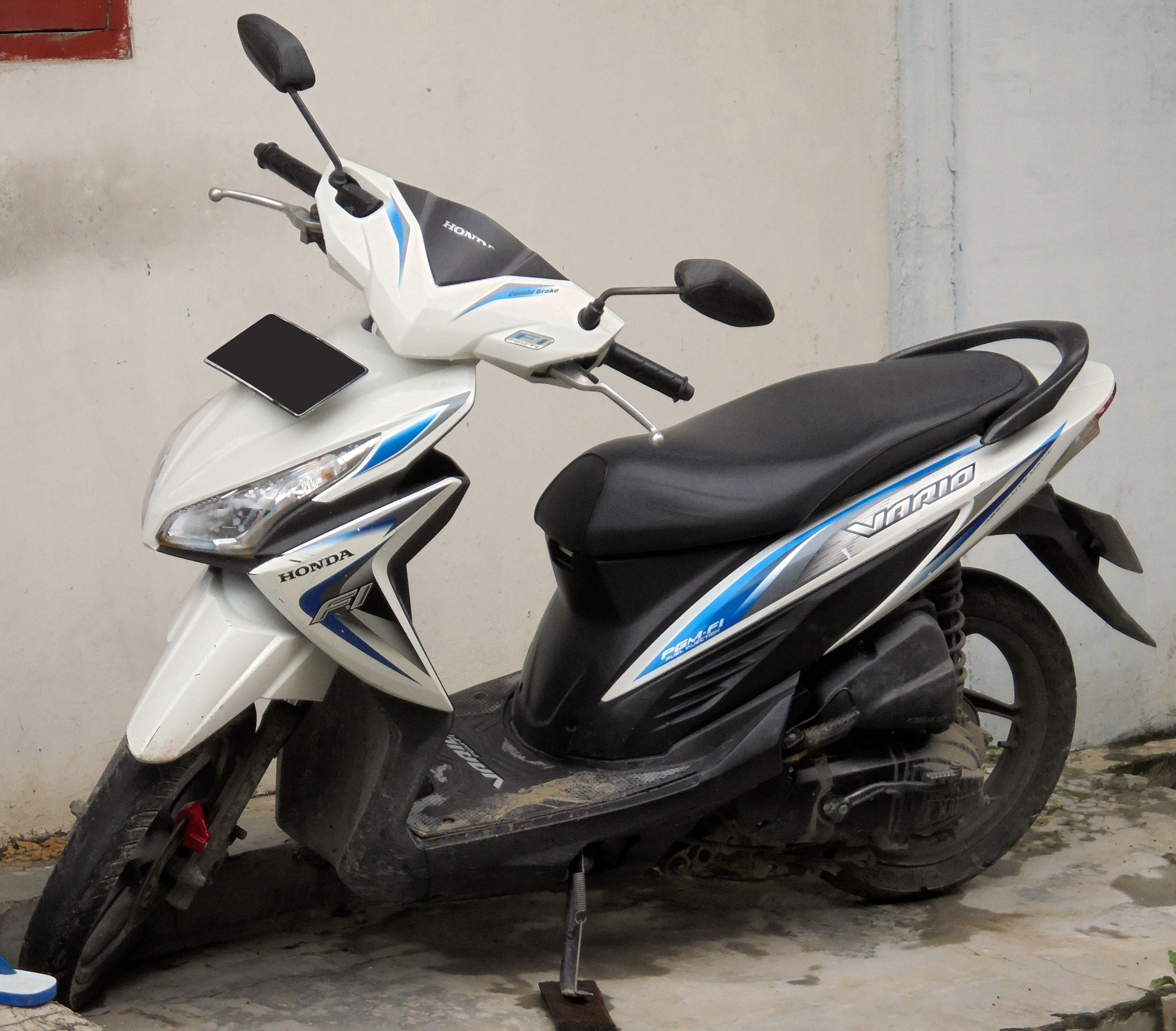
2014 Honda Vario 110 Fi (Indonesia)

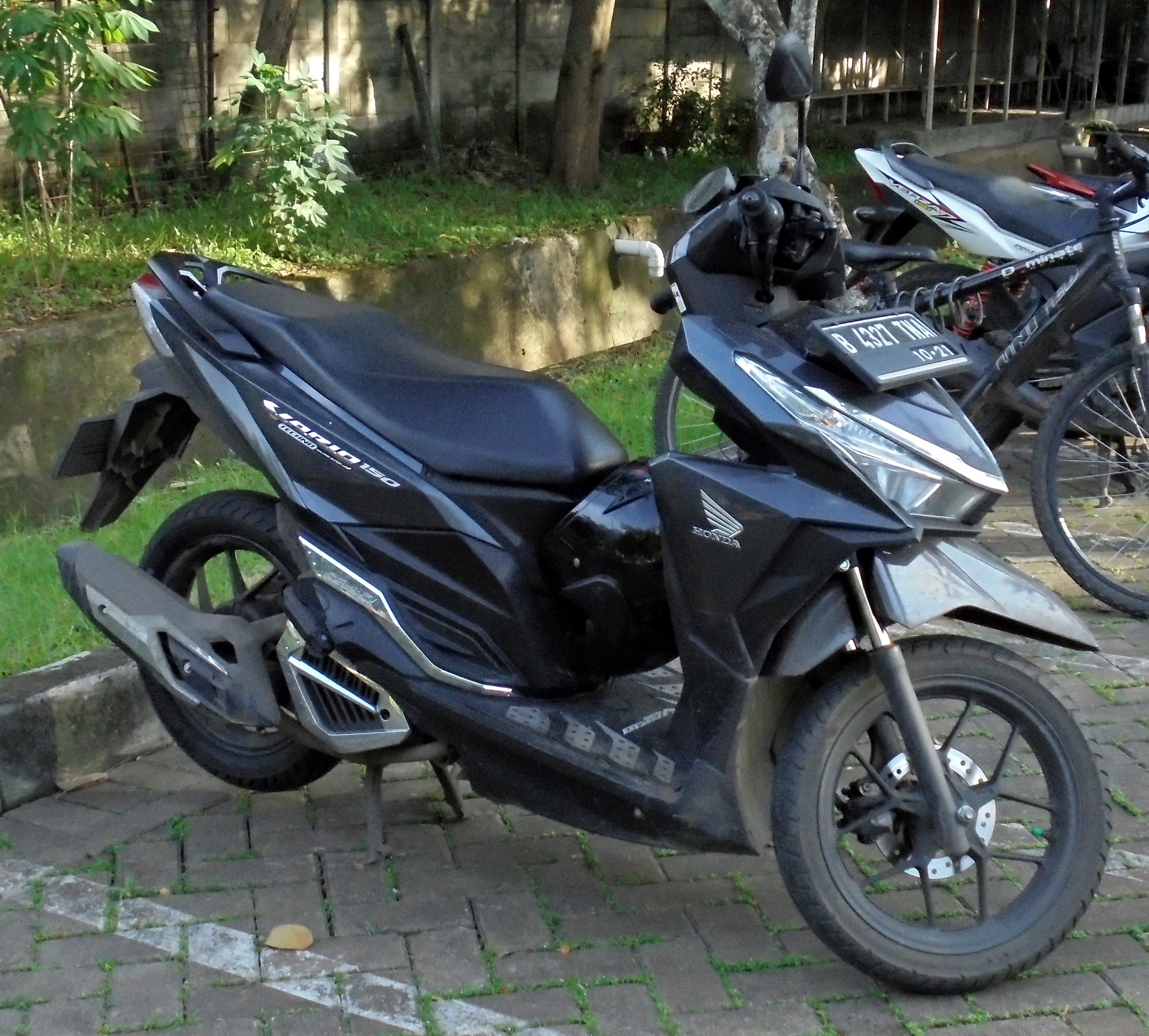
2016 Honda Vario Techno Idling Stop 150 (Indonesia)

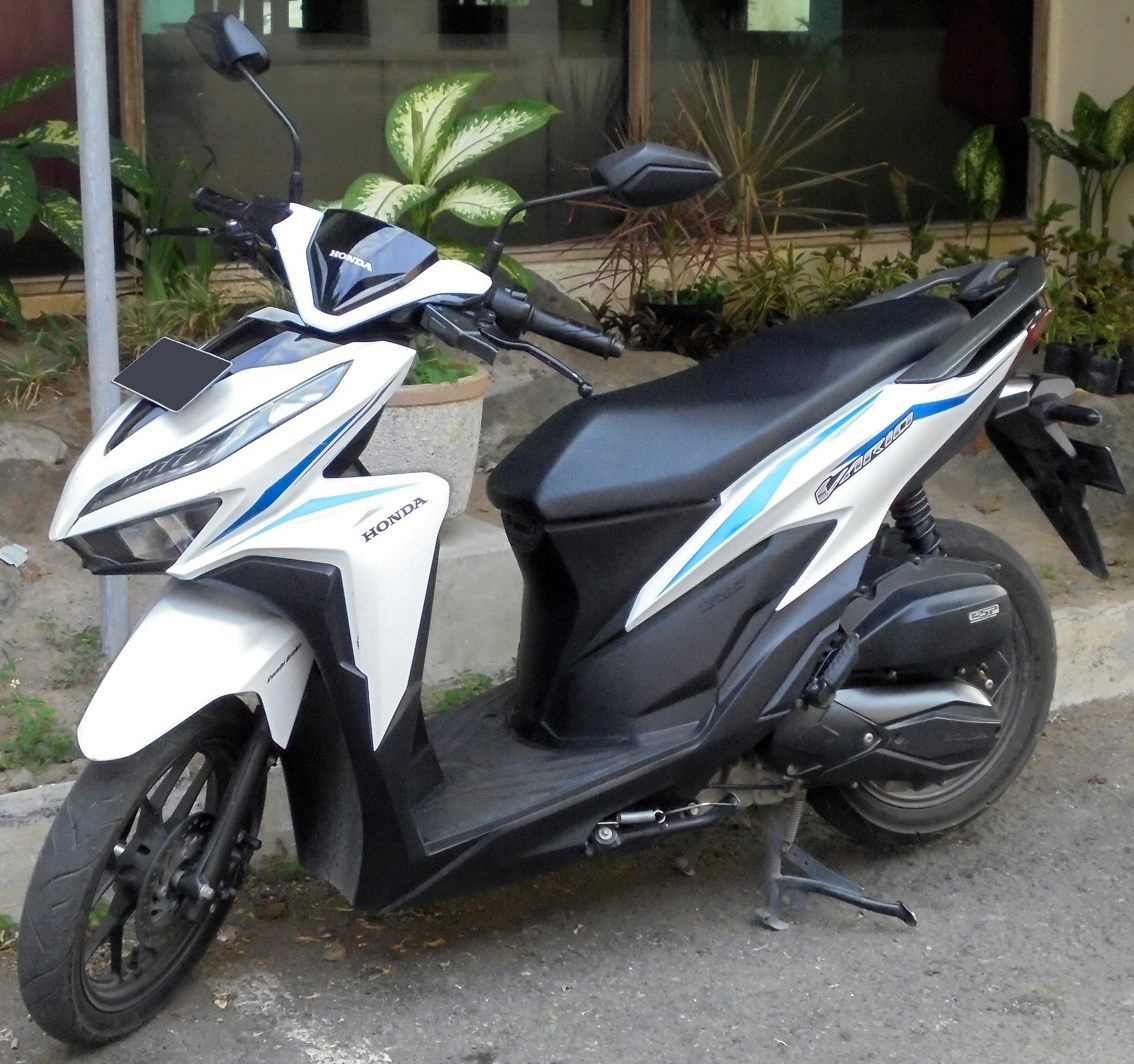
2018 Honda Vario 125 CBS (Indonesia)
