= Honda CRF150L =

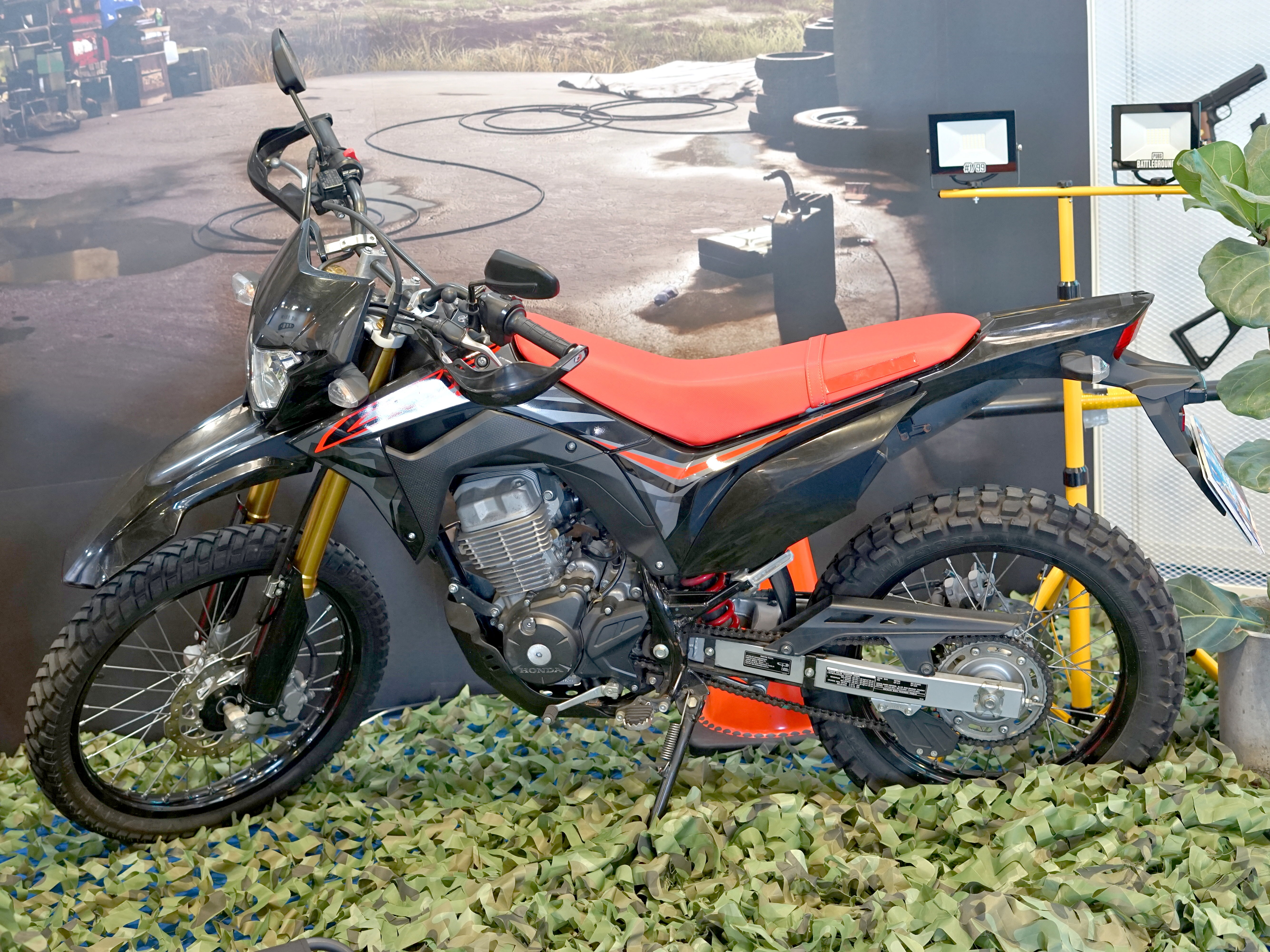
- Manufacturer: Astra Honda Motor
- Parent company: Honda Motor Company
- Production: 2017–present
- Class: Dual-sport
- Engine: 149.15 cc (9.10 cu in) air-cooled 4-stroke 2-valve SOHC single-cylinder
- Bore / stroke: 57.3 mm × 57.8 mm (2.26 in × 2.28 in)
- Compression ratio: 9.5:1
- Top speed: 113 km/h (70 mph)
- Power: 9.51 kW (12.75 hp; 12.93 PS) @ 8,000 rpm (claimed)
- Torque: 12.43 N⋅m (9.17 lbf⋅ft) @ 6,500 rpm (claimed)
- Transmission: 5-speed constant mesh
- Frame type: Semi double cradle
- Suspension: Front: Inverted 37 mm (1.5 in) telescopic fork, 225 mm (8.9 in) stroke Rear: Monoshock with Pro-Link, 207 mm (8.1 in) axle travel
- Brakes: Front: Dual-piston caliper with single 240 mm (9.4 in) disc Rear: Single-piston caliper with single 220 mm (8.7 in) disc
- Tires: Front: 2.75 – 21 45P (tube type); Rear: 4.10 – 18 59P (tube type)
- Wheelbase: 1,375 mm (54.1 in)
- Dimensions: L: 2,119 mm (83.4 in); W: 793 mm (31.2 in); H: 1,153 mm (45.4 in)
- Seat height: 869 mm (34.2 in)
- Weight: 122 kg (269 lb) (wet)
- Fuel capacity: 7.2 L (1.6 imp gal; 1.9 US gal)
- Oil capacity: 1.0 L (0.2 imp gal; 0.3 US gal) (on exchange)

The Honda CRF150L is a CRF series 150 cc (9.2 cu in) dual-sport motorcycle made by Astra Honda Motor, a subsidiary of Honda in Indonesia. It was unveiled in November 2017. It shares an air-cooled 149 cc 4-stroke SOHC single-cylinder EFI engine with the Verza standard motorcycle.

== Performance ==
Some performance tests listed here were conducted by GridOto from Indonesia in December 2017.

Parameter	Time
0–60 km/h (37 mph)	5.6 s
0–80 km/h (50 mph)	9.7 s
0–100 km/h (62 mph)	20.6 s
0–100 m (330 ft)	8.1 s @ 74.6 km/h (46.4 mph)
0–201 m (1/8 mile)	12.6 s @ 89.2 km/h (55.4 mph)
0–402 m (1/4 mile)	20.3 s @ 97 km/h (60 mph)
Top speed (on speedometer)	113 km/h (70 mph)
Top speed (Racelogic)	103 km/h (64 mph)
