= Honda CRF250L =

Dual-Sport Motorcycle

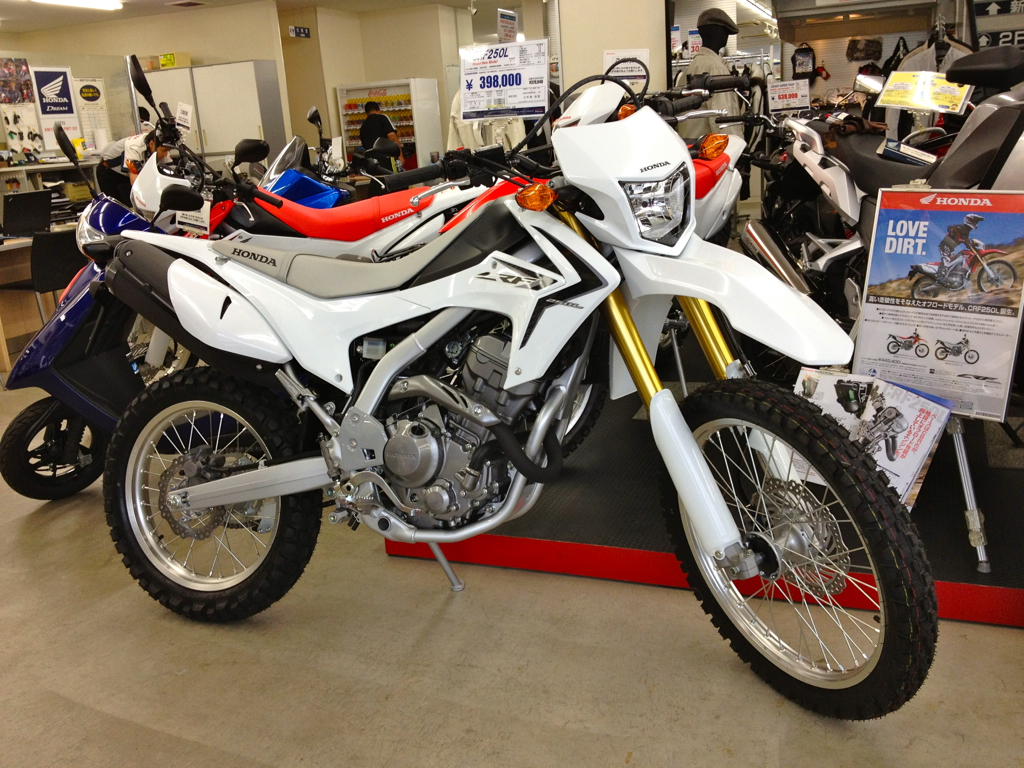
- Manufacturer: Honda
- Production: 2012–2020
- Assembly: Japan
- Class: Dual-sport
- Engine: 249.6 cc (15.23 cu in) liquid-cooled 4-stroke 4-valve DOHC single
- Top speed: 130 km/h (80 mph)

The Honda CRF250L (model designations MD38 and MD44) is a dual-sport motorcycle, part of their CRF series, manufactured for a global market. It was first released in 2012 for the 2013 model year.

It combines a high-efficiency, fuel-injected DOHC single-cylinder counterbalanced engine, and electric starter with a comfortable, neutral seating position, headlight, taillight, turn signals, mirrors, EPA and California Air Resources Board compliant exhaust system.

In 2021 it was replaced by Honda CRF300L. The engine was replaced to be compliant with EURO 5 emissions standard.

== Revision history ==
=== 2012–2016 ===
The original CRF250L was an evolution of the CRF230L incorporating a de-tuned version of the proven engine from the CBR250R (2011) road motorcycle, a redesigned frame, and suspension implementation.

=== 2017 ===
For the 2017 model year, the CRF250L continued to compete with the other 250cc dual-sport motorcycles. There were two additional models the CRF250LA (ABS) and the CRF250L Rally. The rear brake ABS can be deactivated quickly via a handlebar button.

Along with the Rally, the standard model took on the following changes; the engine gained a larger throttle body, new muffler design, revised PGM-FI and airbox, and a larger diameter exhaust header, which increased the engine output by 2HP over the earlier design. Styling changes include a revised speedometer with an rpm counter (tachometer), a folding gear lever, and a changed tail light, and the graphics were also changed to fall in line with the new CRF450R MX bike.

Inspired by the factory CRF450 Rally machine raced in the Dakar by Team HRC, the CRF250L Rally gets the same updated engine as the standard 250L, but it also gets a larger fuel tank, totally new Dakar-style bodywork, handguards, a floating windscreen, skid plate, and even more suspension travel.

=== 2021 ===
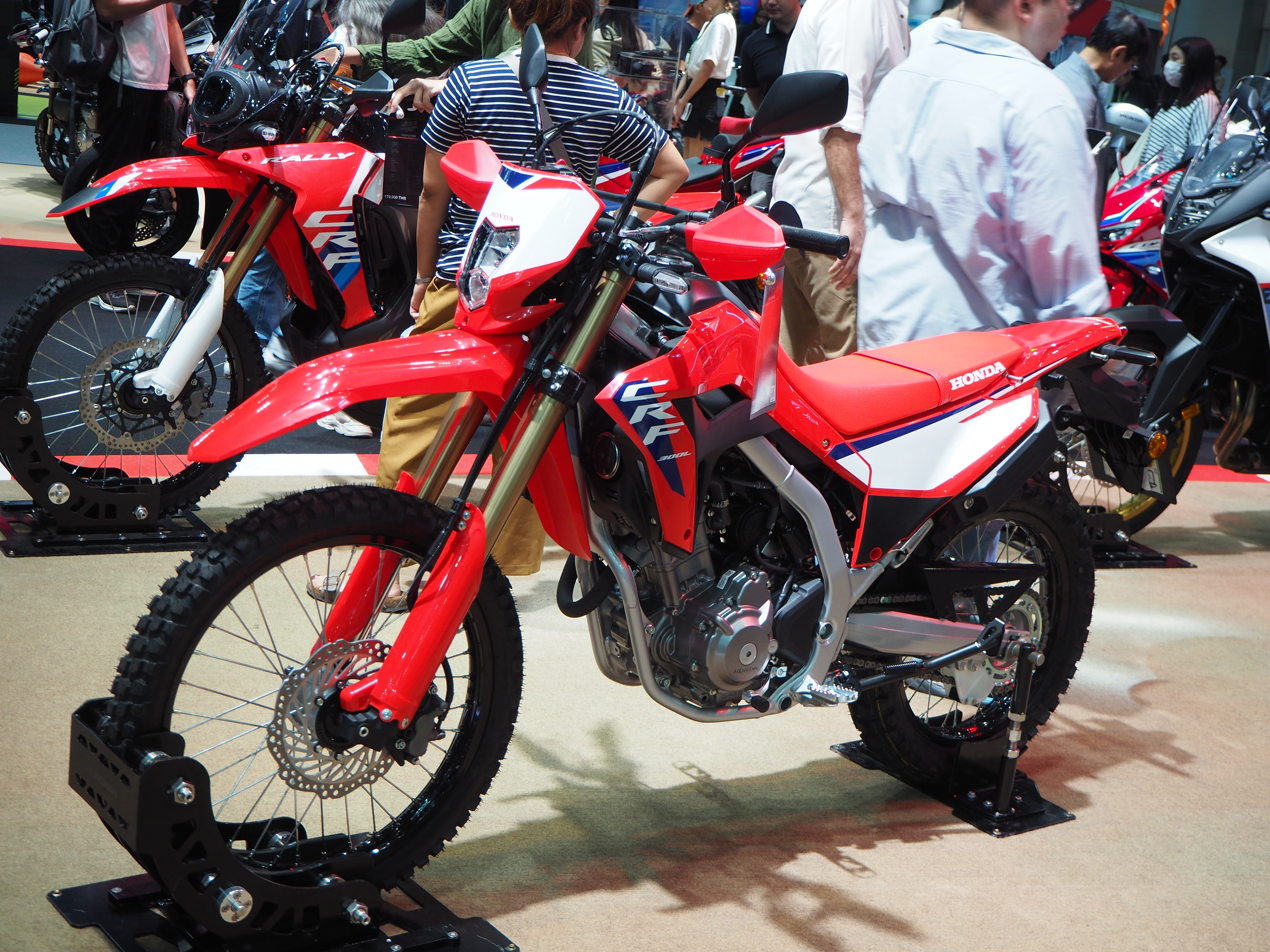
2024 Honda CRF300L

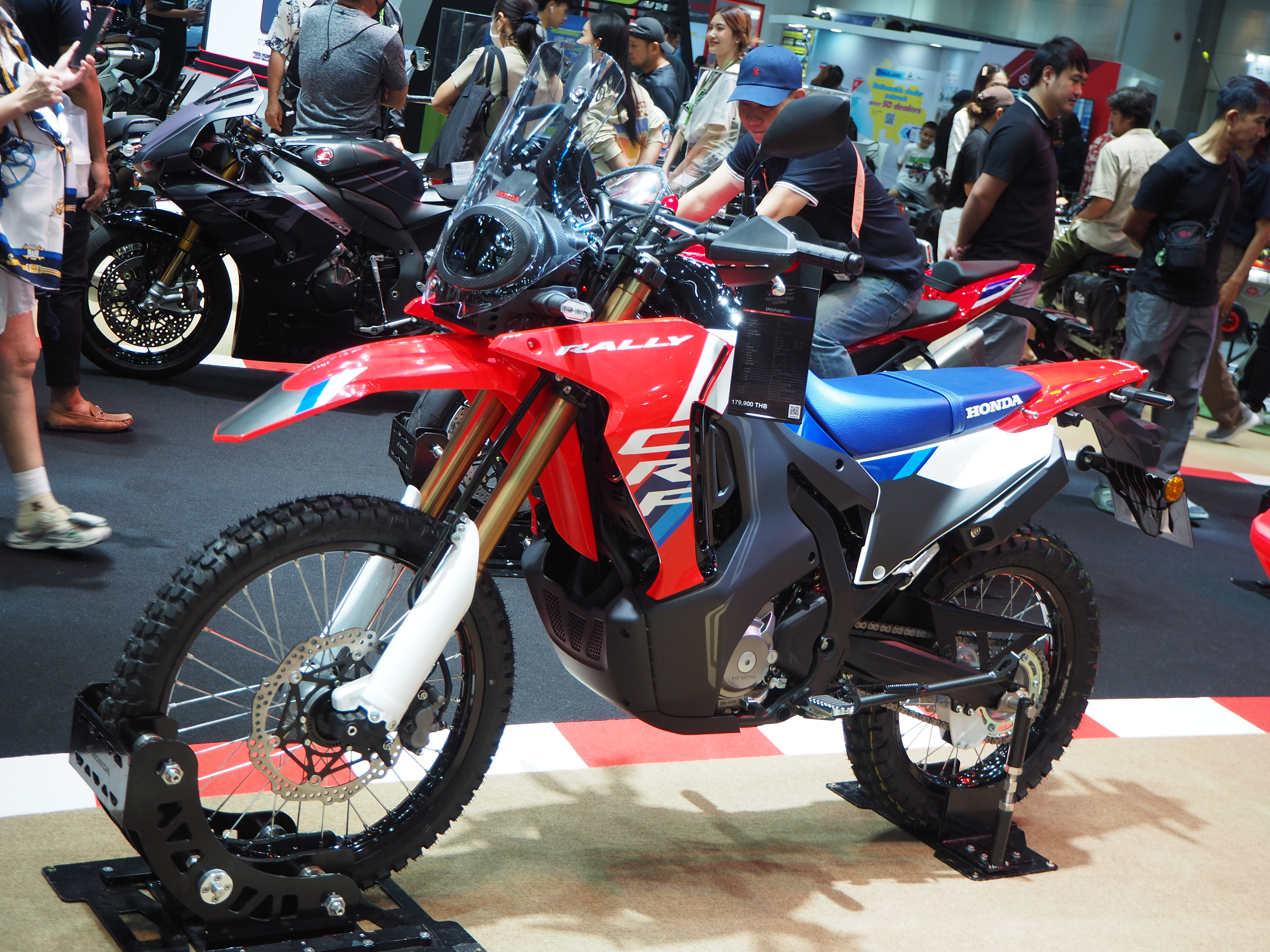
2024 Honda CRF300L Rally

For the 2021 model year, the CRF300L and CRF300 Rally replaced the 250 versions.

Changes included the increase in capacity, weight reduction, front-end geometry, and increased fuel capacity (Rally only). The main change is the Euro 5 compliant engine that is the same engine on CBR 300R with a different camshaft and the resulting reduced power.

=== Differences between L and Rally versions ===
The bikes share most of the parts, but there are some obvious differences and some incompatibilities that may be surprising. The Rally version has a completely different optic block, windshield, fairing, and a larger tank. The seat looks very similar, but due to the tank differences, it is not compatible with L version. The suspension is also different, the 250 Rally has different travel than the 250L.

While a few parts are compatible between the 250 and 300 versions, many are different. Even neutral parts like rear luggage racks are not compatible due to differences in the mount points.

== Specifications ==
250				300	
	2012–2016	L (2017–2020)	Rally (2017 - 2021)	L (2021 - now)	Rally (2021 - now)
Engine	249.6 cc (15.23 cu in) single cylinder 4-stroke liquid-cooled			286 cc (17.5 cu in) single cylinder 4-stroke liquid-cooled	
Bore x stroke	76 mm × 55 mm (3.0 in × 2.2 in)			76 mm × 63 mm (3.0 in × 2.5 in)	
Compression ratio	10.7:1				
Valvetrain	DOHC 4-valve				
Fuel system	Programmed Fuel Injection (PGM-FI)				
Ignition	Computer-controlled digital transistorized with electronic advance				
Power	22.8 hp (17.0 kW)	24.4 hp (18.2 kW) @ 8,500 rpm		27.0 hp (20.1 kW) @ 8,500 rpm	
Torque	16.2 lb⋅ft (22.0 N⋅m)	16.7 lbf⋅ft (22.6 N⋅m) @ 6,750 rpm		19.6 lbf⋅ft (26.6 N⋅m) @ 6,500 rpm	
Transmission	Wet multi-plate hydraulic, constant mesh 6-speed, chain 14T/40T			Wet multi-plate hydraulic, constant mesh 6-speed, #520 chain 14T/40T	
Front suspension	Showa telescopic upside down Diameter: 43mm Travel: 222mm (8.2 in)			Showa telescopic upside down Diameter: 43mm Travel: 260 mm (10.2 in)	
Rear suspension	Showa mono-shock Pro-Link with preload adjustability Travel: 240mm (9.4 in)			Showa mono-shock Pro-Link with preload adjustability Travel: 260 mm (10.2 in)	
Brakes	Nissin hydraulic single wave disc, ABS for 2017 model Front: dual piston Rear: single piston			Nissin hydraulic single wave disc, ABS available Front: 256 mm (10.1 in) disc; dual piston Rear: 220 mm (8.7 in) disc; single piston	Nissin hydraulic single wave disc, ABS available Front: 296 mm (11.7 in) disc; dual piston Rear: 220 mm (8.7 in) disc; single piston
Tires	Front : 3.00-21 51P; Rear : 120/80-18 62P			Front : 80/100-21 51P; Rear : 120/80-18 62P	
Frame	Steel twin tube				
Wheelbase	1,445 mm (56.9 in)		1,455 mm (57.3 in)		
Ground clearance	255 mm (10.0 in)		270 mm (11 in)	285 mm (11.2 in)	275 mm (10.8 in)
Curb weight	144 kg (317 lb)	146 kg (322 lb)	157 kg (346 lb)	142 kg (313 lb)	153 kg (337 lb)
Maximum load	145 kg (320 lb)	145 kg (320 lb)	145 kg (320 lb)	160 kg (350 lb)	160 kg (350 lb)
Fuel capacity	7.7 L (1.7 imp gal; 2.0 US gal)	7.8 L (1.7 imp gal; 2.1 US gal)	10.1 L (2.2 imp gal; 2.7 US gal)	7.8 L (1.7 imp gal; 2.1 US gal)	12.8 L (2.8 imp gal; 3.4 US gal)
Fuel Consumption	?			32.3 km/L (91 mpg_{‑imp}; 76 mpg_{‑US}) ^{*claimed}	
Oil capacity	1.8 L (0.40 imp gal; 0.48 US gal)				
Dimension	L : 2,195 mm (86.4 in); W : 815 mm (32.1 in); H : 1,195 mm (47.0 in)		L : 2,210 mm (87 in); W : 900 mm (35 in); H : 1,425 mm (56.1 in)	L : 2,230 mm (88 in); W : 820 mm (32 in); H : 1,200 mm (47 in)	L : 2,230 mm (88 in); W : 920 mm (36 in); H : 1,415 mm (55.7 in)
Seat height	875 mm (34.4 in)		895 mm (35.2 in)	880 mm (35 in)	885 mm (34.8 in)
Rake, Trail	27.6°, 113 mm (4.4 in)		28.1°, 114 mm (4.5 in)	27.5°, 109 mm (4.3 in)	
