= Showa Corporation =

Japanese vehicle suspension brand

Showa

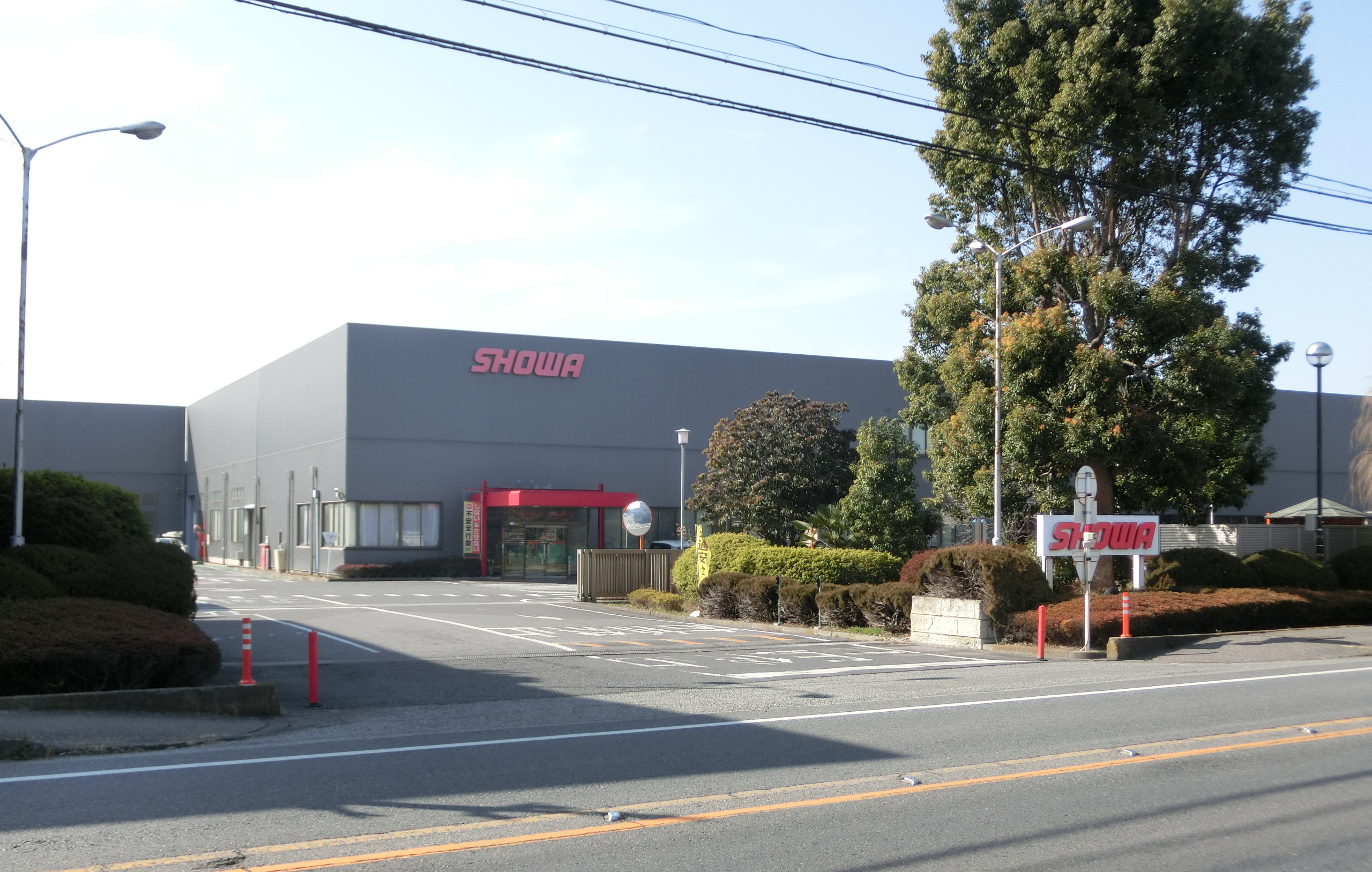
- Headquarters in Gyoda, Japan
- Type: Brand
- Industry: Automotive
- Founded: October 28, 1938; 87 years ago
- Headquarters: Gyoda, Saitama Prefecture, 361-850, Japan
- Area served: Worldwide
- Key people: Nobuyuki Sugiyama (President)
- Products: Automotive components; Motorcycle components; Outboard components
- Revenue: ▲JPY 291.9 billion (FY 2017) (US$ 2.7 billion) (FY 2017)
- Net income: ▲JPY 13.8 billion (FY 2017) (US$ 130.7 million) (FY 2017)
- Number of employees: 12,761 (consolidated, as of March 31, 2018)
- Parent: Astemo

Showa is a brand of high-performance automotive, motorcycle and outboard suspension systems of Astemo, based in Gyoda, Saitama in Japan. The company was founded in 1938 as Showa Aircraft Precision Works. In 2021, it was merged with Keihin and Nissin Kogyo into Hitachi Automotive Systems to form Astemo.

== History ==
The company was founded in 1938 as Showa Aircraft Precision Works. In Japan's drive to develop its military capability in preparation for World War II, Showa supplied aircraft suspension and landing systems to various aircraft manufacturers.

Banned from developing or manufacturing aircraft systems after the war, Showa entered the car components industry, using its aircraft knowledge to develop specialist suspension products for motorcycles made by the new company Honda. The relationship between Showa and Honda developed over the years, with Honda Racing Corporation accounting for more than 50% of Showa's business.

In 1950 Showa acquired Rikuo Motorcycle, which made licensed versions of Harley Davidson motorcycles in the 1930s and 1940s. Rikuo brand lasted until 1962. Showa has since become OEM supplier to Harley Davidson.

Showa has overseas facilities in Brazil, Canada, China, India, Indonesia, Mexico, Spain, Taiwan, Thailand, United Kingdom, United States and Vietnam.

Showa was an official IndyCar Series dampers, springs and shock absorber supplier from 2007 to 2011 alongside Penske Racing Shocks which only supplying shocks for Team Penske. Showa remained IndyCar Series shock absorber supplier since 2012 but only for Honda-powered teams.

== Merger ==
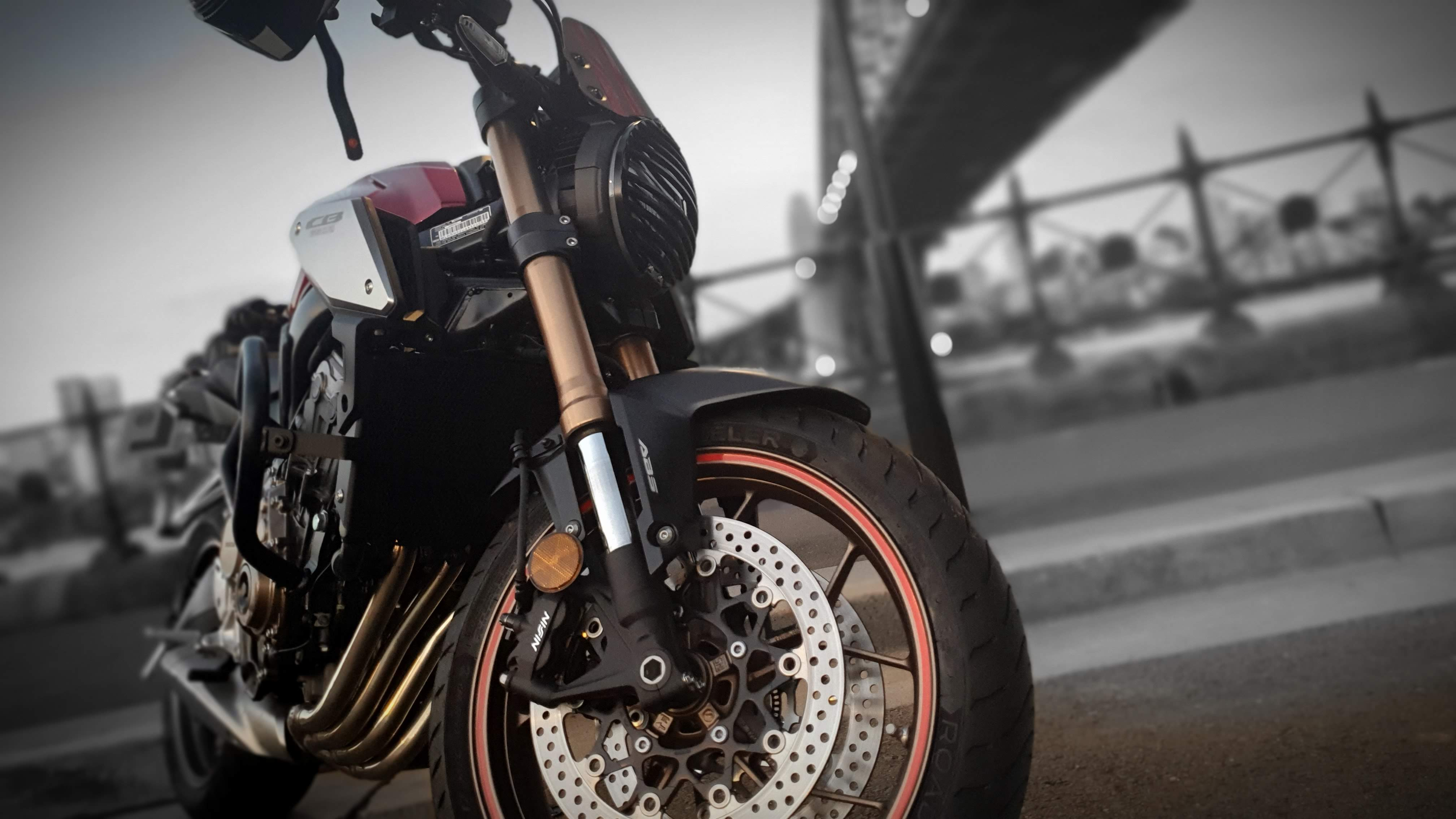
Honda CB650R with Showa front suspension

In October 2019, Showa began to be merged into Hitachi Automotive Systems as their supplier of steering and suspension components, along with Keihin and Nissin Kogyo, also partners of both Honda and Hitachi. The merger was completed in January 2021, with the resulting parts supplier known as Astemo. The Showa brand continues to be used within this structure.

== See also ==
- Shock absorber
- Motorcycle suspension
- Motorcycle fork
- Showa Aircraft Industry
