= Honda Z50RD =

1986 Honda Z series minibike

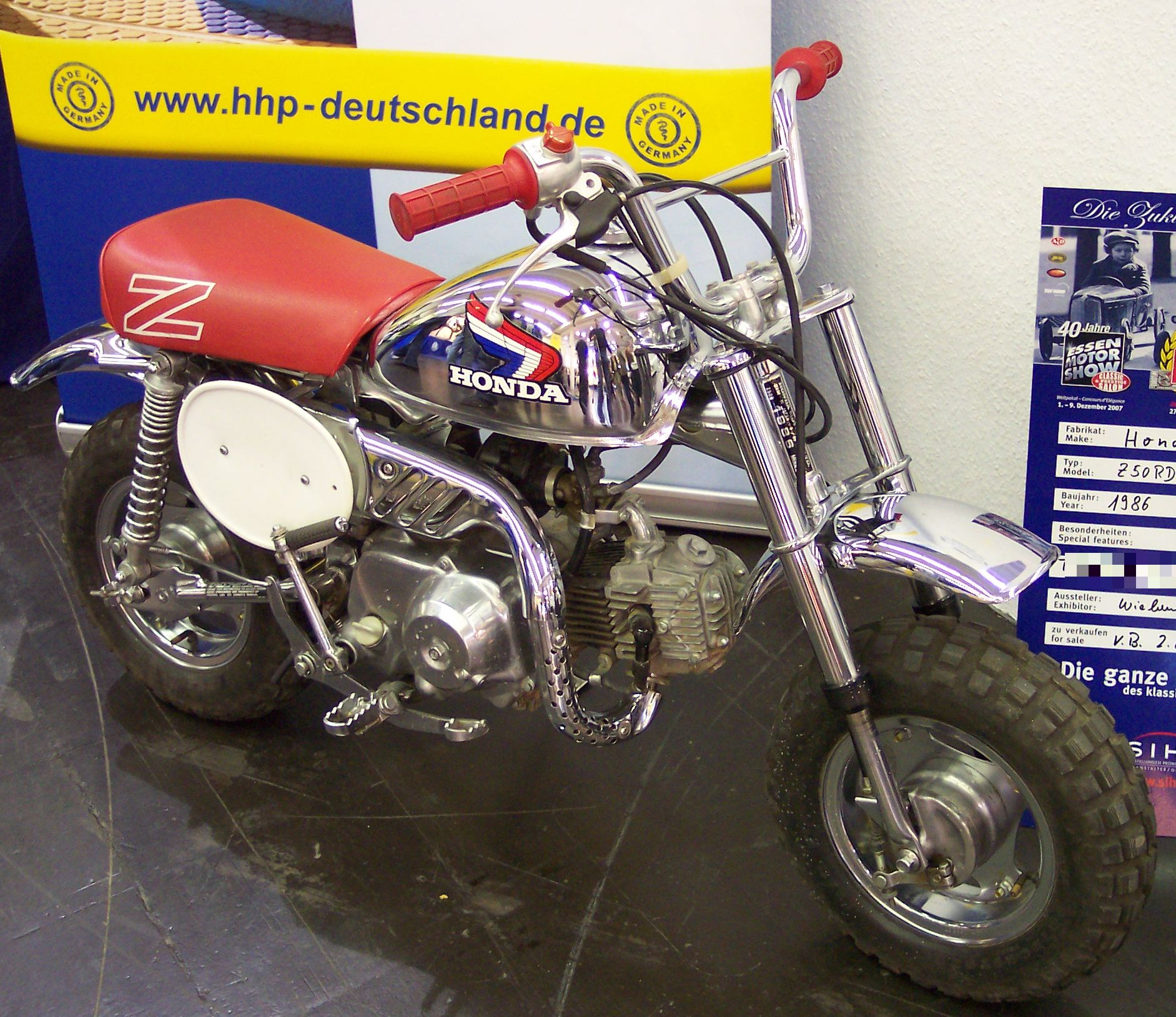
- Manufacturer: Honda
- Also called: Christmas Special
- Production: 1986
- Predecessor: Honda Z50A
- Successor: Honda XR50R
- Class: Minibike
- Engine: 49 cc (3.0 cu in), OHC, air cooled, four stroke, single
- Transmission: 3-speed semi-automatic transmission
- Frame type: Backbone
- Brakes: Drum
- Tires: 3.50-8
- Related: Honda Z100; Honda Z series; Honda Z50M; Honda Z50A; Honda Z50J

The Honda Z50RD, also known as the Christmas Special or the Chrome Edition, is an all-chrome Honda Z series minibike released in 1986. A limited edition of the Honda Z50R (Note: The D in the name of the Z50RD stands for dealer.), it is considered to be rare.

== Specifications ==
The Z50RD has the same specifications as the 1986 Honda Z50R: a 49 cc single-piston engine, three-speed transmission, and drum brakes. The distinguishing feature of the Z50RD is that most of its visible parts—including the fuel tank, fenders, exhaust, forks, frame, wheels, and handlebars—are chromed. The wheel hubs, and the parts of the motor that are not chromed, are polished and clear-coated.

== History ==
Z50RDs were manufactured in July or August 1986, and shipped to Honda dealers in December. The combined total of Z50Rs and Z50RDs shipped by Honda in 1986 was 11,652, but the total number for Z50RDs alone is unknown. Nor is it known how many dealers were allowed to purchase Z50RDs, but some collectors believe each dealer could buy two; there were 805 Honda dealers in the United States in the 1980s.

The Z50RD received the nicknames "Christmas Special"—because it was shipped in December 1986, and had a decal on its fuel tank reading "Special"—and "Chrome Edition", after its extensive use of chrome. Upon its release, it did not sell quickly, but by 2016, it had become highly sought after by collectors as a rarity. The 2021 National Automobile Dealers Association guide valued a Z50RD in excellent condition at $9,385.

== See also ==
- List of scooter manufacturers
- Minibike
- Pocketbike
- Pit bike
