= Honda Z50R =

Motorcycle

Z50R
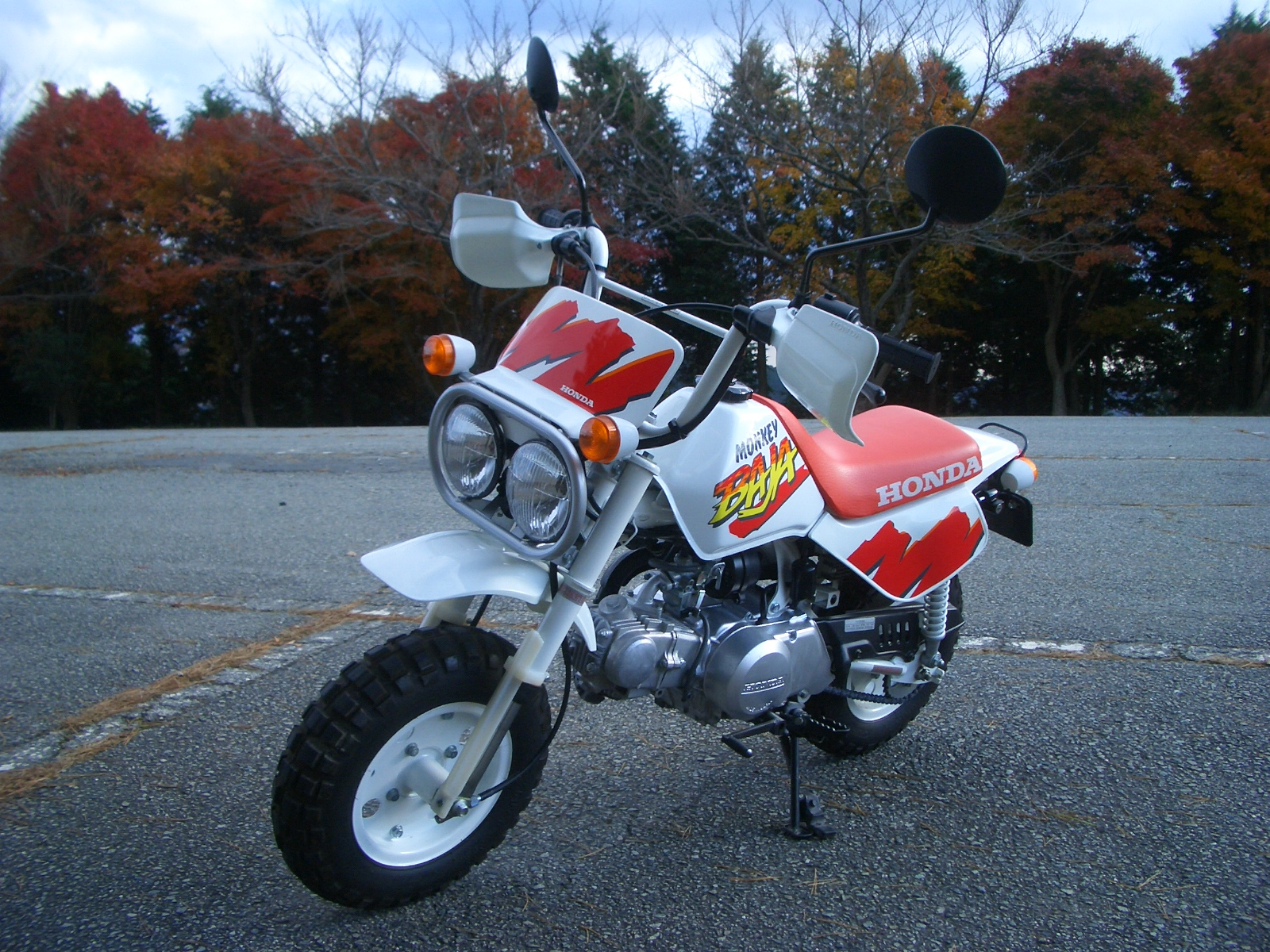
- 1993 Honda Z50J Baja - This is Japan's improved version of the Z50R
- Manufacturer: Honda
- Production: 1979–1999
- Predecessor: Honda Z50A
- Successor: Honda XR50R
- Class: Minibike
- Engine: 49 cc (3.0 cu in), OHC, air-cooled, four stroke, single
- Transmission: 3-speed semi-automatic transmission
- Frame type: Backbone
- Related: Honda Z100 *Honda Z series, *Honda Z50M, *Honda Z50A, *Honda Z50J

The Honda Z50R is a motorcycle produced by Honda, in the Honda Z series family of minibikes. It began production in 1979 as Honda's answer to the increasing demand for mini dirt bikes to be used on the track, as opposed to their traditional trail bike used more for leisure, such as the Z50A and Z50J.

In 1986 Honda produced a "Special Edition" all chrome dealer model of the Z50R which they called the Z50RD. The RD had similar specs, but it was almost all chrome and polished, with red grips and seat.

The Z50R quickly evolved into a light-weight mini racing motorcycle until 1999, when it was replaced by the Honda XR50R in 2000.

== See also ==
- List of scooter manufacturers
- Minibike
- Pocketbike
- Pit bike
