= Honda CZ100 =

Honda's first production minibike

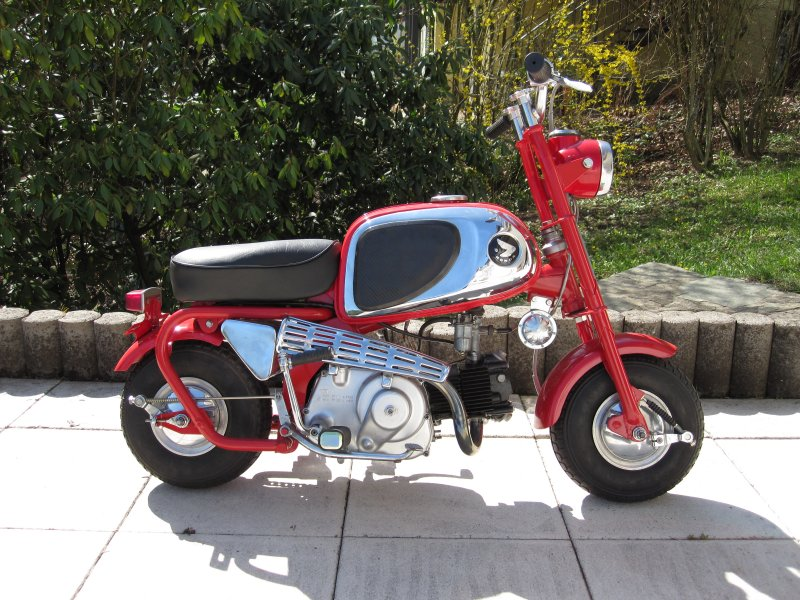
- CZ100 Mark II
- Manufacturer: Honda
- Also called: Mark I and Mark II
- Production: 1963-1966
- Predecessor: Honda Z100
- Successor: Honda Z50M
- Class: Minibike
- Engine: 49 cc (3.0 cu in), OHV, air cooled, four stroke, single
- Transmission: 3-speed semi-automatic transmission
- Frame type: Backbone
- Brakes: Drum
- Related: Honda Z100 *Honda Z series, *Honda Z50M, *Honda Z50A, *Honda Z50J

Honda CZ100 was the Honda Motor Company's first minibike which was sold to consumers. The CZ100 minibike was first introduced in 1963 after Honda saw how well their Honda Z100 prototype was received at The Tama Tech park.

== Background ==
In 1961 the Honda Motor Company opened the Tama Tech park. The park attractions involved motorsports. It was at the park Honda first introduced a minibike called the Honda Z100. Honda recognized that the bike was popular with park visitors. When Honda first developed the Z100 minibike it was never meant to be a commercial product, it was only meant to be an attraction at the park.

== History ==
Honda recognized the popularity of the Z100 minibike and they decided to manufacture a street-legal version of the bike. By 1963 they had created a production version of the minibike and they called it the CZ100 Mark I. The 1963 CZ100 Mark I series, had a white fuel tank and a rigid frame which was painted red. In 1964 they released the bike in the Japanese market and called it the CZ100. The CZ100 Mark II series was then produced and it was virtually identical to the Mark I series with the exception of paint: the tank and frame were both painted red. Honda continued to produce the CZ100 but it was not sold to consumers in the United States. In recent years collectors have begun to import examples of the bike from Europe.

The CZ100 was street legal and only offered to consumers in European and Asian countries. The minibike sold enough for production of the bike to continue until 1966.

== Specifications ==
The Minibike was fitted with a 49 cc engine. Honda had much success with the 49cc, and it was fitted in other bikes like the Honda Super Cub. The CZ100 had small 5" wheels and the minibike had a white fuel tank and a bright red frame.

Honda also used a fuel tank which was meant for another bike: they used the tank from the Honda C110.

== See also ==
- List of scooter manufacturers
- Minibike
- Pocketbike
- Pit bike
