= Honda ZB50 =

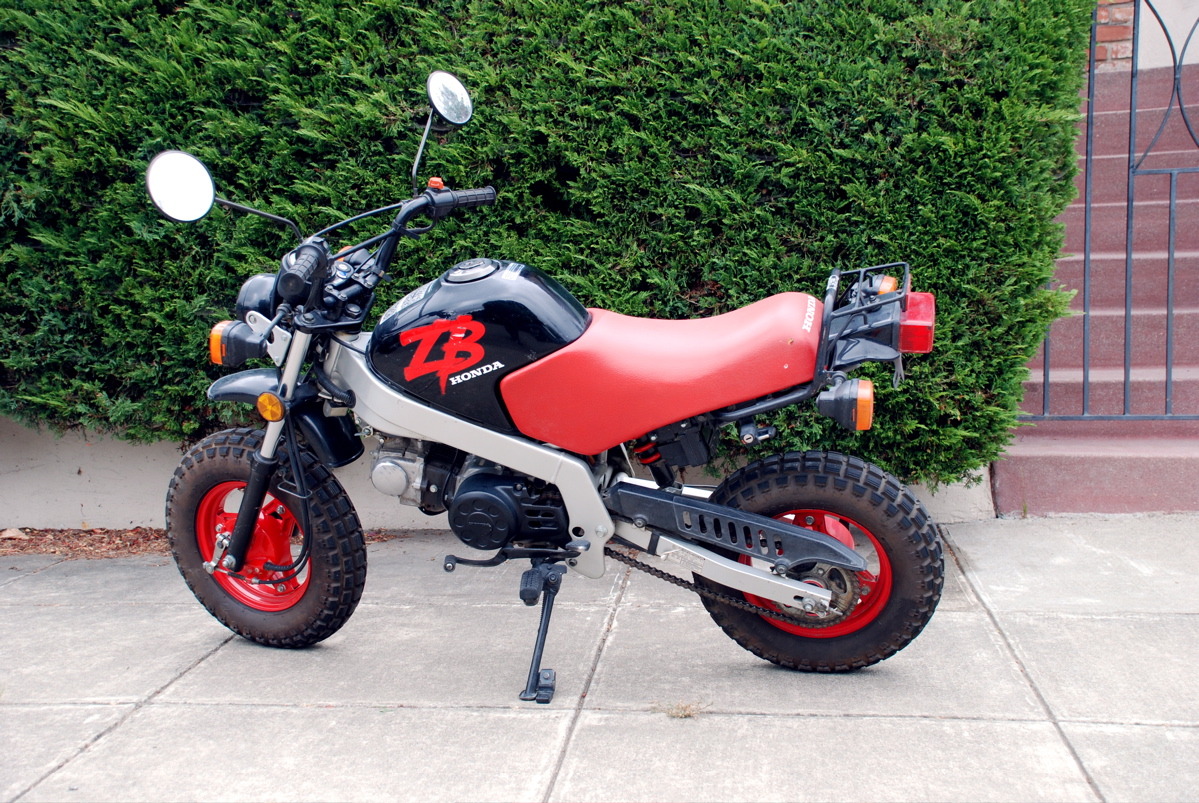
- Manufacturer: Honda
- Production: 1987–1988 (1988 U.S., Canada, Western-Europe)
- Class: Standard
- Engine: 49 cc (3.0 cu in), SOHC, 2-valve, four-stroke, air-cooled, single
- Power: 2.6 PS (1.9 kW; 2.6 hp)
- Transmission: 3-speed semi-automatic
- Suspension: Front: telescopic Rear: swingarm
- Brakes: Front: drum Rear: drum
- Tires: Front: 3.50-10 2PR; Rear: 3.50-10 2PR
- Rake, trail: Rake: 25 degrees Trail: 64 mm
- Wheelbase: 1,065 mm (41.9 in)
- Dimensions: L: 1,500 mm (59 in); W: 620 mm (24 in); H: 910 mm (36 in)
- Seat height: 660 mm (26 in)
- Weight: 71 kg (157 lb) (dry)
- Fuel capacity: 7 L (1.5 imp gal; 1.8 US gal)
- Related: Honda Z series

The ZB50 is a 50 cc (3.1 cu in) motorcycle produced by Honda belonging to its Z Series family of mini bikes. The ZB50 is very similar to the Monkey-R and Monkey-RT which were marketed only in Japan in 1987 and 1988.

The ZB50 was available in 1988 in the United States, Canada and western Europe. Only 3058 were produced for the US market as the bike proved too expensive to mass-produce. The ZB50 was offered as a street and trail alternative to the Z50R, which was geared more towards dirt-track riders. The ZB50 is characterized by a perimeter twin spar frame, giving it the appearance of a miniature sportbike.

== Specifications ==
Total length	1,500 mm (59 in)
Total width	620 mm (24 in)
Total height	910 mm (36 in)
Wheelbase	1,065 mm (41.9 in)
Dry Weight	71 kg (157 lb)
Engine type	Air-cooled 4-cycle SOHC single-cylinder
Displacement	49 cc (3.0 cu in)
Compression ratio	10.0:1
Bore x Stroke	39.0 mm x 41.4 mm
Max Power output	2.6 PS (2.6 hp)
Max Torque	4.7 N⋅m (3.5 ft⋅lbf) at 4500 rpm
Max speed	50 km/h (31 mph)
Carburetor type	Keihin PB 12, 13 mm piston-valve carburetor, with a butterfly style manual choke
Lubrication	Forced and wet sump
Fuel tank capacity	7 L (1.8 US gal)
Reserve capacity	1 L (0.26 US gal)
Load Capacity	74 kg (163 lb)
Clutch	Wet multi-plate, operated both by centrifugal action and by gear-lever.
Transmission type	3-speed
Gear ratios	1st: 3.272, 2nd: 1.823, 3rd: 1.190
Reduction gear ratio	Primary: 4.058, Secondary: 2.600
Starter	Kick
Ignition	Capacitor Discharge Ignition (CDI Magneto) system
Front Suspension	Telescopic Fork
Rear Suspension	Swing arm
Tire sizes (F/R)	3.50-10 2PR / 3.50-10 2PR
Front Brake	Drum, cable operated
Rear Brake	Drum, rod operated
Frame type	Twin spar perimeter

== Model information ==
The ZB50 is a street legal motorcycle, powered by a 4-stroke 49 cc overhead cam engine. Unlike the Z50R, the ZB50 engine features a roller bearing camshaft, an automatic cam chain tensioner, and a NGK CR6HS spark plug.^{[1]}

The electrical system is 12 volt and the ignition is a solid state electronic CDI.^{[1]}

The carburetor has stock settings of 1-3/4 turns out for the air screw, the jet needle is set at the 3rd groove from the top, the float level is 18 mm, and it has a #75 main jet.^{[1]}

The transmission is 3-speed constant mesh, with a 3-up shift pattern, it uses a wet multi-plate centrifugal clutch, with the following gear ratios: 1st 3.272, 2nd 1.823, and 3rd 1.190. It has a primary reduction ratio of: 4.058, and a secondary reduction ratio of 2.6 via the chain drive (15 tooth front sprocket and 39 tooth rear sprocket).^{[1]}

Canadian and U.S. versions differ by the speedometer units, where Canadian speedometers use metric units, and U.S. speedometers use English units ^{[1]} The Western-Europe versions differ, accordingly to the country they are meant for with -headlight -headlight brackets -fenders -tail -plateholder(Netherlands)
