= Honda Z50M =

Z50M
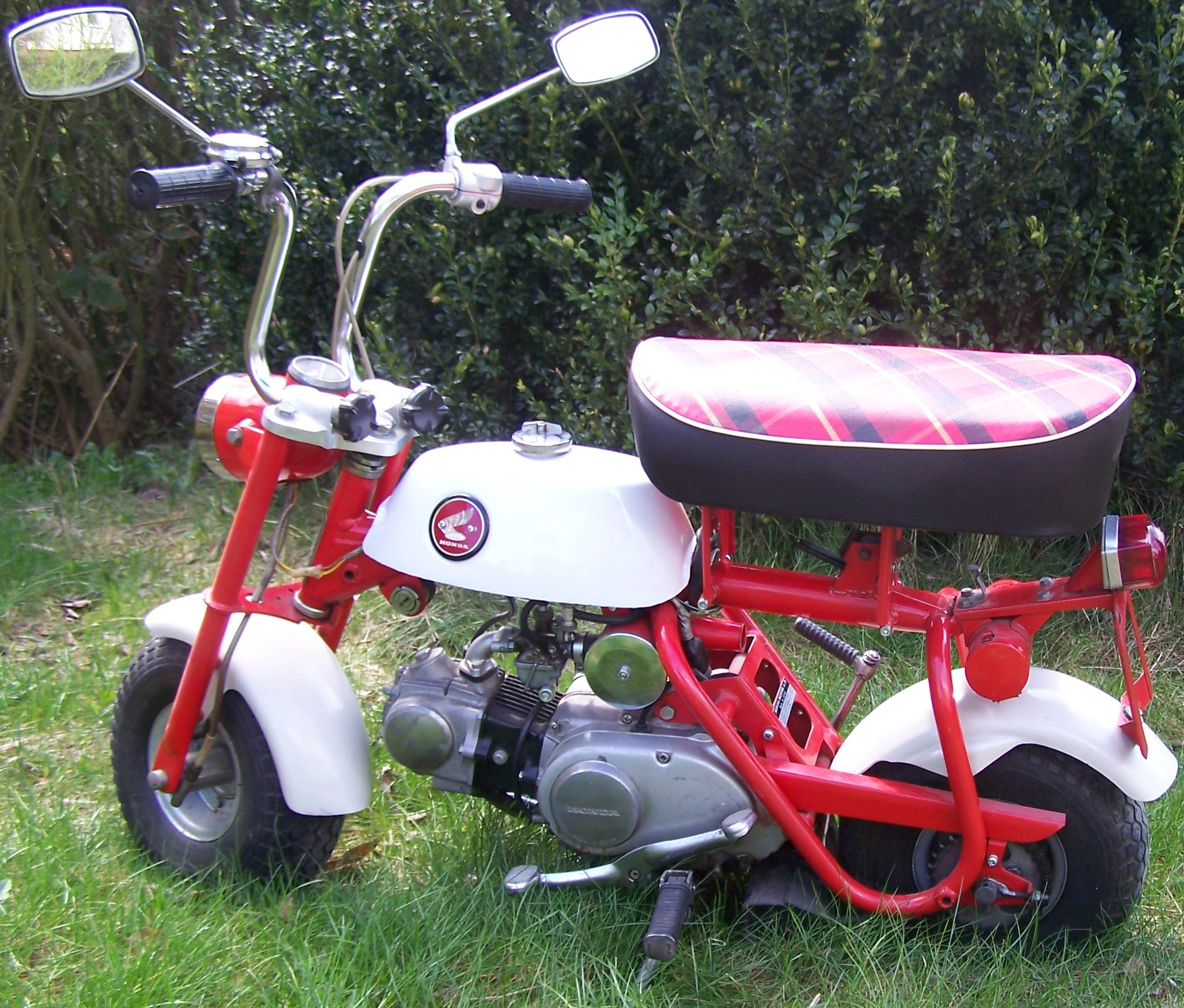
- Honda Z50M
- Manufacturer: Honda
- Production: 1967–1969
- Predecessor: Honda CZ100
- Successor: Honda Z50A
- Class: Minibike
- Engine: 49 cc (3.0 cu in), air-cooled, four-stroke, single
- Related: Honda Z100 *Honda Z series, *Honda Z50A, *Honda Z50R, *Honda Z50J

The Honda Z50M was the first Z50 Series of mini bikes produced by Honda. It was first made in late 1966 and released for sale in 1967 to the European, Australian and Canadian markets.

== History ==
The Z50M was fully equipped with headlight, taillight, rear brake light, and horn and mirror and was able to be registered for road use in most countries. In Japan most were used on the road. In other countries many were used by children just for fun off-road and sustained damaged frames. Though these bikes are not extinct today, these mini bikes are some of the least common of the Z50 series left running. The model has three basic sub models, the General Export (G.E.) small headlight, low exhaust supplied to Australia UK and Canada, Japanese domestic model (JDM), small headlight and high 'lunch box' exhaust and the French model's larger 5-inch headlight fitted with a yellow bulb. Most of the first ones went to France and an early prototype with chromed fenders is shown on the Honda Brochures of the time. Last production was 1969 and these were still available in Australia into 1970 alongside The Z50A K1 G.E.

== See also ==
- List of scooter manufacturers
- Minibike
- Pocketbike
- Pit bike
- Types of motorcycles
