= Mini chopper =

Scaled-down versions of custom-built motorcycles

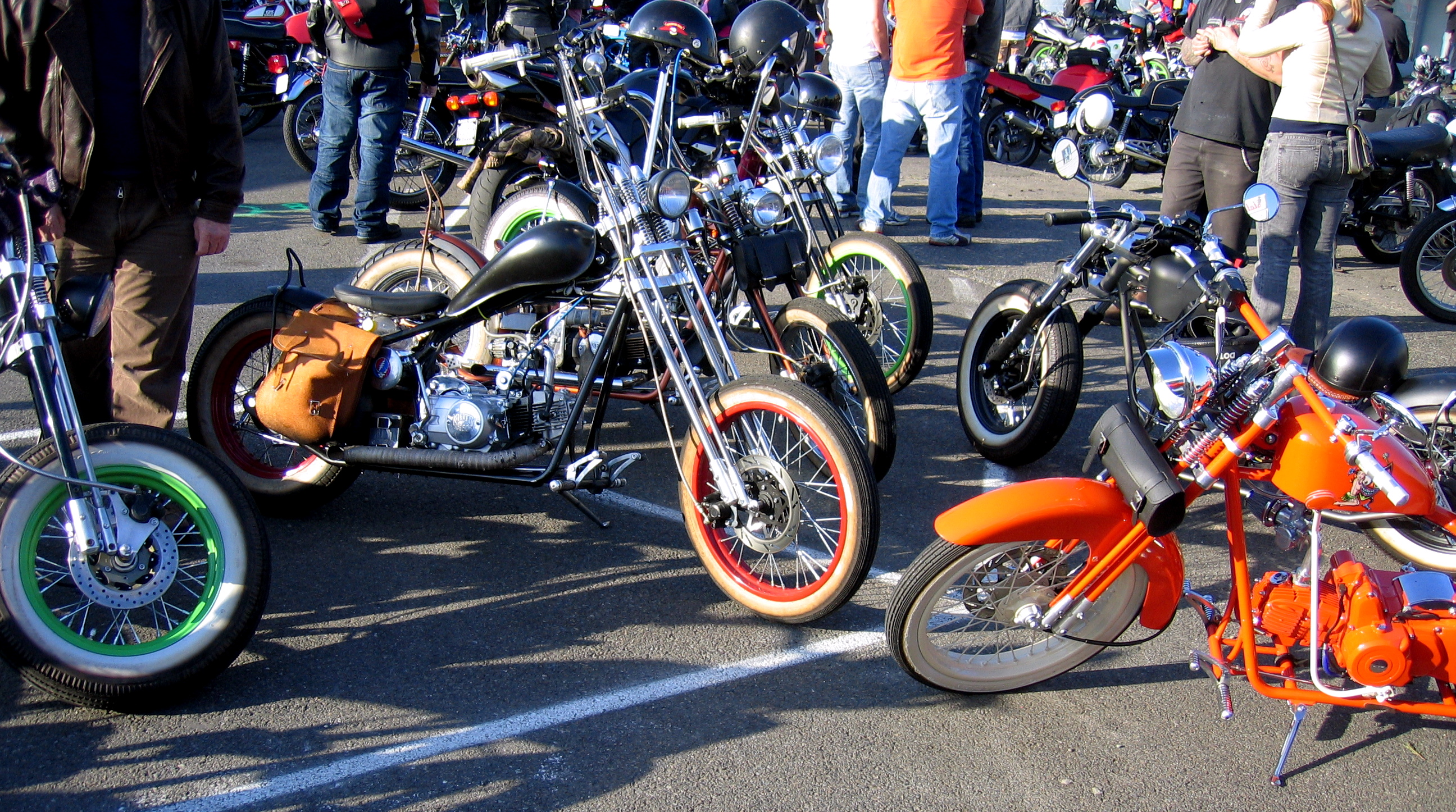
Mini choppers in Ballard, Seattle, Washington, May 20, 2009.

Mini Choppers are scaled-down versions of custom-built motorcycles known as choppers. Commercially available Mini Choppers are available from various retailers, some utilizing similar production methods to Minibikes, while others use Scooter, Moped sourced parts/engines. Custom Mini Choppers are generally constructed from 1" steel tubing or 3/4" steel black pipe. The tube or pipe is bent and then welded together to get the desired angles and shapes of the frame.

Mini choppers use a variety of engines. One of the most popular is a Base 50 engine, a generic term for Imported single cylinder horizontal 50cc to 140cc 4-stroke engines derived from Honda's line of small motorcycle engines. 50cc (actually 49.5cc) engines offer the advantage of being classified as a Moped or Scooter engine, and many municlities do not require a specific motorcycle license to operate a vehicles with engines sizes of less than 50cc. Larger, vertical engines up to 250cc, developed for the ATV and motorcycle market are also used. These engines are Unit construction, allowing for traditional multi-speed transmissions, and may feature either a semi-auto or fully manual transmission. Before the prevalence of inexpensive Chinese engines, industrial Briggs & Stratton or Tecumseh horizontal engines with Centrifugal clutches or Continuously Variable Transmission were more commonly used to transmit power to the rear wheel. This was similar to Minibikes or Go-karts, and were often not street legal without modification, due to emissions.

Mini Choppers often use bicycle, moped or small motorcycle wheels with pneumatic tires. Typical sizes range from 6" to 12". Full-size motorcycle wheels and tires are also used, but generally require larger engines to have the power to function adequately. To operate on the road, Mini Choppers will require necessary lighting and brakes to be street legal.

== Legality ==
In the US Mini choppers are not legal in all states. In Pennsylvania, a vehicle with 1.6 to 5 horsepower is a motor-driven cycle; while anything exceeding 5 horsepower is defined as a motorcycle. Both require inspections and adhesion to DOT laws. Vehicles that are built with engines of less than 50cc, 1.6 hp and do not exceed 25 mph do not require an inspection. When you purchase a kit, or retail Mini Chopper intended for street use, it should be accompanied by a title, or a Manufactures Statement of Origin (MSO). If you custom build a mini chopper, you will need to adhere to local laws regarding acquiring a title.

== See also ==
- All-terrain vehicle
- Honda Z series - also known as a Monkey bike.
- Minibike
- Pit bike
- Pocketbike
