= Navy (disambiguation) =

A navy is a maritime fleet.

Navy may also refer to:

== Maritime forces ==
=== Commercial fleet ===
- Merchant navy, a commercial maritime fleet

=== Fighting forces ===
- Argentine Navy
- Chilean Navy
- Chinese Navy (disambiguation)
- Croatian Navy
- French Navy
- German Navy
- Hellenic Navy
- Israeli Navy
- Marina Militare (Modern Italian Navy)
- North Korean Navy
- Peruvian Navy
- Portuguese Navy
- Regia Marina (Italian Navy until 1946)
- Royal Australian Navy
- Royal Canadian Navy
- Royal Navy (United Kingdom Navy)
- Royal Netherlands Navy
- Russian Navy
- South Korean Navy
- Spanish Navy
- Taiwan Navy
- Turkish Navy
- Ukrainian Navy
- United States Navy

== Arts, entertainment, and media ==
- The Navy (London), published by the Navy League of Great Britain
- The Navy (Washington), published by the United States Navy
- The Navy (film), a 1930 film

== Other uses ==
- Navy blue, a color
- Indigo (color)
- Navy Midshipmen, the intercollegiate athletic program of the U.S. Naval Academy
- Navy Pier, a large pier in Chicago
- United States Naval Academy, in intercollegiate athletics and academics
- Navy (perfume)

== See also ==
- Naval (disambiguation)
- Navi (disambiguation)
- Navvy
