= Monster Moto =

- Founded: 2013
- Headquarters: Ruston, Louisiana, U.S.
- Key people: David Rossi (CEO); Rick Sukkar (COO)
- Website: MonsterMoto.com

Monster Moto is an American manufacturer of mini bikes and go-karts for children. Monster Moto's CEO is David Rossi and Jim Sholtis is the COO. Catalyst Holdings, a Dallas-based private equity firm, formed the company in September 2013.

== Headquarters ==
The company moved its Texas-based headquarters and assembly line (originally held in China) to Ruston, Louisiana in June 2016. The then Governor of Louisiana, Bobby Jindal, attended the announcement of the move and building of the new plant.

The company received the 2016 Corporate Investment & Community Impact (CiCi) Award from Trade & Development for the economic impact in relocating their headquarters and assembly line.

In August 2018 the company announced that production and assembly would move back to China for significant cost savings. The Ruston plant is scheduled to be shut down later in 2018. Management of the sales team would move to the Dallas, TX office.
