= Honda Ape =

Minibike sold in Japan

The Honda Ape is a minibike sold in the Japanese market. While technically classed as a minibike due to its small frame and 50 cc or 100 cc engines, its height makes it rideable for an adult. The Ape features four-stroke engines, and five-speed transmissions.

It is sometimes classed as a monkey bike alongside the Honda Monkey and Honda Gorilla.

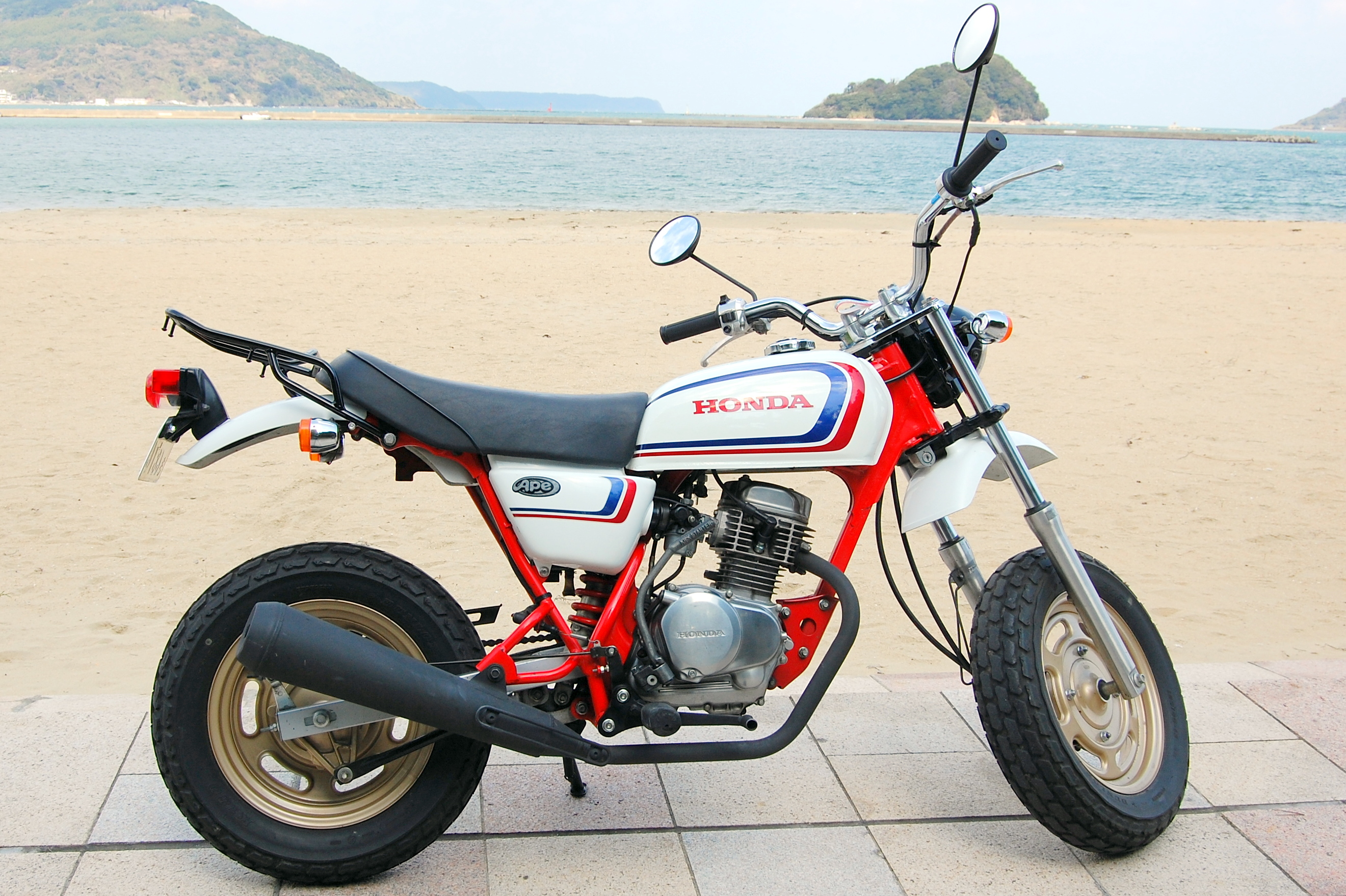
Honda Ape 50cc 2006
