= Navi =

Navi may refer to:

== People ==
- Navi (impersonator) (fl. from 1988), Michael Jackson tribute artist
- Navi (born 1980), member of the Japanese musical group GReeeeN
- Navi Pillay (born 1941), South African lawyer and former UN High Commissioner for Human Rights
- Navi Radjou (born 1970), executive director of the Centre for India and Global Business
- Navi Rawat (born 1977), American actress

== Places ==
- Navi, Estonia
- Navi Mumbai, Maharashtra, India
- Perini Navi, a shipyard in Italy

== Film and television ==
- Na'vi, a humanoid alien race in the 2009 film Avatar
  - Na'vi language
- Navi Araz, a villain in the television series 24
- Navi (Kaizoku Sentai Gokaiger), a robotic bird from a Japanese tokusatsu drama
- "NAVI", the term for computers in the Japanese animation Serial Experiments Lain

== Video games ==
- Navi (The Legend of Zelda), a video game character
- Natus Vincere, or "NAVI", a Ukrainian esports organization

== Other ==
- NAVI (band), a Belarusian folk-pop duo
- Navi Group, Indian financial services firm
- Navient (NASDAQ: NAVI), an American student debt collection service
- Neighborhood Autonomous Vehicle Innovation, an autonomous shuttle service in Jacksonville, Florida
- Honda NAVi, a compact motorcycle manufactured from 2022
- Navi, an alternate name for the star Gamma Cassiopeiae
- Navi, the GPU architecture featured in AMD's Radeon RX 5000 series
- Navi, a character in the Japanese light novel series Dragonar Academy
- Short term for navigation and navigator
- Navi-Key, a control introduced in the Nokia 3110 cell phone product line
- Navi, singular of Nevi'im, a class of prophets in the Hebrew Bible
- Navi, a word used for computers in the anime Serial Experiments Lain

== See also ==
- Navvy, a canal worker
- Navy (disambiguation)
- Nhavi, village in Maharashtra, India
