= Suzuki PV 50 =

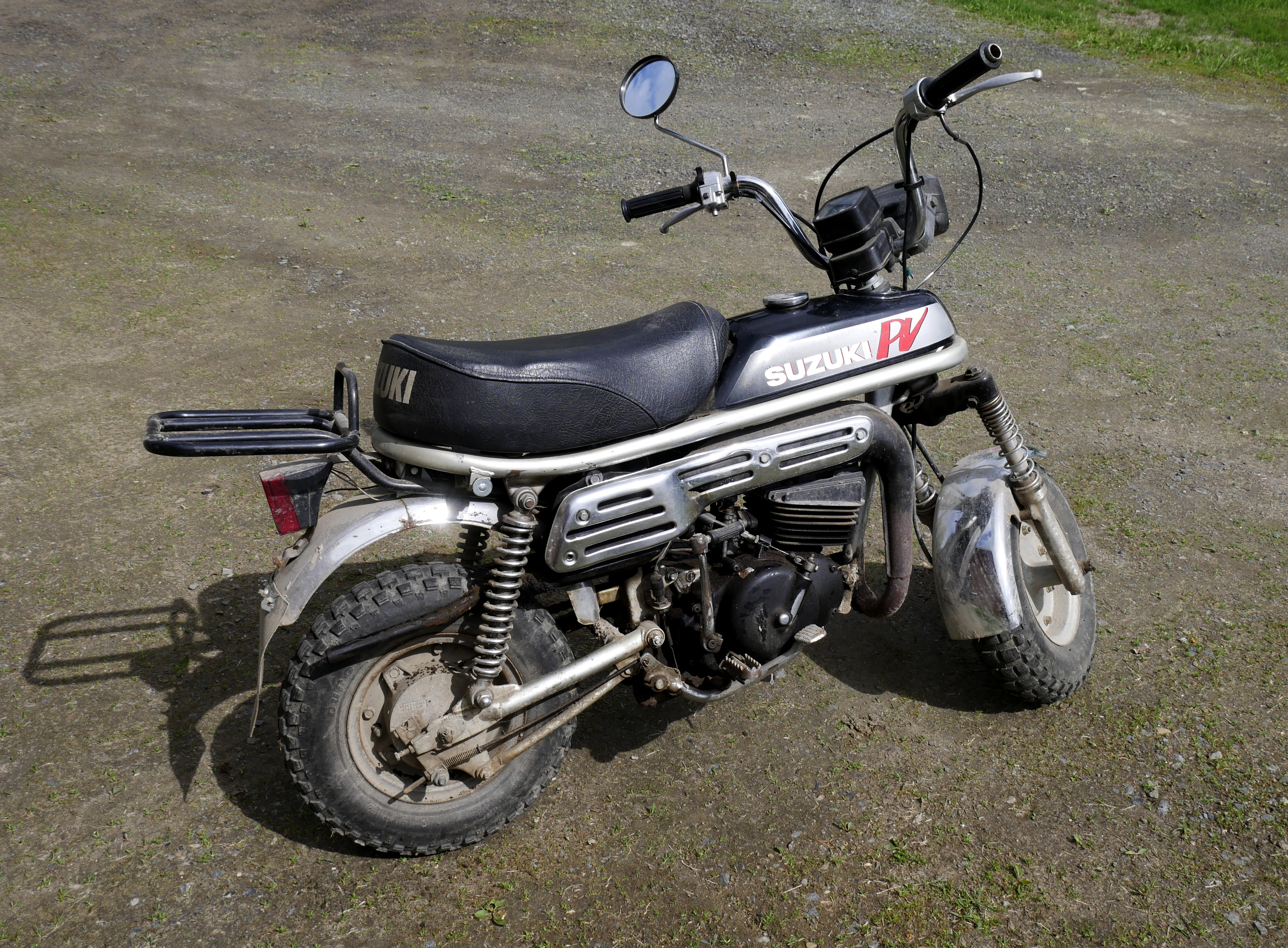
- A PV 50 from 1990
- Manufacturer: Suzuki
- Production: 1981–2000
- Class: Minibike
- Engine: 50 cc (3.1 cu in), air cooled, single
- Ignition type: Kick start
- Transmission: 4-speed manual
- Frame type: Tube frame
- Brakes: Drum brakes
- Tires: Nokian Tyres Finnspeed 3.50-8
- Dimensions: L: 1,415 mm (55.7 in); W: 685 mm (27.0 in)
- Seat height: 650 mm (26 in)
- Weight: 60 kg (130 lb) (dry)
- Fuel capacity: 2.5, 3.4 or 3.5 L (0.55, 0.75 or 0.77 imp gal; 0.66, 0.90 or 0.92 US gal) (depends on year of make)

The Suzuki PV 50 is a minibike that was produced from 1979 to 2000 in Japan, with importation to Finland and some sold in Sweden. It is equipped with an air-cooled 50cc 2-stroke engine, drum brakes, kick start, and a 4-speed manual transmission. This bike is known for its tuning capabilities, such as cylinder enlargement and porting. The stock specs vary by model year, with the earlier models (1979–1993) featuring a reedless cylinder and Mikuni VM12SH carburetor, and later models (1993–2000) featuring a reed valve cylinder and Mikuni VM14SH carburetor.

The Honda Monkey and Suzuki PV 50 were the most iconic rival mopeds among Finnish youth from the 1970s to the 2000s, giving rise to their own unique subculture. The Suzuki PV 50 is featured in the game My Summer Car as the "Jonnez ES" (a reference to the ES-jonne Internet meme), which is set in Finland. The Suzuki PV 50 has a considerable tuning culture in Finland, with some 80cc kits pushing 100 kilometers per hour.

== Specifications ==
Engine specifications

- Engine: Air cooled 50 cc (3.1 cu in) two-stroke engine
- Top speed: 40.2 km/h (25.0 mph)
- Cylinder width: 41 mm (1.6 in)
- Stroke: 37.8 mm (1.49 in)
- Compression ratio: 6.2:1
- Power: 1.5 hp
- Carburetor: Mikuni VM12SH till 1993 and Mikuni VM14SH from 1994
- Main jet: 57.5
- Oil mix: 3%
- Fuel tank: 3.5 liters (0.77 imp gal; 0.92 U.S. gal)
- Clutch: 3 disc wet clutch
- Transmission: 4-speed manual (1-N-2-3-4)
- Drivetrain type: Chain
- Gear ratio: 11.2 (Front sprocket 13, rear sprocket 35)
- Ignition: (81-82 tips) and (83-00 tipless CDI)
- Ignition plug: NGK BP-6ES
- Ignition plug gap: 0.7
- Ignition system voltage: 6V
- Tires: Front: 3.50*8, 1.7 bar. Rear: 3.50*8, 1.9 bar

== See also ==
- Honda Z series
