= Honda Z100 =

Honda's 1961 prototype minibike

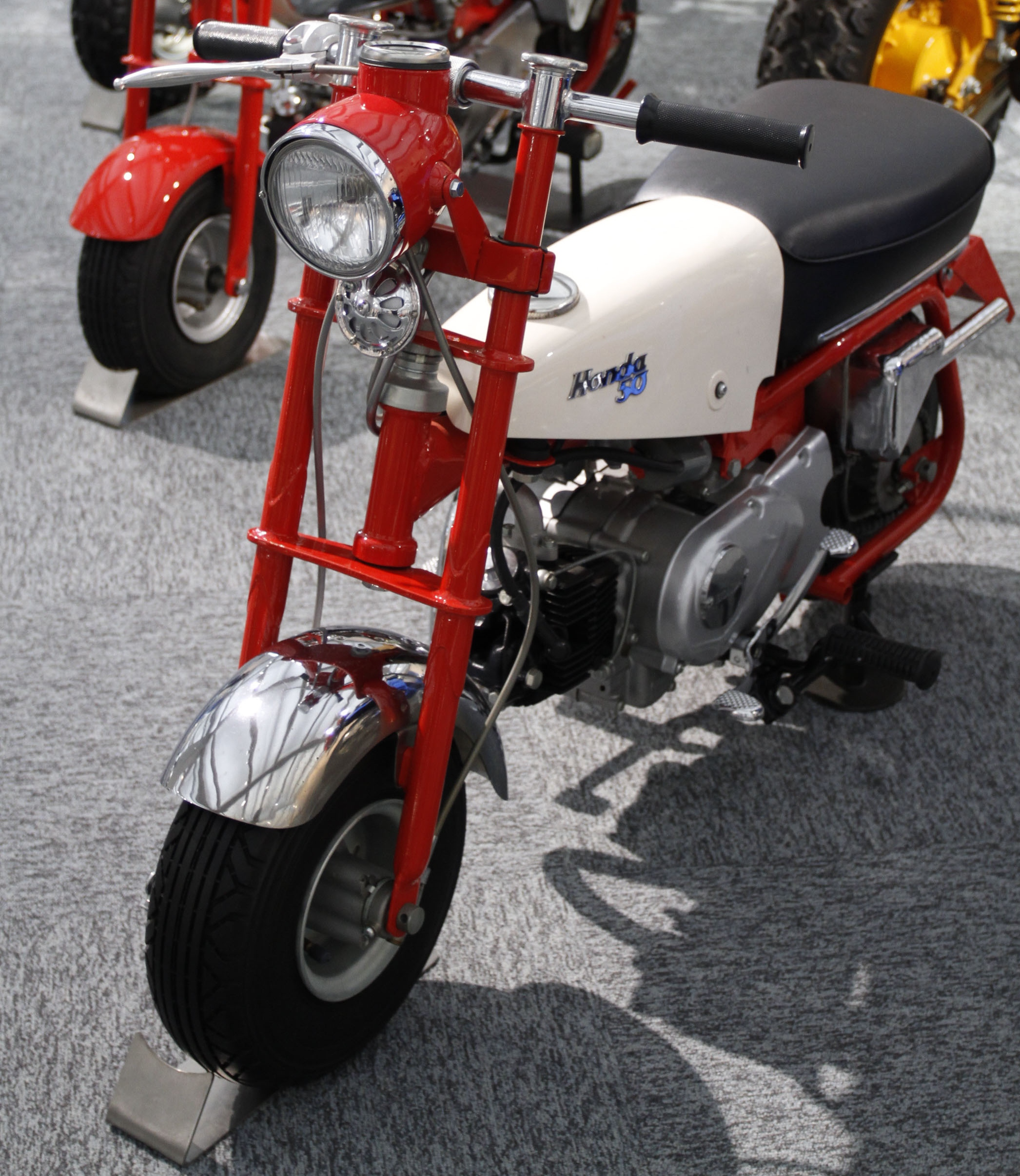
- 1961 Z100
- Manufacturer: Honda
- Also called: Monkey Bike
- Production: 1961
- Successor: Honda CZ100
- Class: Minibike
- Engine: 49 cc (3.0 cu in), OHV, air cooled, four stroke, single
- Transmission: 3-speed semi-automatic transmission
- Frame type: Backbone
- Brakes: Drum
- Tires: 5"
- Related: Honda CZ100; Honda Z series; Honda Z50M; Honda Z50A; Honda Z50J

The Honda Z100 is a Honda Motor Company minibike which was introduced at the Tama Tech amusement Park in Tokyo, Japan in 1961. The Z100 minibike was never meant to be produced and sold to consumers. The success of the Z100 prototype convinced Honda to produce and sell the minibike to consumers.

== Background ==
The Tama Tech park opened in 1961 and was owned by the Honda Motor Company. The park attractions involved many different motorsports. Honda developed the Z100 minibike for the park, it was never meant to be a product for consumers.

Honda had built a new Suzuka Circuit so that park goers could experience the joys of driving. The minibike was meant to be ridden around the Tama Tech park. Honda took note of the fact that it became the park's most popular attraction.

== History ==
The minibike was not a production motorcycle, so the engine in the Z100 was repurposed from the Honda Super Cub. The 1961 Super Cub engine which was used in the Z100 was a 49 cc. The Z100 had small 5" wheels and the minibike had a white fuel tank and a bright red frame.

The bike was intentionally built small to accommodate children, but it also appealed to adults who rode them around the circuit. The bike soon came to be known as a monkey bike because most adult people, looked large in relation to the very small motorcycle. Onlookers described riders as looking like a Monkey on the bike.

Honda recognized the popularity of the minibike and they decided to manufacture a street-legal version of the bike. In 1963, they released the bike in the Japanese market and called it the CZ100. The Z100 proved to be so popular that it was introduced to the European market as the CZ100 in 1964.

== Legacy ==
The minibike was the precursor to all of the other versions of minibikes produced by Honda. The Z100 proved the minibike concept could be successful as a niche product and it led many years of Honda minibike production. The little bikes were all powered by the same 50cc engine with a 3 speed transmission. The Z series Honda Minibikes that followed had folding handlebars so that users could stow them in the trunk of their cars.

== See also ==
- List of scooter manufacturers
- Minibike
- Pocketbike
- Pit bike
