= Honda Z50A =

Z50A
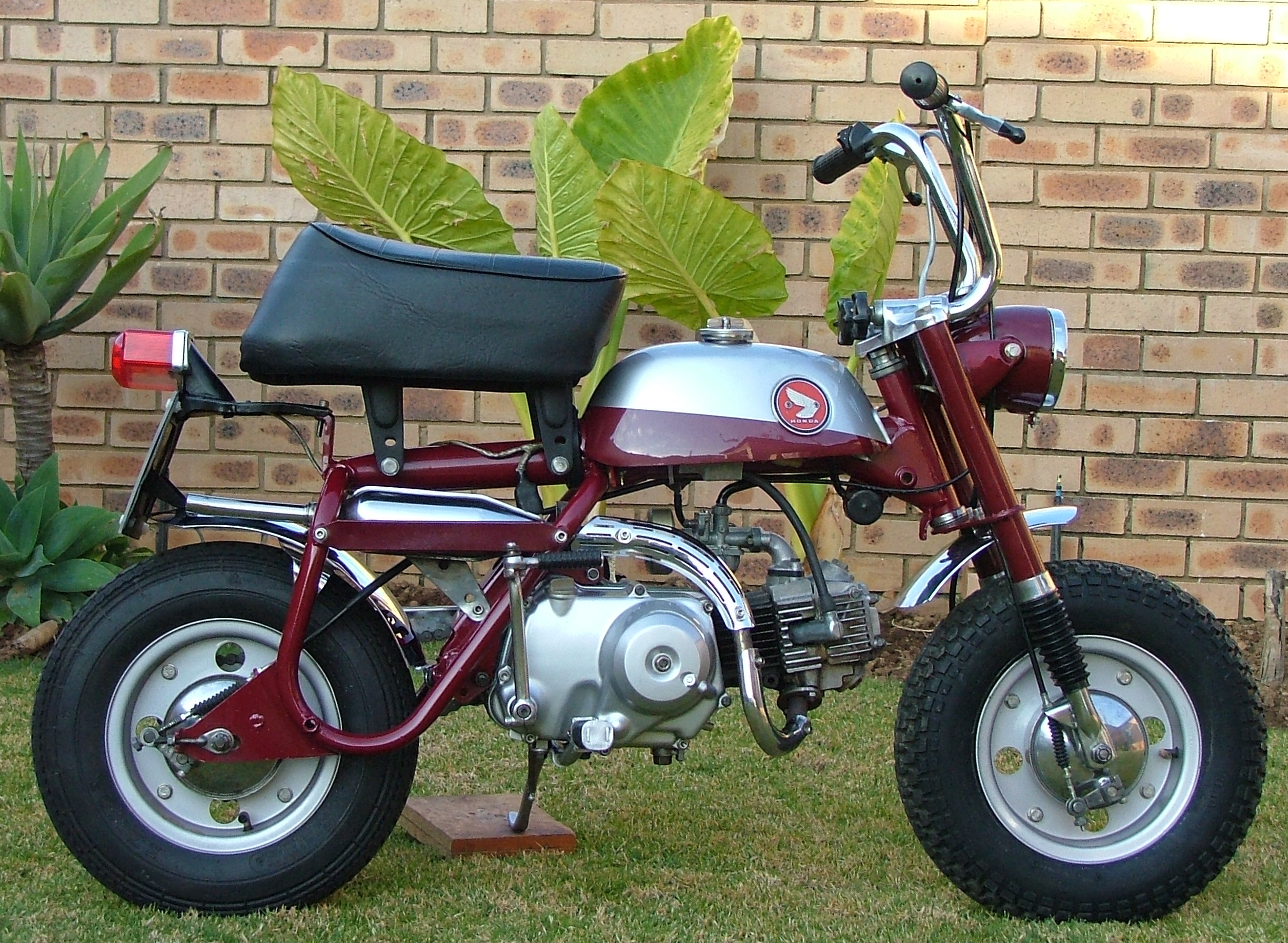
- Honda Z50A-K1
- Manufacturer: Honda
- Production: 1968–1978 (US); 1969–1973 (Europe & Japan)
- Predecessor: Honda Z50M
- Successor: Honda Z50J (Europe & Japan); Honda Z50R (US)
- Class: Minibike
- Engine: 49 cc (3.0 cu in), air-cooled, four-stroke, single
- Transmission: 3-speed semi-automatic
- Frame type: Backbone
- Related: Honda Z100 *Honda CZ100 *Honda Z series, *Honda Z50M, *Honda Z50R, *Honda Z50J

The Z50A is a small motorcycle with a 49 cc (3.0 cu in) single-cylinder four-stroke overhead cam engine and a semi-automatic transmission. It was made by Honda from 1968 to 1978 and it was the second generation of the Z50 series of minibikes.

== Z50A designs ==
The 1968–1971 Z50As were known as the "Hard Tail" because of their lack of rear shock absorbers. 1968 was also called a K0, a 1969-1970 is called a K1 and a 1970-71 are referred to as K2s. Rear shock absorbers were added to the Z50A in 1972 and it was referred to as a K3.

== History ==
The 1968 sometimes referred to as the "High Bar" or the "Slantguard", was the first of the Z50 series to be released to the American market. The bikes had white handgrips and 8 inch wheels. They came in with a two tone paint job.

In 1969, Honda released the K1 which added street legal lighting. Lower handlebars were fitted on the 1969/1970 K1 "short tail" as well as a license plate mount.

In 1972, after frame cracking became a growing issue, Honda incorporated rear suspension on the bike. The Z50A "Soft Tail" remained on the American market until after model year 1978, when it was replaced by the Z50R. In Europe and Japan, the Z50A was renamed the Z50J in 1973, and remained on the market until 1999.

== See also ==
- List of scooter manufacturers
- Minibike
- Pocketbike
- Pit bike
- Types of motorcycles
