= Honda Navi =

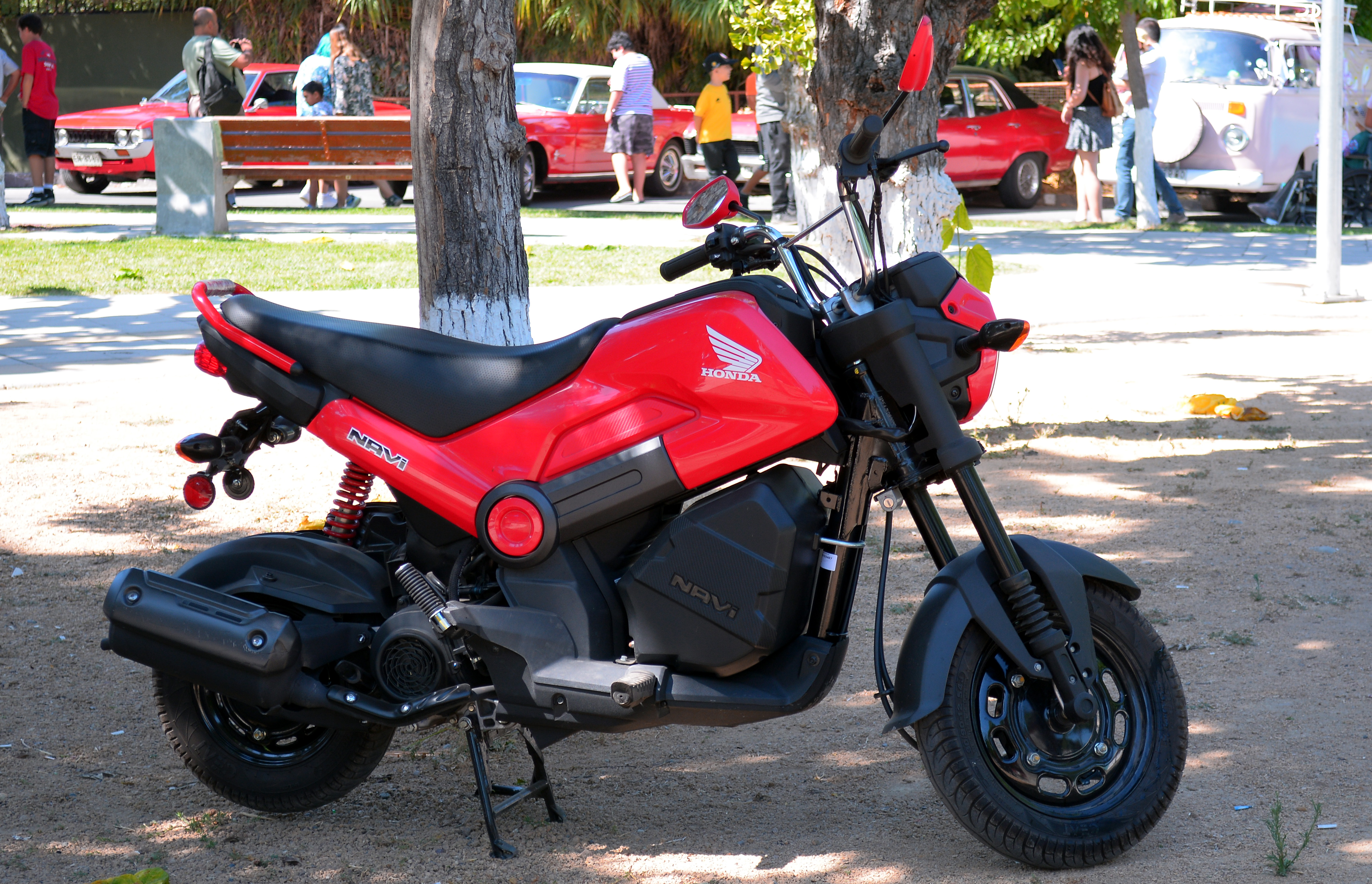
- Manufacturer: Honda
- Production: 2016–2020, 2022–present
- Assembly: India; Mexico
- Class: Standard
- Engine: 109 cc (6.7 cu in), air-cooled, four-stroke single
- Bore / stroke: 50 mm × 55.6 mm (1.97 in × 2.19 in)
- Compression ratio: 9.5:1
- Ignition type: Both electric- and kick- start
- Fuel delivery: 16 mm carburetor
- Transmission: V-matic continuously variable transmission
- Suspension: Front: 27 mm inverted fork, 3.5" travel Rear: Single shock, 2.8" travel
- Brakes: Linked 130 mm drum brakes
- Tires: Front: 90/90-12; Rear: 90/100-10
- Rake, trail: 27.5°, 79 mm (3.1 in)
- Wheelbase: 1,290 mm (50.6 in)
- Seat height: 760 mm (30.0 in)
- Weight: 106 kg (234 lb) (claimed) (wet)
- Fuel capacity: 3.4 L; 0.75 imp gal (0.9 US gal)
- Fuel consumption: 2.1 L/100 km; 130 mpg_{‑imp} (110 mpg_{‑US}) (claimed)

The Honda Navi (often stylized as NAVi) is a compact automatic motorcycle produced by Honda as part of the miniMoto range of small, sub-125cc machines.

Lending to its simple design, mechanisms, and construction, the Navi is one of the lowest-priced in the range. It uses a 16 mm carburetor to fuel a 109cc air-cooled, four-stroke, 2-valve OHC single-cylinder engine. A luggage box is positioned below the fuel tank between the swingarm-mounted engine and the frame.

== See also ==
- Honda MSX125 Grom
- Honda Monkey
