= Naval (disambiguation) =

Naval is a term relating to a navy (a military branch that primarily uses ships and/or boats).

Naval can also refer to:

- Naval, Biliran, a municipality in the Philippines
- Naval, Huesca, a municipality in Spain
- Deepti Naval (born 1957), Indian actress
- Naval de Talcahuano, a defunct Chilean football team that was based in the city of Talcahuano
- Naval 1º de Maio, a sports club in Figueira da Foz, Portugal
- Naval Ravikant, Indian American entrepreneur

== See also ==
- Navy (disambiguation)
- Navel, or belly button
