= Honda Grom =

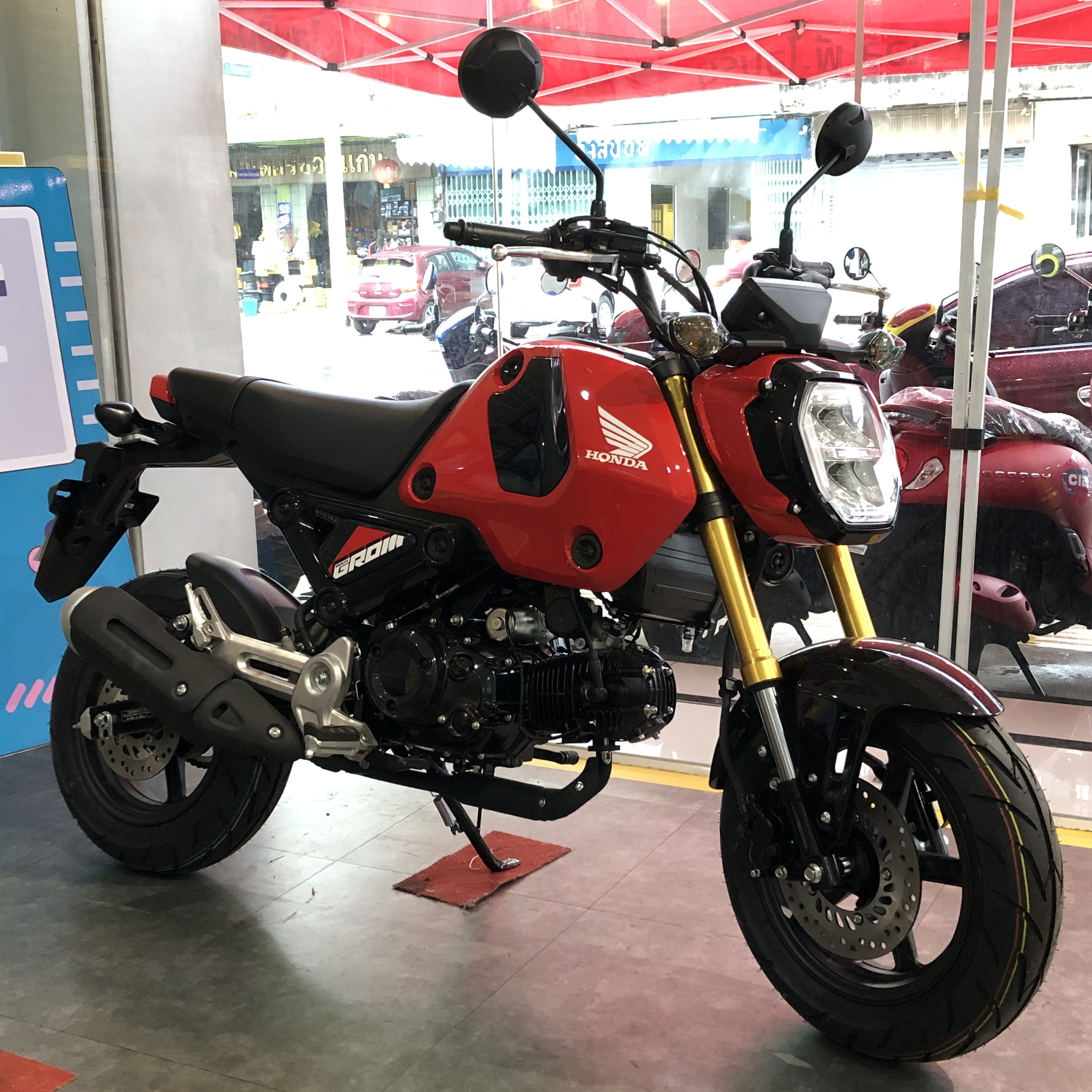
- 2022 Honda Grom
- Manufacturer: Honda
- Also called: Honda MSX125
- Production: 2014–present
- Assembly: Thailand
- Class: Standard
- Engine: 124.9 cc (7.62 cu in), air-cooled, four-stroke, single
- Bore / stroke: 52.40 mm × 57.90 mm (2.063 in × 2.2795 in)
- Top speed: 55–73 mph (89–117 km/h).
- Transmission: 4-speed manual (2014–2021); 5-speed manual (2022–)
- Suspension: 31 mm inverted fork; 3.9" travel (front); Single shock with steel box-section swingarm; 4.1" travel (rear)
- Brakes: Single disc with hydraulic dual-piston caliper, 220 mm (front) & 190 mm (rear)
- Tires: 120/70-12 (front); 130/70-12 (rear)
- Rake, trail: 25°, 81 mm
- Wheelbase: 1,200 mm (47.2 in)
- Seat height: 750 mm (29.7 in)
- Fuel capacity: 5.5 L; 1.21 imp gal (1.45 US gal)
- Related: Honda Wave

The Honda Grom (Honda MSX125 in Europe and East Asia) is a compact 124.9 cc (7.62 cu in) air-cooled standard motorcycle manufactured by Honda. It won the 2014 Motorcycle USA "Motorcycle of the Year" prize. The Honda Grom can achieve a fuel economy of 134 mpg_{‑US} (1.76 L/100 km; 161 mpg_{‑imp}), a power output of 10 hp (7.5 kW) at 7,000 rpm, and a top speed of 55–73 mph (89–117 km/h).

It is part of Honda's miniMOTO line up of "pocket-sized" motorcycles. Other motorcycles in the range include the Honda Monkey 125, Honda Super Cub C125, Honda Trail 125, and Honda Navi.
