= The Navy (Washington) =

Former magazine published by United States Navy (1907–1916)

The Navy was a magazine published by the United States Navy from 1907 to 1916. Some volumes are available online through Google Books.
