= Chinese Navy (disambiguation) =

Two modern navies have been known in English as the Chinese Navy:

- People's Liberation Army Navy
- Republic of China Navy

For Chinese navies before 1912, see:

- Imperial Chinese Navy
- Naval history of China
