= Tama Tech =

Former Japanese amusement park

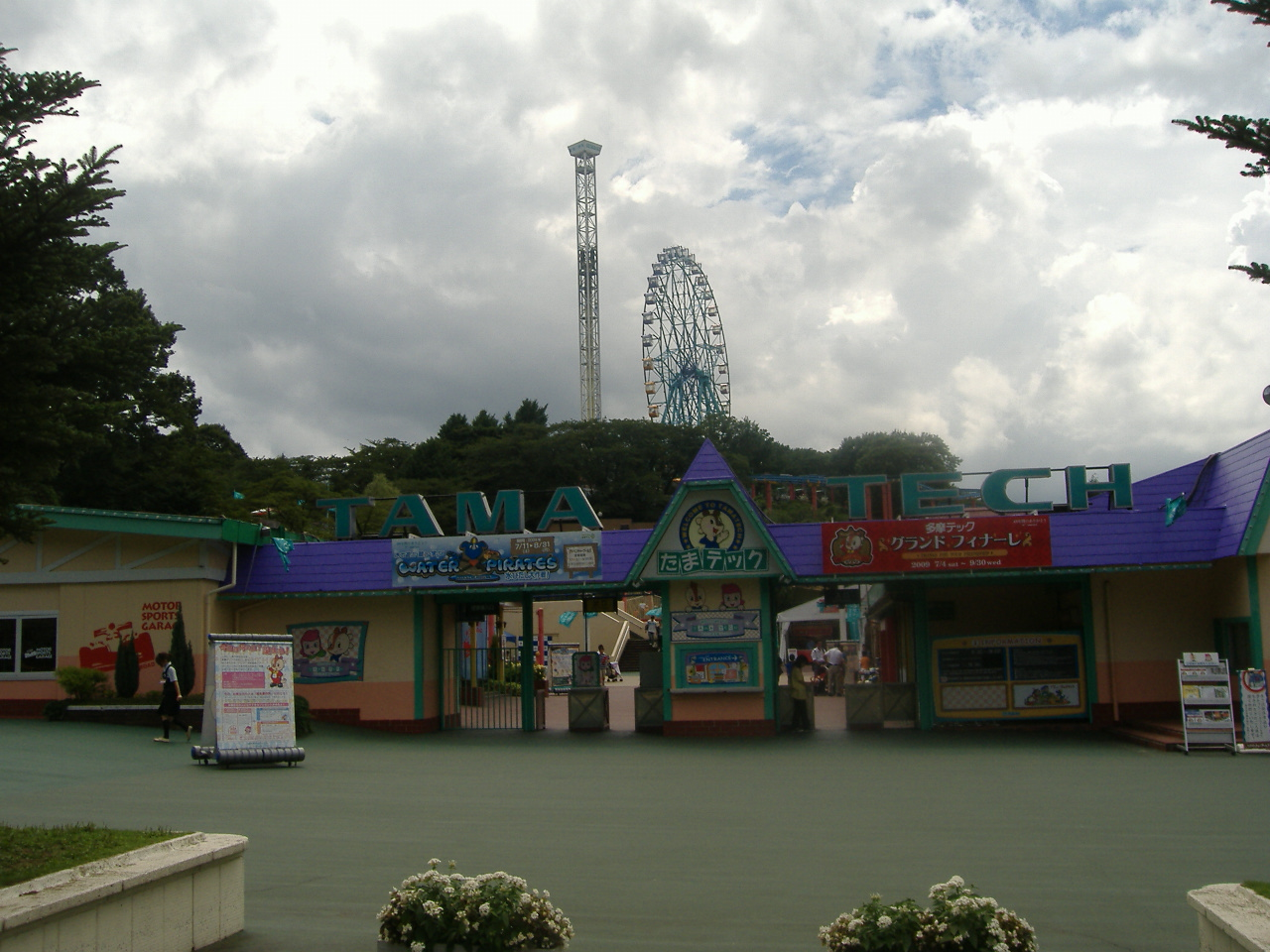
- The park entrance in 2009
- Interactive map of Tama Tech
- Location: Hino, Tokyo, Japan
- Coordinates: 35.641917°N 139.391313°E
- Status: Defunct
- Opened: October 1, 1961
- Closed: September 30, 2009
- Owner: Honda
- Operated by: Honda Mobilityland

Attractions
- Total: Vehicles
- Roller coasters: Yes
- Website: Official website (defunct)

Tama Tech was an amusement park that operated in Hino, Tokyo, Japan from 1961 to 2009. It closed permanently on September 30, 2009.

== History ==
The park opened in 1961 and was owned by the Honda Motor Company. The park attractions involved motorsports. The park featured a variety of mechanized vehicles which visitors could try out.

In addition to Honda vehicles and electric vehicles, park visitors also could ride a roller coaster and a Ferris wheel. In the winter months park goers could also ice skate.

Occasionally Honda introduced a product at the park which made it to mass production. In the case of the Honda Z100 minibike, Honda began to mass-produce the bike after seeing its success at the park. The descendant of the minibike was the Honda CZ100, and it was introduced to the European market in 1964.

== See also ==
- Suzuka Circuit
- Twin Ring Motegi
