= Honda Z50J =

The Z50J (early versions, 1972–1978, sometimes referred to as Z50J1) is a motorcycle produced by Honda belonging to its Honda Z series family of mini bikes. The j-series came after the m-series (1966–1969) but the very first Honda Monkey was the Z100 from 1961 made for the amusement park Tama Tech in Tokyo Japan. It was followed by the commercial version CZ100 in 1964.

The Z50J (J1) began production in 1973 and those were sold as 1974 models for the European and Japanese markets. In its first few years of production, it was mostly the same as its American counterpart, the Honda Z50A produced since 1972.

But in 1978, when Honda dropped the Z50A from its American motorcycle lineup, the European Z50 continued to evolve with a new drop-shaped tank and bicycle style seat, often referred to as the Z50J2. It was produced until 1999.

Fewer Z50J2 were being produced each year and were finally sold only as limited editions. Finland had its own edition of the Z50J2 through the 1980s to 1999 since it was registered as a moped in Finland and not a motorcycle. 1987-99 Finnish models used non-foldable "BMX" style handlebars; they did not come with indicators, had 6 volt lighting, and most were black and red in colour.

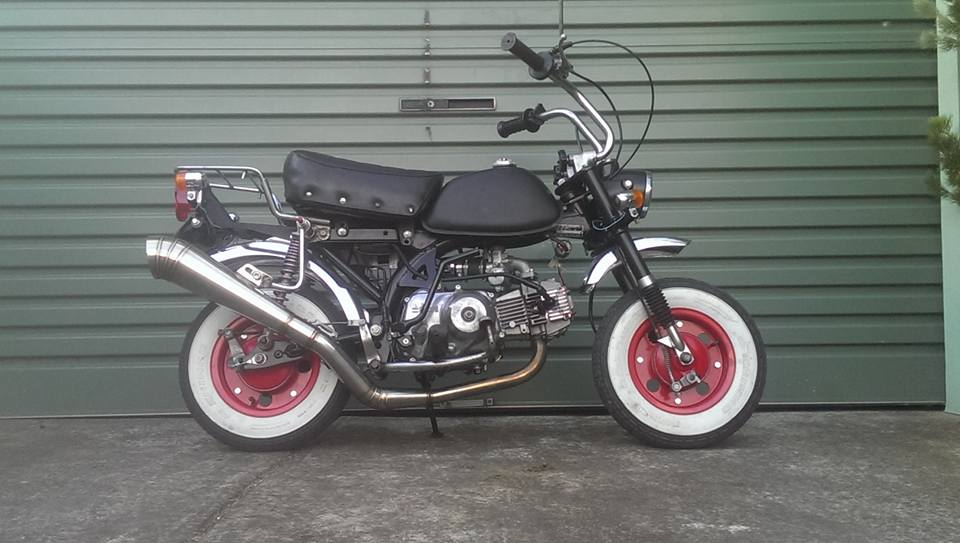

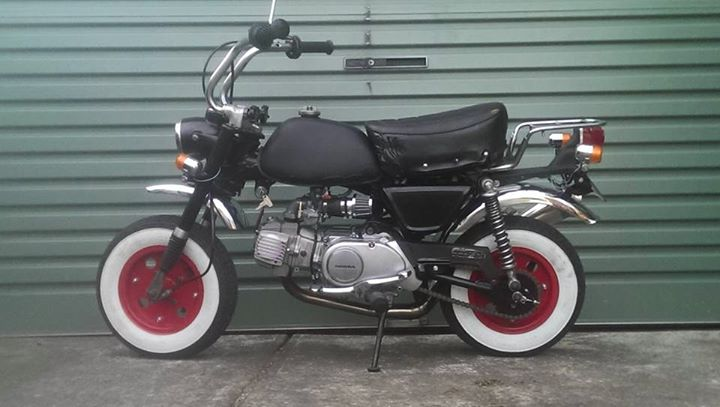

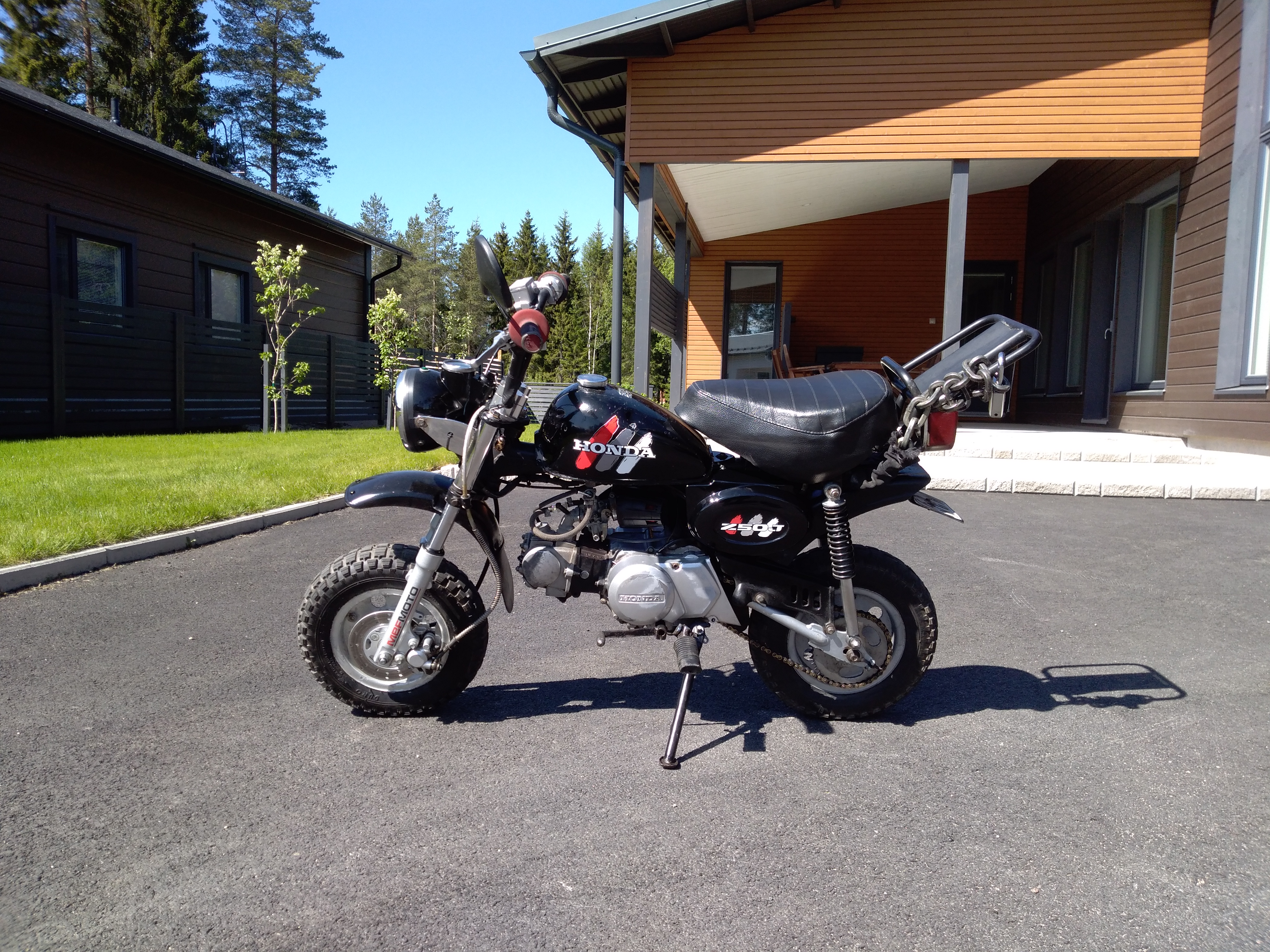

== See also ==
- List of scooter manufacturers
- Minibike
- Pocketbike
- Pit bike
- Types of motorcycles
