= Base 50 =

Type of Honda engine

Honda 50cc engine
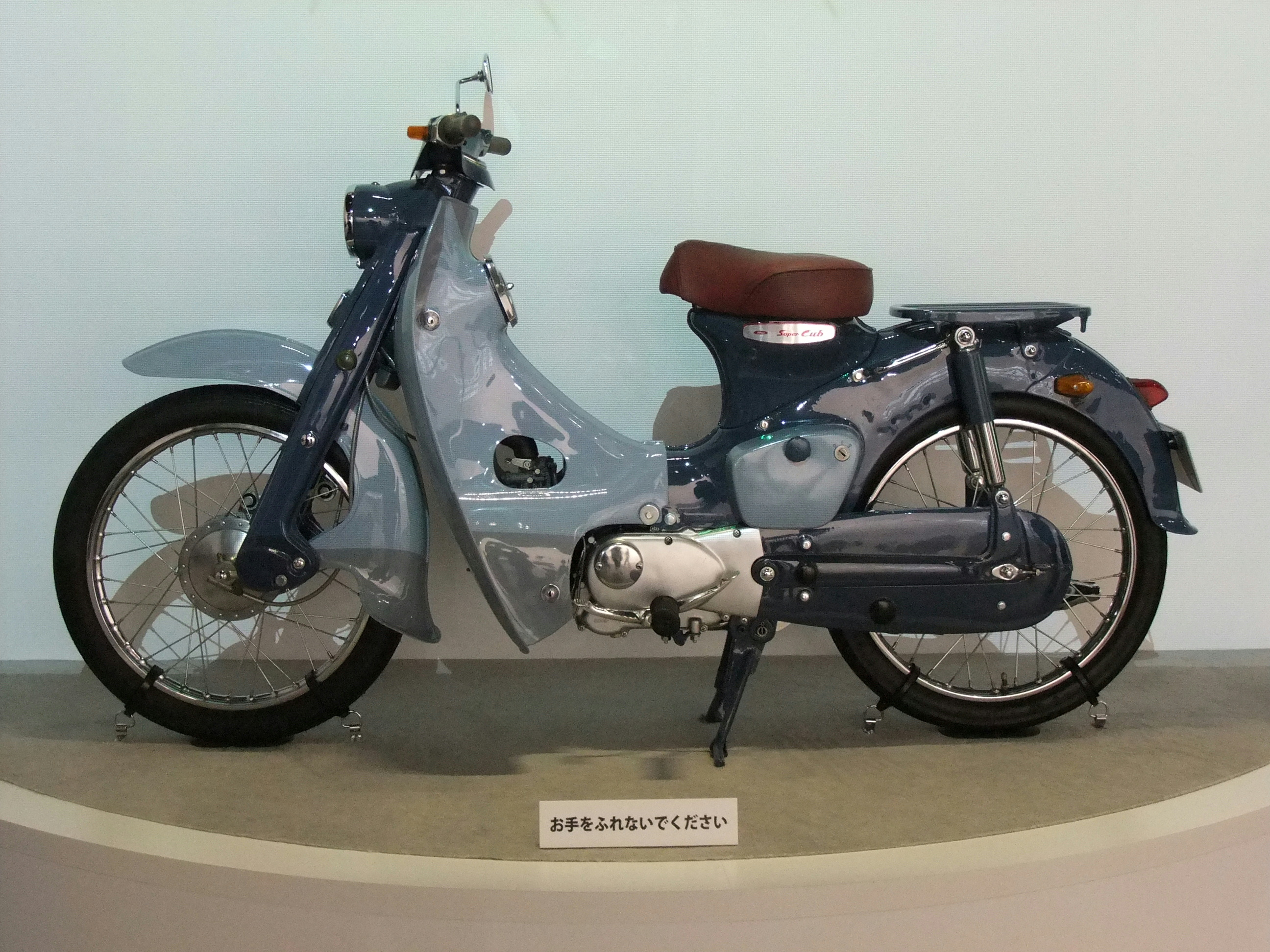
- The Honda 50cc was first offered in the Honda Super Cub seen here.
- Production: 1958-present
- Assembly: 15 countries worldwide
- Class: Motorcycle, scooter, moped, ATV, ATC, pit bike, dirt bike and various power sport machines.
- Engine: Horizontal 49–124 cc (3.0–7.6 cu in) 4-stroke air-cooled single
- Transmission: 3- or 4-speed automated manual with wet multi-plate centrifugal clutch
- Weight: 2–3 kg (4.4–6.6 lb) (dry)
- Related: Lifan Group

A Base 50 engine is a generic term for engines that are reverse-engineered from the Honda 49 cc (3.0 cu in) air-cooled four-stroke single cylinder engine. Honda first offered these engines in 1958, on their Honda Super Cub 50. Honda has offered variations of this engine continuously, in sizes up to 124 cc (7.6 cu in), since its introduction. The Honda Super Cub has been produced in excess of 100,000,000 units, the most successful motorized vehicle in history. With multiple manufactures utilizing clones of the Honda 50 engine for current mopeds, scooters, small motorcycles and power sport machines, it is the most produced engine in history.

The engines are usually identical in form, fit and function to Honda 50cc engines and the parts are usually interchangeable with genuine Honda parts.

The term Base 50 has originated from the importation of modern styled, small Pit Bikes that use the Honda CRF50 as a base for design. Base 50's have also been known as Chondas, a gang term due to influx of Honda clone engines being primarily from China. The name, a portmanteau of "Chinese" or "clone", and "Honda", is seldom used in direct sales marketing.

== Intellectual property infringement ==
Honda has a presence in China and shares manufacturing facilities with local industry, as required by Chinese local content trade law. Despite this, Honda has never pursued infringements regarding patents or intellectual property specifically regarding the Honda 50 or Base 50 engines, as the patents for said engines exceed 30 years. Honda has pursued legal action against Lifan regarding other business practices, including Lifans use of Hongda for marketing motorcycles. Honda also won a patent lawsuit in 2007 regarding a separate infringement for the sale of the Lifan LF100T motorcycle
