= Honda Z series =

Honda minibike series

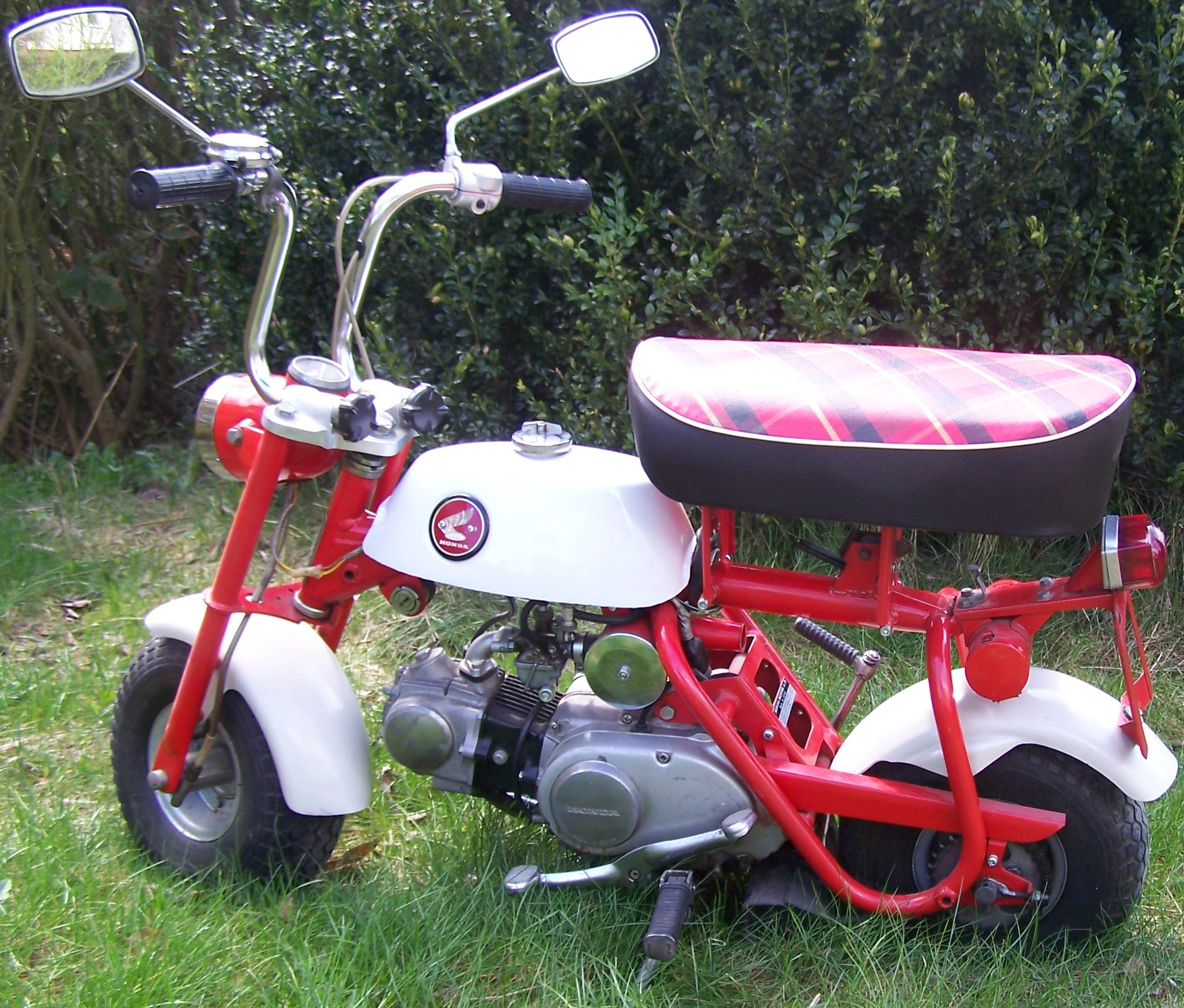
- Honda Z50M
- Manufacturer: Honda
- Also called: Monkey Bike
- Production: 1961-1999
- Predecessor: Honda Super Cub
- Successor: Honda Ape
- Class: Minibike
- Engine: 49 cc (3.0 cu in), OHC, air cooled, four stroke, single
- Transmission: 3-speed semi-automatic transmission
- Frame type: Backbone
- Brakes: Drum
- Related: Honda Z100; Honda CZ100; Honda Z50M; Honda Z50A; Honda Z50J

The Honda Z series or Monkey Bike was a line of minibikes made by Honda which have a model number starting with the letter Z.

== Background ==
The original model of the Honda Z-series was the 1961 prototype Honda Z100, originally produced as a children's ride at the Tama Tech Japanese amusement park. It was eventually refined and put into mass production, hitting the European market in 1964.

== Design ==
Most Z-series bikes are small, light, collapsible motorcycles made for convenience and ease of transportation. They have 50 cc (3.1 cu in) four-stroke engines with an overhead cam. Some have a centrifugal clutch and a standard three-speed manual foot-shift lever, making it a semi-automatic transmission, while others have a conventional manual clutch and a three- or four-speed gearbox.

== History ==
Monkey bike is the name given to a small, low-powered motorcycles introduced by Honda in the 1960s, the first being the 1961 Z100. Later Monkeys were designated Z50, such as the Z50A(US), J, M, R(US) and Z.

These vehicles all had a 4.5-horsepower (3.4 kW), 49-cubic-centimetre (3.0 cu in), single horizontal cylinder, four-stroke engine, and a seat height less than 22 in (560 mm). The first Monkey bikes did not have any suspension, but front suspension was soon added. By 1974, when the Z50J was introduced (US 1972 Z50AK3), suspension had been added to the rear, as well. The first Monkey bikes had 3.5-by-5-inch (89 mm × 127 mm) wheels, but later models had 3.5-by-8-inch (89 mm × 203 mm) wheels.

The early Z series Mini Trails are still highly popular, decades after the end of production, often selling for several times their original price. Refurbishment and upgrade parts are available from a variety of sources and vendors.

The low power of the 49cc engine used in the Mini Trail and Super Cub has resulted in numerous upgrade possibilities, including replacement with larger and newer Honda horizontal engines.

== End of production ==
In March 2017, Honda Motorcycle president Chiaki Kato announced that the Z50 series would be discontinued in August 2017, due to new and pending emission-control regulations in Japan, which would be very difficult for small-displacement engines to meet. The model would be retired with the release of a limited-run 50th Anniversary Special Edition, which was only available to Japanese consumers. An online lottery, open from July 21 to August 21, was used to select buyers of the 500 units, which sold for ¥432,000 (about $3,900) including consumption tax. This final model of the Z50 mixed aspects of the Z50A (1968) and the Z50AK3 (1972) with a plaid-covered seat duplicating the original Z50M and most parts were chrome plated.

== Similar and derivative designs ==
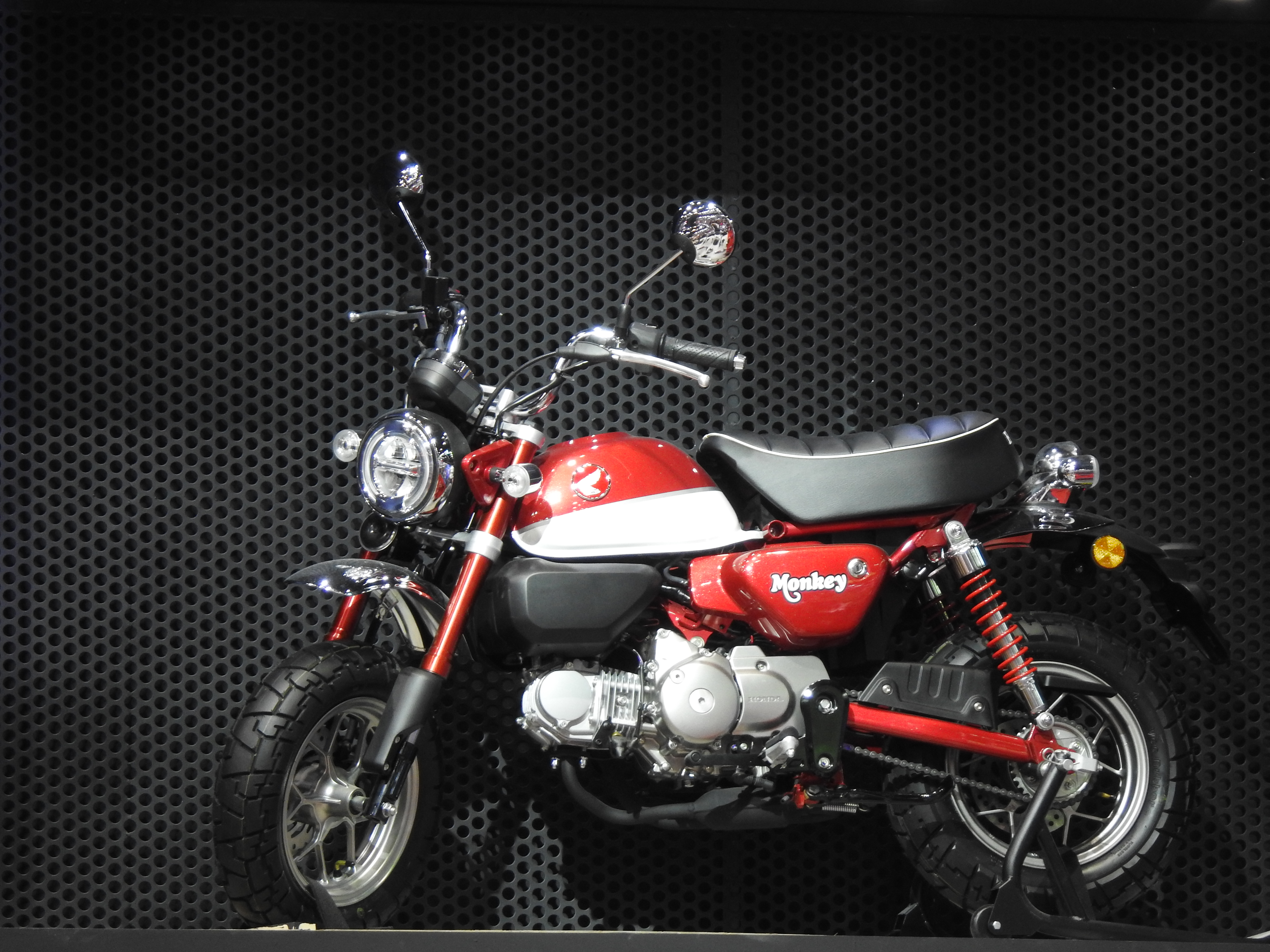
2019 Honda Monkey 125

Numerous similar small motorcycles predate the Honda model, notably the World War II Welbike motorcycle used by parachutists, and limited numbers of minibikes powered by a repurposed lawnmower and chainsaw engines were produced in the 1950s and 1960s. This type of design did not become commonplace or popular until the introduction of the mass-produced Z series.

The Honda Dax model (the ST series in the North American market) is not a Monkey, but rather a bigger, two-seat variant, with larger 10-inch (250 mm) wheels and on some markets also a larger 70 cc (72) engine, instead of 50 cc (49 cc) as the Z50. The name Dax origins from the German word "Dachshund", a breed of dog with a long, sausage-formed body, as the frame of the Dax looks like of them with its long, pressed steel frame. In the US, the Dax was sold as the CT70 (Cross Trail). The Dax models have a monocoque stamped sheet-metal frame, similar to some other early Honda motorcycles. This also houses the fuel tank, battery, and wiring loom.

While Honda has ended production of the Z50, there are several similar trail bikes being produced as licensed replicas in China; some are parts-compatible with original Hondas.

In 2018, Honda introduced the Honda “Monkey 125” (as the 2019 model year). While actually based on the Honda Grom, the model name, styling, and paint scheme are directly inspired by the early Z series.

== See also ==
- List of scooter manufacturers
- Pit bike
- Types of motorcycles
