= Pocketbike =

Two-wheeled vehicle

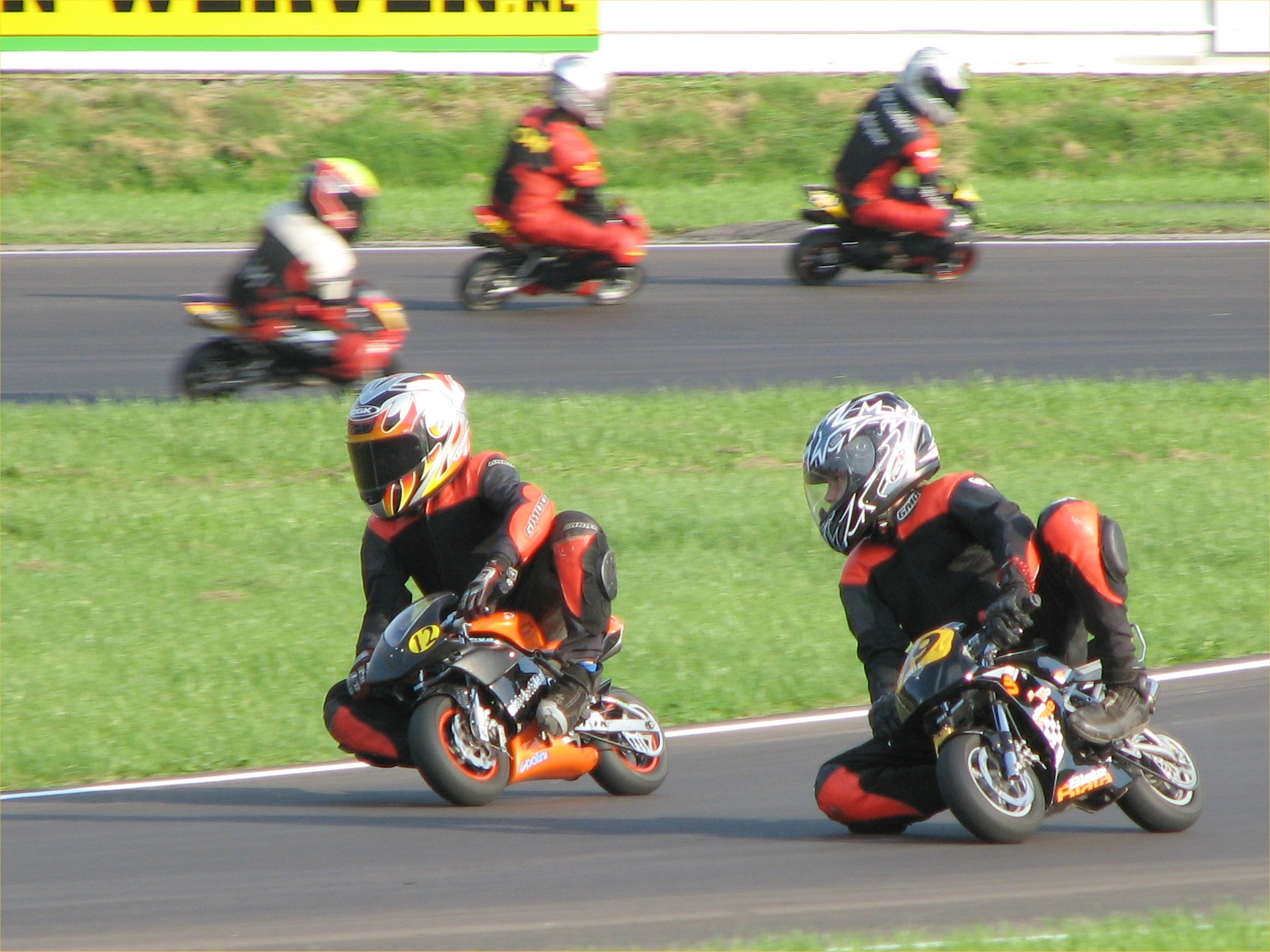
Minibike race at Lelystad (NL)

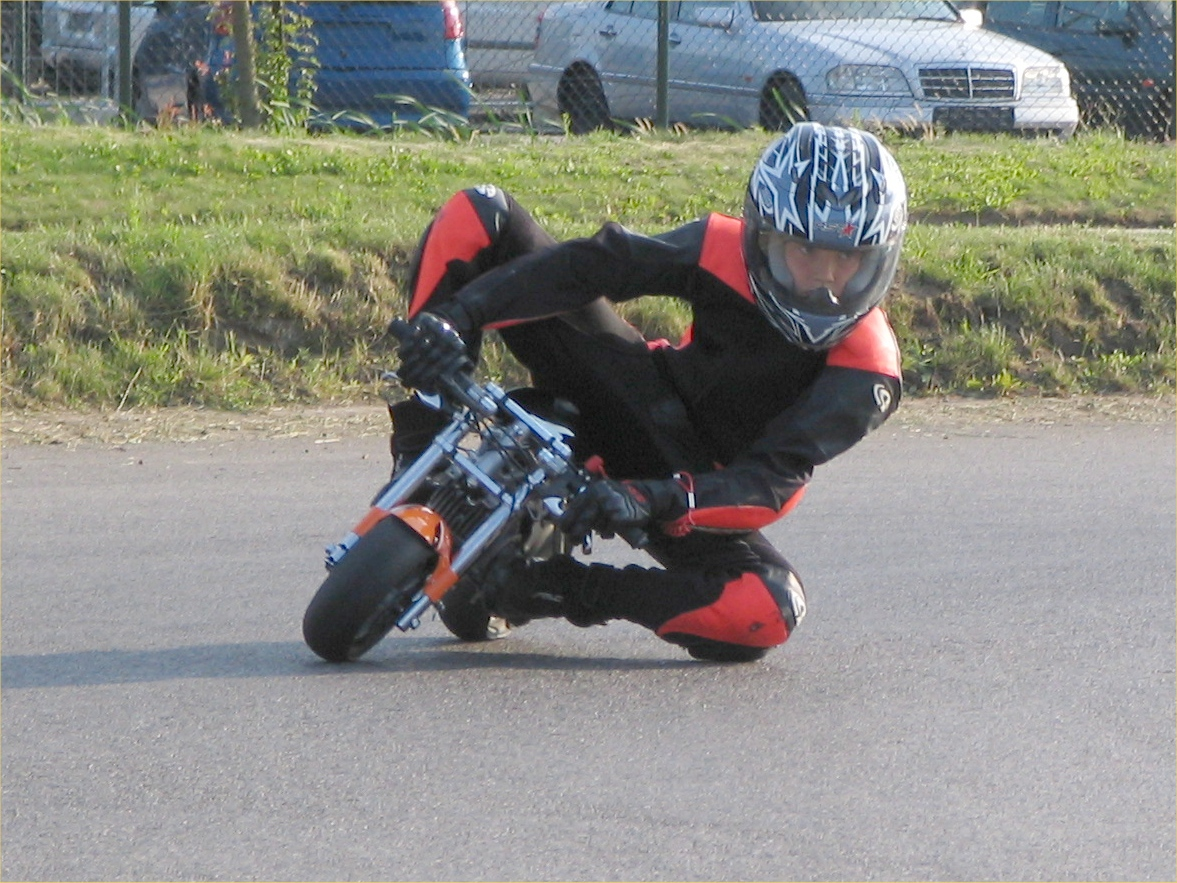
Ivar training at Wilrijk (B)

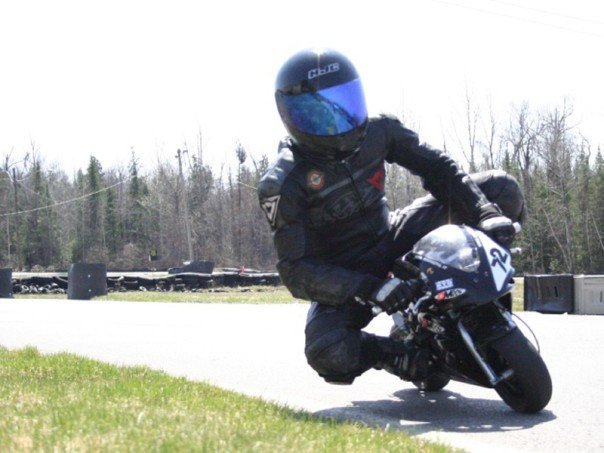
Jerowe at the Sutton track in Ontario, Canada

Pocketbikes are small, two-wheeled recreational vehicles approximately one-quarter the size of a regular motorcycles, and are powered by two-stroke internal combustion engines of between 40 and 50 cc. Pocketbikes maintain the look of full-sized sport bikes and are known outside of North America for racing on specialty tracks designed for small Power Sport machines. These specialized models, designed for competition, produce up to 17 hp, and have front and rear suspension akin to larger sport bikes. Most consumer models are far less powerful, usually below 3hp, and do not feature suspension, relying on the tires alone for shock-absorption. Weight for most machines are approximately 50 lb (23 kg). The usual height is less than 50 cm (20 in), and up to 1 m (3 ft 3 in) length.

The popularity of these types of recreational machines originate from the introduction of Asian Imports to the North American market in late 2003. At the time costing as little as US$200, these machines were unregulated, and many people believed they were legal for use as transportation on public roads. Pocketbikes variations have also been offered featuring four-stroke engines or electric motors, but these are far less common and are a derivative from the import market.

Due to the diminutive size of the machines, and the origins of MiniMoto racing, Pocketbikes have been informally and inaccurately referred to as Minibikes. While the machines share certain attributes, Pocketbikes are more akin to sport bikes than minibikes, and are wholly their own machine by construct. The differences include frame manufacture and material, fairings, controls, engine placement and overall design. The misconception is likely due to two factors; The introduction of Pocketbikes into North America as inexpensive models not recognized for their intended competitive purpose, and being seen as toys rather than unique vehicles. The rapidness of law changes in the mid-2000s to remove previously undefined and unregulated Pocketbikes from public through-ways in American, due to safety concerns, lead to lawmakers hastily lumping Pocketbike in with Minibikes, Mopeds, and Motorized bicycle laws.

Pocketbikes enjoyed a brief stint as recreational vehicles that did not receive citations when used on public roads, due to a lack of regulation. In North America, Pocketbikes have never been legal for use on roads and highways due to lack of safety features, height and visibility concerns. Laws are now in effect in most states and provinces to cite those that operate Pocketbikes on public through-ways or on public land. Due to the popularity of MiniMoto racing in Europe, the UK has maintained laws since the late 1990s regarding the legality of Pocketbikes. Like North America, it is illegal to operate Pocketbikes on Public land or roads, and there are restrictions to their operation on private property where noise pollution can affect other citizens. After the death of a rider from Louth in 2006 fueled public outrage regarding Pocketbikes, UK law was further changed to include a provision to seize and destroy machines operated on Public Roads..

In 2004, the Los Angeles Times reported that the Consumer Product Safety Commission (CPSC) estimated 2,345 injuries as a result of Pocketbike use in the United States.

== Pocketbike racing ==
Pocketbike racing, known as MiniMoto, is a professional, internationally sectioned sport. It is raced by both youth and adults, on specialized, high performance machines. Several notable MotoGP racers and champions first raced in MiniMoto, including Valentino Rossi, Loris Capirossi, Nobuatsu Aoki, and Daijiro Kato. The sport of Minimoto originated in Japan in the 1960s, expanding as a professional sport in the 1970s, before spreading to Italy in the 1980s and most of Europe in the 1990s. Since the introduction of Pocketbikes as a recreational vehicle in North America in the early 2000s, various events have been organized, but there has been no long standing governing body for a series. In 2006, PocketBike Racer, a video game for Xbox 360, was released exclusively through Burger King, as part of a promotional campaign.

== See also ==
- All-terrain vehicle
- Honda Z series—also known as a Monkey bike
- Kart racing
- Mini chopper
- Minibike
- Pit Bike
- Superbike racing
