= Pit bike =

Small recreation, stunt or motocross racing motorcycle

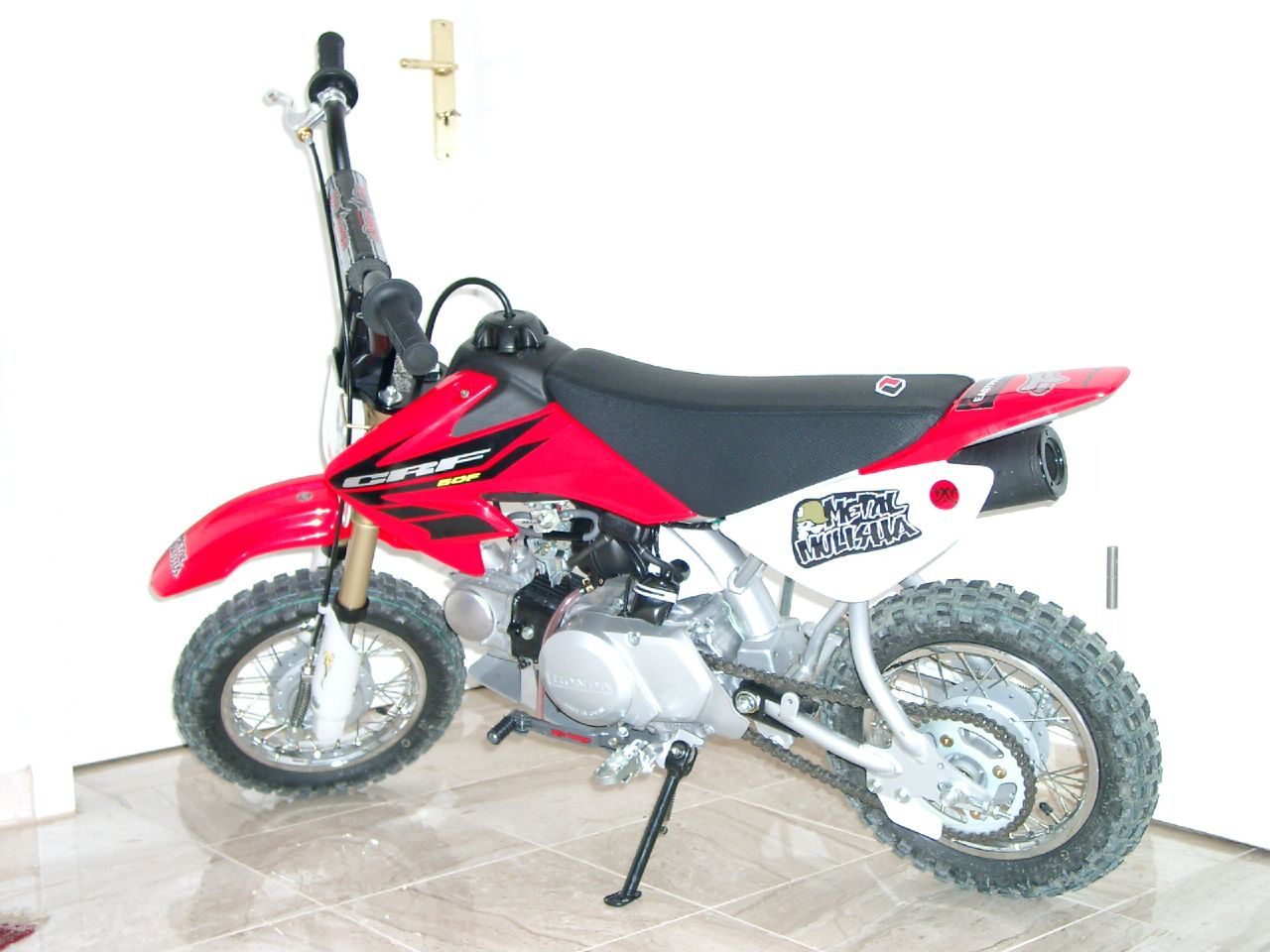
Honda CRF50

A pit bike is a small motorcycle, used primarily for recreational purposes, stunt riding and motocross racing. Pit bikes are characterised by small, air-cooled engines, and are rarely used for professional racing, instead being intended for use in the pit lanes of racing events.

== History ==
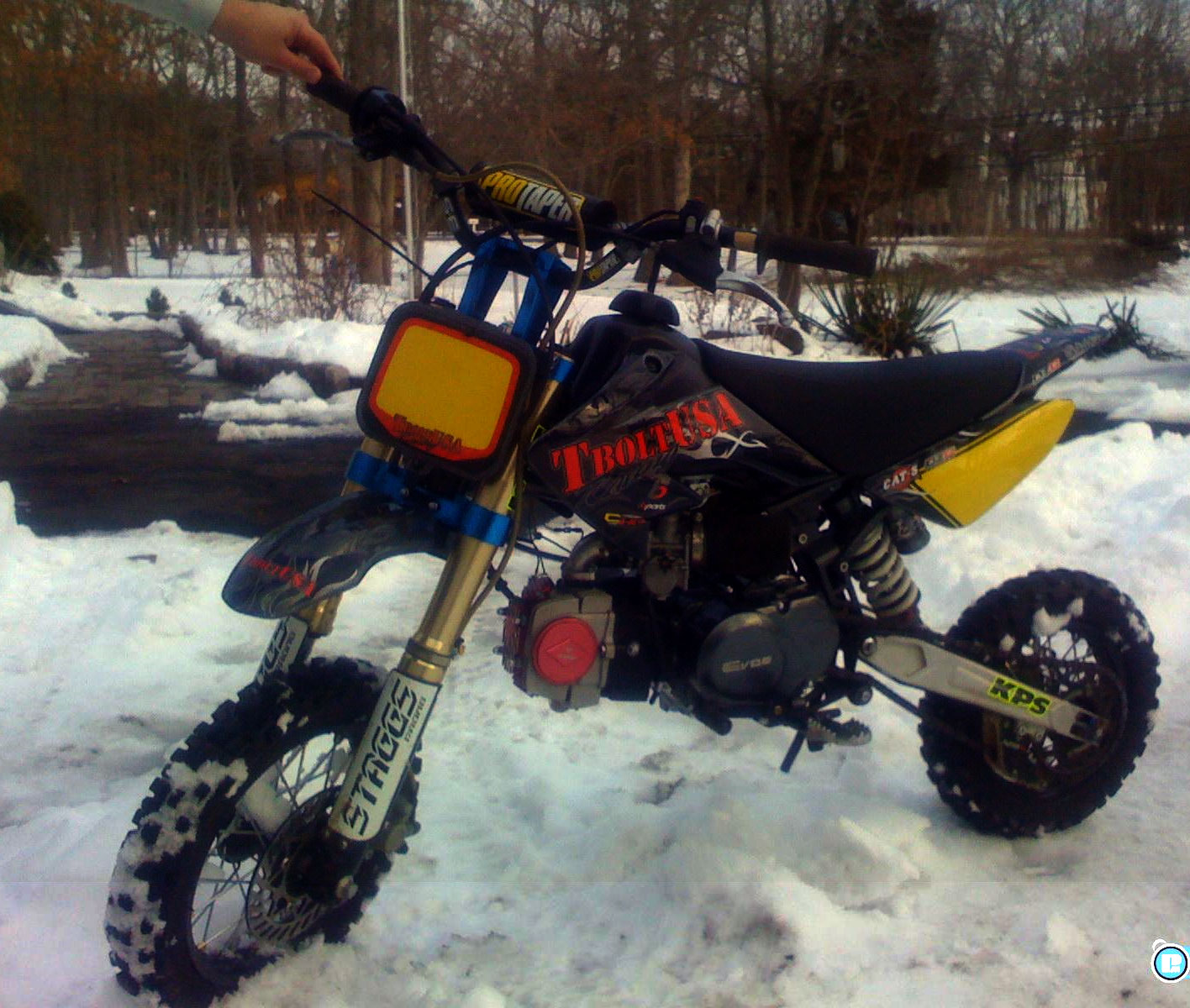
Pit bike with a 125 Engine

=== Invention ===
The pit bike evolved from custom-built motorized bikes that began appearing in the pit lanes of post-war 1940s and 1950s racing events. Initially, the term also applied to the use of bicycles or motorcycles used to navigate event staging areas. These hand-built machines were directly responsible for the creation of the minibike market. The fairly cheap price and the mobility of minibikes made them easy to use and popular at racing events. As the minibike market boomed in the 1960s, Honda introduced the Z series, which became a popular choice to fill this role. With the popularity of off-road motorcycles increasing through the 1980s, the production of inexpensive, introductory-model motocross and dual-sport pit bikes began.

=== Rising popularity ===
Many factors contributed to the popularity of pit bikes, such as the X Games, televised on ESPN, and the creation of promotional direct-to-video stunt films in the 1990s. Series such as the Crusty Demons of Dirt have been credited by fans for inspiring people to race or attempt stunts using undersized motorcycles. This began a popular trend of backyard stunt riding, and the inexpensive, undersized pit bikes became popular for such use. The Internet and video sharing boom of the early 2000s has also credited by fans of such activities on various forums for popularizing pit bike riding off-road.

=== The 2000s ===
By 2001, Honda had discontinued the Z-series in North America, and it was replaced by the Honda XR50R, which became part of the CRF line of motocross bikes in 2004. This new bike, which closely resembled larger off-road motorcycles, was designed as an introduction model specifically for motocross use. As teenagers and young adults began to show interest in these introductory models, a cottage industry for aftermarket parts grew, with the intent of making the bikes more powerful and more comfortable for bigger riders. Some of these parts include heavy duty suspension, tall handle bars, tall seats, and big bore kits. In 2002, Kawasaki released the KLX110, also designed for smaller riders. As the KLX110 is faster and larger than an XR50, it required fewer modifications to make it comfortable for bigger riders. Pit bike riders realized this and started moving to the KLX110. Eventually, most major manufacturers offered a small, introductory motocross bike, which could be repurposed for pit bike racing.

=== Chinese manufacture ===
In the early 2000s, Honda and Yamaha moved the manufacturing of the CRF50, CRF110 and TTR110 pit bikes to China. Honda used a local Chinese company, Sundiro Honda (a joint venture between Sundiro Holding Co. and Honda Motorcycle Co.) to manufacture their models. Not long after, other new companies and brands were founded and started manufacturing in China. These models began appearing on the North American market, marketed and sold by local dealers, and powered by various Base 50 engine configurations.

=== Modern day ===
Now, the most common style of pit bike (now specifically marketed as pit bikes, instead of introductory motocross models) are third-party models based on the Honda CRF50 and are made with a perimeter frame chassis. New versions feature CRF50 motor mounts and tend to have a displacement between 50 and 190 CC. The typical wheel size is a 14" front wheel and 12" rear wheel. These models are less expensive (up to 60% less than Honda and Yamaha models) and use parts compatible with the established aftermarket industry.

== Pit bike racing ==
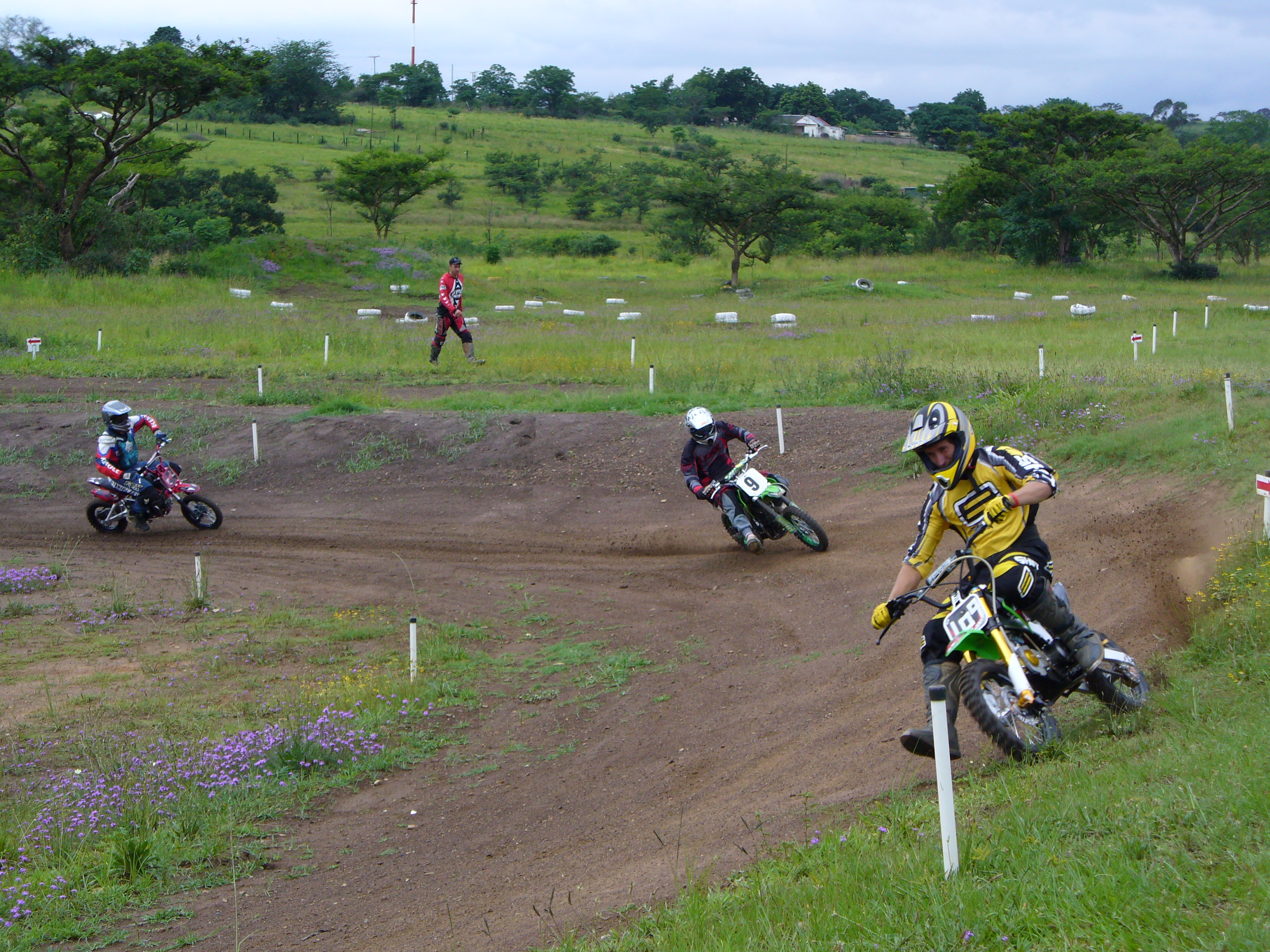
Typical pit bike race

Pit bike racing is a competition sport similar to motocross. It is especially popular with younger riders, as the machines are initially more affordable, less intimidating and easier to maintain than standard motocross bikes. The shorter wheel base, lower centre of gravity and linear power delivery simplifies handling aspects for novice competitors, resulting in fewer accidents and injuries.

A typical pit bike event consists of numerous classes designated by bike types racing for a set number of laps over two or more legs. The winner is determined by the highest average position at the end of the event. Pit bike motocross, often referred to as "minimoto" (not to be confused with MiniMoto Pocketbikes), is the most common discipline of pit bike racing. Extreme sports influences have also made Mini FMX popular. This is a version of Freestyle motocross, with a focus on trick riding. Freestyle motocross riders are known to use pit bikes to learn certain tricks, in an attempt to limit injury if not performed correctly.

Many pit bike race series have appeared across the United States. Series include the 2-Up Minis and Masters of Minis race series, both located in the North East, the Sho-Me series in Missouri, and the annual MiniMoto Supercross race held the day before the final round of the AMA Pro Supercross series in Las Vegas, NV. In 2020 Travis Pastrana introduced the Pastranaland Bike World Championship.

Pit Bikes are also used for stunt riding. For serious stunting, it is recommended by practitioners that modifications, including pegs and an additional lever above the clutch for the rear brake (for when the rider's right foot is not covering the brake pedal) be utilized. A 12 bar can also be added to the subframe which is designed to prevent a bike from flipping.

== See also ==
- All-terrain vehicle
- Honda Z series - also known as a Monkey bike
