= Minibike =

Two-wheeled, motorized, off-highway recreational vehicle

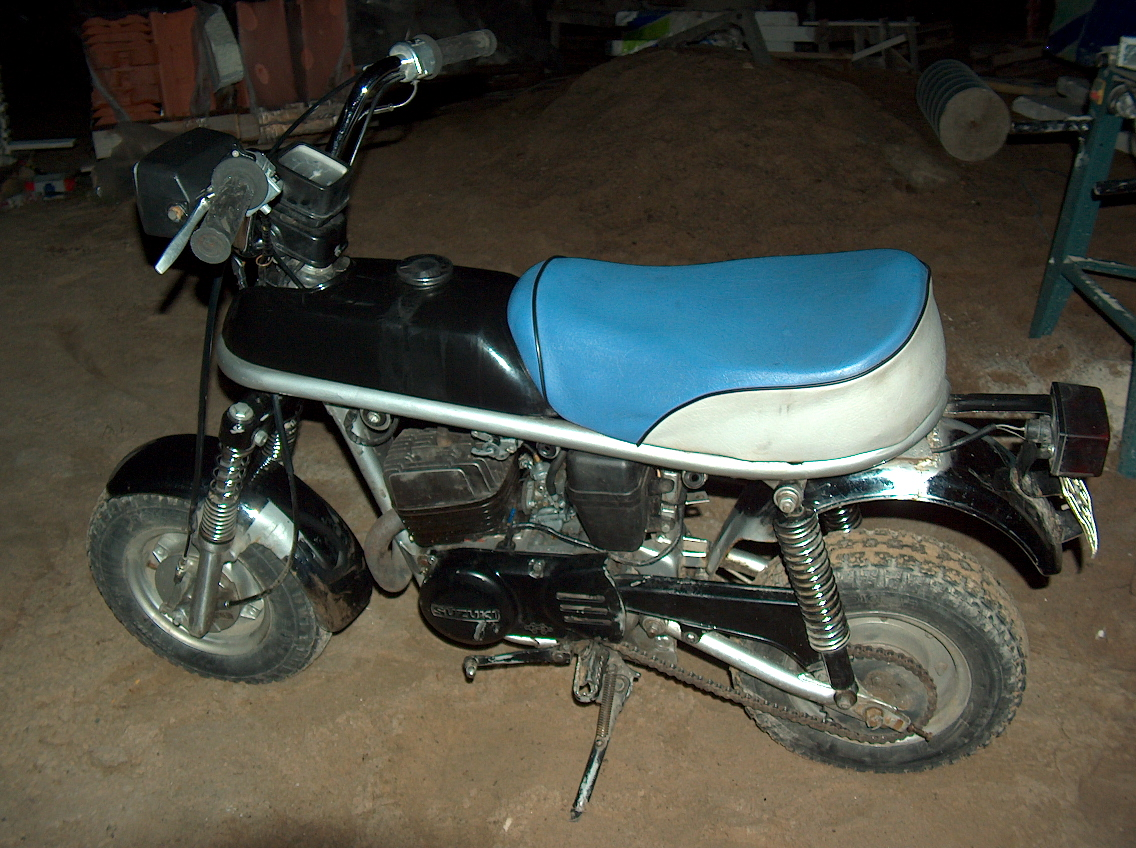
1997 Suzuki PV 50, Finland

A minibike is a two-wheeled, motorized, off-highway recreational vehicle popularized in the 1960s and 1970s, but available continuously from a wide variety of manufacturers since 1959. Their off-highway nature and (in many countries) typically entirely off-road legal status differentiate minibikes from motorcycles and mopeds, and their miniature size differentiates them from dirt bikes.

Traditionally, minibikes have a four-stroke, horizontal crankshaft engine, single- or two-speed centrifugal clutch transmissions with chain final-drive, 100 or 150 mm (4 or 6 in) wheels and a low frame/seat height with elevated handlebars. Commercially available minibikes are usually equipped with small engines commonly found elsewhere on utilitarian equipment such as garden tillers.

== History ==
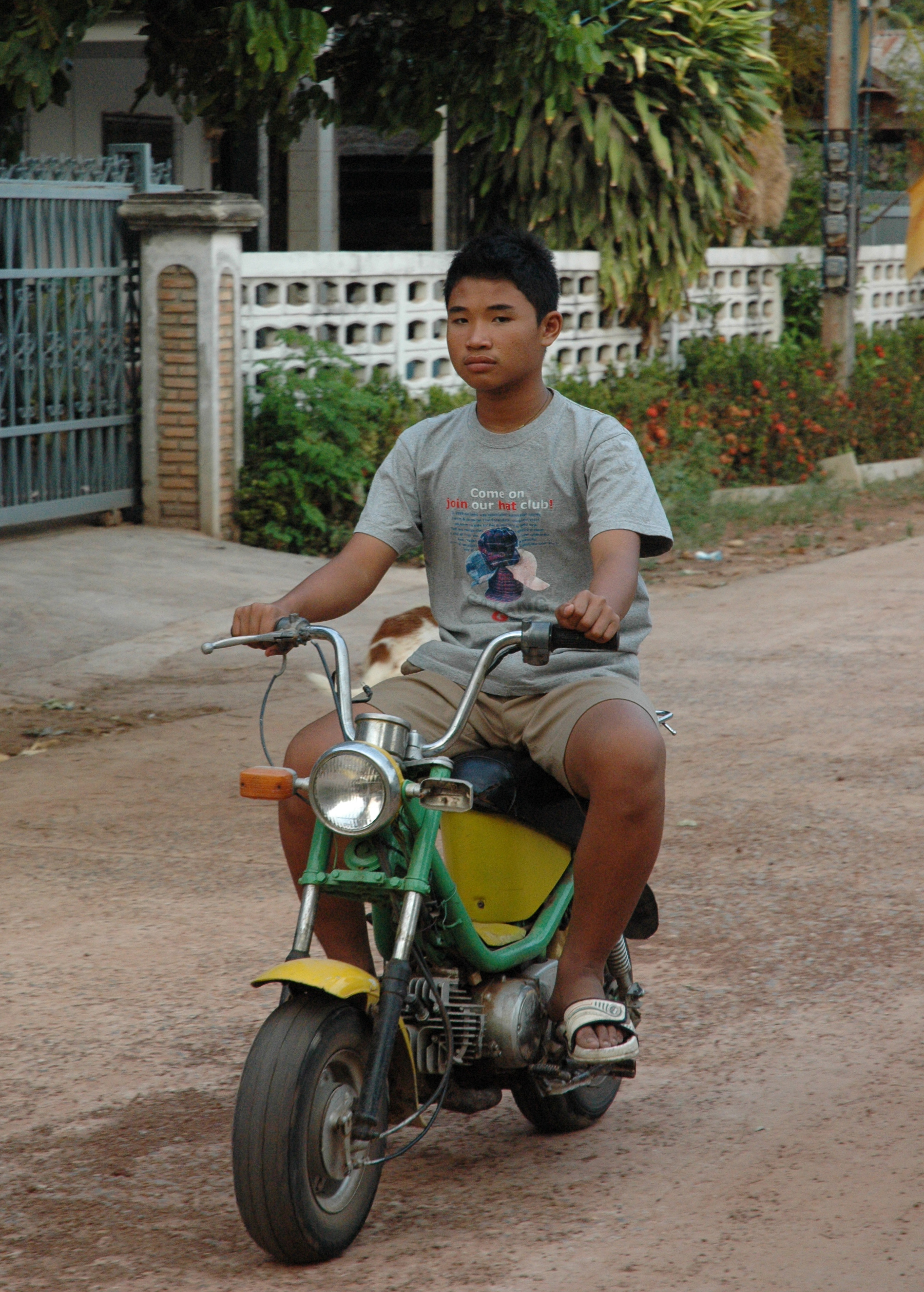
A teenager on a minibike in Thailand

While the minibike had precursors in machines such as the Doodle Bug and Cushman Scooters, which share smaller wheels, tubular-steel frames, and air-cooled, single-cylinder engines, those vehicles had larger seat heights and lighting that allow them to be registered for road use as scooters. In the 1950s, minibikes were hand-made by enthusiasts. These were first popularly used as pit bikes, for drag racers to travel in the staging-areas during races. One of these "Pit bikes" was received by brothers Ray, Larry and Regis Michrina in early 1959 from local car dealer and racer, Troy Ruttman.

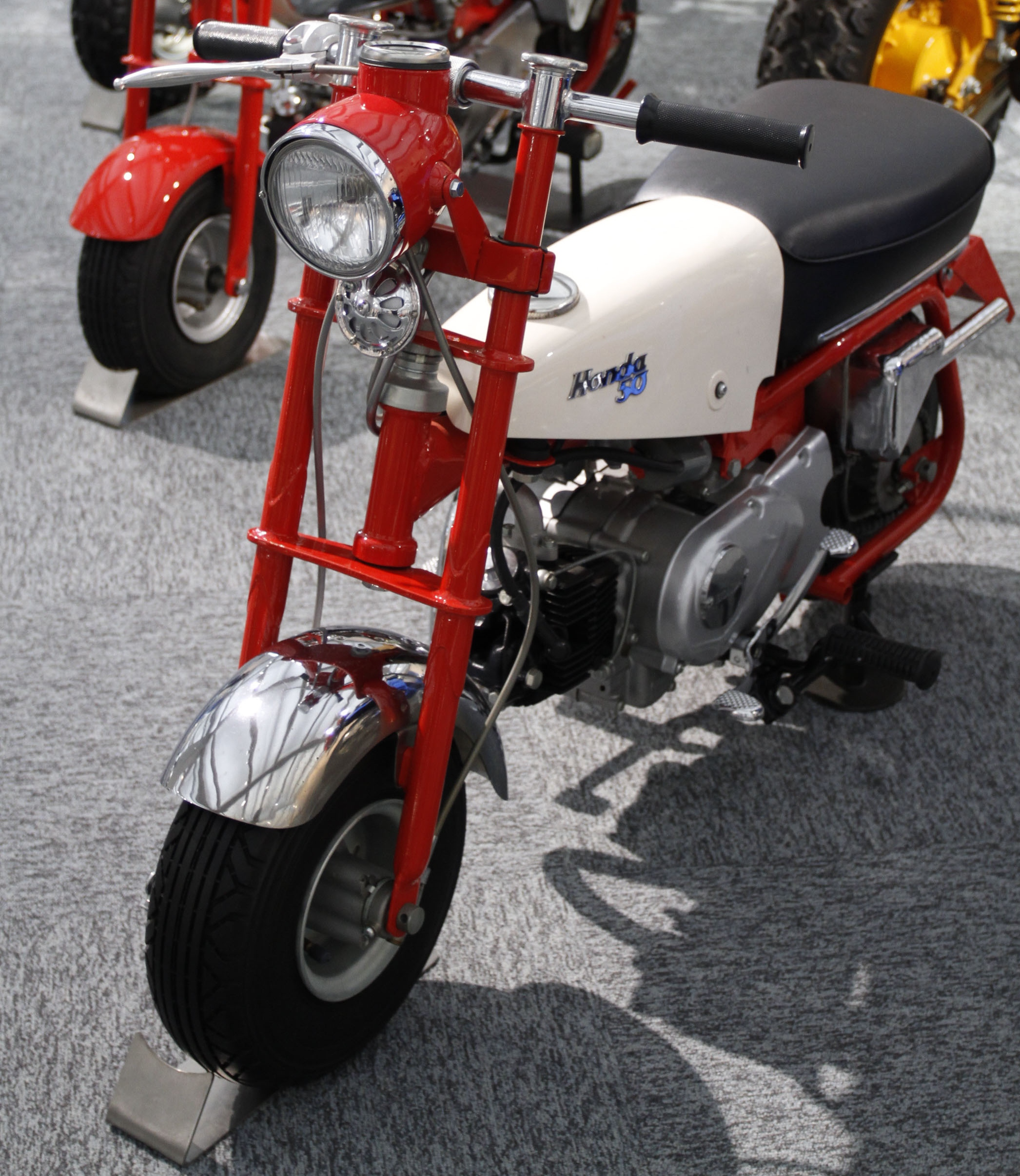
1961 Honda 50 minibike, Honda Collection Hall transport museum, photographed in 2010

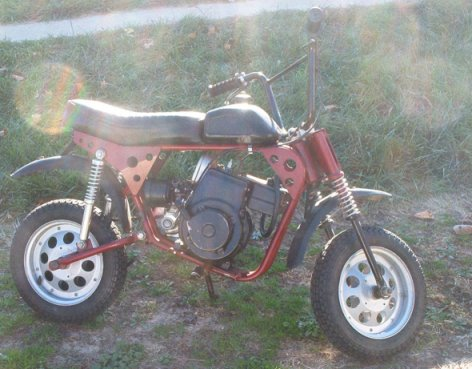
A minibike powered by a small engine.

The Michrina Brothers would create the first commercial minibikes by drawing inspiration from this Pit Bike, delivering 3 prototypes to Troy Ruttman to sell through his dealership. The Michrina brothers are credited with creating the minibike but failed to patent the design or trademark the term when founding their Lil Indian brand in 1959. Lil Indian would go on to manufacture tens-of-thousands of minibikes in their 40+ years. From the mid-1960s into the 1970s, the popularity of said machines would see over a hundred manufacturers attempt to market machines, an inexpensive venture due to the absence of patents. So popular and simple was the design, June 1967 Popular Mechanics magazine included an article with plans.

As the market for minibikes developed, a variety of cottage and major industries offered models, including Arctic Cat, Rupp, Taco, Heath, Gilson, Sears, and Fox. Many of these manufacturers used off the shelf components in particular the engines, often Briggs & Stratton or Tecumseh, which were already standardized to fit many different types of power equipment (tillers, lawnmowers, pressure washers, etc) thus reducing their own manufacturing costs. Traditional motorcycle manufacturers also released models inspired by aspects of minibikes, most famously Honda with the Z50A, though this style was nicknamed a Monkey Bike due to its monkey-like riding position. Sales peaked in 1973, with 140,000 units between manufacturers. By 1976 the bubble had burst and fewer than ten manufacturers continued to make minibikes. Popularity declined steadily, but leveled off in the early 1990s. Currently, machines can still be found at various retailers for less than $800.

The wide availability of cheap, generic components manufactured in China has given rise to a resurgence in popularity of minibikes. These bikes typically have simple, boxy tube frames, small wheels, and are often built with parts repurposed from Go-Karts, dirt bikes, and other lawn and garden equipment. Coleman, a manufacturer of outdoor recreation equipment has released a new line of minibikes under their Coleman Powersports brand, which have become very popular as they are inexpensive and a simple design. Most minibikes today run on modern designs of standardized small engines, such as the Honda GX and GX based clones. Entire cottage industries have formed that provide performance modifications for these engines to increase the stock speed and power of minibikes, parts are inexpensive and modification can be very easy. Its not uncommon to see vintage minibikes powered by these new engines due to better parts availability and performance gains. Despite not being road legal, recreational riding of these bikes, especially in large groups, has become popular in many cities in Southern California.

== Legal status ==
In some jurisdictions, it is not legal to operate minibikes in certain places or without regulatory-specified special equipment.

=== Canada ===
Minibikes can be classified as a competition vehicle if it is imported to Canada or restricted-use motorcycle that must have a Vehicle Identification Number. Models for younger children are marked as ride on toys for they do not meet Transportation in Canada safety requirements. When caught ride a minibike on public roads you will be charged under the Highway Traffic Act (HTA) and the Compulsory Automobile Insurance Act (CAIA).

=== UK ===
It is not legal for Minibikes to be used on public roads or land unless it has passed a vehicle inspection (MOT) and subsequently been registered for road use. Further, it is not legal to use Minibikes on a property in proximity to a population if cited for noise pollution.

=== US ===
Whilst laws vary by state, Minibikes became unlawful for use on public through-ways due to lack of safety equipment, lights, and their diminutive size causing visibility issues. In 1977, the CPSC was unsuccessfully lobbied to add federal regulation to Minibikes. By 1979 in the US, Minibikes could not be operated on public roads, they could still operate in areas legal for use of other recreational vehicles, provided they had a specified set of proper equipment utilized at the time of sale, most notably a spark arrestor for the exhaust. In many US states mini bikes can be made street legal.

== See also ==
- All-terrain vehicle
- Derny
- Honda Z series - also known as a Monkey bike.
- Mini chopper
- Pit bike
- Pocketbike
- Tote Gote
