= Honda CT50 Motra =

Honda minibike

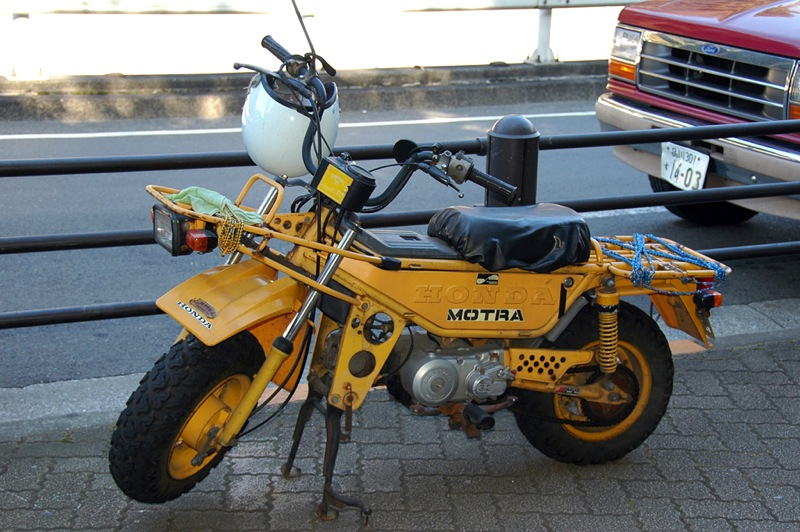
- Honda Motra
- Manufacturer: Honda Motor Company
- Production: 1982–1983
- Engine: AD05E 49 cc (3.0 cu in), air-cooled, 4-stroke, single
- Power: 4.5 hp (~3.3 kW) @ 7,500 rpm (~785.4 rad/s)
- Torque: 0.46 kg-m (~4.5 Nm)@ 5,500 rpm (~575.96 rad/s)
- Transmission: two-stage 3-speed semi-automatic transmission with wet multi-plate centrifugal clutch
- Suspension: telescopic fork Rear: Swingarm
- Brakes: Front: drum Rear: drum
- Tires: PR 5.40-10-4
- Wheelbase: 1.125 m (44.3 in)
- Dimensions: L: 1.655 m (65.2 in); W: 0.740 m (29.1 in); H: 0.975 m (38.4 in)
- Seat height: 0.720 m (28.3 in)
- Weight: 76 kg (168 lb) (dry); 81 kg (179 lb) (wet)
- Fuel capacity: 4.5 L (0.99 imp gal; 1.2 US gal)
- Fuel consumption: 100.0 km/L @ 30 km/h

The Honda Motra is a minibike produced in 1982–83 for the Japanese domestic market.

Honda marketed the vehicle as a heavy-duty recreation bike with a large load capacity.

The Motra has a distinctively rugged appearance, with angular steel tube and panel framework supporting large racks fore and aft. The utility/military style is emphasized by a lack of decorative chrome, and a solid yellow or green paint scheme for all bodywork and wheels.

The Motra's 3-speed gearbox is coupled with a second stage to provide the same 3-speeds with a lower final ratio for low-speed off-road travel in steep terrain.

The Motra's CT50 designation is a slight exception in Honda nomenclature in that 'CT' does not indicate a mechanical family of bikes. It is distinct from the CT70, which is an ST-series bike for the US and Canadian market, and from the CT50/CT90/CT110 Trail Cubs, which are an offshoot of the Super Cub bikes. The Motra's CT50 designation is a re-use of the Trail Cub CT50 designation from 1968.

In 2004 Honda resurrected the Motra's style, but not off-road utility, with the PS250 Big Ruckus scooter.

== See also ==
- Honda CT series bikes
