= Honda CT50 =

Honda CT50 may refer to:

- Honda CT50 Hunter Cub, a small off-road motorbike introduced in 1968.
- Honda CT50 Motra, a minibike introduced in 1982.
