= Honda ST series (minibike) =

Honda DAX

1969 ST50 & ST70
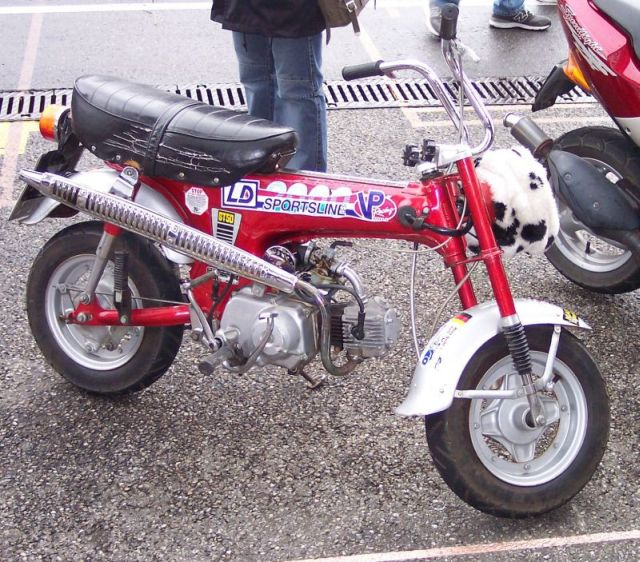
- Manufacturer: Honda Motor Company
- Production: 1969-1981, 1995-2000 (ST50); 1969-1981 (ST70); 1969-1982, 1991-1994 (CT70); 1973-1975 (ST90), 2023+ (ST125)
- Engine: OHC 4-stroke 49 cc <72 cc>
- Top speed: 45km/h>70 km/h <75 km/h>
- Power: 4.5 hp @ 9,000 rpm <6.0 hp @ 9,000 rpm>
- Torque: 0.37 kg-m @ 8,000 rpm <0.51 kg-m @ 7,000 rpm>
- Transmission: 3-speed semi-automatic, 4-speed manual
- Tires: 3.50-10
- Wheelbase: 1.035 m
- Dimensions: L: 1.510 m [exports 1.495 m] W: .580 m H: .960 m
- Weight: 64 kg <65 kg> (dry)
- Fuel capacity: 2.5 L
- Fuel consumption: 90 km/L @ 25 km/h <85 km/L @ 25 km/h>
- Turning radius: 1.600 m

The Honda ST-series minibikes are known as the Dax in Japan and Europe, and the Trail 70 in Canada and the US.

The ST70 was exported to Canada and the US as the CT70. This is an exception to Honda's usual practice of prefix letters indicating the bike family, followed by engine size. The CT70 is mechanically unrelated to other CT-series bikes such as the CT50 Motra, and the CT50, CT90 & CT110 Trail Cubs. The ST90 was sold in the US as the Trailsport, and was not given a CT designation.

The ST50, ST70, and CT70 were introduced in August 1969 and produced through 1981. The larger ST90 was produced from 1973 through 1975. The ST50 was reissued in 1995, and produced through 2000.

The CT70 was also sold in the US from 1981 through 1994 with a new serial number format: JH2Dxxxxxxxxxxxxx, rather than the CT70-xxxxxxx format used since 1969. These 'JH2D' bikes are not listed in Honda Japan's production figures above and are perhaps licensed production.

A key feature of the ST-series is the pressed-steel "T-bone" frame that distinguishes it from Honda's other minibikes: the Z50 Monkey & Gorilla, the Ape, the CF50 & CF70, and the CY50 & CY80 Nautydax.

As a general description, the ST-series bikes have a bench-style saddle, small fat tires, and folding handle bars. They have an air-cooled 4-stroke engine with either a 3-speed semi-automatic transmission, with an automatic centrifugal clutch, or a 4-speed manual gearbox. The ST90 uses larger 3.00-14 tires, compared to the 3.50-10 and 4.00-10 of the smaller bikes. For more detail about individual models, see the accompanying Infoboxes and the External Links section below.

Due to the diminutive wheel-size and limited speed, the ST-series bikes do not always qualify as road-legal vehicles and were sold in some markets for off-road recreation only. Their licensing status varies with locale and time period during their nearly 40 years of existence.

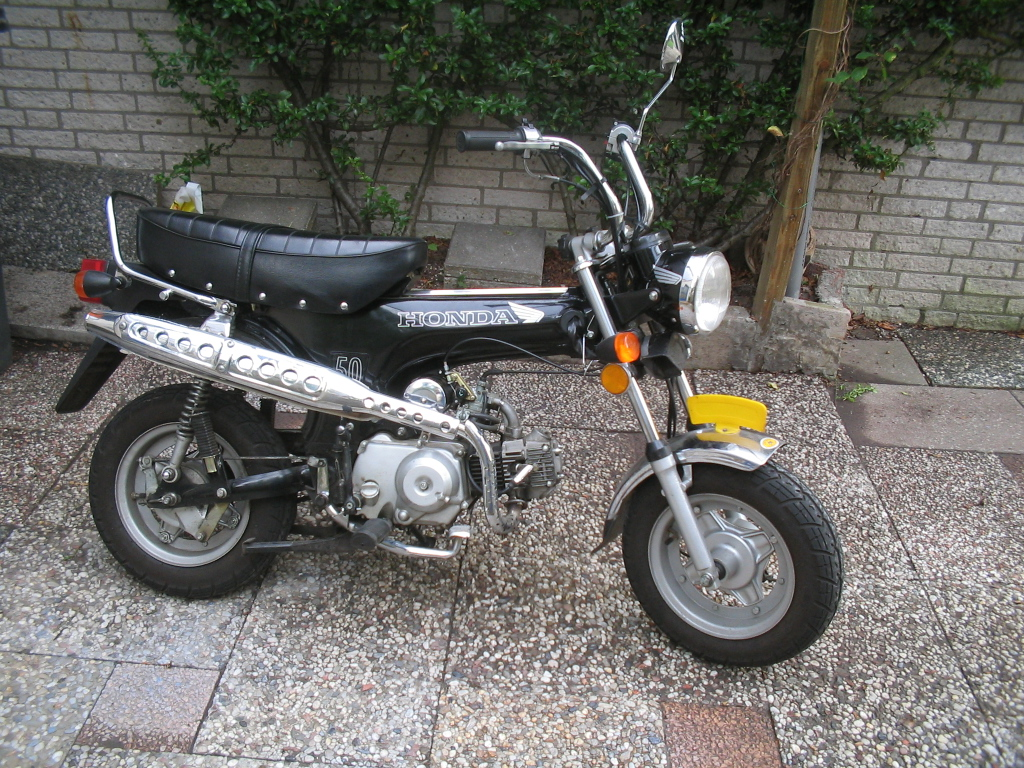
Jincheng JC50Q

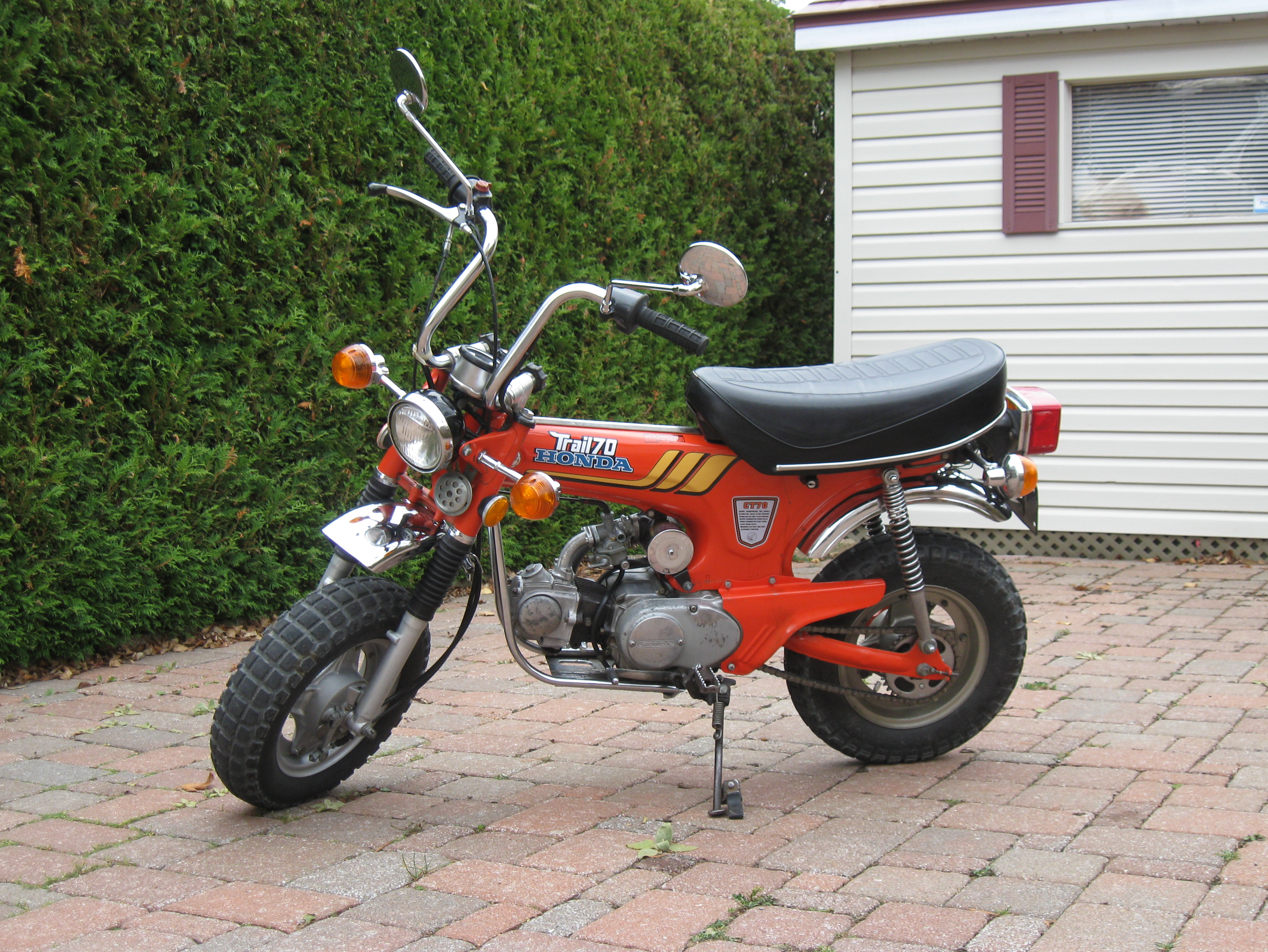
A 1977 Honda CT-70, also known as a Mini-Trail.

Honda's patents for the original ST-series expired in 1998, and replica bikes have become a popular export product for many Chinese manufacturers such as Jincheng, Lifan, Panda, and Redcat.

The Dax name resurfaced at the 2001 Tokyo Motor Show with the e-DAX concept vehicle, a 25 kg folding electric wheel motor scooter meant to accompany the Bulldog concept car as a trunk bike. This car-scooter combination was previously introduced by Honda in 1981 with the City car and Motocompo folding scooter.

In 2023 the ST125 was released in the European market.

== More specifications ==
1971 ST50 IV
- Manufacturer: Honda Motor Company
- Engine: OHC 4-stroke 49 cc 72 cc
- Power: 4.5 hp @ 9,000 rpm <6.0 hp @ 9,000 rpm>
- Torque: 0.37 kg-m @ 8,000 rpm <0.51 kg-m @ 7,000 rpm>
- Brakes: drum
- Dimensions: L: 1.565 m W: .630 m H: .960 m
- Weight: 65 kg <66 kg> (dry)
- Fuel consumption: 80 km/L @ 30 km/h <60 km/L @ 50 km/h>

1976 ST70 VI
- Manufacturer: Honda Motor Company
- Engine: OHC 4-stroke 72 cc
- Power: 5.5 hp @ 8,000 rpm
- Torque: 0.51 kg-m @ 7,000 rpm
- Brakes: Expanding Brake
- Tires: 3.50-10-2PR
- Wheelbase: 1.035 m
- Dimensions: L: 1.590 m W: 0.630 m H: 0.955 m
- Weight: 70 kg (dry); 75 kg (wet)
- Fuel capacity: 2.5 L gasoline
- Fuel consumption: 60 km/L gasoline

1979 ST50-M (manual clutch) <ST50-C (centrifugal clutch)>
- Manufacturer: Honda Motor Company
- Engine: OHC 4-stroke 49 cc
- Power: 4.1 hp @ 8,000 rpm
- Torque: 0.37 kg-m @ 6,000 rpm
- Transmission: 4-speed manual, with clutch <3-speed centrifugal clutch(semi-automatic)>
- Tires: 4.00-10-2PR
- Dimensions: L: 1.610 m <1.600 m> W: 0.705 m <0.680 m> H: 1.005 m <00.995 m>
- Fuel capacity: 2.5 L
- Fuel consumption: 80 km/L @ 30 km/h
- Turning radius: 1.6 m

1995 ST50
- Manufacturer: Honda Motor Company
- Also called: AB26
- Engine: AB26E OHC 4-stroke 49 cc
- Power: 2.6 hp @ 7,000 rpm
- Torque: 0.29 kg-m @ 4,500 rpm
- Transmission: 3-speed centrifugal clutch semi-automatic
- Tires: 3.50-10 51J
- Wheelbase: 1.045 m
- Dimensions: L: 1.510 m W: 0.590 m H: 0.980 m
- Seat height: 0.735 m
- Weight: 72.3 kg (dry); 75 kg (wet)
- Fuel capacity: 2.5 L
- Fuel consumption: 80.0 km/L @ 30 km/h
- Turning radius: 1.6 m

2023 ST125
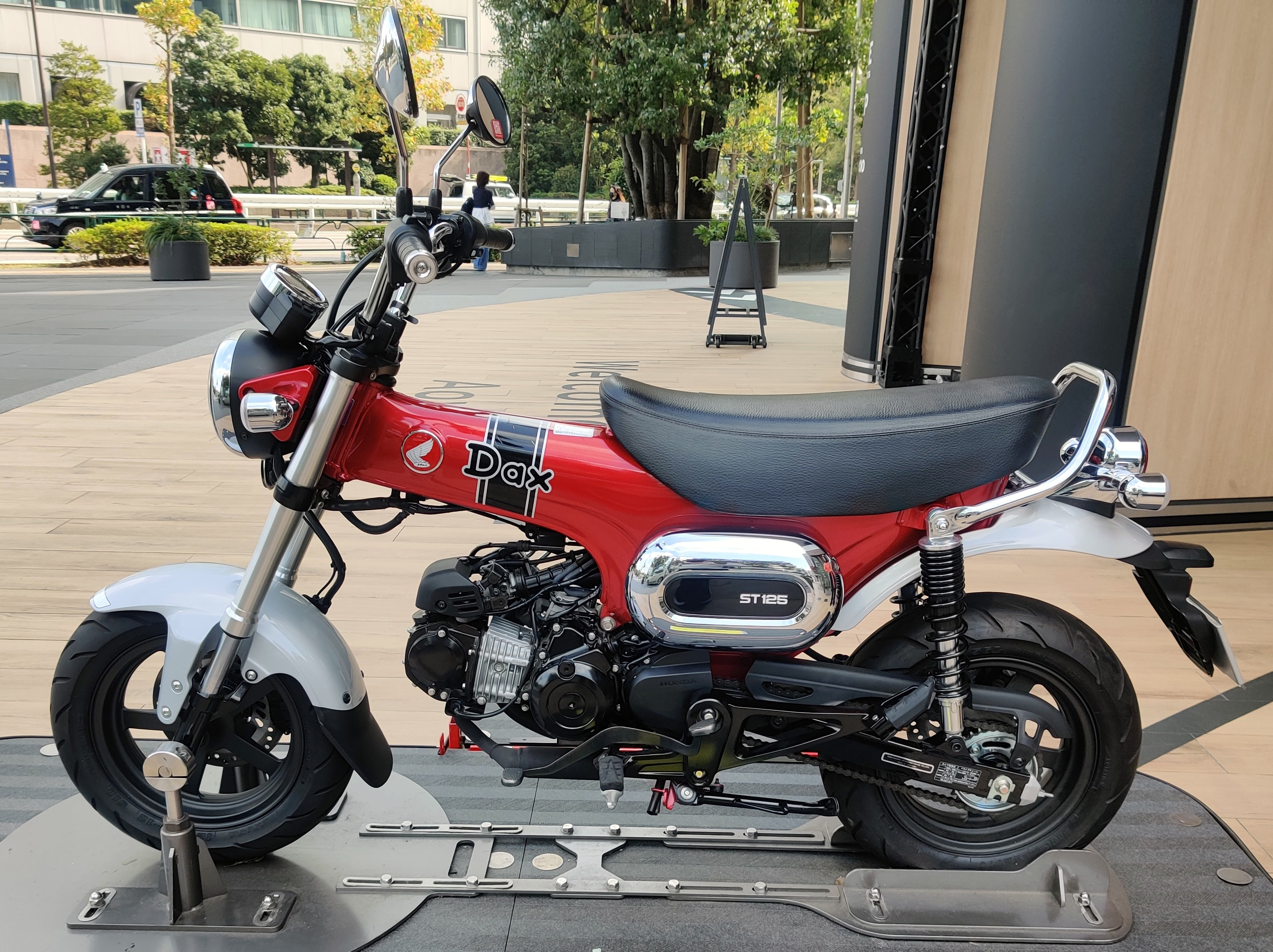
- Manufacturer: Honda Motor Company
- Also called: Dax 125
- Engine: Air-cooled SOHC 4-stroke 2-valve
- Power: 6.9kW / 7000rpm
- Torque: 10.8Nm / 5,000rpm
- Transmission: 4 speed rotary Wet Multiplate and Automatic Centrifugal Clutch semi-automatic
- Tires: 120/70-12M/C 51L front, 130/70-12M/C 56L rear
- Wheelbase: 1200 mm
- Seat height: 775 mm
- Fuel capacity: 3.8 L
- Fuel consumption: 66.7 km/L
- Turning radius: 2.0 m
