= Honda Foresight =

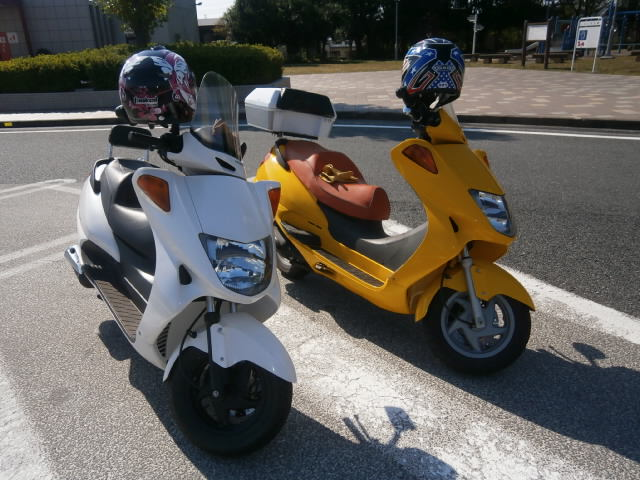
- Manufacturer: Honda
- Also called: Honda FES 250; Peugeot SV 250
- Production: 1997-2007
- Predecessor: Honda CN250
- Successor: Honda Forza/Jazz
- Class: Maxi-scooter
- Engine: 249.4 cc (15.2 cu in) liquid-cooled SOHC single
- Transmission: V-Matic continuously variable transmission
- Suspension: Front: trailing link fork Rear: swingarm
- Brakes: Front: disc Rear: drum
- Tires: Front: 110/90-12; Rear: 130/70-12
- Wheelbase: 1,450 mm (57.1 in)
- Dimensions: L: 2,070 mm (81.5 in); W: 735 mm (28.9 in); H: 1,410 mm (55.5 in)
- Seat height: 725 mm (28.5 in)
- Fuel capacity: 12 L (2.6 imp gal; 3.2 US gal)
- Related: Honda Pantheon

The Honda Foresight (chassis code Honda FES 250 or MF04) is a scooter produced by Honda from 1997 to 2007. Was also sold by Peugeot Motocycles rebadged as Peugeot SV 250.

== History ==
Presented in June 1997, the Foresight was born as a maxiscooter heir to the Honda CN250 and has a design inspired by motorcycles, taking up the same V-shaped front projector from the Honda CBR1100XX, while the tail is clearly inspired by that of the Honda Accord sedan with the two lights connected in one piece.

The Foresight was only offered with a 250 engine and was sold globally, achieving great success especially in Europe, so much so that Honda's top management developed two versions with a cubic capacity reduced to 125 and 150 cc, called the Honda Pantheon and produced in Italy at the Atessa plant from 1998.

At launch, it featured a brand new frame with the CBS integral braking system in which, by acting only on the left lever, both the rear drum brake and the central piston of the front disc are activated simultaneously. The saddle is 745 mm high from the ground and the compartment under it has a capacity of 40 litres.

The 250 engine is a single-cylinder four-stroke 249 cubic centimetre two-valve liquid-cooled engine that delivers 21 horsepower at 7000 rpm, the brakes are 240 mm front disc and 160 mm rear drum.

At the beginning of 2000, both the Foresight and its twin Pantheon proved to be among the best-selling scooters in Italy and the production of specimens for the European market was moved to the Atessa plant of Honda Italia Industriale S.p.A. The Italian-made model also debuts a new 220mm rear disc brake, updates to the CBS system and improved overall build quality. The dashboard with digital elements is also introduced. The engine is Euro 1 approved by adopting the standard ACR catalyst and power drops to 19.2 HP.

In June 2005 the latest update made its debut with the engine which was Euro 2 approved and the passenger handles in the same color as the bodywork and a new front light group were introduced.

Production ends in August 2007 replaced by the Honda Forza/Jazz (NSS 250).
