= Honda Big Ruckus =

Honda motorcycle

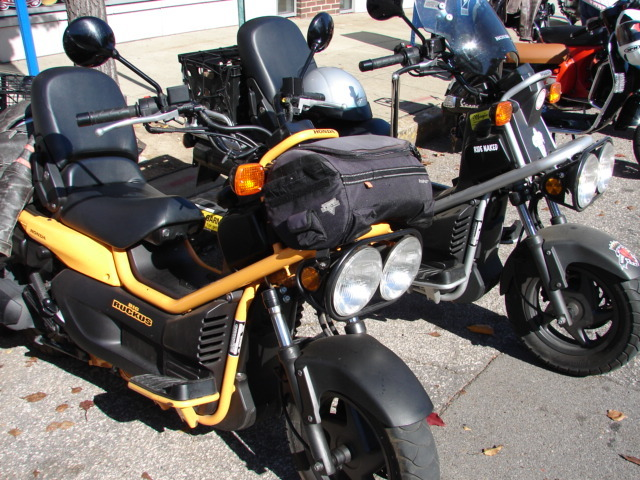
- Manufacturer: Honda Motor Company
- Also called: PS250, MF09-BA
- Production: 2004-2007
- Engine: MF04E 249 cc OHC single-cylinder four-stroke liquid-cooled
- Power: 19 hp @ 7,000 rpm
- Torque: 15.2 pound-feet (2.1 kg-m) @ 5,500rpm
- Transmission: Continuously Variable Transmission
- Tires: front 110/90-12, rear 130/70-12
- Wheelbase: 1.455 m
- Dimensions: L: 2.085 m W: 0.795 m H: 1.090 m
- Seat height: 0.725 metres (28.5 in)
- Weight: 160 kilograms (350 lb) (dry); 172 kilograms (379 lb) (wet)
- Fuel capacity: 12 litres (3.2 US gal)
- Oil capacity: 1qt
- Fuel consumption: 37.2 kilometres per litre (87 mpg_{‑US}) @ 60 km/h
- Turning radius: 2.3 m
- Related: Honda Foresight

The Big Ruckus PS250 is a 250cc, CVT transmission-equipped two-seater scooter, manufactured by Honda; marketed in Japan for model years 2004-2007 and in North America for model years 2005-2006 — and noted for its minimal bodywork and expressed light-weight steel tubular frame, akin to the Honda Zoomer.

== Styling ==
Noted for its minimalist styling, the scooter features an expressed painted tubular steel frame (e.g., yellow or silver) with contrasting (black) plastic infill panels and two prominent 7" headlights. While Motorcyclist said it had "rugged style," and Motorcycle.com said it had "a hairy chest," Canadian Motorcycle Guide said the bike had "bizarre, naked styling, and big-googly eyes and the Los Angeles Times said "to some people it might look like a rabbit carcass after a hawk has had its way."

Honda described the target market for the Big Ruckus as ranging "from urban deliveries (that's Pizza), to the back of motor-homes, to the entry/commuter/female rider or just as a cottage runabout."

== Design ==
The water-cooled 249 cc engine features an aluminum cylinder head with a compression ratio of 10.5:1; fan-cooled radiator; 30 mm carburetor; auto enriching system (i.e., no choke); electric start; fully transistorized ignition and air injection emissions system.

The Big Ruckus features seating for two; fold up pillion to provide a solo-rider backrest (fully down or fully up at 75 degrees); fore and aft sliding seat; cast aluminum wheels; hand-lever cable operated parking brake; side-mounted storage canister; tubular side grab handles/tie-down hooks; tubular front cargo area; center as well as side stand; twin front headlights; folding passenger footrest and forward mounted foot rests "similar to those on most cruiser style motorcycles;" and linked brake system, where the rear lever also actuates the front brakes (with the right-hand lever only operating the front brake while the left does both front and rear). The expressed tubular frame design offers no wind protection.

Marketed in North America at a MSRP of $5500, the bike's instrumentation includes trip odometer, analog speedometer, indicator lights for oil temperature and parking brake and fuel gauge, as well as visible as well as audible turn signals.

== Reception ==
A 2005 review in Cycle World magazine said "what the Big Ruckus lacks in torque it makes up in fun," adding "the seat is all-day comfy and the flip up backrest is a hoot." The review noted the scooter had poor brakes and a rough ride.

In a 2006 review, Motorcycle.com described the Big Ruckus, saying "the riding position and overall feeling that the bike conveys is more closely related to a big cruising motorcycle than a conventional scooter."
