= Honda CN250 =

Honda heilx 250 1998 Scooter

CN250
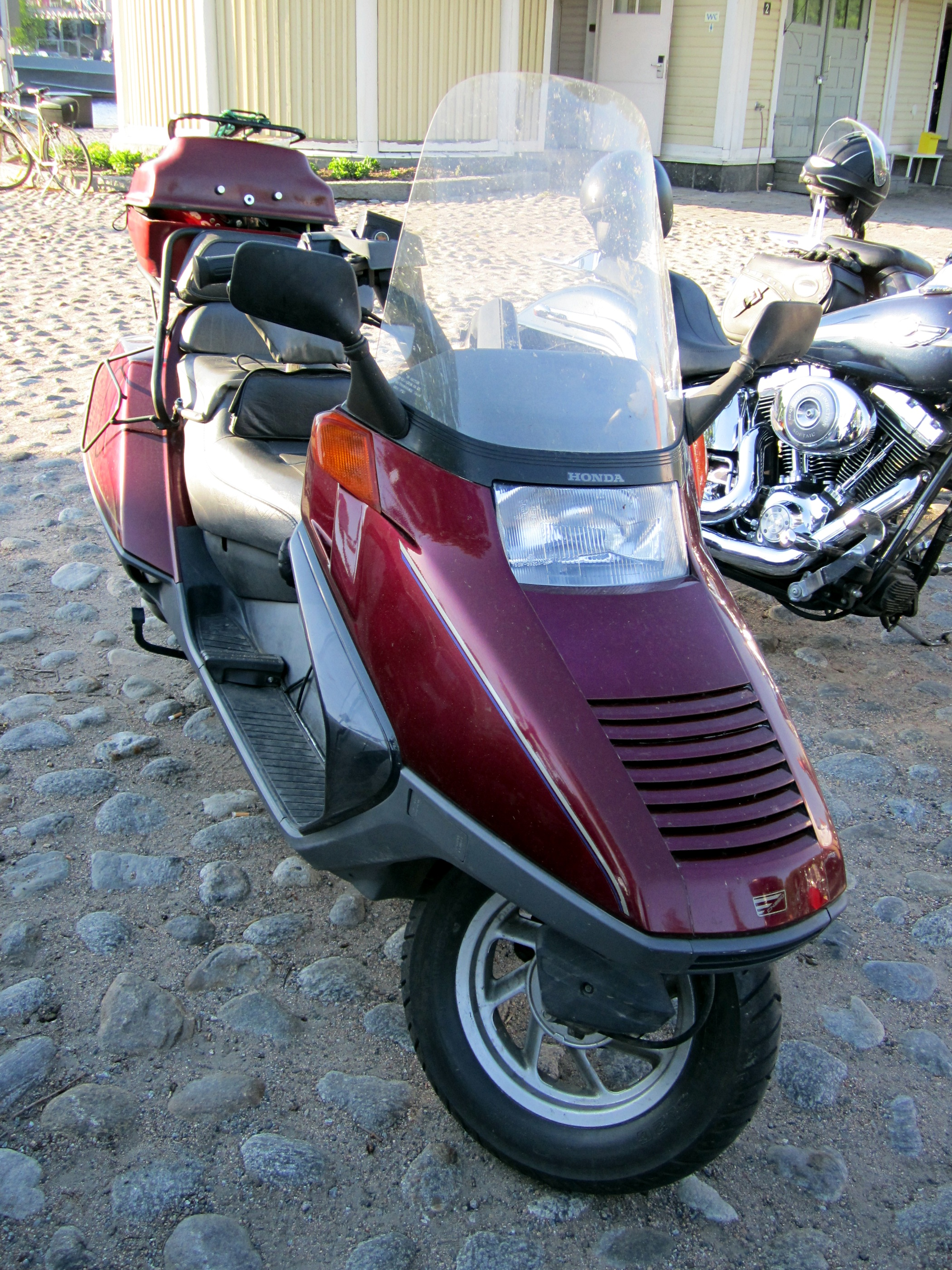
- Manufacturer: Honda
- Also called: Helix, Fusion, Spazio
- Production: 1986-2007
- Predecessor: Honda CH250 Elite 250
- Class: Maxi-scooter
- Engine: 244 cc (14.9 cu in) liquid-cooled SOHC single
- Transmission: V-Matic continuously variable transmission
- Suspension: Front: trailing link fork Rear: swingarm
- Brakes: Front: disc Rear: drum
- Tires: Front: 110/100-12; Rear: 120/90-10
- Rake, trail: 28°_90 mm (3.5 in)
- Wheelbase: 1,625 mm (64.0 in)
- Dimensions: L: 2,265 mm (89.2 in); W: 745 mm (29.3 in); H: 1,355 mm (53.3 in)
- Seat height: 665 mm (26.2 in)
- Weight: 157 kg (346 lb) (dry)
- Fuel capacity: 12 L (2.6 imp gal; 3.2 US gal)

The CN250 is a scooter introduced by Honda in 1986. It was marketed worldwide as the Spazio, except in native Japan (Fusion) and in the US / Canada (Helix).

== Background ==
In the early 1980s, Honda introduced a line of scooters known as the CH series, comprising the CH50, 80, 125, 150, and 250 models. In the US, these were known as "Elite" scooters but overseas they were marketed under the "Spacy" name. The CH250 could reach highway speeds and be used for long-range touring.

Honda then introduced the CN250 or Helix. This model lengthened the CH250 by 14 inches (360 mm), placed an integrated trunk in the rear of the machine and lowered the seat. The added length allowed a feet forward seating position and a smoother ride than that of previous models. The top speed of the machine was limited to 70-75 mph (about 113–121 km/h) but the drivetrain was of an under-stressed design allowing extended running at or near top speed.

== History ==
The Fusion CN250 found instant popularity in Japan. In Europe, the Japanese put Italian makers under pressure to improve their scooters' capabilities and reliability. In the U.S., the Helix was a hit with middle-aged and older people. The Helix attracted customers that desired long-range touring capabilities, but did not want to shift, were unable to shift, or did not want a large, heavy conventional motorcycle. The CN250 was a capable machine complete with trip odometer, fuel and temperature gauges, glove compartment, and trunk.

The Helix was in its last year in 2001 and was to be replaced by the NSS250. The NSS250 was marketed in the U.S. as the Reflex and in other countries as the Forza. The Reflex handled better and had a higher top speed than the Helix, but some Helix fans argued that there was a trade-off in seating comfort and ride. In the Japanese market the Helix had an aftermarket and cult following with the younger generation, not unlike sport bikes in America. Honda returned the CN250 (Helix) to all markets in 2004 as the customer base was still there. In the U.S., the Helix and the Reflex were discontinued with the 2007 model.

== Versions and variations ==
Honda made very few changes to the Helix through its 20-year run. Aluminum rims replaced steel wheels in the early 90s, and a few emission controls were added to the engine. Apart from those changes, the machine stayed the same right down to its 1980s-style, multi-colored digital gauges.

The CN250 was also manufactured and sold within Canada as the "Helix" as the first "maxiscooter" of its kind to be offered in that country. However, production within Canada was halted after the initial production year of 1986. Canadian citizens could still purchase a Helix as an import from the U.S., and a majority of Honda dealerships in Canada did not even stock a "floor model" for display. Additionally, the purchaser will often be required to pay or finance upfront for their purchase, sight unseen.

It was the Japanese scooter "scene" that saved the Honda Helix/Fusion. Honda had intended to discontinue production in the late 1990s in favor of the "Reflex" and went so far as to cease production at one point. However, pressure from the members of Japan's now-outraged multitude of Fusion riding groups and modification enthusiasts pressured Honda into reinstating production with an announcement to that effect in February 2003, to begin production once again for the 2005 production year.
