= Honda CHF50 =

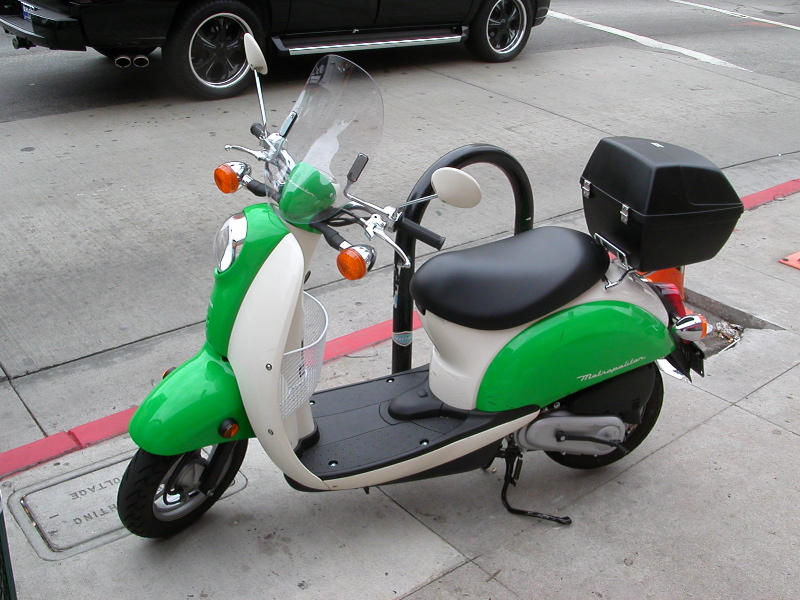
- Manufacturer: Honda
- Also called: Metropolitan, Scoopy, Jazz, Crea Scoopy
- Production: 2002–2009
- Successor: NCW50
- Class: Scooter
- Engine: 49 cc (3.0 cu in) liquid cooled 4-stroke single
- Ignition type: CDI
- Transmission: Continuously variable V-belt
- Suspension: Front: telescopic fork Rear: single shock
- Brakes: F/R: drum w/front combined braking system
- Tires: 90/90-10
- Dimensions: L: 1,705 mm (67.1 in); W: 625 mm (24.6 in); H: 1,000 mm (39 in)
- Fuel capacity: 5 L (1.1 imp gal; 1.3 US gal)
- Related: NPS50

The Honda CHF50 is a scooter made by Honda and marketed as the Metropolitan in the United States, the Jazz in Canada, the Scoopy in Australia and Asia, and the Crea Scoopy in Japan. Offered in the United States from 2002 to 2009, the Metropolitan was reintroduced in 2013 based on the fuel-injected and air-cooled NCH50 instead of the prior CHF50.

== Design concept ==
While the CHF50 is one of several 49 cc (3.0 cu in) scooters offered by Honda since the early 1960s, it is notable for its "classic" Vespa-inspired styling and modern mechanical parts.

The CHF50 has a lockable center compartment below the seat which can hold a helmet (though not a full-face one). Inside the compartment is a handle to lock the center stand, making it more difficult to roll away. The CHF50 shares similar motor and drivetrain components with the Honda NPS50.
