= Honda Pantheon =

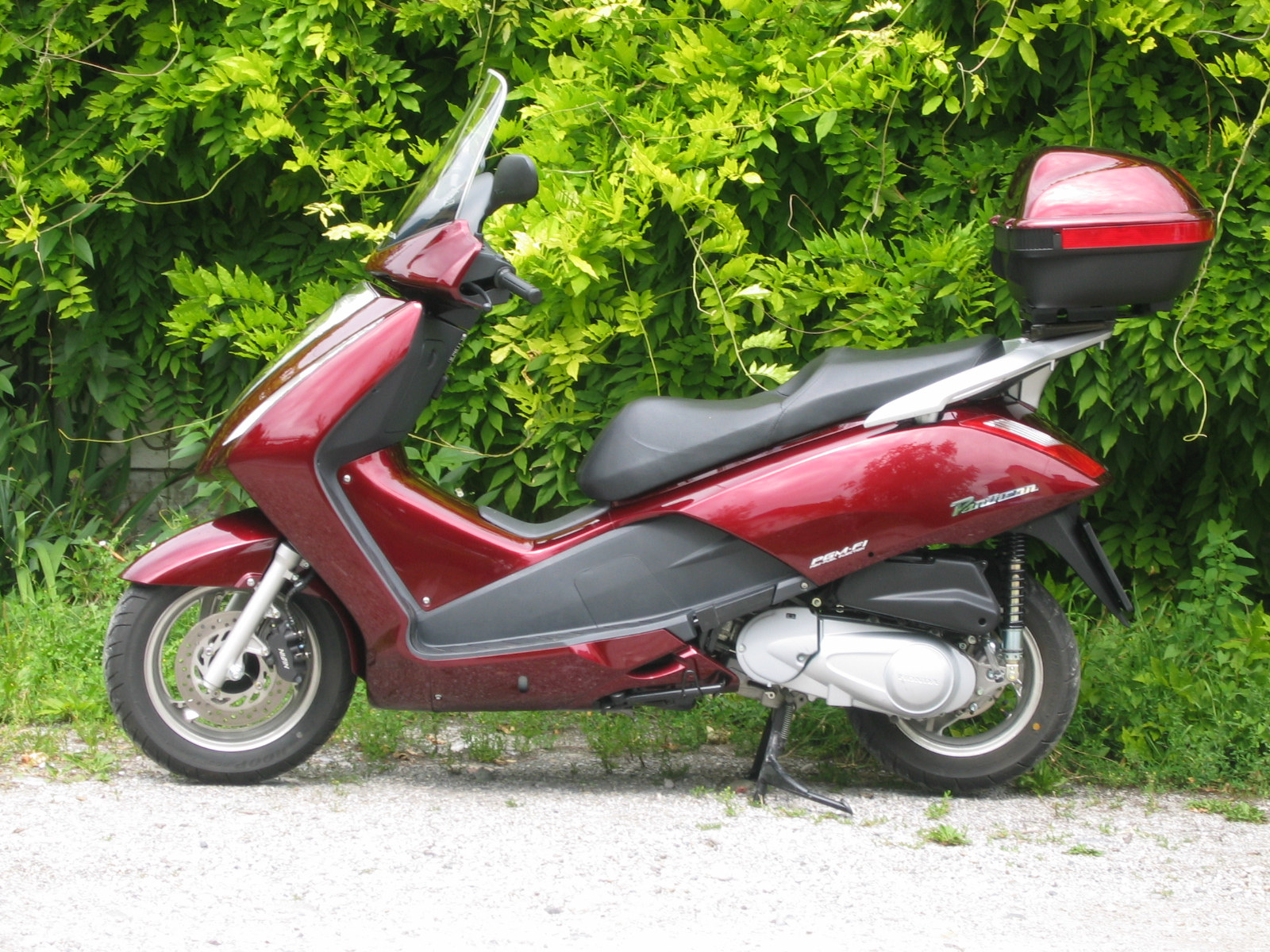
- Pantheon (FES 125) second generation
- Manufacturer: Honda
- Also called: Honda FES 125; Honda FES 150
- Production: 1998-2008
- Assembly: Atessa, Italy
- Successor: Honda S-Wing
- Engine: 124.6 cc (7.60 cu in) OHC single
- Bore / stroke: 54.0 mm × 54.5 mm (2.13 in × 2.15 in)
- Compression ratio: 11:1
- Ignition type: Capacitor discharge electronic ignition. electric start
- Transmission: Variable speed automatic belt final drive
- Suspension: Telescopic front Swingarm rear
- Brakes: Disc front Drum / disc rear
- Tires: 110/90 x 12 front 130/70 x 12 rear
- Wheelbase: 1.450 m (57.1 in)
- Weight: 149 kg (328 lb) (dry)
- Fuel capacity: 9.5 L (2.1 imp gal; 2.5 US gal)
- Related: Honda Foresight

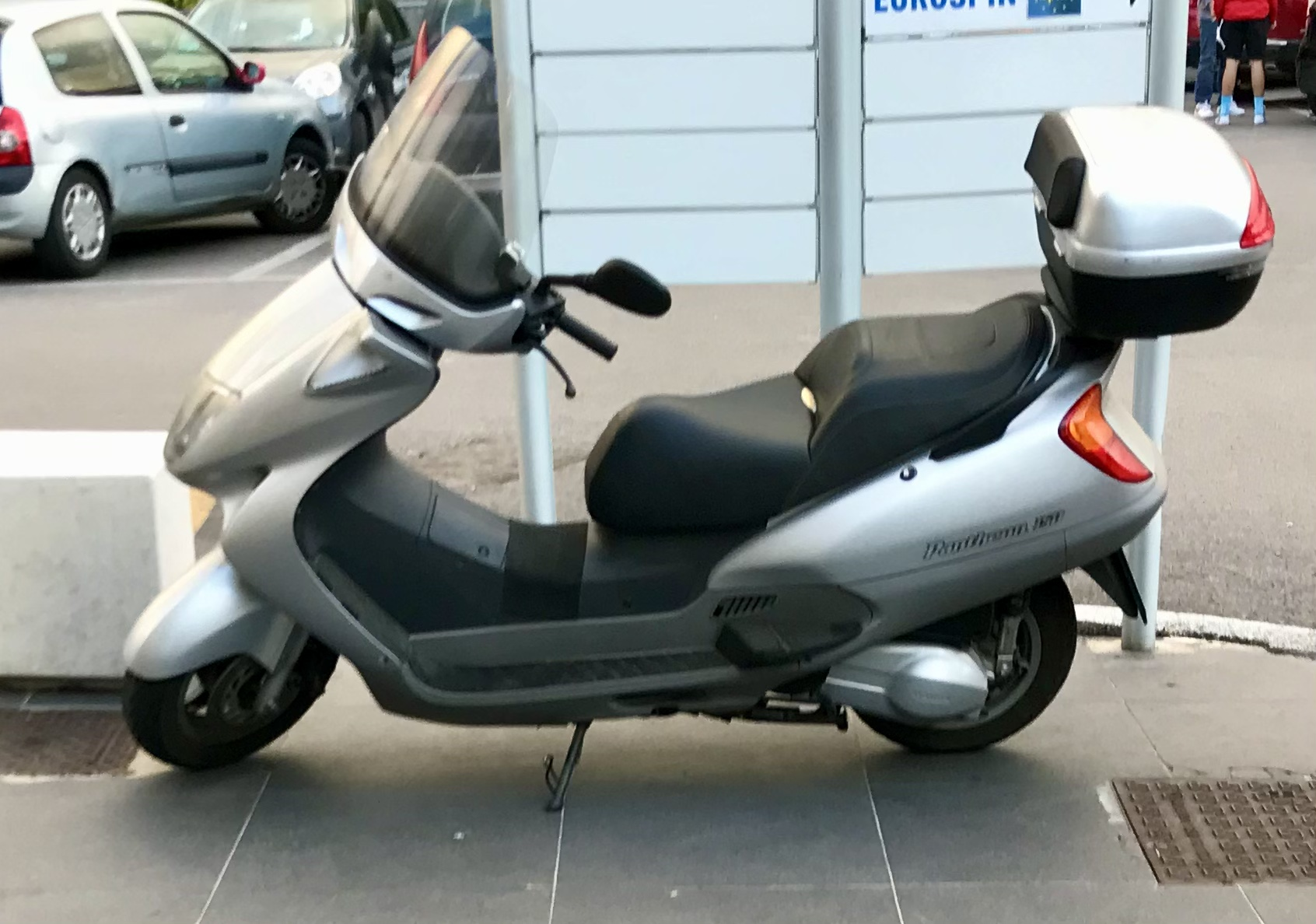
Pantheon (FES 150) first generation

The Honda Pantheon is a scooter, manufactured by Honda in the Italian factories of Honda Italia Industriale S.p.A in Atessa.

== History ==
=== First generation (1998-2002) ===
Presented in June 1998, the Pantheon (also called with the chassis code Honda FES 125 or Honda FES 150 depending on the engine) was the twin of the Honda Foresight 250 (FES 250) but unlike the latter it was available with smaller 125 or 150 cm^{3} two-stroke Euro 1 approved engines thanks to the standard ACR catalyst. Production took place at the Honda Italian plant in Atessa. 70% of the components are produced in Italy.

The 125 engine delivers 14.7 hp (10.8 kW) at 9,000 rpm and a maximum torque of 15 Nm at 6,500 rpm. The 150 engine delivers 16.9 hp (12.4 kW) at 7,000 rpm and peak torque of 17.3 Nm at 7,500 rpm.

At the beginning of 2000 it was one of the best-selling scooters in Italy.

=== Second generation (2003-2008) ===
The second generation was presented at the Bologna Motor Show in December 2002 and went on sale in the first months of 2003; this model maintains the frame of the previous series but has a totally new design much more streamlined characterized by the "V-style" front with the large V-shaped headlight, while at the rear it has headlights similar in style to those of the Silver Wing maxiscooter. Production takes place at the Honda Italia plant in Atessa.

The engine range consists of the new single-cylinder 125 cc and 150 cc four-stroke engines with two-valve distribution with single overhead shaft. The SOHC type engines, with PGM-FI electronic injection and liquid cooling, have the HECS3 catalytic converter system (Honda catalytic converter) and are Euro 2 approved. The engine power is transmitted to the rear wheel via a centrifugal clutch and a transmission. continuously variable V-belt. The 125 delivers 13.8 hp at 9,000 rpm and maximum torque of 11.7 Nm at 8,500 rpm. The 150 delivers 15.9 hp (11.7 kW) at 9,000 rpm and maximum torque of 14.2 Nm at 8,500 rpm.

The components include a fork with 33 mm stanchions and double shock absorber at the rear. At the front there is a 110-90 13-inch diameter wheel; at the rear there is a 12-inch 130-70 wheel. The braking system consists of a 240 mm hydraulic disc with three-piston caliper at the front, and a 220 mm hydraulic disc with single-piston caliper at the rear.
