= Honda S-Wing =

- Manufacturer: Honda
- Also called: FES125-7
- Production: 2007–2015
- Predecessor: Honda Pantheon
- Successor: Honda Forza 125
- Engine: 125 cc (7.6 cu in) and 150 cc (9.2 cu in)

The S-Wing is a scooter made by Honda. The S-wing (Silverwing) model was introduced in 2007 and replaced the Honda Pantheon scooter which was discontinued. Officially it is known as the FES125-7, and the Pantheon was the FES125-6. There are two engine sizes available in different markets, in 125 cc (7.6 cu in) and 150 cc (9.2 cu in) versions, and ABS is also available in some markets.

The S-Wing has a different engine specification from the Pantheon engine in order to allow for Euro3 emission regulations. This is basically the same engine as fitted to other Honda scooters, including the PS125i and the SH125i. The S-wing sits marginally above these two scooters in terms of finish levels and price.

A large screen, side stand, and centre stand come as standard. The scooter gauges also include a fuel meter which measures kilometres/miles per litre.

The S-Wing is made in Atessa (Italy) for the European market, and is not available in Honda's home country (Japan).

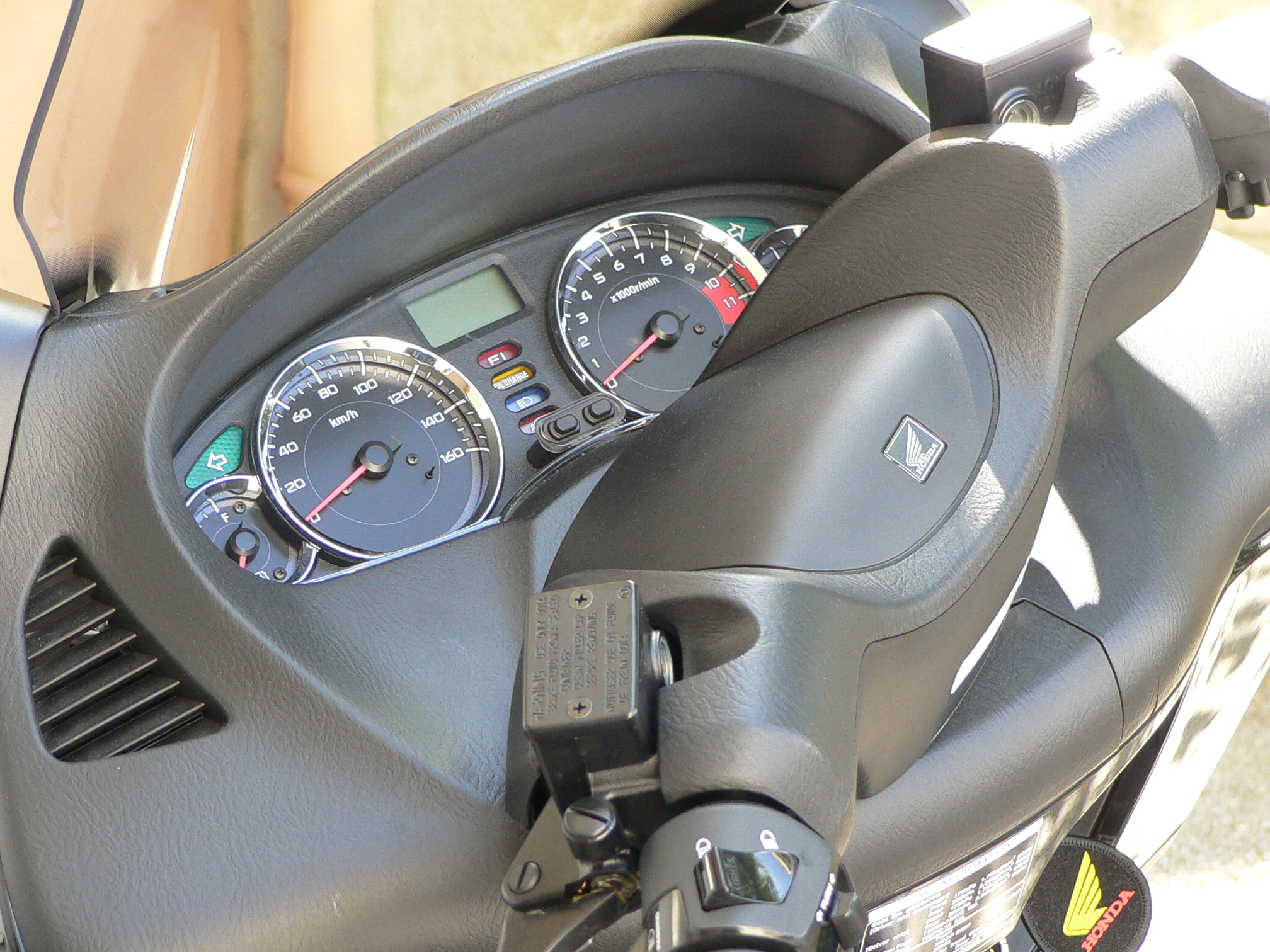

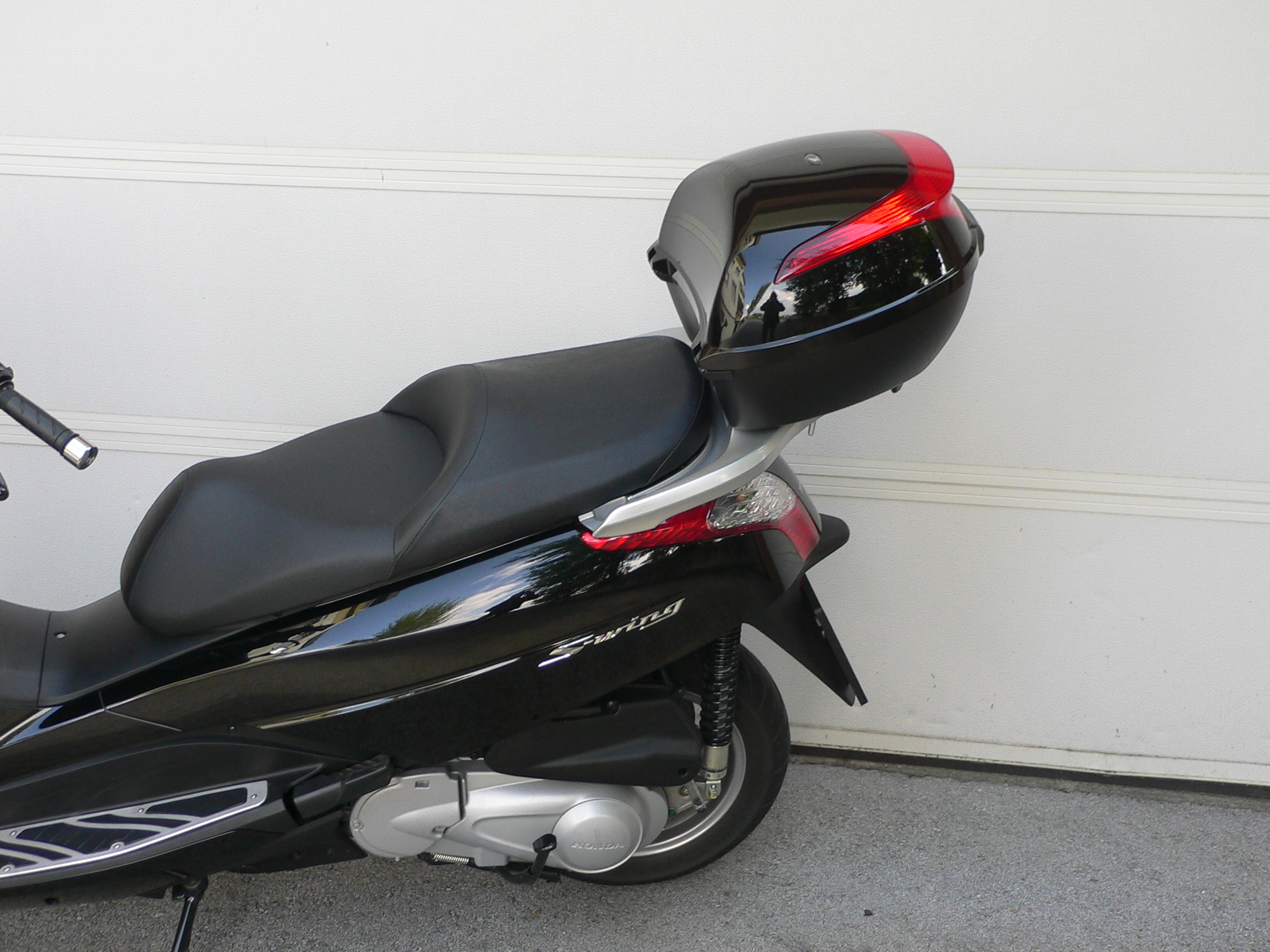
