= Suitcase Cycle =

- Production: 1967–74
- Class: Step-through
- Engine: 4-stroke air-cooled single

The Suitcase Cycle was a small step-through motorcycle modification, designed by Lawrence Shapiro, for quick breakdown and compact transport via general aviation (GA) aircraft, as well as land and sea transport. Most commonly, Honda CT90 trail bikes were converted, although several other motorbikes models were as well.

== Design ==
An airline captain for United Airlines, Lawrence “Larry” S. Shapiro, recognized the need for small, lightweight, transportation. Using a stock Honda Trail 90, he began work on modifying it so that it could be disassembled or collapsed down to a small size that could fit in most aircraft luggage compartments. The ability to do this without requiring tools was seen as a must. The final version had 90 custom parts.

The design was awarded a United States Patent, #3,872,944, in 1975.

At peak manufacturing, Suitcase Cycle production models included the Suzuki 100cc, 125cc and the freeway legal 185cc model. Honda models included the CT90, CL100, and SL125 models, another an instance of a converted Honda 175cc model, and a Yamaha 360cc has been reported.

The company also sold storage and safety accessories, like hard sided luggage, vinyl soft cases, and helmets.

== Production & Marketing ==
Suitcase Cycle started in the garage at Shapiro family home in Westchester, California, in the late 1960s. Shortly thereafter, production was expanded and moved to the Santa Monica Airport, where a dozen employees - including Shapiro's family - worked.

The Suitcase Cycle appeared in several feature articles in aviation magazine during its production run, as well as advertisements.

Over 1,000 Suitcase Cycles were completed when the production came to a sudden halt in 1974.

== End of Production ==
A shift in product liability laws compelled Shapiro to shutter the production line in 1974. Several of dealers that Suitcase Cycle got their motorbikes from were instructed to no longer sell to Suitcase Cycle bikes for conversion.

Larry Shapiro retired from United Airlines, and died in 2001.

Today, factory-built Suitcase Cycles, with complete badging and documentation, command premium prices among GA pilots and Honda collectors alike.
