= Honda Zoomer =

Zoomer
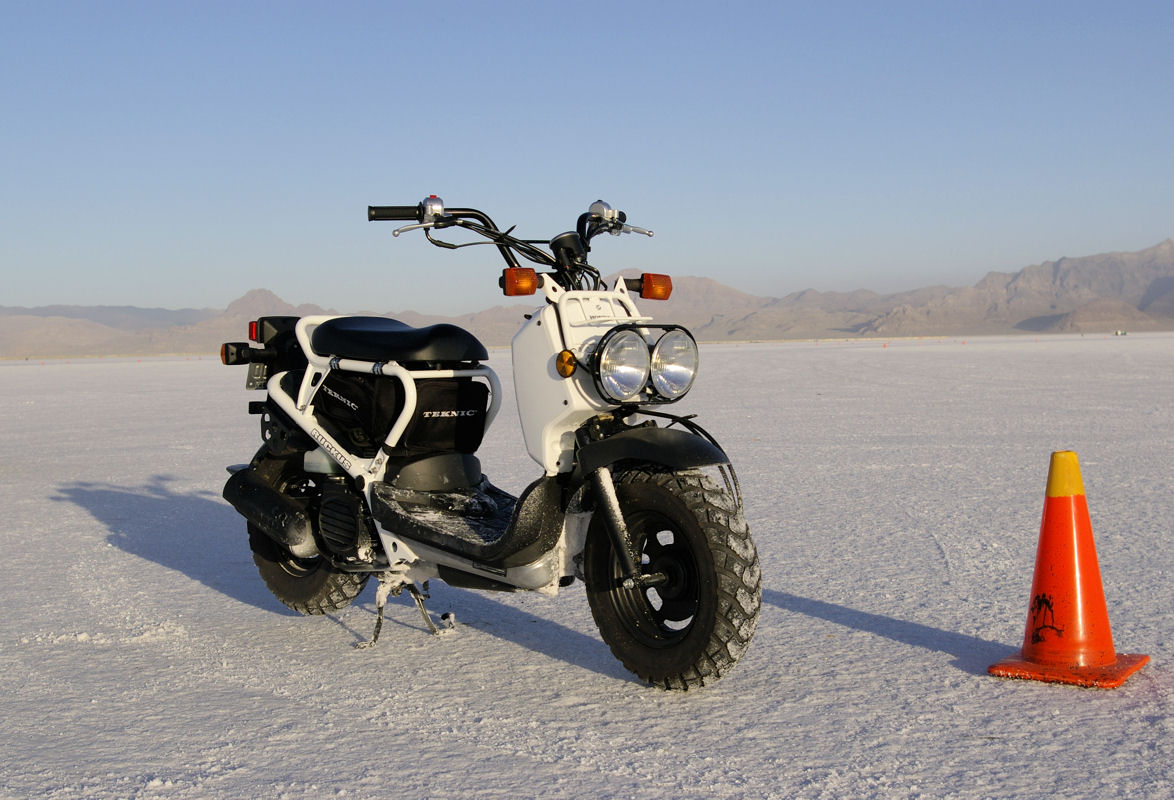
- Manufacturer: Honda
- Also called: Honda Ruckus (NPS50)
- Production: 2002–
- Class: Scooter
- Engine: 49 cc (3.0 cu in), liquid-cooled, four-stroke, single
- Bore / stroke: 38 mm × 44 mm (1.5 in × 1.7 in)
- Compression ratio: 11.9:1
- Transmission: CVT
- Suspension: Front - telescopic forks, Rear - telescopic damper and spring
- Brakes: Drum brakes front and rear
- Tires: Front - 120/90 R10; Rear - 130/90 R10
- Wheelbase: 1,265 mm (49.8 in)
- Dimensions: L: 1,860 mm (73 in); W: 735 mm (28.9 in); H: 1,025 mm (40.4 in)
- Seat height: 735 mm (28.9 in)
- Fuel capacity: 5 L (1.1 imp gal; 1.3 US gal)
- Fuel consumption: 114 mpg_{‑US} (2 L/100 km; 137 mpg_{‑imp})
- Related: CHF50

The Zoomer, designation NPS50, is a scooter developed by Honda and introduced in Japan and North America in late 2002 for the 2003 model year. In Canada and the US, the scooter is marketed as the Ruckus. The Zoomer differs from more traditional scooters with its rugged design, including fatter tires with deeper tread and a skeletal frame lacking an enclosed storage compartment. The NPS50 shares similar motor and drivetrain components with the CHF50.

The Zoomer sold in European countries features a compact, single point programmed fuel injection (PGMFI) system, consisting of a single fuel injector, a different fuel pump arrangement, and an oxygen sensor fitted just before the exhaust silencer.

Honda claims that the Ruckus returns 114 miles per US gallon (2.06 L/100 km; 137 mpg_{‑imp}) in EPA tests.

== See also ==
- Honda Big Ruckus, or PS250, a 249 cc scooter
- Honda PCX for similarities in technology
