= Honda NSS250 =

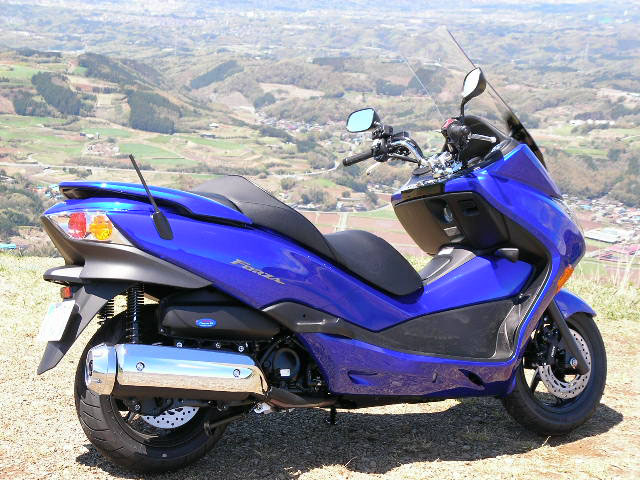
- Manufacturer: Honda
- Also called: Honda Reflex/ Honda Forza/ Honda Jazz
- Production: 2001–2008
- Predecessor: Honda Foresight
- Class: Scooter
- Engine: 249 cc (15.2 cu in), liquid-cooled, SOHC, single
- Top speed: 85 mph (137 km/h)
- Power: 19 hp (14.2 kW) @ 7500 rpm
- Torque: 21 N⋅m (15.5 ft⋅lbf) @ 5000 rpm
- Transmission: Continuously variable Automatic transmission
- Suspension: Front: 33 mm hydraulic fork Rear: single-side swingarm, dual hydraulic forks
- Brakes: Front: disc Rear: disc, optional ABS
- Tires: Front: 110/90-13; Rear: 130/70-12
- Wheelbase: 1,544 mm (60.8 in)
- Seat height: 719 mm (28.3 in)
- Weight: 170.1 kg (375 lb) (dry)
- Fuel capacity: 12.11 L (2.66 imp gal; 3.20 US gal)

The Honda NSS250 Forza (International), or Reflex (US) is a 249 cc (15.2 cu in) Honda maxi-scooter. It continued being produced as HONDA NSS300 Forza between 2013 and 2021 with ABS, receiving minor updates each year.

The Forza was updated in 2021 with a new 350cc (now 330cc, up from 279cc) single cylinder 4-stroke engine, which is shared with the SH 350 model.

== Production and model history ==
The Honda NSS250, marketed as the Honda Reflex in North America, was manufactured by Honda between 2001 and 2008. It was introduced as a mid-sized maxi-scooter aimed at urban commuters and light touring riders, succeeding the earlier Honda Helix (CN250). The NSS250 featured a 249 cc liquid-cooled, single-cylinder engine paired with a V-Matic automatic transmission. Early models were notable for offering an optional Anti-lock Braking System (ABS), which was uncommon in scooters at the time. In 2004, Honda introduced the Reflex Sport (NSS250S) and Reflex Sport ABS (NSS250SA) variants, featuring cosmetic updates such as a shorter windscreen, black wheels, and a modified seat with passenger backrest, while retaining the same mechanical specifications.
