= Honda CT110 =

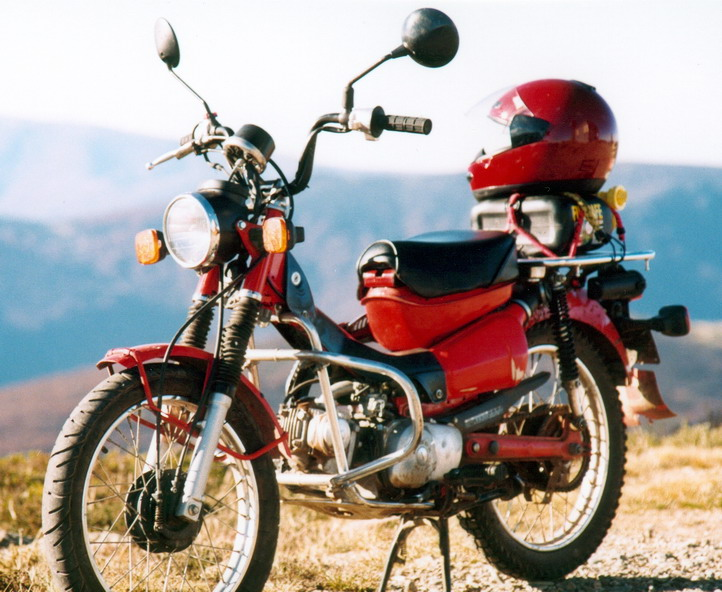
- Manufacturer: Honda
- Production: 1980–2013
- Assembly: Japan
- Class: Dual-sport motorcycle
- Engine: 105 cc (6.4 cu in), air-cooled 2 valve SOHC four-stroke single
- Bore / stroke: 52 mm × 50 mm (2.0 in × 2.0 in)
- Compression ratio: 8.5:1
- Ignition type: Contact breaker
- Transmission: Semi-Automatic Centrifugal clutch four-speed, with or without a dual range sub-transmission, chain drive
- Brakes: front & rear single drum
- Wheelbase: 122.0 cm (48.0 in)
- Dimensions: L: 190.5 cm (75.0 in); W: 75.5 cm (29.7 in); H: 106.0 cm (41.7 in)
- Seat height: 740 mm (29 in)
- Fuel capacity: 5.5 L (1.2 imp gal; 1.5 US gal)
- Turning radius: 1.8 m (5 ft 11 in)
- Related: Honda CT90 (predecessor)

The CT110 is a small dual-sport motorcycle made by Honda in Japan since 1980 and is sold in various parts of the world. The bike has sold well worldwide.

The CT110 replaced the CT90, which was essentially the same general design but with a smaller displacement engine and points ignition while the CT110 has solid state electronic ignition.

== Design ==
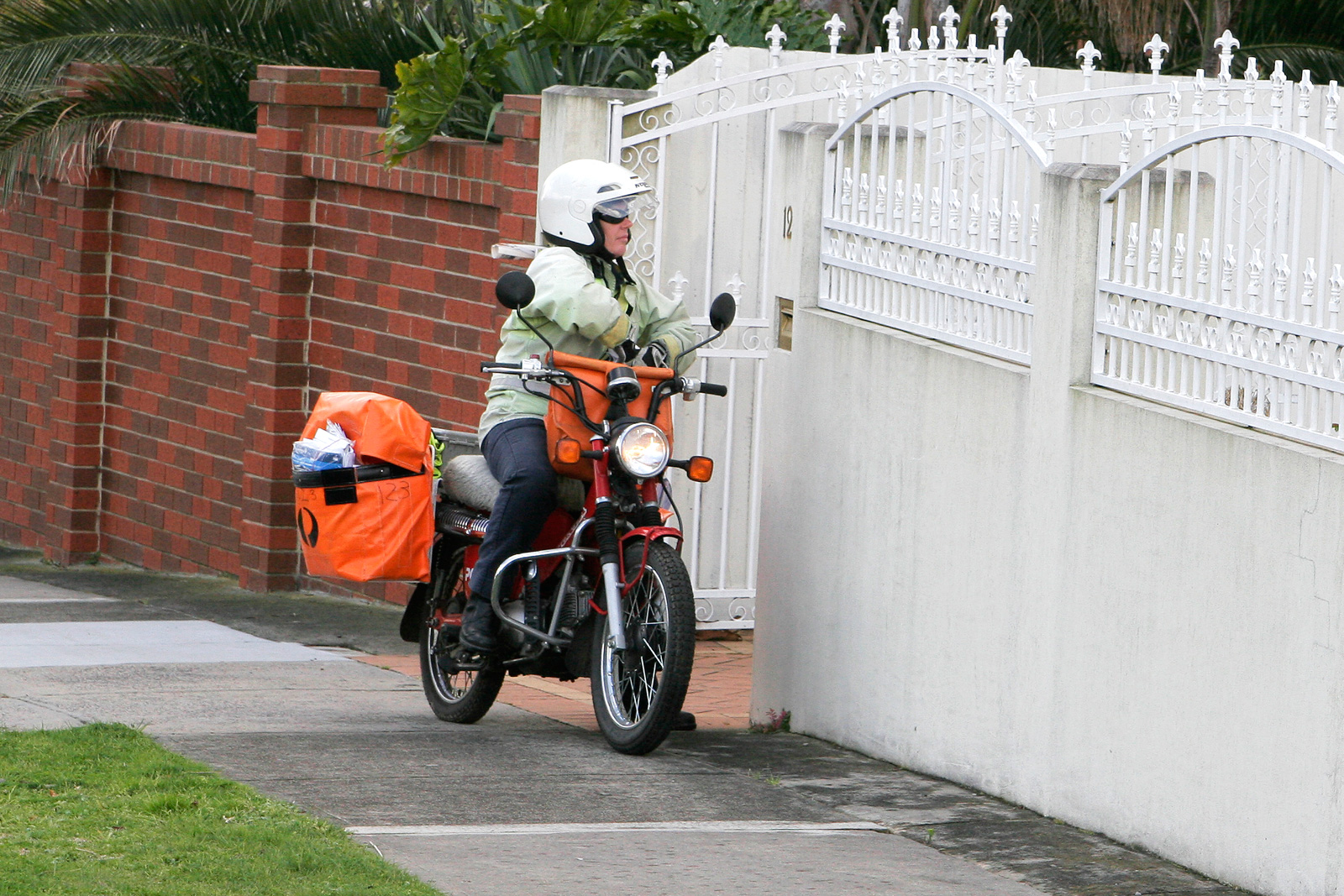
A Melbourne postman riding a CT110

An example of a racing CT110

The base CT110 105 cc (6.4 cu in) four-stroke air-cooled single-cylinder engine which is nearly horizontal in the step-through tube/stamping frame. It has a semi-automatic four-speed transmission and a centrifugal clutch. That coupled with a 2:1 ratio gear reduction box known as the dual range sub-transmission, which switched into operation using a small lever under the transmission case, allowed the bike to climb steep slopes.

== North America ==
In the US the CT110 came with factory street legal lighting and mirrors, a large luggage rack, center stand, and an auxiliary gas can. The 1980 model of CT110 lacked the dual range sub-transmission, but that returned in following years. The motorcycle was imported from 1980 to 1986.

== Australia and New Zealand ==
In Australia and New Zealand the Honda CT110 is known as a "Postie Bike" due to its longtime use by Australia Post and New Zealand Post as a delivery bike, without the dual range sub-transmission and upgraded to 12 volt ignition in 1998. The last CT110s were delivered to Australia Post in 2013, later replaced by the NBC110. From 2019 both the NBC110 and remaining CT110s began to be replaced with Kyburz electric tricycles.

After almost 30 years of only being available via second-hand sale from Australia Post in bulk lots, Honda began selling the road-registerable model to the domestic market in July 2009. These were the 6 volt dual transmission "AG" models. A slightly modified version, the CT110 AG, is also sold for agricultural use. This retains the dual range sub-transmission and is essentially the same as the North American versions retaining a 6 volt electrical system rather than 12 volt like the later Post Office bikes. For most of their production history the CT110AG lacked a compliance plate and so could not be registered for road use. This changed in 1998 and they were able to be registered until 2013 when production ceased.

== Tanzania ==
Large numbers of CT110 and CT90 models were also brought to Tanzania in east Africa, where many are still in use today. Among the original users was Danish aid organisation Danida. During the late 1970s and 1980s they were the standard issue motorcycle for volunteers.

== See also ==
- Honda CT series bikes: Trail Cub / Hunter Cub
