= Honda CT90 =

- Manufacturer: Honda
- Production: 1966–79
- Predecessor: CT200
- Successor: CT110
- Class: Step-through
- Engine: 89 cc 4-stroke air-cooled single
- Transmission: 4-speed, automatic clutch
- Frame type: Stamped steel
- Suspension: Leading link (1966–68) or telescoping fork (1969–79)
- Fuel consumption: c. 100 mpg_{‑US} (43 km/L)

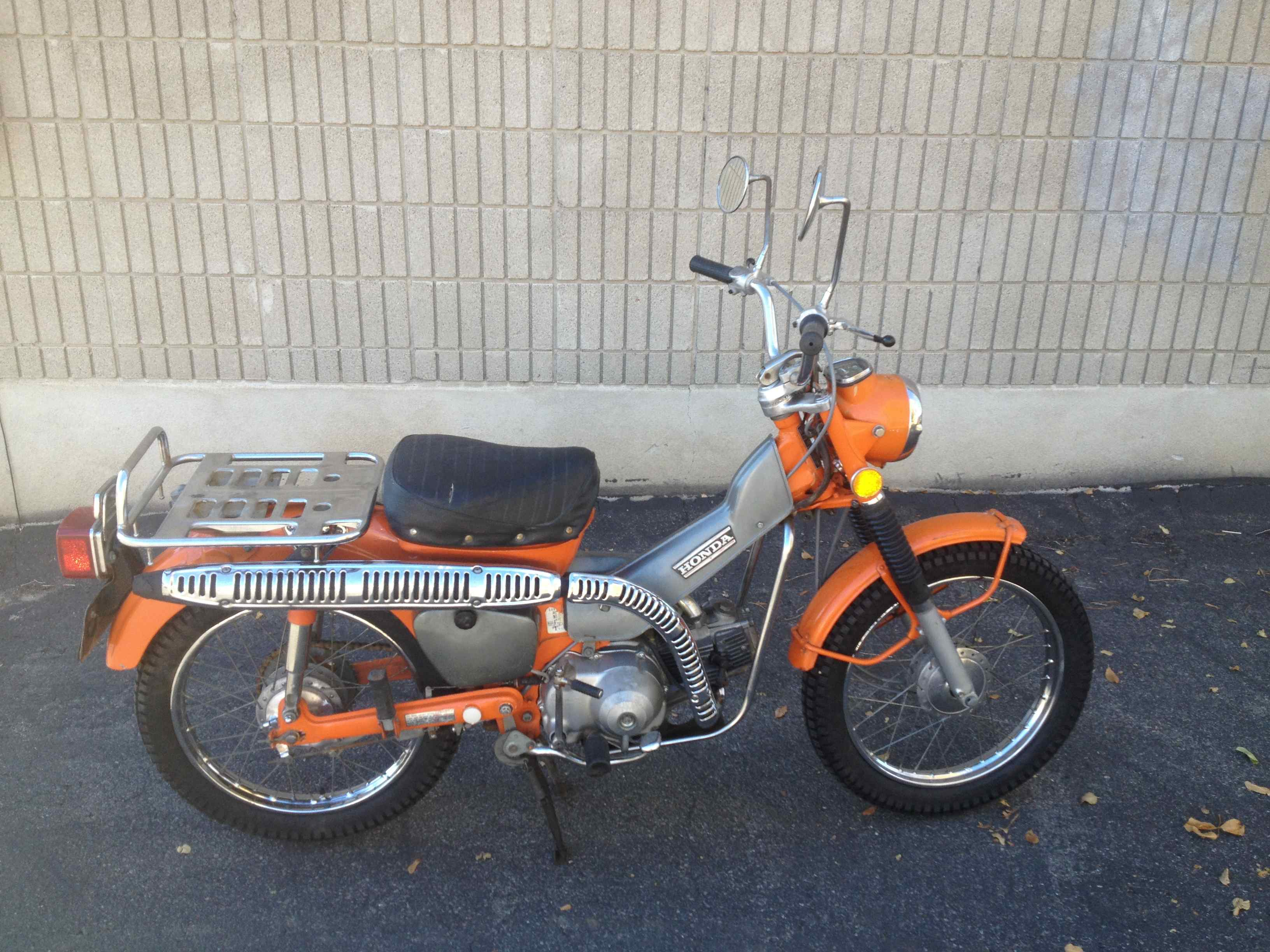
The 1972 trail 90 was the last year without factory installed turn signals.

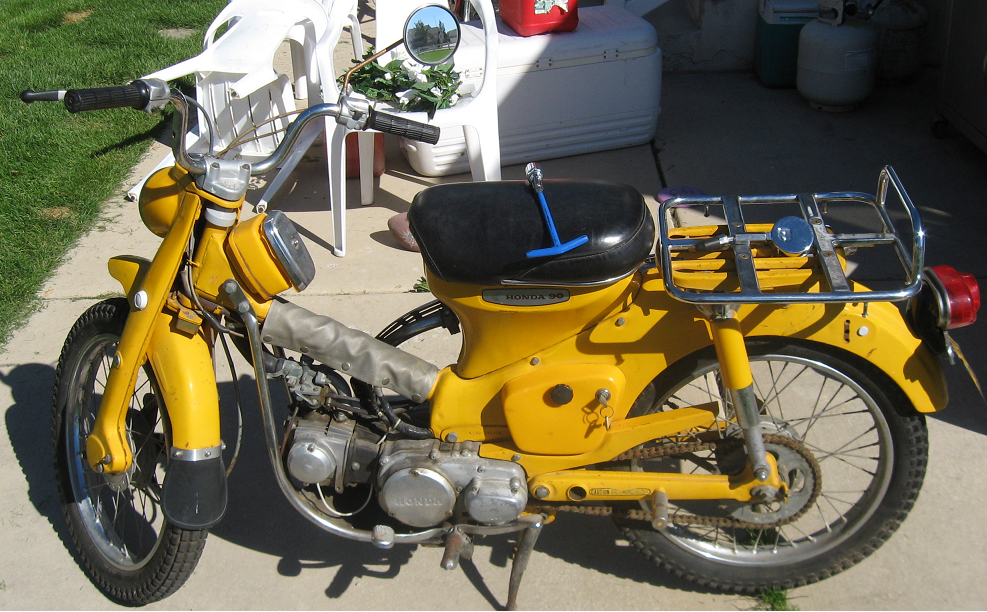
A 1968 Honda CT90

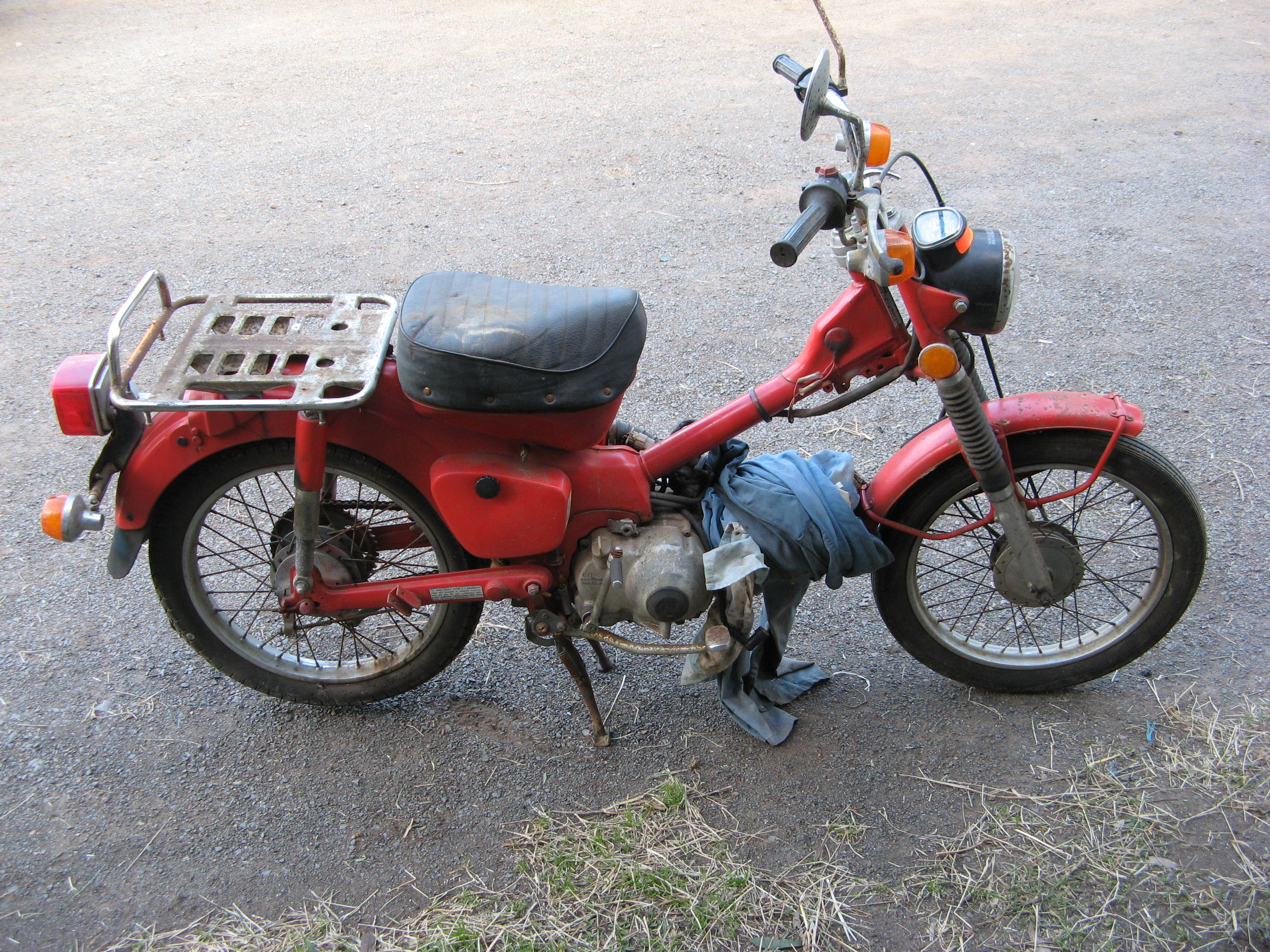
A 1976 Honda CT90

The Honda CT90 was a small step-through motorcycle manufactured by Honda from 1966 to 1979. It was offered in two models: Trail or X with the main variations being gear ratios and tyre style.

== Predecessors and early models ==
The CT90 Trail 90 was preceded by the CT200 Trail 90 (1964–1966), which featured a similar design, and was itself preceded by dealer-level modifications to the 49cc Super Cub, the CA100T Trail 50 and the C105T Trail 55. The CT200 had an 87 cc (5.3 cu in) iron-head pushrod OHV engine, instead of the CT90's 89 cc (5.4 cu in) aluminum head OHC, with a carburetor to match. Except for the engine change, the 1966 models of CT200 and CT90 were the same—the change in model number reflected a new Honda policy that model numbers would indicate engine-size class.

The CT200 and 1966 CT90 had a dual rear sprocket, which created a lower gear range for heavy weight or steep terrain. To shift to the low range, the operator had to stop and clip a short additional section onto the chain, which then would allow it to go around the larger rear sprocket. Starting in August 1967, this cumbersome arrangement was replaced by a two-range sub-transmission, which could be set far more easily by simply moving a small lever while the bike was in neutral and idling.

== 1969–1970 Design Updates ==
While the earlier Honda Trail series had been slightly modified versions of the Super Cub, 1969 and 1970 brought an evolution to the CT90 which tailored it more to the needs of the off-road rider. Now, the Trail 90 was a unique and separate platform, not merely a variation on the city-commuter theme.

The greatest change was in 1969, when Honda replaced the Super-Cub-style cantilever-toggle front end with telescoping-tube similar to those found on most motorcycles. This increased travel (and shock absorption) on the front wheel.

The large, chrome rear cargo rack which had been an option now became a standard item. No longer being attached to the small, stamped-steel rack inherited from the Super Cub, the new rack had its own dedicated mounting system, which was strong enough to use for lifting the motorcycle.

The other obvious change in the 1969 model was the addition of a hard plastic downtube cover, designed specifically for the CT90. Earlier models had retained the Super Cub's air filter box, located on the downtube, and with the removal of the wide shield of the street model, a fabric cover had been used. The new cover would run from the head tube to the bottom of the downtube, providing protection to the carburetor, and the air filter was now located in a plastic box attached to the side of the frame.

In 1970, a lever was added to the front end, which made it easy and simple to rotate the handlebars. This feature made it more convenient to store the motorcycle, or to carry it in a rack, truck bed, or even the back of a station wagon. Fold-down handlebars had been introduced on the Honda Z50A Mini Trail in 1968, and had proven popular among owners with space constraints. Though this feature would eventually be dropped from the Mini Trail, the easy-swivel handlebars would be one of the definitive features of the full-size Honda Trail series throughout the rest of production.

These were the last major changes made to the "Trail 90," and the only other noteworthy change to the Honda Trail bikes came with the change to the 110cc engine in 1980.

== Market ==
Honda targeted hunters, fishermen, commuters, and outdoorsmen with the Trail 90. Early ads often had these bikes in wilderness settings. They were well suited to narrow trails, being small and lightweight (around 188 lb (85 kg)) and with a forgiving suspension. The bike was ideal for climbing and carrying packs. The four-stroke engine was quiet and almost all models were equipped with spark-arrestor exhausts.

While targeted at off-road users, this was not a dirt bike in the conventional sense. It could be registered for road use, having a top speed in high-ratio road gear of around 55 mph (89 km/h). Fuel economy was excellent, often around and above 100 mpg (2½ L/100km). In local commuter traffic, it was extremely maneuverable, although it was poorly suited for highway travel because of limited power, off-road-biased tyres, and top speed.

Trail 90s were also modified, by aftermarket vendor Suitcase Cycle, for quick breakdown and compact transport via general aviation aircraft.

== Design ==
The CT90 in its classic form was an 89 cc (5.4 cu in) 4-stroke air-cooled single with a four-speed transmission and a semi-automatic clutch, coupled with a 1.866:1 ratio reduction box that was manually switched into operation using a small lever under the transmission case. The cylinder was nearly horizontal in the step-through tube/stamping frame. The fork was originally a bottom link suspension, replaced in 1969 with conventional telescoping-tube suspension.

== Successor ==
The CT90 ended production in 1979, replaced the following year by the CT110. The CT110 was the same machine but bored out to 105 cc (6.4 cu in) and weighs slightly more. The 1980 CT110 lacked the reduction box; however, it returned in following years. The 2020 Honda CT125 Hunter Cub is a spiritual successor.

== See also ==
- Honda CT series bikes: Trail Cub/Hunter Cub
