= Honda CT series =

Type of motorcycle

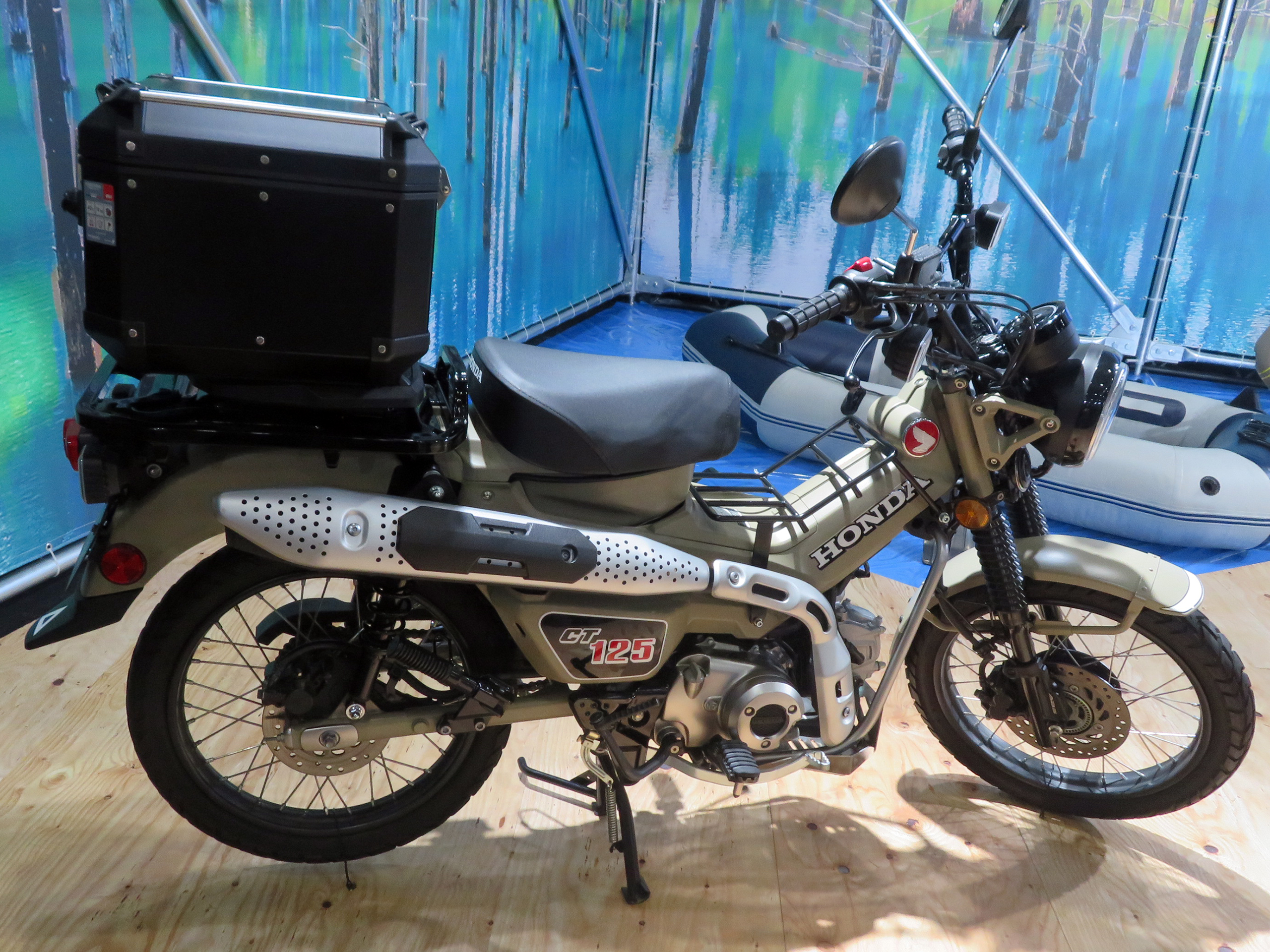
A 2022 CT125 Hunter Cub shown with accessories like a large rear luggage container

The Honda CT series was a group of Honda trail bike motorcycles made since 1964 and still produced as of 2026. The CT designation is a slight exception in Honda nomenclature in that "CT" does not indicate a series of mechanically related bikes, but rather a group of different bikes that are all for casual off-road use, as well as being licensable in most models for street use.

== Overview ==
A description of the CT-series is necessarily convoluted because it spans several decades during which Honda altered its naming system, re-used previously issued CT designations, assigned different model names for different markets, and sometimes used multiple names for the same model within single markets. The most commonly used nomenclature is the name "Trail" being followed by the engine displacement class; thus, several different models bore the "Trail 90" designation, over a 20-year period (making this, collectively, the most popular series). Not surprisingly, the assumption is often made that any of the full-sized CT series is a "Trail 90" when first observed.

The CT designation has been used for the Trail Cub series of bikes since 1964. Alongside, a ST-series bike was renamed CT70 for the Canadian and US market from 1969 to 1994 (to further confuse the issue, both the CT70 and Z50 series were dubbed "Mini Trail," again followed by the displacement class). Honda also uses the CT designation to cover an Australia-only series of "farm bikes" for agricultural work. In 1981 Honda released a CT250S Silk Road "trekking bike", and in 1983 a Japan-only CT50 Motra minibike. These last two vehicles are mechanically unrelated to other CT-series bikes, and each other.

== Trail Cub/Hunter Cub ==
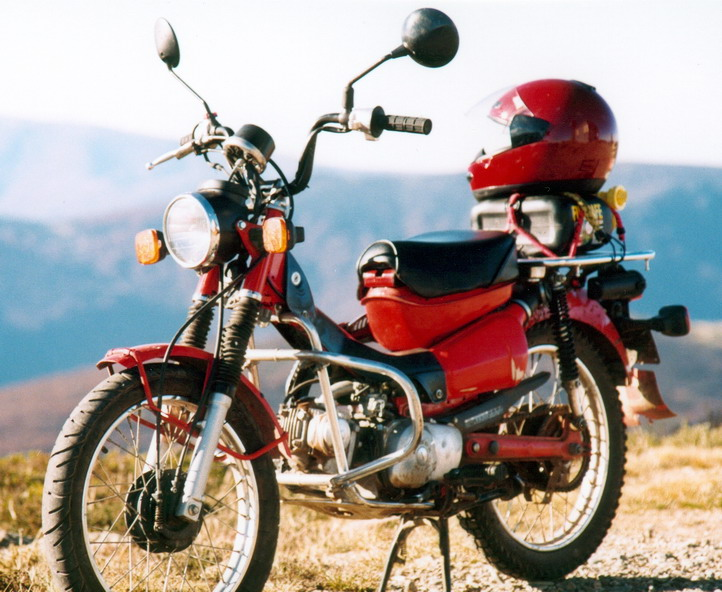
Australian CT110 "Postie Bike"

The Trail Cub series is an offshoot of the popular Super Cub line, and the bikes are known by several names. In Japan they were introduced as the Hunter Cub, while in the Canada/US market they were called the Trail Cub or just "Trail" followed by a number indicating engine size, such as "Trail 90". Individual models may also be known by model number, such as CT90 and CT110. In Australia the CT110 has acquired the popular moniker "Postie Bike" due to its long association with the Australia Post.

These small 17" wheel bikes are intended for relatively slow off-road travel. They have 4-stroke engines ranging from 49 cc to 105 cc, and automatic clutches. All bikes have either 3- or 4-speed transmissions, plus a second choice of HIGH or LOW bands to apply the same gears to road travel or slower off-road travel. The early bikes achieved this by having two drive sprockets at the rear wheel, which required the rider to dismount and thread the chain onto the desired sprocket. Later bikes placed the two-stage choice within the gearbox, and required the rider to only move a lever.

=== 1960–1962 C100H/C100T/CA100T "Trail 50" ===
1961 Honda C100H Hunter Cub
- Predecessor: none
- Engine: 49 cc OHV 4-stroke
- Transmission: 3-speed + stepped chainring, automatic clutch

1962 Honda CA100T Trail 50
- Engine: 49 cc OHV 4-stroke
- Power: 5 hp @ 9,500 rpm
- Transmission: 3-speed + stepped chainring, automatic clutch
- Tires: 2.25-17
- Weight: 68 kg (dry)

The initial model numbers are Super Cub numbers with the suffix H for Hunter, or T for Trail. These bikes are technically not CT-series bikes, but C- and CA- series variants. However, Honda would give the new Trail Cub line its own CT designation by 1964, so any overview of the CT-series should include these first models for clarity.

There is no CA100H because CA100 designated an America-only export Super Cub, hence H for Hunter version would not apply.

These first bikes exhibit the chief characteristics of the Trail Cub line. The Super Cub's plastic engine cover and leg shield were removed, exposing the long single tube joining the rear pressed-steel frame with the forks. The bikes have knobby tires, and the Super Cub's large front fender was replaced with a smaller unit to better clear mud. The Trail Cub has a single saddle followed by a large chrome equipment rack, on which a second saddle can be installed. There is also a skid plate to prevent damage to the low-slung engine. As with all Cubs, the fuel tank is within the seat pedestal.

These bikes also introduce characteristics that would only be typical of the first few Trail Cub models. The forks are Super Cub style, being a pressed steel unit with small leading-link springs. The long exhaust pipe sweeps straight back horizontal near the ground, unlike the upswept exhaust that would become characteristic of later bikes. The stepped chainrings are also quite evident, as the larger off-road ring is nearly twice the diameter of the road ring. This large sprocket also required the left rear shock absorber to be repositioned outboard of the swingarm, on an extended top mount, the right side remaining in its normal C100 position inboard of the swingarm.

=== 1962–1965 C105H/C105T/CA105T "Trail 55" ===
1963 Honda C105H Hunter Cub
- Engine: 54 cc OHV 4-stroke
- Top speed: 65 km/h
- Power: 5 hp @ 9,500 rpm
- Transmission: 3-speed + stepped chainring, automatic clutch

The "105" bikes are largely identical to their "100" predecessor. The rear shock mounts are made further apart to place both outboard of the swingarm (the C100T had only the left side outboard to clear the large sprocket). There is a slight increase in engine size from 49 cc to 54 cc, and 1963 sees the introduction the distinctive upswept exhaust with large chrome heat-shield.

=== 1964–1966 CT200 "Trail 90" ===
1964 Honda CT200 Hunter Cub
- Engine: 87 cc 4-stroke push rod engine
- Transmission: 3-speed + stepped chainring, automatic clutch

1965 Honda CT200 Trail 90
- Engine: 87 cc Push rod 4-stroke
- Transmission: 4-speed + stepped chainring, automatic clutch
- Tires: 2.50-17, 2.75-17

The 1964 CT200 is technically the first "CT-series" Honda.

This bike represents a relatively large increase in engine size from 54 cc to 87 cc, and the introduction of a 4-speed transmission. This bike also introduced adjustable steel-tube handlebars, rather than the fixed, pressed-steel covered, Super Cub style bars of previous bikes. It was a bigger heavier bike, the frame and engine being based on the CM90, rather than the C100.-

=== 1966–1979 CT90 "Trail 90" ===
1970 Honda CT90 Trail 90
- Predecessor: CT200 (Honda)
- Successor: CT 110 (Honda)
- Engine: 89.5 cc OHV 4-stroke
- Transmission: dual-range 4-speed, automatic clutch
- Brakes: Drum front and rear
- Tires: 2.75-17-4PR
- Wheelbase: 1.215 m
- Dimensions: L: 1.870 m W: .680 m H: 1.040 m
- Fuel capacity: 6 L
- Oil capacity: .95 L
- Fuel consumption: 80 to 90 mpg

1974 Honda CT90 Trail 90
- Engine: 89.5 cc OHV 4-stroke
- Transmission: dual-range 4-speed, automatic clutch
- Tires: 2.75-17-4PR
- Wheelbase: 1.220 m
- Dimensions: L: 1.870 m W: .740 m H: 1.060 m
- Seat height: .775 m
- Fuel capacity: 5.5 L

The CT90 begins the now-familiar Honda nomenclature of prefix letters indicating bike family, followed by numbers indicating engine size. The 87cc OHV engine is replaced by an 89cc alloy-head OHC unit, which is basically a 4-speed version of that used in the CM91 Super Cub.

This model sees two important improvements to the series. In 1968 the stepped-chainring is replaced with a convenient secondary gearbox that only requires a turn of a small lever placed near the rider's left heel. In 1969 the Super Cub style leading-link fork is replaced with a modern telescopic fork of greatly increased travel.

This Trail Cub would become one of the most popular models, staying in production for 13 years.

=== 1968 CT50 Hunter Cub ===
1968 Honda CT50 Hunter Cub
- Engine: 49 cc OHV 4-stroke
- Transmission: dual-range 3-speed, automatic clutch

In 1968 Honda announced a new CT50 Hunter Cub for the home market. This light-weight bike featured the new dual-range gearbox, coupled with a 3-speed transmission. It retained the Super Cub style leading-link fork.

=== 1980-2008 CT110 "Trail 110" ===
1981 Honda CT110 Hunter Cub
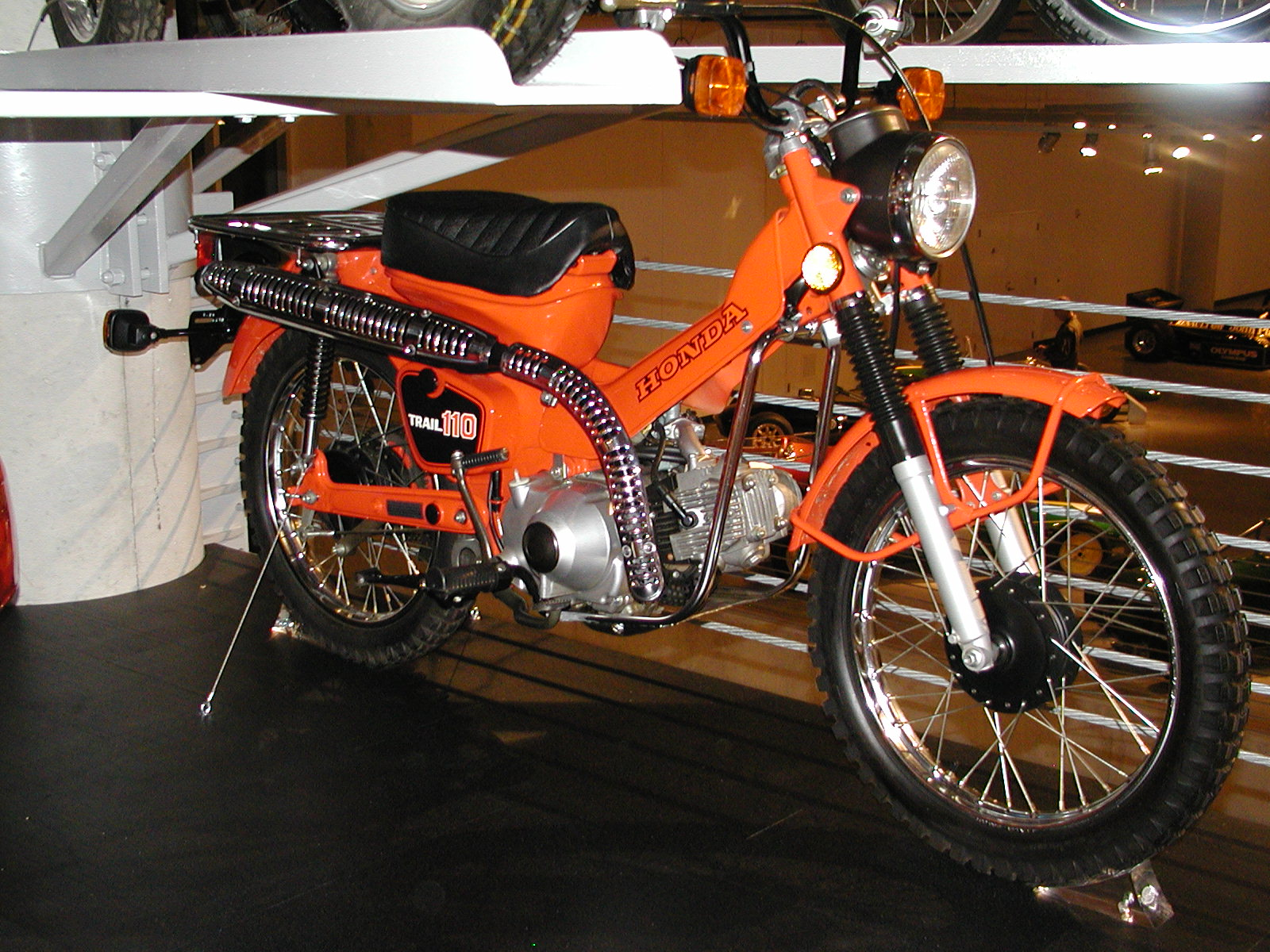
- Engine: JD01E 105 cc OHV 4-stroke
- Power: 7.6 hp @ 7,500 rpm
- Torque: 0.85 kg-m @ 6,000 rpm
- Transmission: dual-range 4-speed, automatic clutch
- Tires: 2.75-17-4 PR
- Wheelbase: 1.220 m
- Dimensions: L: 1.905 m W: 0.755 m H: 1.060 m
- Seat height: .770 m
- Weight: 87 kg (192 lb) (dry); 92 kg (203 lb) (wet)
- Fuel capacity: 5.5 L (1.452 g)
- Fuel consumption: 60 km/L @ 50 km/h (140 MPG @ 31.1 m/h)
- Turning radius: 1.8

The CT110 is the final model of the Trail Cub line. It is largely identical to the CT90 except for an increase in engine size from 89.5 cc to 105 cc. Very late model CT110 have a completely enclosed chainguard like a Super Cub.

The bike was last sold in the US in 1986. Honda lists domestic production from 1981 to 2000.

The CT110 has a long association with the Australia Post as a mail carrier vehicle, leading to the popular moniker "Postie Bike". Australia Post was still receiving hundreds of new CT110 as late as 2010.

== CT50 Motra ==
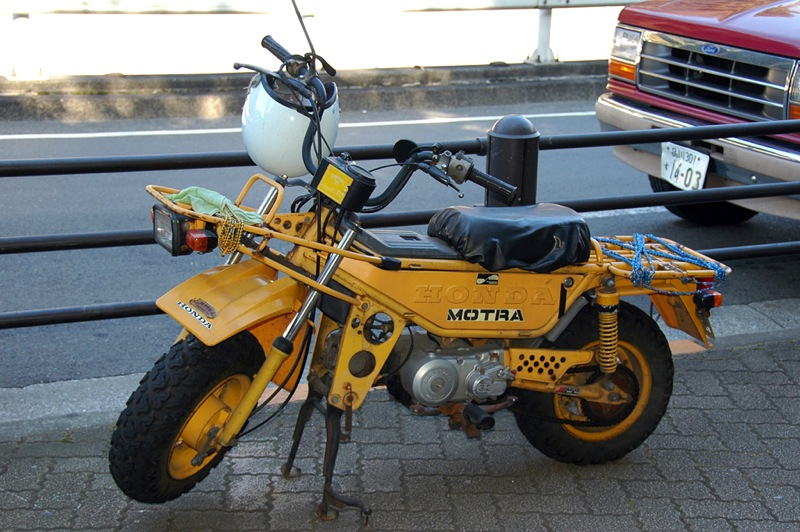

The CT50 Motra is a minibike produced in 1982–1983 for the Japanese domestic market. It has a boxy rugged appearance, with an angular steel-tube and panel frame supporting large racks fore and aft. This utility/military style is emphasized by a lack of decorative chrome, and by a solid yellow or green paint scheme for all bodywork and wheels.

It is unrelated to the Trail Cub series and should not be confused with the 1968 CT50 Hunter Cub.

== CT70 "Trail 70" ==
The Honda ST70 Dax was sold in Canada and the US as the CT70 "Trail 70" from 1969 to 1982 in the United States and 1986 in Canada, and reintroduced in 1991 until 1994 . It is a minibike distinguished by a pressed-steel "T-bone" frame, and equipped with folding handle-bars.

The slightly larger ST90 Dax was sold in the US as the Trailsport, but was not given a CT-series designation. This was probably to avoid confusion with the concurrent Trail Cub CT90 "Trail 90".

== CT125/CT185/CT200 Farm Bikes ==
1977 CT125
- Engine: 124.00 ccm (7.57 cubic inches) SOHC single-cylinder air-cooled 4-stroke
- Bore / stroke: 56.5 x 49.5 mm (2.2 x 1.9 inches)
- Compression ratio: 8.0:1
- Transmission: 5-speed
- Suspension: Inverted Forks, Twin Rear Spring
- Brakes: Expanding brake (front and rear)
- Tires: 3/19-4PR (front) 3.50/17-4PR (rear)
- Rake, trail: n/a, 110 mm (4.3 inches)
- Wheelbase: 1,295 mm (51.0 inches)
- Dimensions: L: 2,035 mm (80.1 inches); W: 900 mm (35.4 inches); H: 1,100 mm (43.3 inches)
- Seat height: 813 mm (32.0 inches)
- Fuel capacity: 6.05 liters (1.51 liters reserve)

1982 CT185
- Also called: MD05
- Engine: 180.2 cc SOHC single-cylinder air-cooled 4-stroke
- Power: 13.2 hp @ 7,500 rpm
- Torque: 1.43 kg-m @ 4,500 rpm
- Transmission: 5-speed
- Tires: 3.00-19-4PR, 3.50-18-4PR
- Wheelbase: 1.295 m
- Dimensions: L: 2.035 m W: .900 m H: 1.100 m
- Seat height: .820 m
- Weight: 106.5 kg (dry)
- Fuel capacity: 6.2 L

1984 CT200
- Also called: MD12
- Engine: 191.8 cc SOHC single-cylinder air-cooled 4-stroke
- Transmission: 5-speed
- Tires: 3.00-19-4PR, 3.50-18-4PR
- Wheelbase: 1.295 m
- Dimensions: L: 2.035 m W: .900 m H: 1.100 m
- Seat height: .820 m
- Fuel capacity: 6.2 L

Honda has built a series of CT models for agricultural use in Australia and for general use in developing nations around the world. As a general description these are variants of the mid-1970s Honda XL125 street/trail bikes, and were equipped with wider saddles, a 19" front wheel, a fully enclosed chainguard, front and rear cargo racks, and protective bash guards around the control levers and the engine. The mid-1970's design was sturdy and effective in its intended role. It lingered on without significant changes to the chassis until the CTX200 Bushlander was introduced in the 2000s.

The last model of CT110 Trail Cub (described above) is also marketed as a Farm Bike in Australia. It is not mechanically related to these bikes. The CT110 is part of the family of "horizontal" Hondas, (meaning that the cylinder is inclined forward to the extent that it is nearly horizontal), the CT125/185/200's are "upright" Hondas, meaning that the cylinder stands nearly straight up and down. Completely different, the two engines are not interchangeable. For the 2024 model year, Honda introduced an updated and enlarged model of the horizontal CT110, calling it the CT125/Trail 125. This name had previously been used for the upright CT125.

=== CT125 "Trail 125" ===
The 1975(?)–1989 (Australia; possibly later in other markets) Honda CT125 is a 125cc 4-stroke motorbike which was designed for farm use. The bike is actually an XL125 with a more 'comfortable' seat. The CT125, which takes its engine from the TL125 with different gear ratios, also has lower gearing than the XL125. The first two gears are spaced very close together for low speed operation. The CT also came with a chrome rear rack, a steel handlebar and lever protector, engine guard, sidestand guard, a smaller 19" front wheel (XL125 had a 21"), and a unique enclosed chainguard that completely covers the drive chain. The seat is also shorter and the bike is only designed to carry one person, not two. Also specific to the CT125 are the large mudflaps front and rear. On early models, the frame is painted Shiny Orange as is the tank. Fenders and side covers were molded of orange plastic. Later models had black frames with red tank and body work and a blue seat. Variations also exist which have a white tank and body work and the frame painted either orange or white. All CT125's have a sturdy bash plate with holes drilled in it welded into the bottom of the frame at the factory.

CT125's were sold in Australia and other parts of the South Pacific, as well as in South America. Many saw very hard use in very remote areas.

The CT125 was also exported to the US and Canada for the 1977 model year only.

In the late 1980s and early 1990s Honda also produced the CT200 AutoAg. (This should not be confused with the late 1960s Honda model which was also called the "CT200" but which was a completely different machine.) This was essentially the same as the CT125, but was fitted with the engine which had previously been used in the ATC200 three wheeler. This engine shared much of its basic architecture with other Honda SOHC two valve 125-200cc engines (such as the CB, XL, and XR 125/185/200), but was equipped with a recoil starter, 12V electric starter, and an automatic clutch. Gear selection was still manual, operated by a heel-toe shift lever much like the CT90/110.

Most CT125-200's up until the early 1990s came from the factory with a 18" rear wheel and 19" front wheel and drum brakes. The 1977 North American model was equipped with a 17" rear wheel.

From 2002 to 2008, Honda also produced for some markets the CTX200 "Bushlander". A slightly newer version of the Honda SOHC 2 valve engine was again used (this time with a manual clutch) and the model shared many parts, such as the frame, seat, tank and other bodywork with the NX125. Faux radiator shrouds were mounted on the fuel tank rather than the NX's wrap around front fairing. Wheels were 21" front and 18" rear. Unlike the older CT125-200's, which were all equipped with dual shock rear suspension, the CTX was equipped with a variation of Honda's Pro-Link monoshock rear suspension. While the front brake was upgraded to a hydraulic disc, the rear remained a drum brake.

== CT250S Silk Road ==
CT250S Silk Road
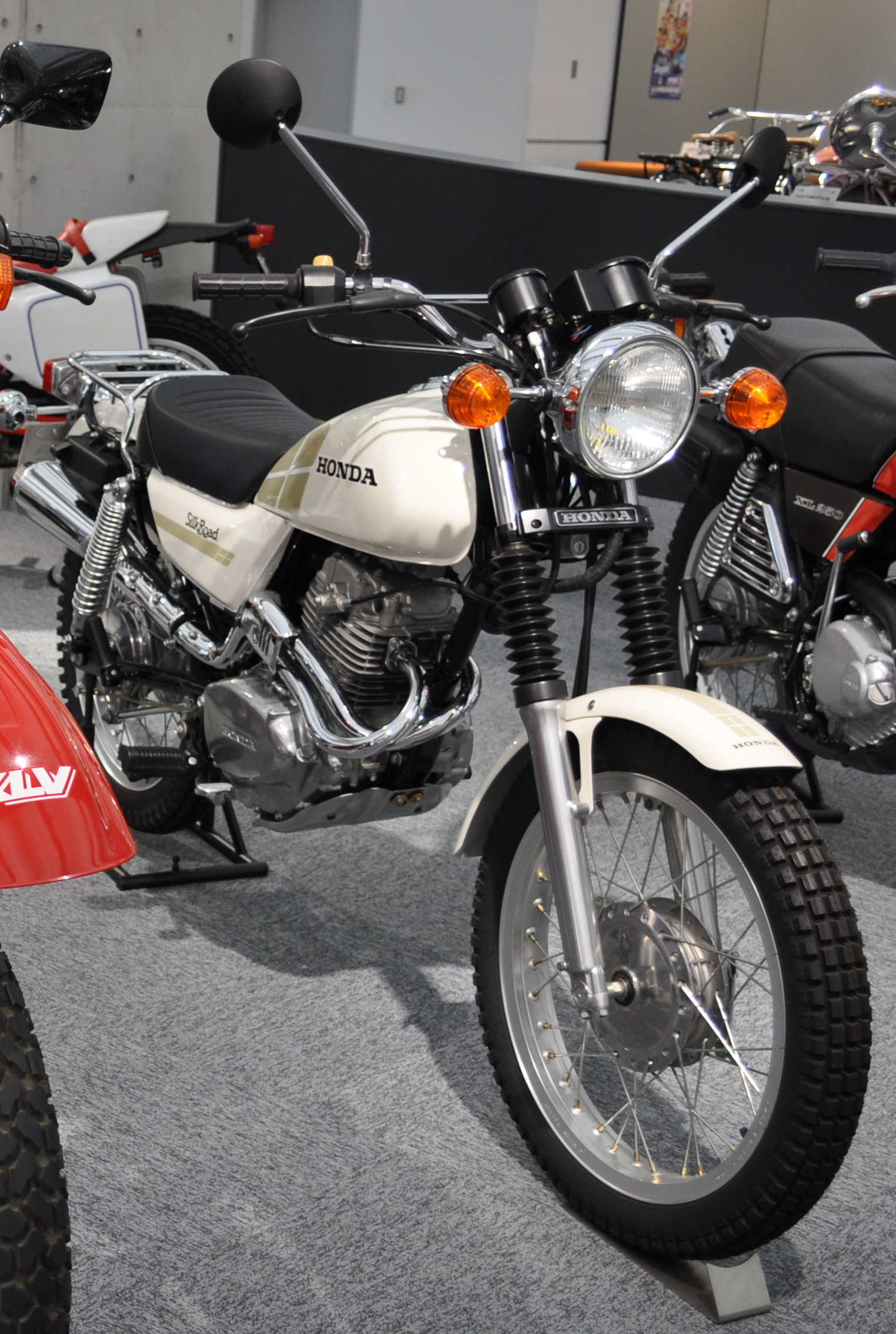
- 1981 CT250S Silk Road
- Also called: L250S
- Engine: L250SE 248 cc OHC 4-valve parallel-twin air-cooled 4-stroke
- Transmission: 6-speed
- Tires: 3.00-19-4PR, 3.50-18-4PR
- Wheelbase: 1.390 m
- Dimensions: L: 2.140 m W: 0.815 m H: 1.125 m
- Seat height: 0.775 m
- Fuel capacity: 11 L

The 1981 CT250S Silk Road was Honda's attempt at a "trekking" motorcycle, marketed between its mechanical siblings, the CB250RS road bike and the XL250 dirt bike. It has slightly more ground clearance than the CB250RS, and an upswept and close-fitted chrome exhaust that is kept clear of both debris and luggage. The Silk Road was offered with a single saddle followed by a chrome baggage rack. A removable pillion seat can be fitted to this rack. Its 6-speed transmission is geared as a regular 5-speed plus one extra-low gear.

== 2020 CT125 ==
CT125 Trail
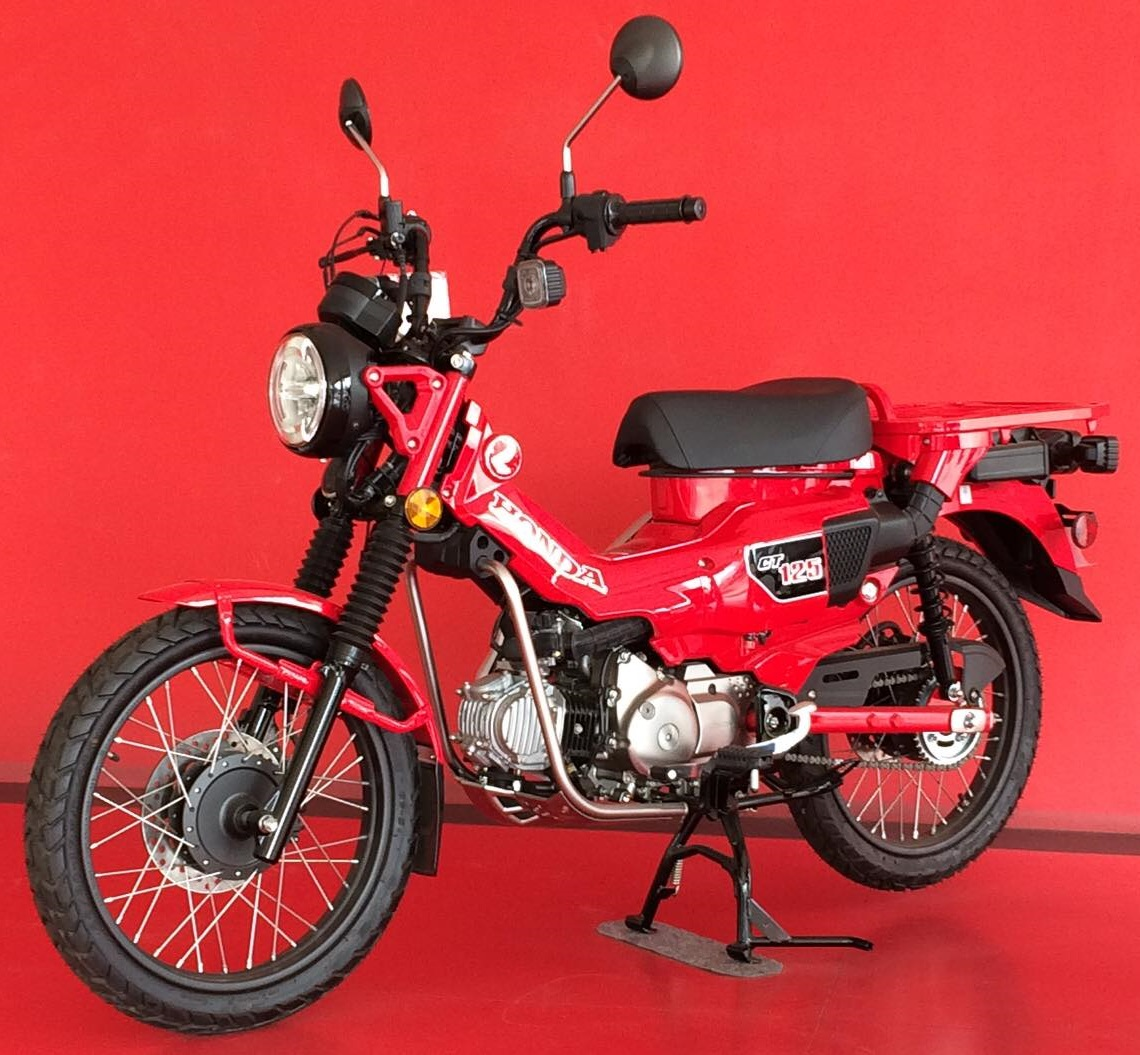
- 2020 Honda Trail CT125
- Engine: 124.9cc air-cooled, single cylinder 4 stroke
- Transmission: 4-speed, semi-automatic
- Brakes: Front: 220mm disc, ABS, Rear: 190mm disc
- Tires: Front: 80/90-17, Rear: 80/90-17
- Rake, trail: 27.0°, 3.1"
- Wheelbase: 1.254 m
- Seat height: 0.8 m
- Fuel capacity: 5.3 L
- Related: curb weight(wet) - 116.12 kg

In 2019 Honda announced they would be bringing back the Iconic design of the CT110 with a model dubbed the CT125 (Not to be confused with the farm bike of the same name). It was released in Australia in 2020 and America in 2021. The vehicle is equipped with several modern features such as an LED Instrument cluster, Led Headlights and Front Wheel ABS.

The Model CT-125 was available in the US in Red for 2020–2022. It was green in 2023, and bright yellow was adopted in 2024.

== See also ==
- Honda Super Cub
