= Bank of Makati =

Bank in the Philippines

Bank of Makati (A Savings Bank) Inc.
- Formerly: Rural Bank of Makati (until 2005); Bank of Makati (A Rural Bank) Inc., (2005- 2015)
- Company type: Private
- Industry: Finance
- Founded: J.P. Rizal, Makati, Rizal, Philippines (September 22, 1956; 69 years ago)
- Headquarters: Ayala Avenue Extension, Makati, Metro Manila, Philippines
- Number of locations: 102 Branches; 48 Regular Branch; 14 Microfinance-oriented; 40 Branch-lite units
- Key people: Thomas C. Ongtenco, (Chairman); Luis M. Chua, (President)
- Services: Banking, Insurance
- Net income: ₱2.02 billion ▼ (2020)
- Total assets: ₱48.5 billion (Q3 2022)
- Parent: Motortrade (as affiliate company)
- Website: www.bankofmakati.com.ph

Bank of Makati, (A Savings Bank) (BMI) is a Filipino thrift bank established in 1956. It was founded in 1956 as a rural bank prior to its approval by the Bangko Sentral ng Pilipinas to operate as a thrift bank on April 28, 2015, when it officially became a savings bank.

== History ==
The Bank of Makati was established on September 22, 1956, as the "Rural Bank of Makati, Inc." along J.P. Rizal in the then-town of Makati, Rizal. In October 2001, the banking company underwent a change in ownership as well as some reforms. In November 2005, the name of the company was officially changed to "Bank of Makati (A Rural Bank), Inc.".

In 2006, the banking company was included in the list of Top 1000 Corporations in the Philippines. According to the Business World Corporate Profile 2008, the Bank of Makati is the biggest rural bank in the country with total assets worth ₱5.2 billion and a net worth of more than ₱800 million exceeding the worth of some savings banks.

The Bank of Company underwent a re-branding in 2009 and adopted a new logo and slogan. Bangko Sentral ng Pilipinas granted the Bank of Makati a Certificate of Authority to operate as a thrift bank on April 28, 2015. With the granting of the certificate, the banking company officially changed its name to "Bank of Makati (A Savings Bank), Inc.".

== Services ==
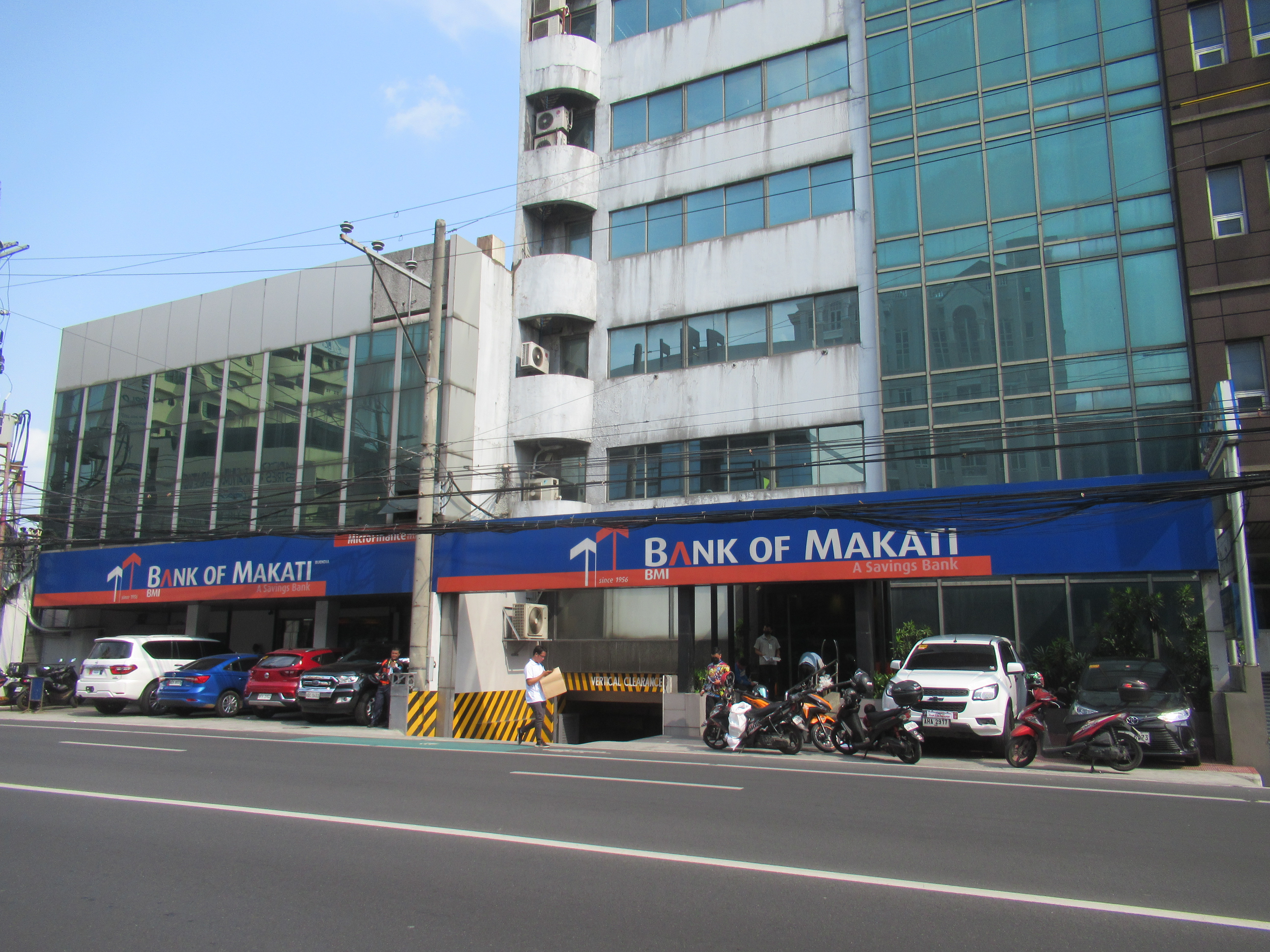
A Bank of Makati branch in Makati

Bank of Makati also provides motorcycle loans for customers of its sister company, Motortrade, and its affiliate businesses Motorjoy Depot Inc., Honda Prestige, and Motortrade Topline.

== See also ==
- BancNet
- List of banks in the Philippines
