= Honda XL1000V Varadero =

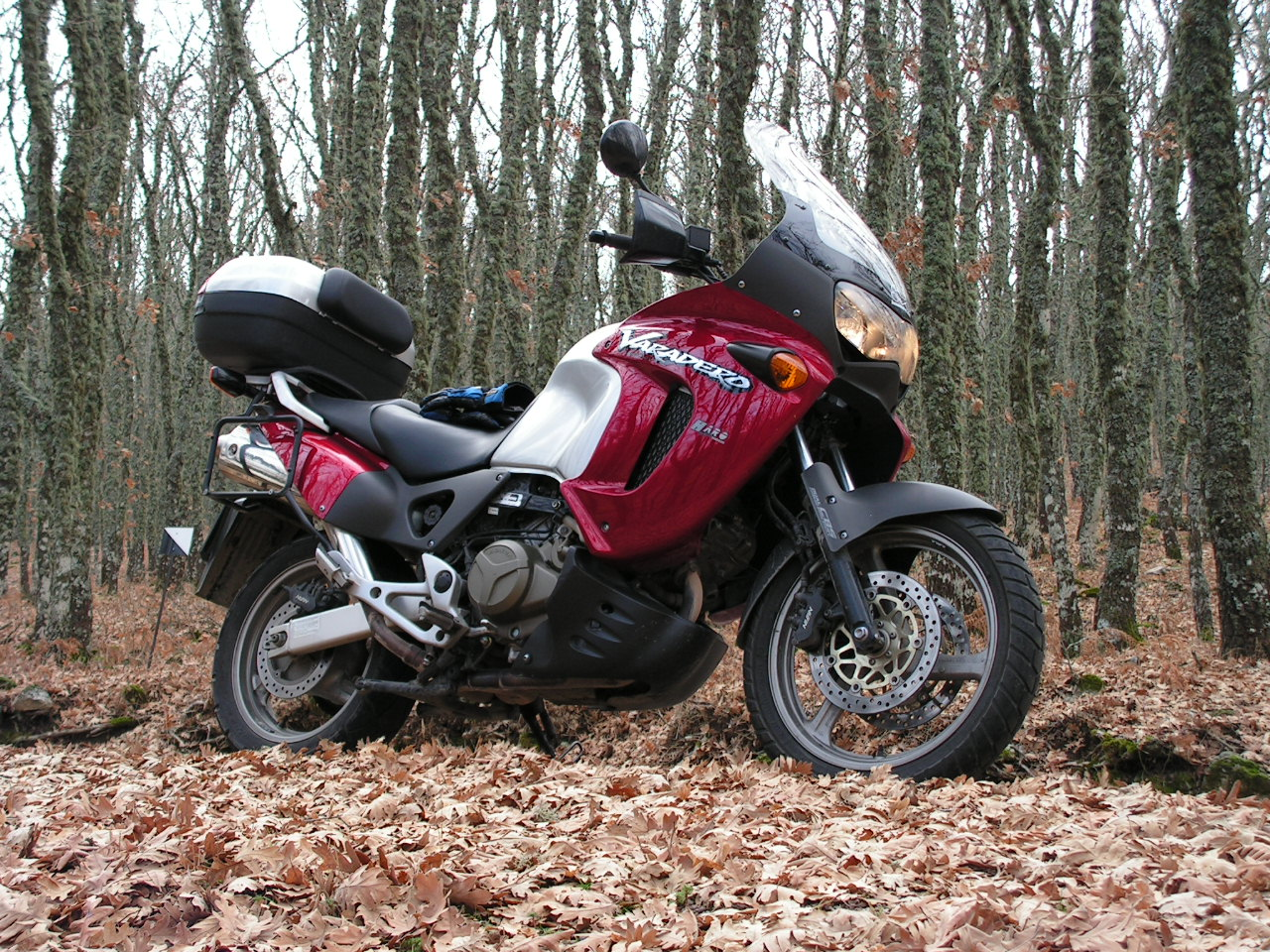
- Manufacturer: Honda
- Production: 1999–present
- Predecessor: Honda Africa Twin
- Class: Dual-sport
- Engine: 996 cc (60.8 cu in), liquid-cooled, 90° V-twin
- Bore / stroke: 98 mm × 66 mm (3.9 in × 2.6 in)
- Compression ratio: 9.8:1
- Top speed: 200 km/h (125 mph)
- Power: 93 hp (69 kW) @ 8,000 rpm
- Torque: 98 N⋅m (72 lbf⋅ft) @ 6,000 rpm
- Transmission: Five speed then Six-speed, chain O-ring-sealed chain; 16T/47T
- Suspension: Front: 43 mm telescopic fork; 155 mm (6.1 in) travel Rear: Pro-Link single shock with spring preload and rebound-damping adjustability; 145 mm (5.7 in) travel
- Brakes: Front: double disc Rear: disc
- Tires: 110/80R–19 radial front; 150/70R–17 radial rear
- Wheelbase: 1,560 mm (61 in)
- Dimensions: L: 2,295 mm (90.4 in)
- Seat height: 838 mm (33.0 in)
- Weight: 244.2 kg (538 lb) (dry); 276.7 kg (610 lb) (wet)
- Fuel capacity: 25L average fuel consumption 6.5L/100km
- Related: XL125V Varadero

The Honda XL1000V Varadero is a dual-sport motorcycle produced by Honda. Different models have been in production from 1998 to 2013. Fuel injection was introduced in 2003, which offered a smoother motor and throttle operation, as well as ABS. It has capabilities for long road trips and limited off-road use. A smaller 125 cc (7.6 cu in) version, the XL125V Varadero was also produced.

Varadero is the big brother of the Transalp. Since 2015, a newer design, the Africa Twin 1000, has been produced, and in some markets offering a DCT transmission.

== XL1000VA ==
Honda's earliest XL1000V Varadero flagship Adventure Touring motorcycle with a 996 cc V-twin engine was introduced to the public at the 1998 Munich motorcycle show. First launched in 1998 as a 1999 Model Year, its engine architecture is based on the Honda VTR1000F Firestorm/Superhawk. The Adventure category refers to motorcycles that are designed for long-range touring with basic off-road capability, hence the term Adventure used by Honda as opposed to Dual Sport as used on the Honda XR650L.

All versions feature a liquid-cooled V-twin engine. In 2001, Honda introduced its Honda Ignition Security System (HISS), essentially an engine immobilizer system similar to the ones used in automobiles.

In 2001, production of the Varadero was switched to the Spanish Montesa Honda factory outside of Barcelona.

For 2003, the Varadero received some major changes. These included the move to fuel injection and the addition of a six-speed gearbox, some cosmetic alterations and a new instrument panel. These changes benefited the model with better torque and fuel consumption. In 2004 ABS was introduced, and it is now fitted as standard in a number of markets based on Honda's safety commitment.
