= Honda XLV750R =

Dual-sport motorcycle

Honda XLV750R(D)
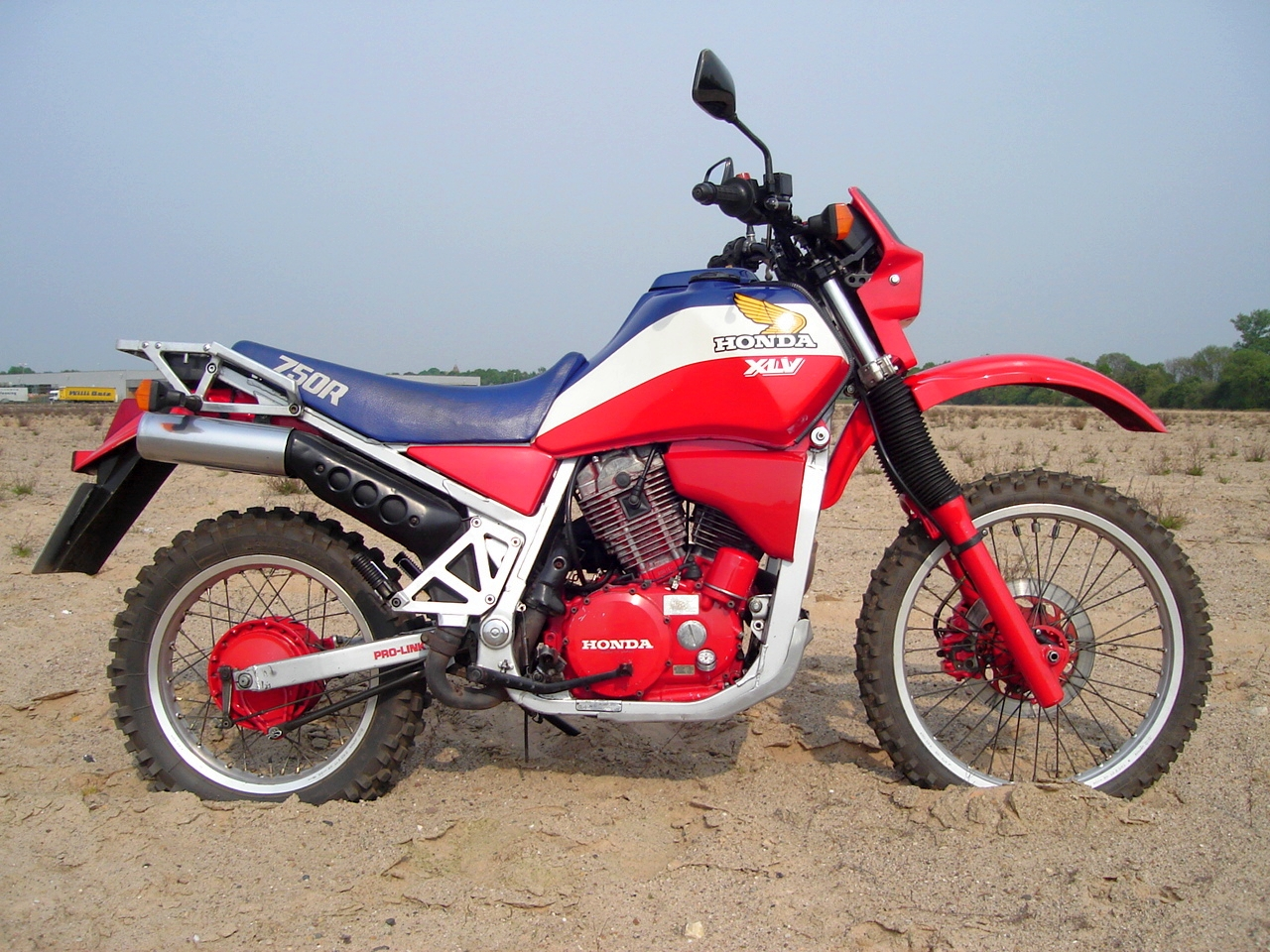
- Manufacturer: Honda
- Production: 1983–1986
- Predecessor: none
- Successor: XL600V Transalp and XRV650 Africa Twin
- Class: dual-sport
- Engine: Type: 4-stroke, 749 cc, air-/oil-cooled, 45° V-twin with 90° crank pin offset Bore and Stroke: 79.5mm x 75.5mm Compression Ratio: 8.4:1; Valve Train: SOHC; three valves with hydraulic tappets per cylinder Carburetion: two 36mm Keihin suction carburetors
- Top speed: 175 km/h (109 mph)
- Power: 45.5 kW (61.0 hp) at 7000 rpm
- Torque: 69 N⋅m (51 lb⋅ft) at 5500 rpm
- Ignition type: CDI, two spark plugs per cylinder
- Transmission: 5-speed manual, Shaft final drive
- Brakes: Front: disc Rear: drum
- Wheelbase: 1480 mm
- Seat height: 860 mm
- Weight: 189 kg (416 lbs) (dry); 220 kg (484 lbs) (wet)
- Fuel capacity: 19.4 liters (including the 5 liter reserve)

The Honda XLV750R is a dual-sport motorcycle manufactured from 1983 to 1986 by Honda Motor Company, Japan. A first prototype of the motorcycle was introduced to the public at the Paris Motor Show in October 1982. The XLV was initially intended for the European market only (with the exception of the UK), but from 1985 on, it was also sold in Australia and New Zealand. In the first production run in 1983, 500 "Limited Edition"-models were produced for the Japanese home market. The "Limited Edition"-models can be identified by a golden metal badge attached to the right side of the auxiliary frame (below the seat) and are otherwise, except for the perforated front brake disc and the blue strap on the seat, identical to the standard model.

== Description and history ==
Honda had intended the XLV to be a tourer with limited off-road capabilities. It is therefore hard to understand why Honda presented the motorbike to the press on a motocross track (on the island of Ibiza, Spain, in the spring of 1983). In the early 1980s, most dual-sport motorcycles had only one cylinder and weighed about 120 to 150 kilos - compared to them, the XLV with its 220 kilos (fully fueled) seemed to be unfit for sporty off-road driving. At the launch, several journalists crashed the heavy bike on the motocross track, for which it was entirely unsuited.

The XLV750R (Honda type designation: RD01) was Honda's first dual-sport motorcycle with two non-parallel cylinders. It has an air-/oil-cooled V-twin engine with hydraulic valve tappets and a shaft drive. Those two construction features make the XLV a very low maintenance motorcycle. Other technical highlights at the time of introduction were the dry sump lubrication system (with the main frame acting as an oil tank, helping to lower engine temperatures), the three valves per cylinder (two inlet valves / one exhaust valve), the two spark plugs per cylinder, and the crankshaft with off-set pins.

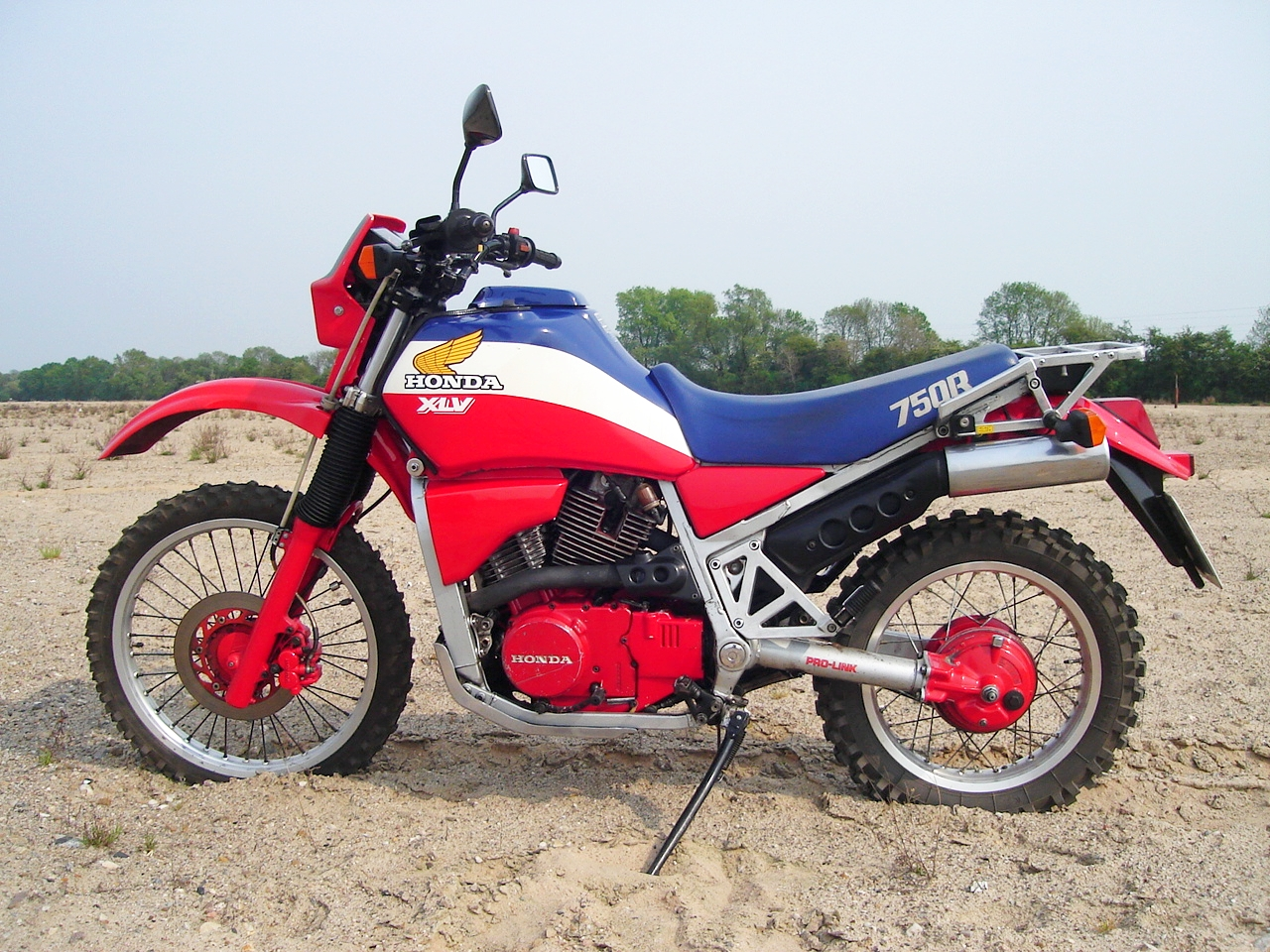
Honda XLV750R(D)

The distinctive air scoops mounted below the fuel tank on either side of the motorbike provide additional cooling for the rear cylinder. They were only installed after tests of prototype models revealed thermal problems of the engine.

Initially the XLV was offered in the aggressive colours of the Honda Racing Corporation (HRC), namely blue, white, and red, with a red engine, red fork rods and red hubs. This model bears the additional designation "D".

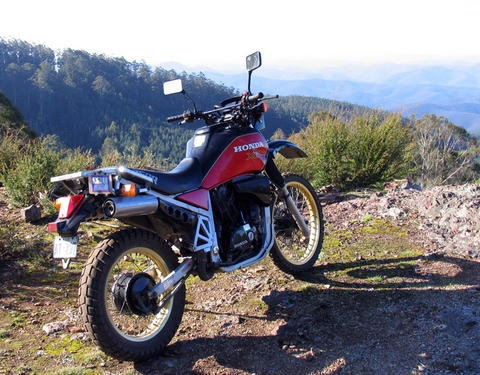
Honda XLV750R(F)

In 1985, a revised version of the XLV750R was introduced, bearing the additional designation "F". The XLV750R(F)-models were improved in some details (tamer cams resulting in 6 hp less power, improved automatic cam chain tensioners, improved carburetor setup, among other minor modifications) and had a black engine and golden rims with black hubs. These motorcycles were painted in the colour combinations black/blue metallic, black/red metallic and black/silver grey and were mainly marketed in Italy, France, and Australia. Honda never officially offered them in Germany, probably because the demand was very low due to the mainly negative press the XLV had received there.

In 1986, the production of the XLV750R (RD01) was discontinued. Officially, the RD-genealogy was continued with the solely chain driven models NX650 Dominator (RD02 and RD 08), XRV650/750 Africa Twin (RD03, RD04, RD07), XR650L (RD06), SLR650/FX650 Vigor (RD09), XL650V/XL700V Transalp (RD10, RD11, RD13) and FMX650 (RD12). The type designation "RD05" was not assigned.

Due to its (in Honda proportions) low production numbers of approximately no more than 10,000 units worldwide ("D"- and "F"-models combined), the XLV750R is quite seldom seen - and in many countries, especially outside of Europe and Australia, it is an extremely rare bird.
