= Honda XRV650 =

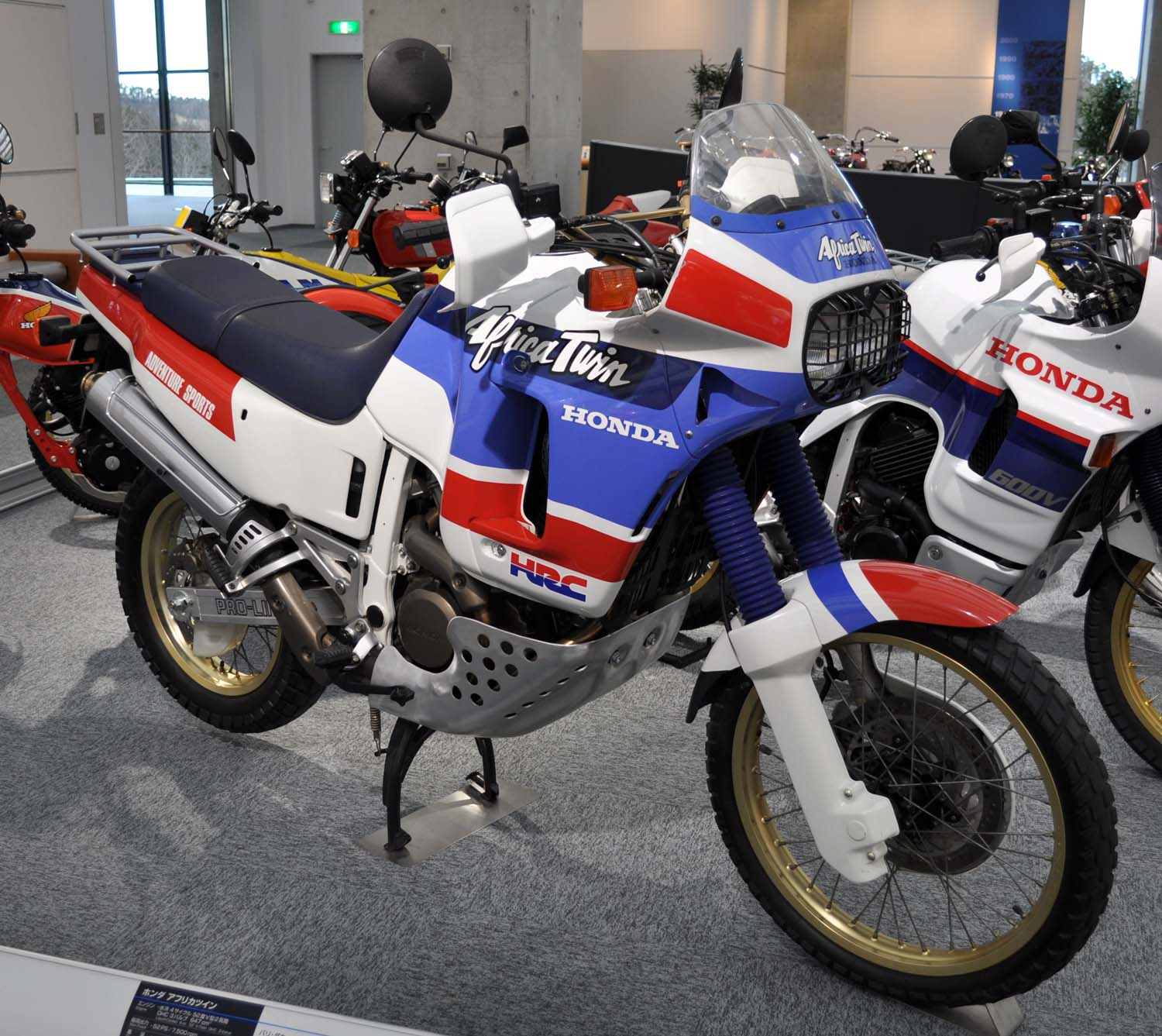
- Manufacturer: Honda
- Also called: Africa Twin
- Production: 1988–1989
- Predecessor: Honda XLV750R
- Successor: Honda XRV750
- Class: Dual-sport
- Engine: 647 cc (39.5 cu in) 52° V-twin. SOHC, 3 Valve per cylinder
- Bore / stroke: 79 mm × 66 mm (3.1 in × 2.6 in)
- Compression ratio: 9.4:1
- Power: 57 hp (43 kW)@ 8,000 rpm
- Torque: 55 N⋅m (41 lbf⋅ft)@ 6,000 rpm
- Ignition type: CDI with electronic advance
- Transmission: 5-speed manual, chain final drive
- Frame type: Single downtube with double-loop cradle, rectangular section, steel
- Brakes: Front: single 296 mm disc 2 piston calipers Rear: Single 240 mm disc 1 piston caliper
- Dimensions: L: 2,295 mm (90.4 in)

The XRV650 Africa Twin is an enduro motorcycle produced by the Japanese manufacturer Honda from 1988 to 1989. The enduro is derived from the design of the Honda XL600V Transalp and is powered by the V-twin cylinder engine of the Honda NT650 Hawk.

== History ==
In response to the motorsport successes of the BMW R80 GS in the early 1980s, the Honda Racing Corporation (HRC) was commissioned in 1984 to develop a desert-capable, off-road motorcycle for the Paris-Dakar Rally. In 1985 the NXR750V was presented with a water-cooled twin-cylinder with a displacement of 779 cm^{3} and a rated output of 48 kW (65 hp). This motorcycle won the Paris-Dakar Rally four times in a row from 1986 to 1989.

The Africa Twin XRV 650 with manufacturer code RD 03 is not based on the works rally motorcycle NXR 750, but has adopted its look after the success of the NXR in the 1987 Paris-Dakar Rally. Despite a weight of 220 kg with a full tank, the travel enduro was easy to maneuver both on and off-road. In Germany, because of the cheaper type class, the power was reduced by throttling from 57 hp to 50 hp. The top speed is 165 km/h at a speed of 7,640 rpm . The aluminum rims have steel spokes and are fitted with cross-ply tires at the front and rear. The RD 03 decelerates at the front via a disc brake with a two-piston caliper and at the rear with a disc brake with a single-piston caliper. The motorcycle was only available in the Honda Racing Corporation (HRC) color combination (white-red-blue) until 1991.

== Construction ==
The water-cooled four-stroke engine is mounted inline in the frame so that the two cylinders of the V-engine are positioned one behind the other at an angle of 52° to the crankshaft. The two cylinders have a bore of 79 mm, the pistons have a stroke of 66 mm and a compression ratio of 9.4:1. Each cylinder head has a chain-driven camshaft that controls one exhaust and two intake valves. The engine and transmission block unit is vertically separated and made of aluminum alloymanufactured. The crankshaft transmits its torque via gears to a multi-plate wet clutch on the input shaft of the gearbox. The gearbox has five gears and is connected to the rear wheel via a chain.

== Undercarriage ==
The chassis consists of a single-loop tubular steel frame with a double upper section made of rectangular profiles and a classic rear frame. The two stanchions of the telescopic fork have a diameter of Ø 43 mm and a spring travel of 230 mm. They are connected to each other via a fork bridge above the front wheel. The aluminum shock absorber on the rear wheel swing arm has a deflection system and is infinitely adjustable in terms of both spring preload and damping.

== Cooling ==
The engine is cooled with a mixture of water and antifreeze, which dissipates the combustion heat from the two cylinders to the ambient air via two radiators. A coolant pump driven by the oil pump conveys the hot coolant to the coolers and back via a thermostat valve, with the thermostat only fully opening from an operating temperature of 95 °C. The right-hand radiator has a cooling fan as additional cooling for coolant temperatures above 100 °C.

== Rally use ==
The motorcycle was successfully used as the RD 03 Marathon in 1989 and 1990 by Honda France in the marathon class of the Paris-Dakar Rally. A rear tank and an enlarged main tank were installed for the long stages. Many other changes were made to this model such as an engine guard with a water compartment, a modified swingarm for attaching a chain guide and crash bars for the radiators. However, the standard air filter box proved to be problematic. In the second year of the RD 03 Marathon, this was converted to an air intake behind the tank cap.
