= Honda Prestige =

- Trade name: Honda Prestige Traders Inc.
- Industry: Subsidiary
- Headquarters: Cainta, Rizal, Philippines
- Area served: Philippines
- Key people: President: Ramon B. Manzana
- Parent: Motortrade

Honda Prestige Traders Inc. (HPTI), branded as Honda Prestige, is a Honda-branded subsidiary of Motortrade engaged in motorcycle dealership, sales and repair, and loans services exclusively for Honda motorcycles.

== History ==
Honda Prestige is a result of the long-term historic partnership between then Philippine distributor, Mariwasa-Honda, (now Honda Philippines) and Motortrade since the latter's inception in 1969. While Motortrade still carries Honda motorcycle units, most Honda-quality and exclusive services are served via Honda Prestige branches with branches nationwide. As with Motortrade, Mindanao stores are operated on behalf of Honda Prestige by Motorjoy Depot Inc.

== Big Bikes ==
On December 9, 2017, Honda Prestige and its parent company, Motortrade, once again entered a special agreement with Honda Philippines to host the country's first big bike store at the Honda Prestige branch at EDSA cor. Harvard St., Makati. The branch was promptly renamed as the Honda Flagship Shop Manila in a ceremony attended by Mr. Daiki Mihara, president of Honda Philippines.

In a separate gathering in Shangri-La at the Fort, Manila on the same day, Honda Philippines and Honda Prestige also introduced the pioneer big bikes available for purchase at the new store, namely CB500X, African Twin, X-ADV 750, CBR500R, Rebel 500, and CB650F.
