= Honda CRF1000L =

Honda CRF1000L/CRF1100L/CRF1150L
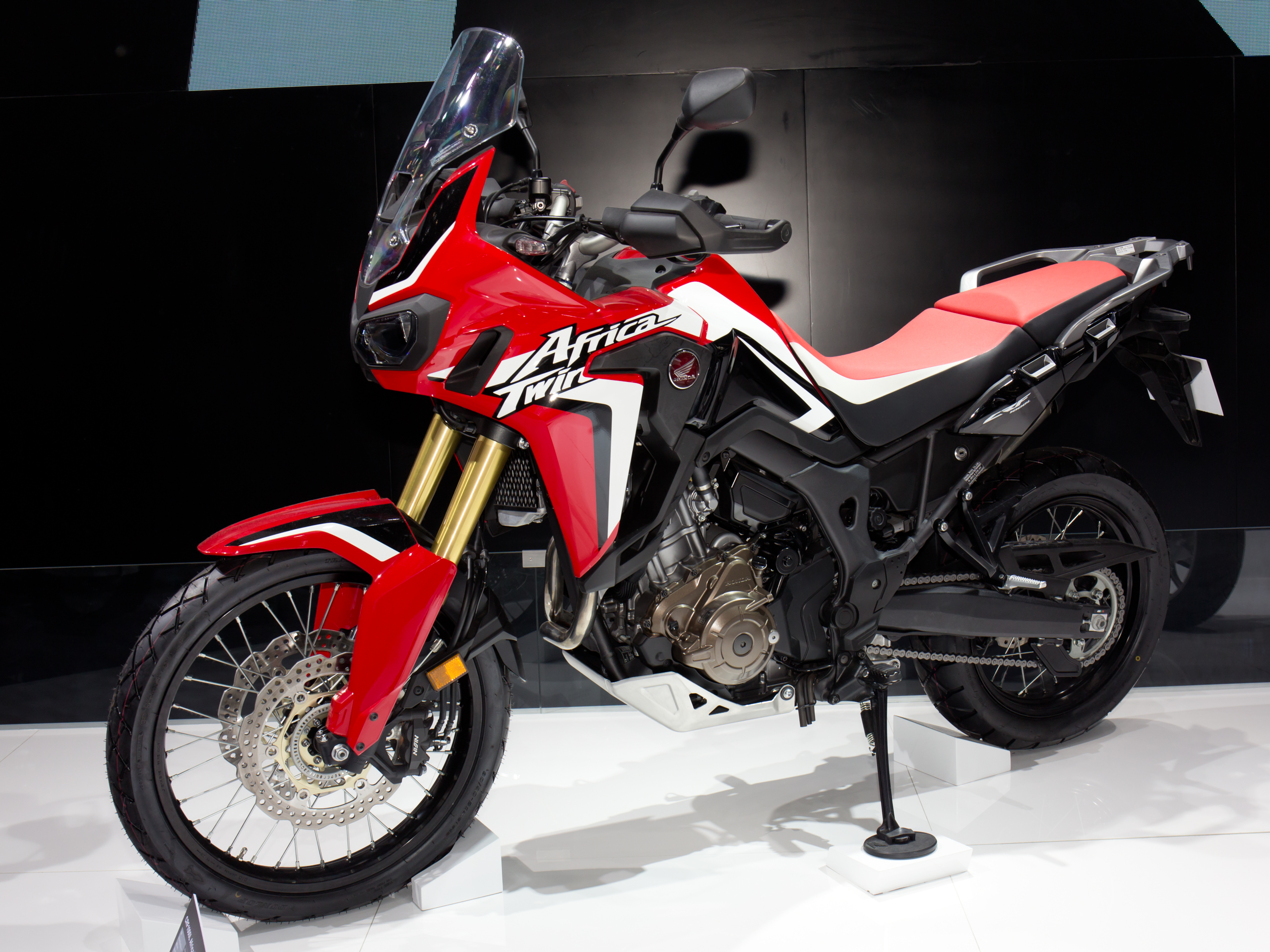
- Africa Twin at the 2016 Auto China.
- Manufacturer: Honda
- Also called: Africa Twin
- Production: 2015–present
- Predecessor: Honda XRV750
- Class: Dual-sport
- Engine: 998 cc (60.9 cu in) parallel-twin, SOHC, 4-stroke, 4 valves per cylinder 1,084 cc (66.1 cu in) (CRF1100L); 1,131 cc (69.0 cu in) (CRF1150L)
- Bore / stroke: 92.0 mm × 75.1 mm (3.62 in × 2.96 in); 92.0 mm × 81.5 mm (3.62 in × 3.21 in) (CRF1100L); 94.0 mm × 81.5 mm (3.70 in × 3.21 in) (CRF1150L)
- Power: 70 kW (94 hp) @ 7,500 rpm 75 kW (101 hp) @ 7,500 rpm (CRF1100L)
- Torque: 98 N⋅m (72 lbf⋅ft) @ 6,000 rpm 105 N⋅m (77 lbf⋅ft) @ 6,250 rpm (CRF1100L)
- Transmission: Chain final drive 6 speed manual or 6 speed dual-clutch transmission
- Frame type: Steel semi-double cradle
- Suspension: Front: 45 mm inverted Showa fork 9.0 in travel Rear: single prolink shock 8.7 in travel
- Brakes: Front: dual 310 mm disc Rear: single 256 mm disc
- Tires: Front: 90/90-R21 tubeless; 110/80-R19 tubeless (Adventure Sports); Rear: 150/70-R18 tubeless
- Wheelbase: 1,600 mm (62 in)
- Seat height: 880–850 mm (34.5–33.5 in)
- Weight: 2016: 228–242 kg (503–534 lb)(claimed) Manual-DCT 2020: 227–238 kg (501–524 lb)(claimed) Base model Manual-DCT 2020: 240–251 kg (530–553 lb)(claimed) Adv Sport Manual-DCT (wet)
- Fuel capacity: 18.9 L (4.2 imp gal; 5.0 US gal)

The CRF1000L is a 998 cc (60.9 cu in) 270° crank, parallel-twin dual-sport that revived the Africa Twin name for the 2016 model year. It became available in the UK in late 2015 and early 2016 in the US. It was developed as a modern interpretation of its predecessors, the XRV 750 and Honda XRV650, based on the NXR-750 which won the Paris-Dakar rally four times in the late 1980s. The original V-twin Africa Twin was first sold in Europe from 1988 to the final production year of 2003 but was never brought to the United States. The CRF1000L has also been seen as a response by Honda to the heavier on road focused adventure touring motorcycles such as the BMW R1200GS, Ducati Multistrada, and Triumph Tiger Explorer with a lighter more off-road focused machine.

== Automatic dual-clutch transmission ==
Lateral view

In a first for the category, the Africa Twin has the option of an evolution of Honda's automatic dual-clutch transmission (DCT) technology, which remains unique to Honda in motorcycling. This latest evolution of DCT has been specifically developed and programmed to provide off-road ability.

== Prototype ==
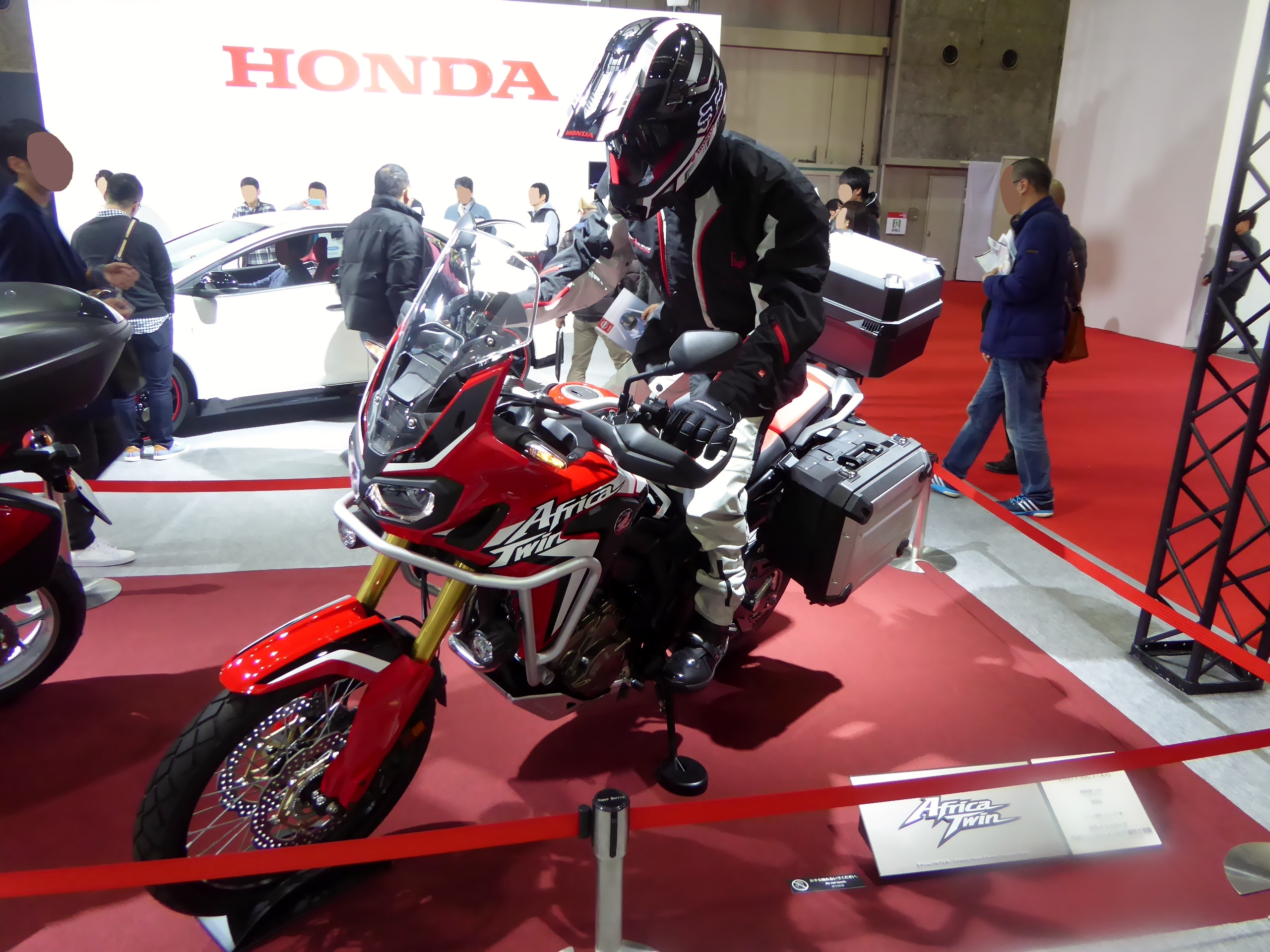
Also at Osaka

The first confirmations of a new off-road focused touring motorcycle came in June 2014 when Honda filed a patent for an externally mounted airbox configuration which would allow for a more slender and lower mounted fuel tank in future dual sport motorcycles. This increases off-road handling by allowing riders to slide further forward into turns without being inhibited by a wide fuel tank with a higher center of gravity.

The first full prototype of the CRF1000 was revealed at the 2014 EICMA international motorcycle show in Milan, Italy. The prototype was heavily disguised with camouflage and covered in mud so that it did not reveal any specific details about the new motorcycle other than visual details such as a parallel twin engine, dual front disk brakes with ABS, 21 inch front and 18 inch rear tires on wire spoked rims, and the absence of a shift lever, indicating the dual-clutch transmission from other Honda motorcycles such as the VFR1200X and NC700X/NC750X could be an available option.

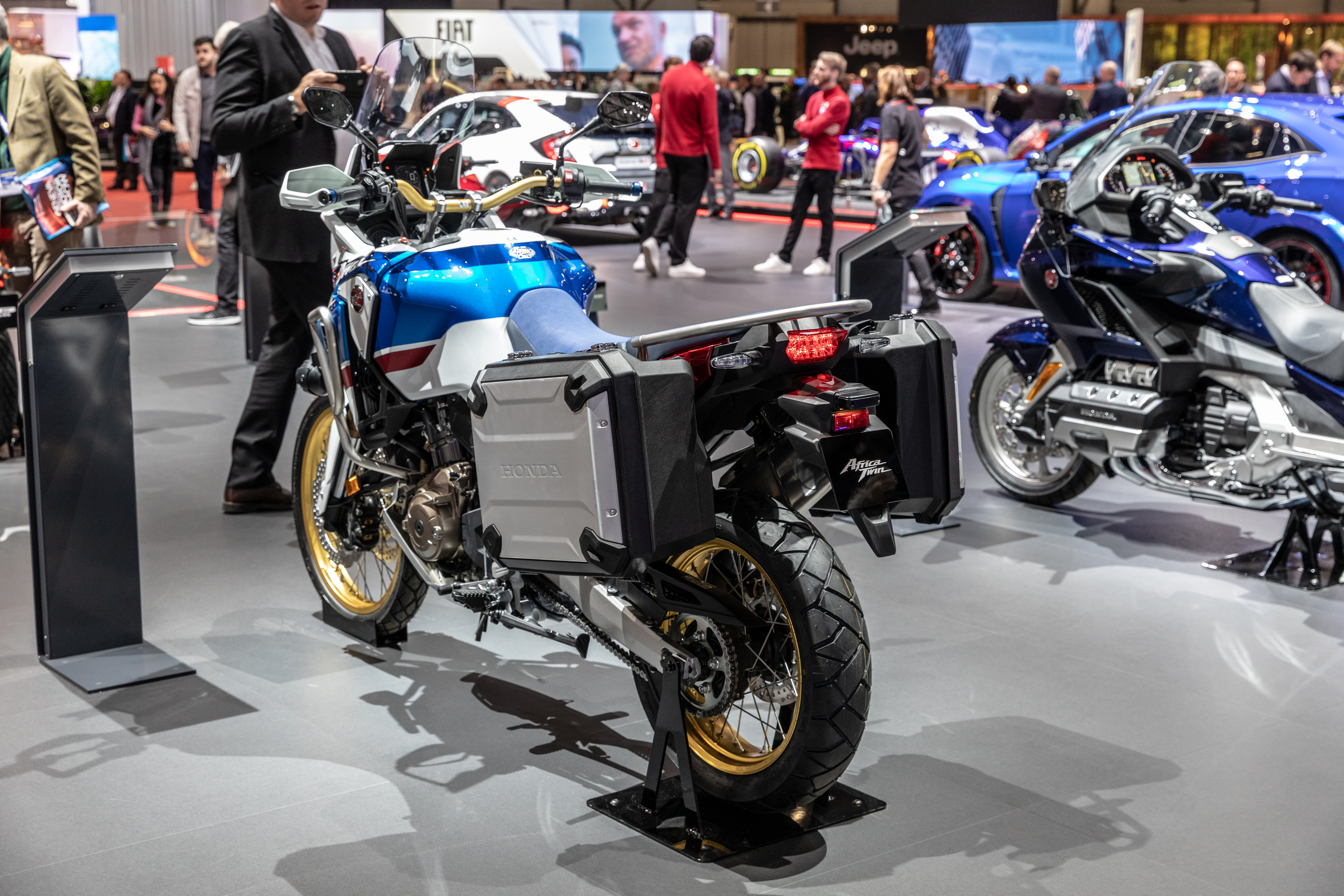
Rear

After the EICMA reveal, Honda began releasing a series of videos titled "True Adventure" documenting the history of the Paris-Dakar rally-winning Africa Twins in the 1980s in anticipation of the release of the new motorcycle.

== Performance ==
Some performance tests listed here were conducted by Otomotif tabloid from Indonesia in February 2017.

Parameter	Time
0–60 km/h (37 mph)	2.5 s
0–80 km/h (50 mph)	3.3 s
0–100 km/h (62 mph)	4.3 s
0–100 m (330 ft)	5.6 s @ 123.5 km/h (76.7 mph)
0–201 m (1/8 mile)	8.3 s @ 147.4 km/h (91.6 mph)
0–402 m (1/4 mile)	12.8 s @ 168.6 km/h (104.8 mph)
Fuel consumption	13.3 km/L (7.5 L/100 km; 38 mpg_{‑imp}; 31 mpg_{‑US})

== Model Year Changes ==
In 2018, the CRF1000L was updated with additional riding modes, more options for the Honda Selectable Torque Control, improved intake and exhaust tuning, throttle by wire and other refinements. That was also the year Honda introduced the Africa Twin Adventure Sports variant, which got a bigger gas tank, 18” rear wheel, longer suspension travel (9.9” front / 9.4” rear) and more wind protection in addition to all the other upgrades.

=== CRF1100L ===
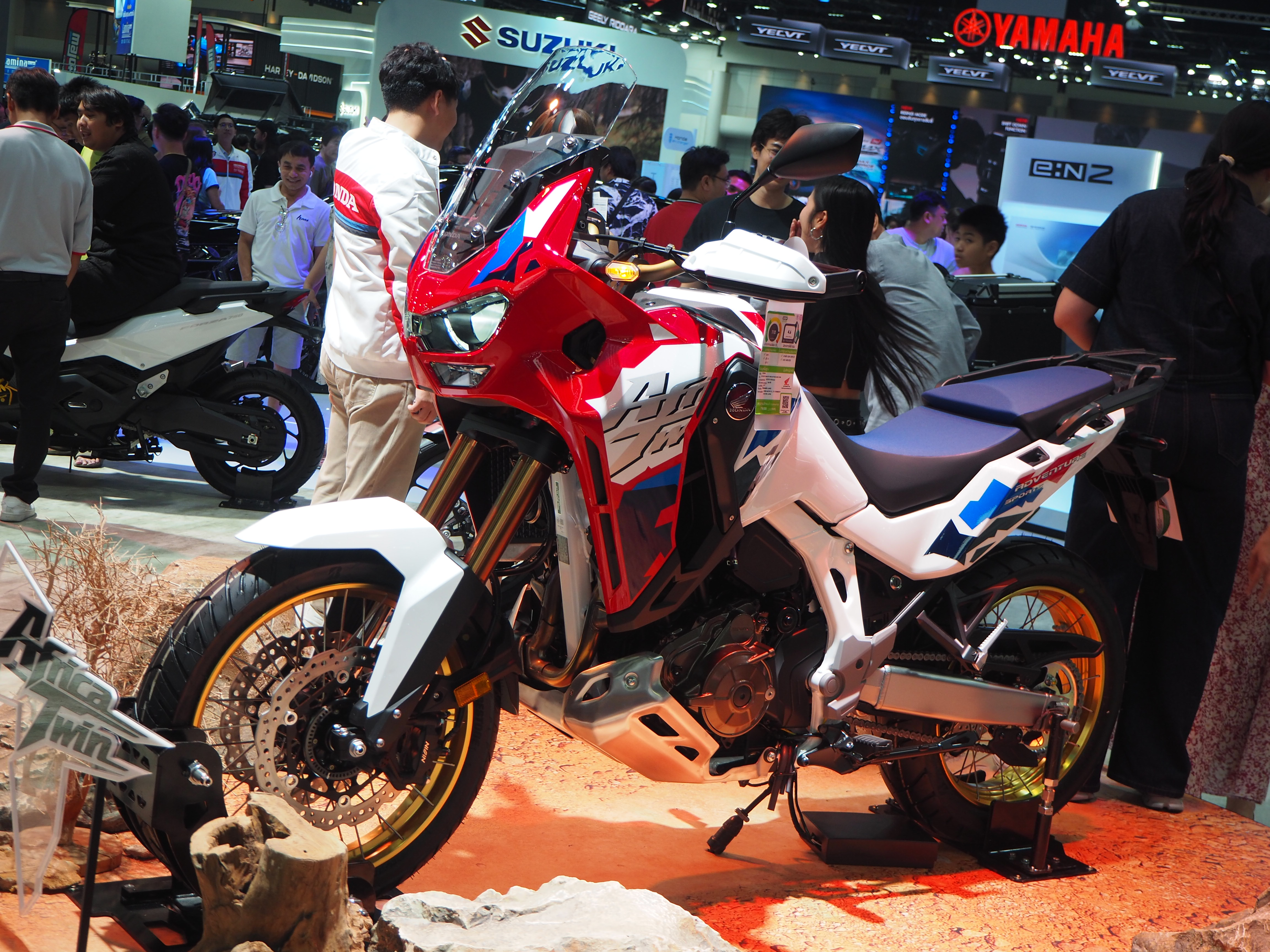
2026 CRF1100L Adventure Sports

In 2020, Honda released the CRF1100L. The bike is significantly revised, with a new engine, suspension, frame and swingarm, a brand new instrument display/rider interface, and many other changes. The new six-axis IMU offers more data and many more ride modes, wheelie control, torque control, and more. The new rider interface offers more screens of data, bluetooth and Apple CarPlay. There is also cruise control added (and controlled within the rider interface).

The Adventure Sports model was reduced in height to match the standard model, received electronically adjustable suspension, and tubeless rims.

The new 1084 cc engine (previously 998 cc) has a host of changes including increased displacement by a 6.5 mm increase in stroke, new pistons, crank and cams with longer intake and exhaust-valve lifts (the intake is up from 9.2 mm to 10.1 mm while the exhaust is increased from 8.6 mm to 9.3 mm). The throttle body is 2 mm larger at 46 mm, the intake tract is straightened, and the ECU has new fueling mapping.

In late 2021, Honda released a software update that adds Android Auto to the 2020 and 2021 models. Originally they only supported Apple CarPlay.

In 2022, Honda made a few subtle changes. Both models receive new colors and graphics. Both models support both Apple CarPlay and Android Auto. The regular (non AS) model received as standard equipment the rear aluminum luggage rack that was previously only included on the AS models. The AS models have a new 110 mm shorter windscreen that improves visibility and has 5 adjustable positions.

The DCT transmission received optimized first and second gears for smoother movement from a stop and at low speeds. Honda continues to invest in the DCT option and stated in 2020 it accounted for 47% of sales.

The 2023 Africa Twin is unchanged except for new color options. Offered in Matte Ballistic Black Metallic, Glint Wave Blue Metallic Tricolor scheme, or the prior year Grand Prix Red.

The 2024 Africa Twin and Adventure Sport are receiving a "significant makeover". The base engine the same 1084 cc parallel twin power plant but the compression ratio was increased from 10.1:1 to 10.5:1, which alongside changes to the valve timing, intake ports and ECU settings increased the torque and brings it earlier. A 7% increase in maximum torque, now 82.6 ft-lbs, is delivered earlier at 5,500 rpm from 6,250 rpm. They also include a new muffler, and DCT shifting improvements especially at low speed and during cornering. The front fairings were redesigned to improve aero and wind deflection. The base model (non AS) ES trim also includes heated grips and a charging socket. Also now has optional Showa EERA electronic suspension which was previously only found on the AS model.

=== CRF1150L ===
The CRF1150L was unveiled in November 2026.

2027 CRF1150L

2027 CRF1150L Adventure Sports

2027 CRF1150L Enduro Sports
