= Honda XL125V Varadero =

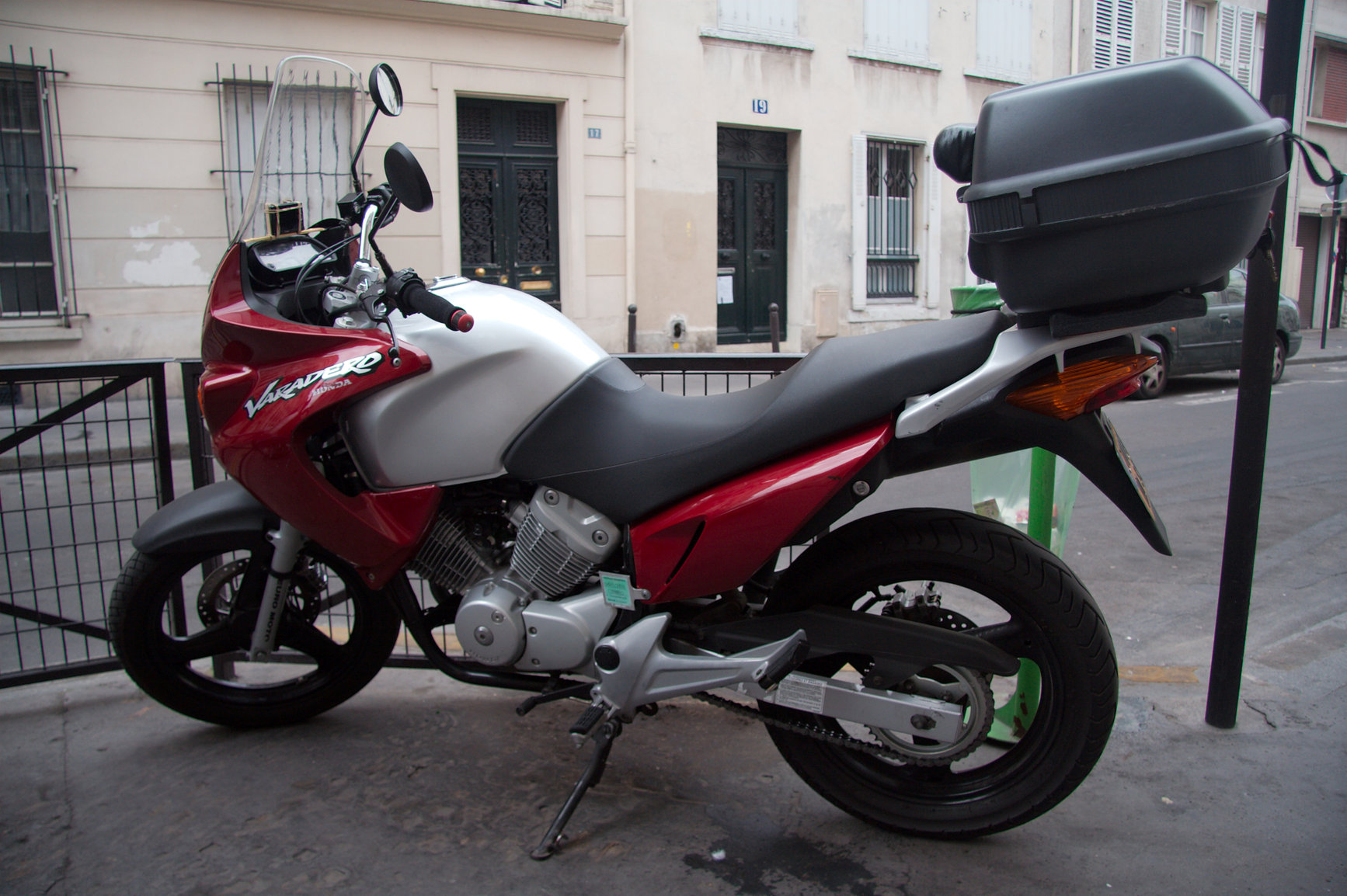
- Manufacturer: Honda
- Production: 2001-2015
- Engine: Liquid cooled, 4-stroke, 4-valve, SOHC, 124 cc, 90° V-twin
- Bore / stroke: 42 mm × 45 mm (1.7 in × 1.8 in)
- Compression ratio: 11.8:1
- Power: 10.6 kW (14.2 hp)
- Torque: 10 N⋅m (7.4 lbf⋅ft)
- Transmission: 5-speed chain drive manual
- Suspension: Front: 35 mm Telescopic Forks; Rear: Adjustable Mono-shock
- Brakes: Front: disc / Rear: disc
- Wheelbase: 1,450 mm (57 in)
- Dimensions: L: 2,150 mm (85 in); W: 883 mm (34.8 in); H: 1,250 mm (49 in)
- Seat height: 802 mm (31.6 in)
- Weight: 2001–2006 149 kg (328 lb); 2007– 152 kg (335 lb) (dry); 169 kg (373 lb) (wet)
- Fuel capacity: 2001–2006 17.5 L (3.8 imp gal; 4.6 US gal); 2007– 16.8 L (3.7 imp gal; 4.4 US gal)
- Oil capacity: 1.2 L (1.3 US qt)
- Related: XL1000V Varadero

The Honda XL125V Varadero is a dual-sport motorcycle with a 125 cc four stroke V-twin engine, produced in two generations by Honda from 2001 to 2015.

== Model history ==
=== 2001–2007 ===
The first generation of the Varadero 125 was released in the UK in 2001 aimed at the beginner rider market. Honda began working on a larger 125 motorcycle after the 15 metric horsepower restriction on all 125 cc motorcycles, with a marketing study suggesting that riders involved in this market were attracted by the idea of what Honda called a dual-sport motorcycle, which benefited from a protective nose fairing.

Borrowing design cues from the existing XL1000V Varadero, Honda set about developing a bike that offered substantially bigger proportions than most 125 cc motorcycles, with a seat height of 802 mm (31.6 in), ensuring that the rider would gain not only a commanding road view but also ensure the motorcycle was capable of offering genuine pillion access. The XL125V had a fuel capacity of 17.5 L (3.8 imp gal; 4.6 US gal), which included a 2-litre reserve – larger than most other 125 cc motorcycles.

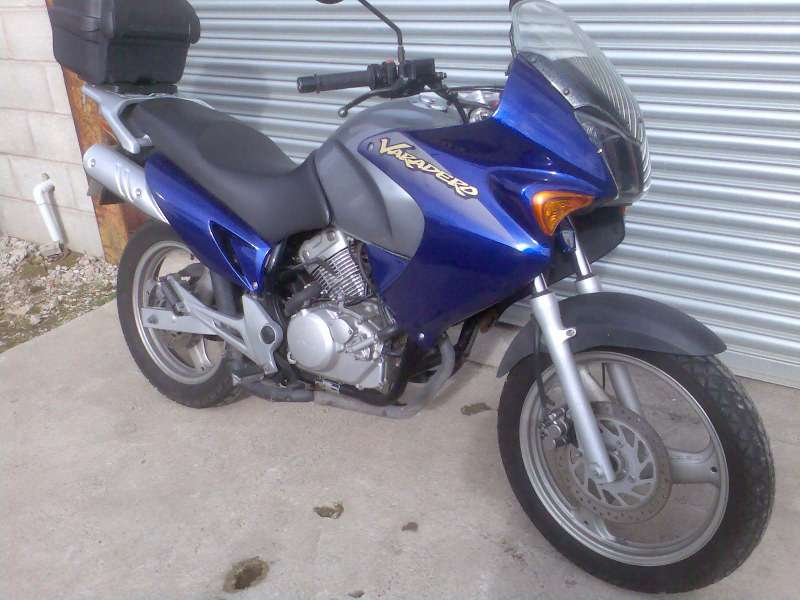
2004 XL125V Varadero

Following the cues taken from the XL1000V Varadero, Honda chose to power the new model with the 124 cc 4-stroke SOHC 4v 90° V-twin engine that was originally developed for the VT125C Shadow cruiser motorcycle. The engine developed the new maximum 10.7 kW (14.3 hp) allowed by the new restriction, as well as 10.8 N⋅m (8.0 lbf⋅ft) of torque. The new bike was fuelled through carburetors. The Varadero 125 engine revs to over 12,000 rpm; higher than most V-twin engines. It develops peak power at around 11,000 rpm, while in contrast its stablemate, the XL1000V Varadero, peaks its power at 6,000 rpm.

The engine sat in an all-new tubular steel frame designed for the new model, however the cast aluminium box-section swing arm was taken from the XL650V Transalp motorcycle (as was the rear luggage rack) and equipped with mono-shock rear suspension that provides 150 mm (5.9 in) of travel. Front suspension is provided by 35 mm forks, also with 150 mm of travel.

The Varadero 125 was released with some fanfare, with Honda calling it the "new flagship of Honda's diverse 125 lineup" in the press information. There were also plenty of positive reviews of the new model, with most only citing the high price as the only criticism. The new Varadero 125 reportedly sold well with MCN reporting in January 2002 that it had sold over 380 units, roughly the same as its two bigger stablemates the XL1000V Varadero and the XL650V Transalp.

In 2003 the XL125V Varadero was given a minor facelift. The main being the three spoke, cast aluminium wheels being changed from black to silver in colour.

=== Since 2007 ===
After the introduction of the Euro III Emission standards, the XL125V Varadero would either have needed to be withdrawn from production or modified. In 2007, Honda elected to continue with the model and so developed a new electronic fuel injection system based on the PGM-FI system used by other Honda motorcycles. At this time Honda also decided to bring about a major restyle to bring the model in line with company appearance trends at the time. The changes included a restyled front fairing which includes wind screen, indicators and headlight, an all new dashboard which now included a fuel reserve warning light and new fairing mounted wing mirrors, previously handlebar mounted.

Mechanically, the 2007 XL125V Varadero is similar to the previous model with the engine, gearbox, swing arm and rear suspension, luggage rack and steering all interchangeable as well as parts such as starter-motors, spark plugs and brakes also being interchangeable. However, the air intake has been turned through 90 degrees to be front facing and the fuel tank capacity has been reduced slightly to accommodate the new fuel injection system and ECU control unit. The fuel tank is around 0.5 litres smaller at 16.8 litres (3.7 imp gal; 4.4 US gal).

To enable the bike to meet the new emission standards, the engine is now fuel-injected, is slightly de-tuned and has a catalytic converter. The 124 cc 4-valve V-twin now has better efficiency around 3.3 liters per 100 km and produces a bit less power at 10.6 kW (14.2 hp)

The Varadero 125 is discontinued since 2015

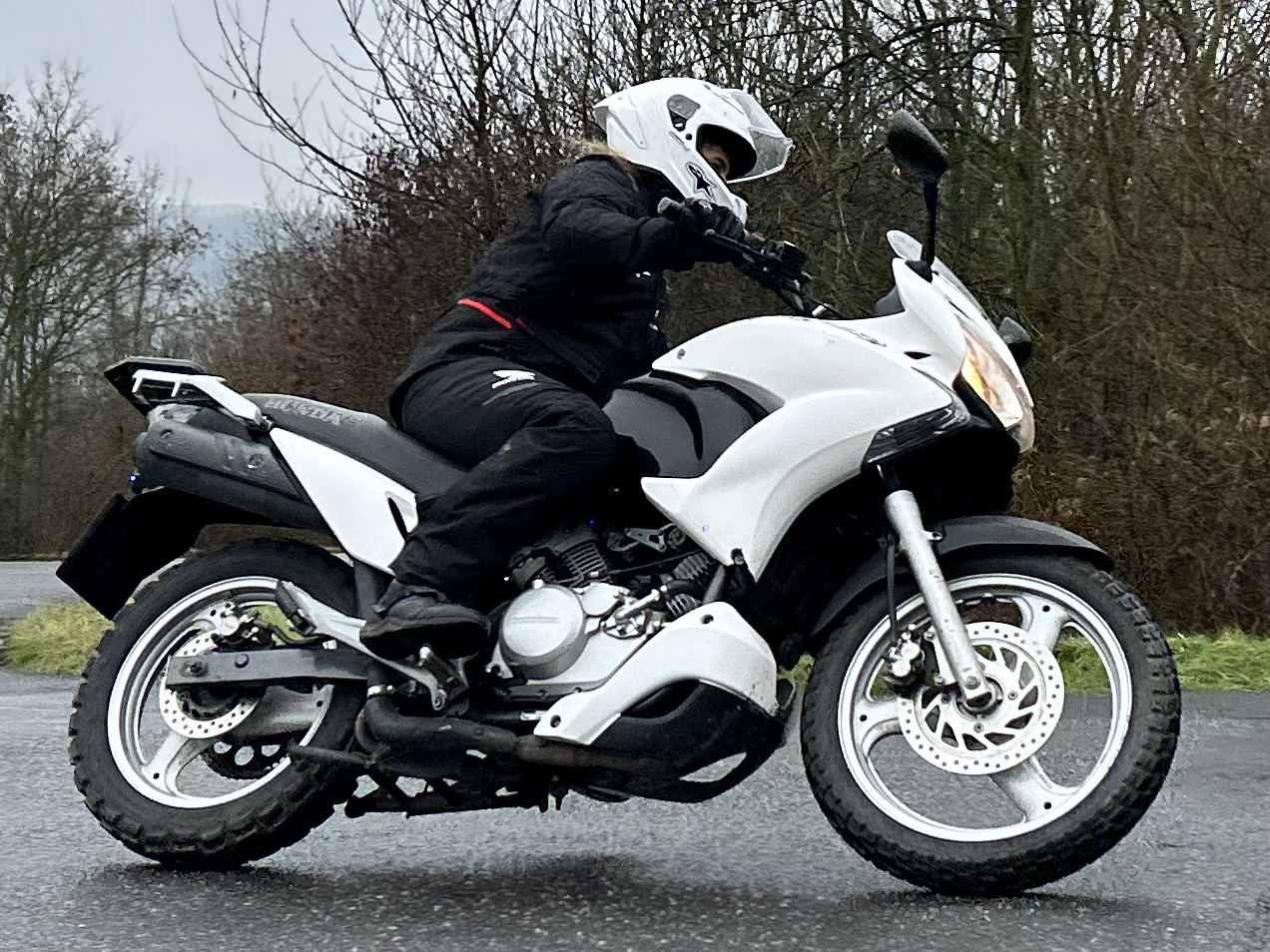
A 2007 model in a lean

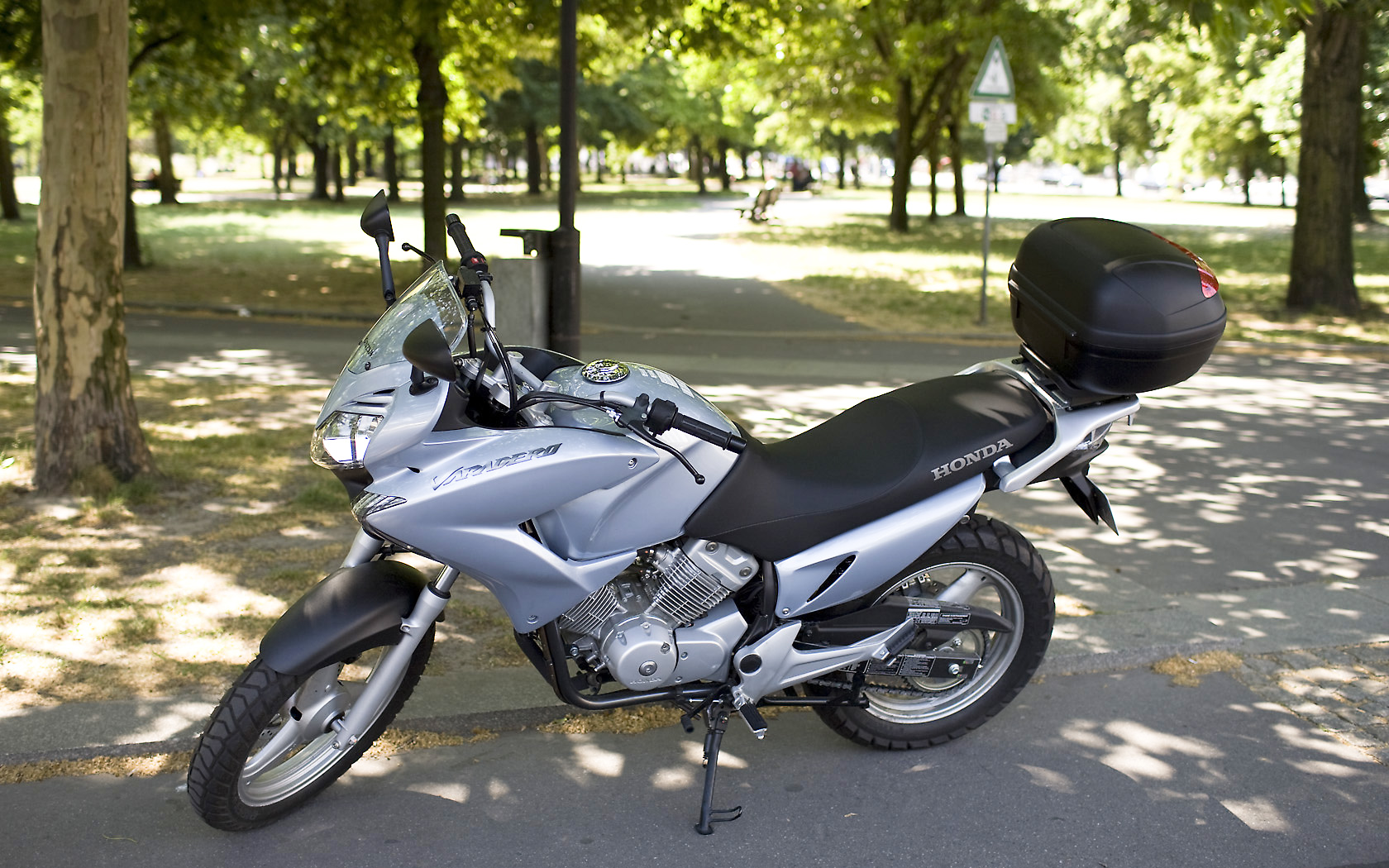
2007 XL125V Varadero

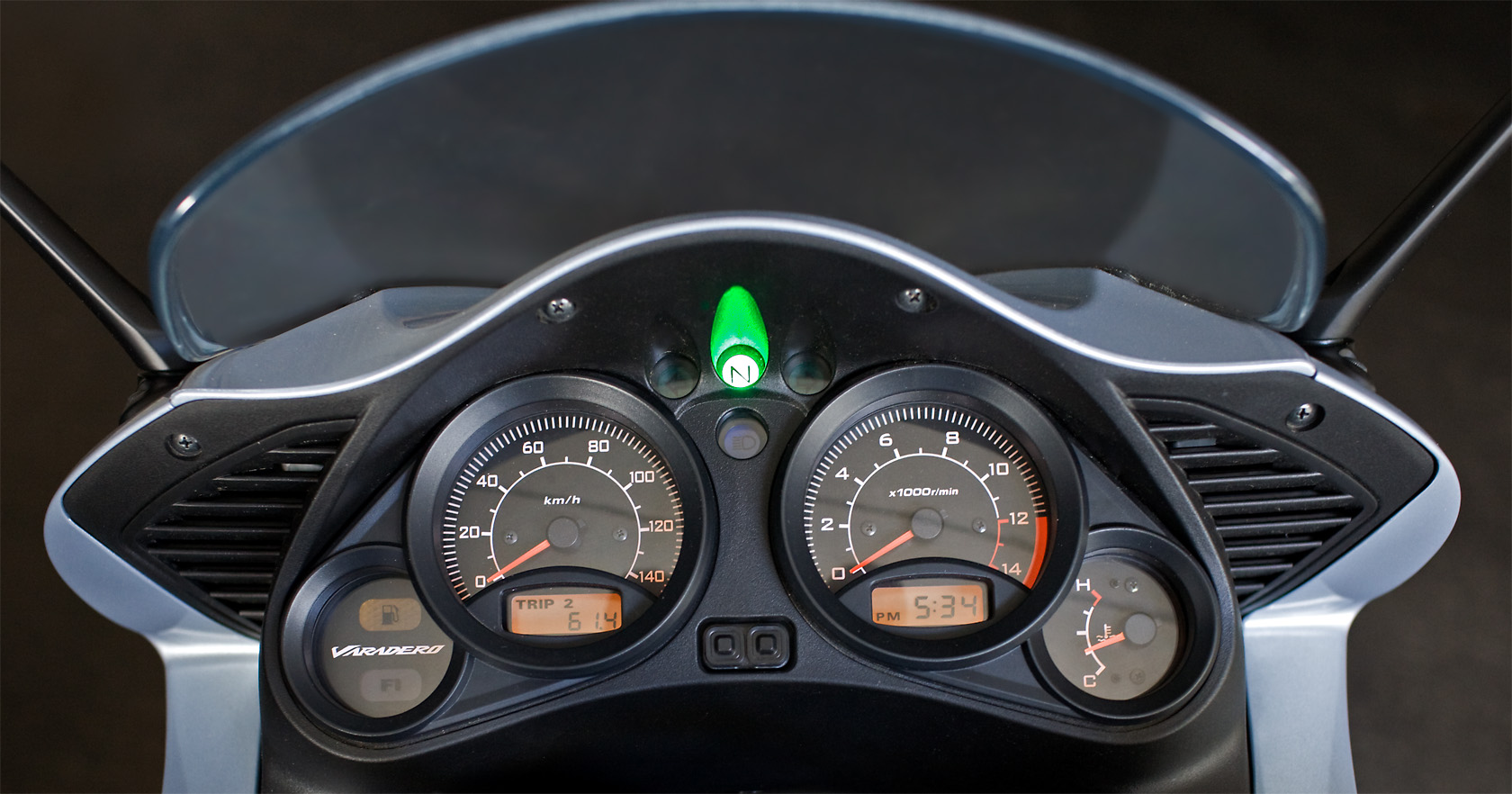
Post-2007 Varadero 125 Cockpit
