= Honda XRV750 =

XRV750T
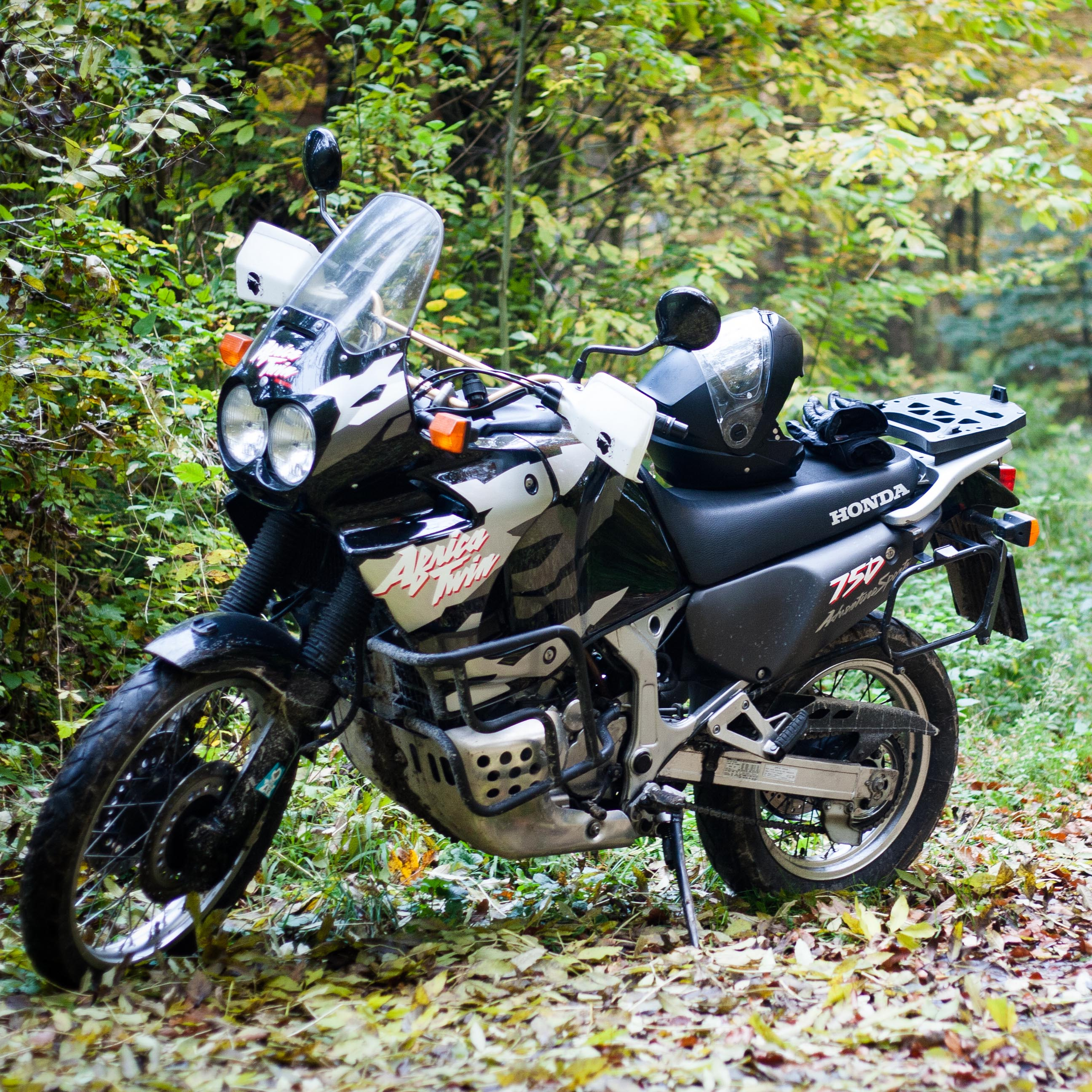
- Manufacturer: Honda
- Also called: Africa Twin
- Production: 1989–2003
- Predecessor: Honda XRV650
- Successor: Honda CRF1000
- Class: Dual-sport
- Engine: 742 cc (45.3 cu in) 52° V-twin, SOHC, 6-valve
- Bore / stroke: 81.0 mm × 72.0 mm (3.19 in × 2.83 in)
- Compression ratio: 9.0:1
- Power: 45.3 kW (60.7 hp)@ 7,500 rpm
- Torque: 62.7 N⋅m (46.2 lbf⋅ft)@ 6,000 rpm
- Ignition type: CDI with electronic advance
- Transmission: 5-speed manual, chain final drive
- Frame type: Single downtube with double-loop cradle, rectangular section, steel
- Suspension: Front: 43 mm air-assisted telescopic fork, 220 mm wheel travel Rear: Pro-Link 214 mm wheel travel with preload and compression damping adjustment
- Brakes: Front: twin disc 276 mm, 2 piston calipers Rear: single disc 256 mm, 1 piston caliper
- Tires: Front: 90/90 D21; Rear: 140/80 R17
- Dimensions: L: 2,315 mm (91.1 in) to 2,380 mm (94 in); W: 905 mm (35.6 in); H: 1,243 mm (48.9 in)
- Seat height: 860 mm (34 in)
- Fuel capacity: 23 L (5.1 imp gal; 6.1 US gal)

The XRV750 Africa Twin was a 742 cc (45.3 cu in) dual-sport first launched in December 1989. and based on the Honda NXR-750, which won the Paris-Dakar rally four times in the late 1980s (from 1986 to 1989).

== Description and technical ==
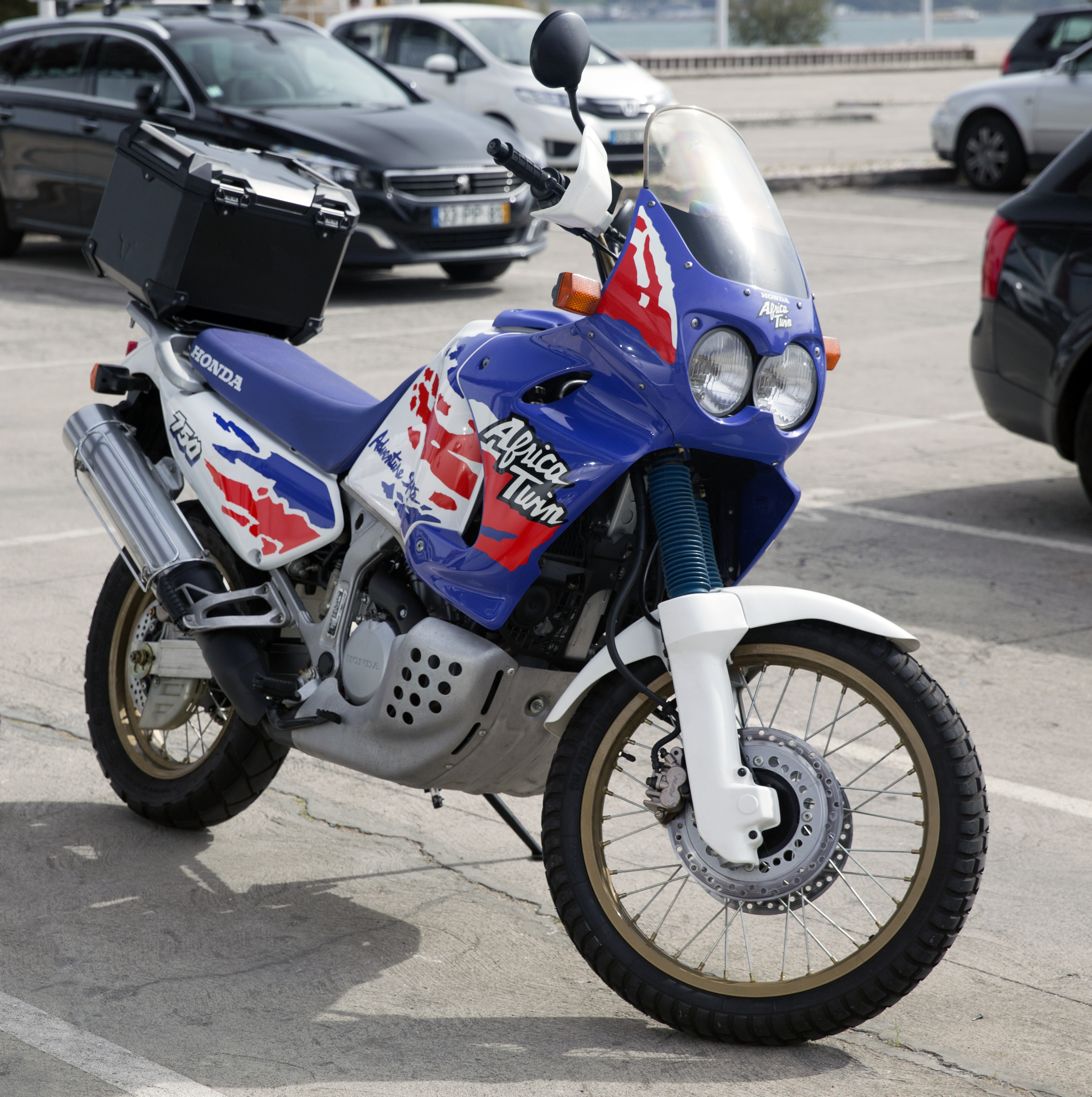
XRV750 Africa Twin 1993

It was preceded by Honda XRV650 Africa Twin, which was a lighter, higher specification version made in 1988 and 1989 by Honda Racing Corporation with a 650 cc engine producing 50 hp (37 kW). The much earlier Honda XLV750R was a shaft driven motorcycle.

Built in homage to the giant desert racers of the Paris-Dakar Rally, the Africa Twin is a large, dual sport bike, powered by a softly tuned V-twin engine. It has twin headlights, a windscreen, and a long dual seat which stretches back from the tank to an aluminium grabrail and plastic coated luggage rack. An aluminium bashplate protects the bottom of the engine from flying rocks and impacts.

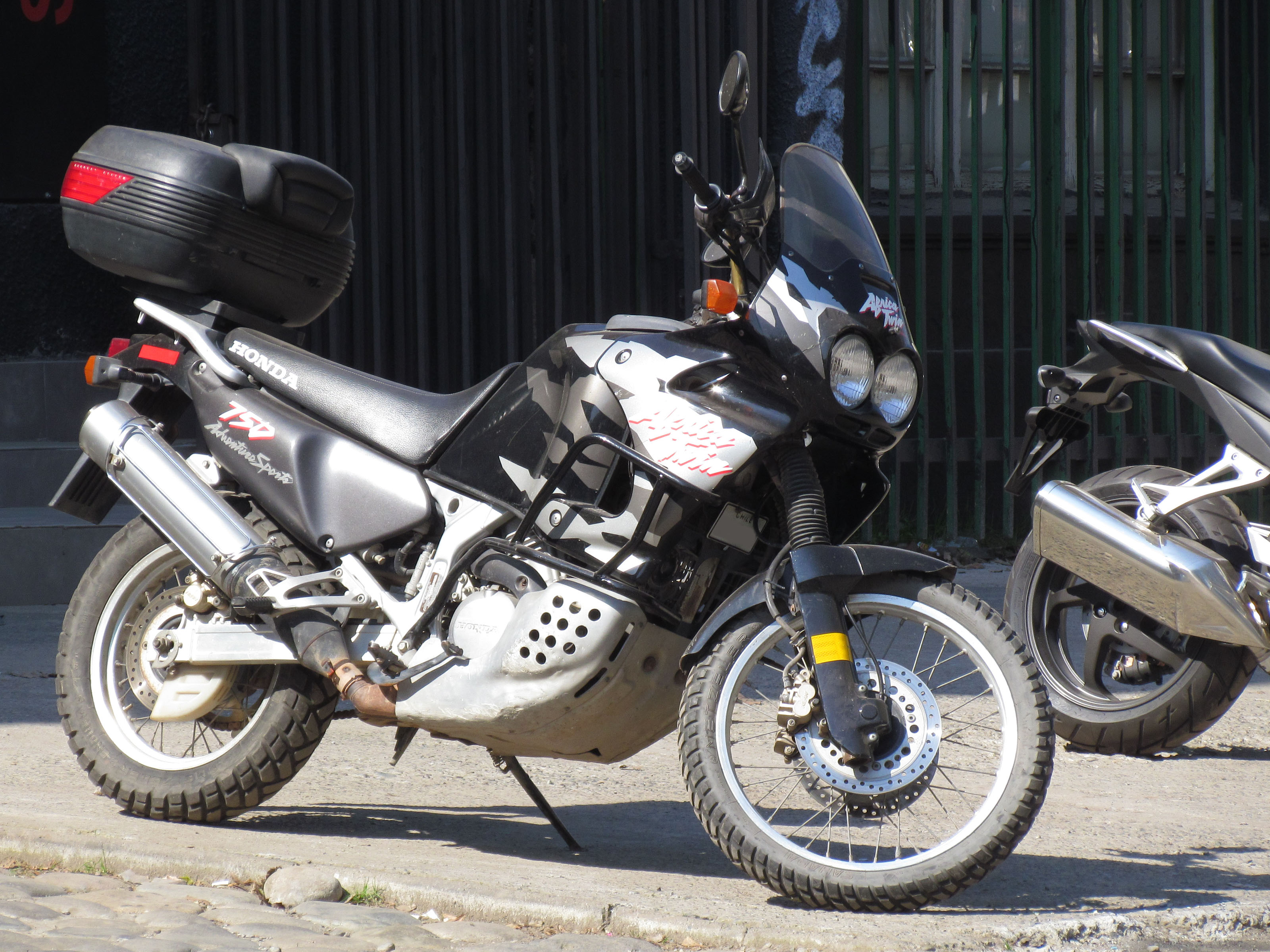
XRV 750 Africa Twin Adventure Sports

The engine is a 742 cc, liquid-cooled V-twin with a single overhead camshaft, 6-valves (3 per cylinder) and four spark plugs (2 per cylinder). The long-travel suspension insulates the rider from uneven surfaces. The brakes are twin discs at the front and single disc at the rear.

== History and update ==
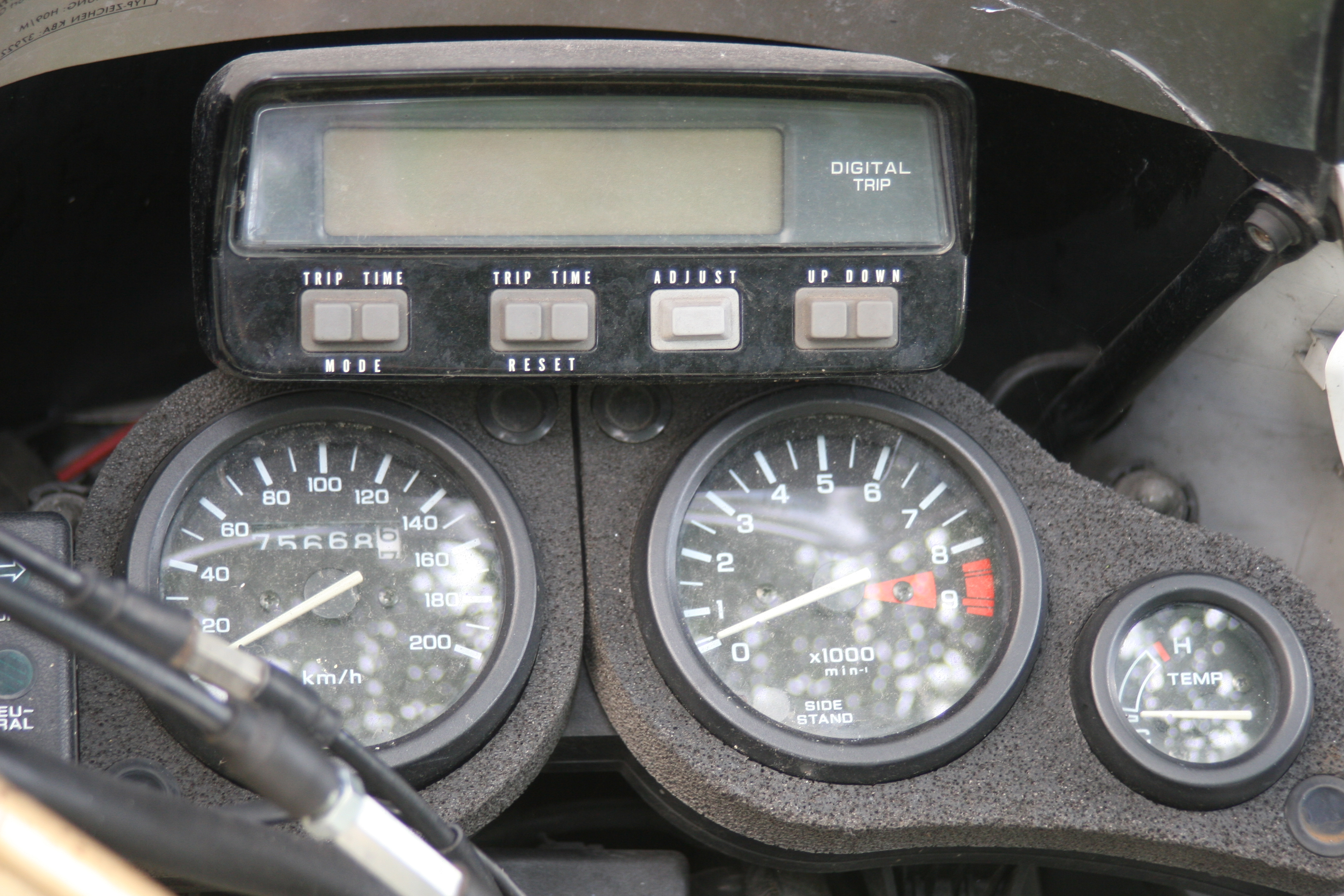
Trip Computer of XRV

In December 1989 the original Honda XRV750 Africa Twin was launched, which became known as the 1990 model. In 1990 was updated. In 1992 the Tripmaster computer was added. In 1993 the motorcycle had a major redesign including new frame, body work plastics, fuel tank, engine modifications and a lower seat. Nevertheless, it gained weight slightly. In 1996 the XRV gained an improved seat and clutch, larger silencer, modified upper fairing and luggage rack. However, the rear shock absorber lost some of its adjustability. In 2000 the Honda XRV750 Africa Twin ceased production. XRVs still in the showrooms were sold and registered until 2003 but there is no XRV with a VIN that is newer than 2000. Nowadays good second hand examples are very much sought after among aficionados. Several aftermarket products exist with which to equip the bike such as crash bars to protect the vehicle's plastics and tank from damage in a low speed fall.

The later XRV's instruments feature a large trip computer LCD display mounted above the conventional speedometer and tachometer, styled like Dakar racers' navigational displays, and incorporates a range of extra electronic timers and trip meters.

== Specifications ==
XRV750 Africa Twin
	L to N models (1990 to 1992)	P to S models (1993 to 1995)	T models onwards (1996 on)
Overall length	2315 to 2380 mm		
Overall width	895 mm	905 mm	
Overall height	1,420 mm	1430 mm	
Wheelbase	1,565 mm		
Seat height	880 mm	860 mm	870 mm
Weight (dry)	209 kg	205 kg	
Fuel tank capacity (including reserve)	24 litres	23 litres	
Wheels	Front 21-inch spoke, aluminium rim 1.85x21" Rear 17-inch spoke, aluminium rim 2.75x17" and 3.00x17"		
Tyres	Front 90/90-21 54S; Rear 130/90-17 65S	Front 90/90-21 54S; Rear 140/80-R17 69H	

== Later versions ==
Africa Twins were originally built with a V-twin layout, but Honda CRF1000L uses a parallel twin engine with a 270° crossplane crankshaft (as pioneered by the Yamaha TRX850). The new engine was cheaper to build, lighter and more compact, allowing both a shorter wheelbase and easier placement of inlet and exhaust manifolds. Also, the 270° engine's "big bang" concept allows excellent rear wheel grip to the track surface.
