= Motortrade =

Philippine motorcycle dealership

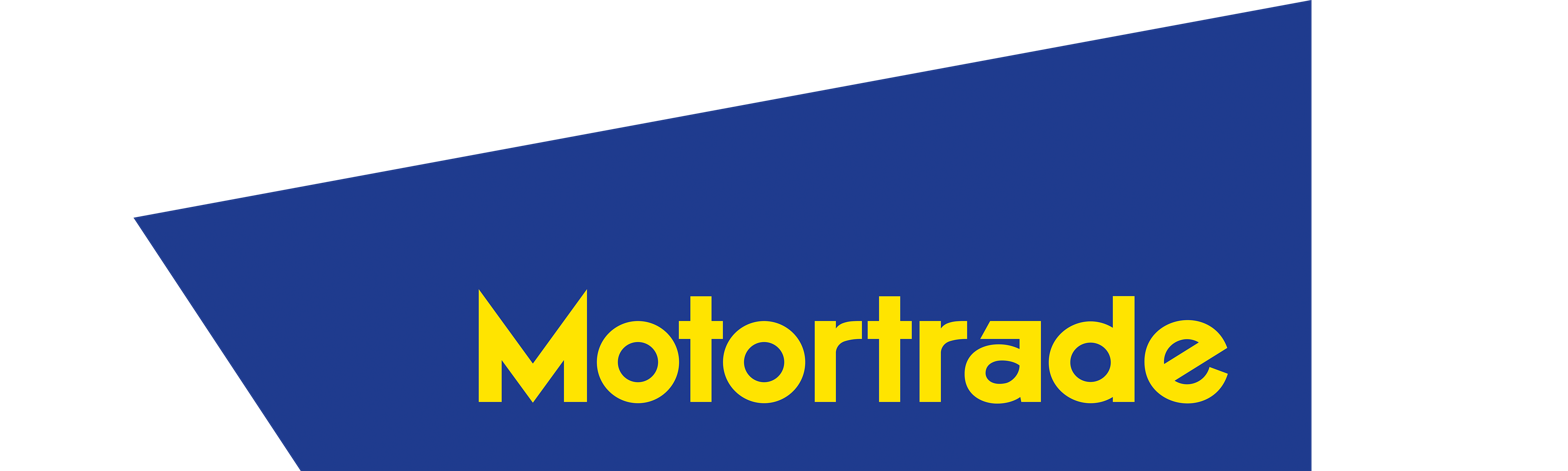
- Company type: Conglomerate
- Industry: Motorcycle
- Founded: 1969 (as Bicol Supply Center); December 27, 1979 (registered in SEC)
- Founder: Vicente Ongtenco
- Headquarters: Quezon City, Philippines
- Area served: Philippines
- Key people: Paulino C. Ongtenco (President)
- Products: Motorcycles and parts
- Services: Motorcycle repair
- Website: www.motortrade.com.ph

Motortrade Nationwide Corporation, branded as Motortrade and sometimes incorrectly called simply as Motortrade Philippines, is a Philippine-based conglomerate engaged in motorcycle dealership, sales and repair, and loans services.

== History ==
Established as Bicol Supply Center in 1969 by Chinese-Filipino migrant Vicente Ongtenco, it initially offered motorcycle spare parts and hardware components in Daet, Camarines Norte. The business grew and shifted towards a motorcycle retail business and was eventually incorporated by the Securities and Exchange Commission (SEC) on December 27, 1979, as Motortrade Nationwide Corporation.

In 2011, Motortrade ranked top 300 in BIR's list of top taxpaying corporations in the Philippines.

== Branches ==
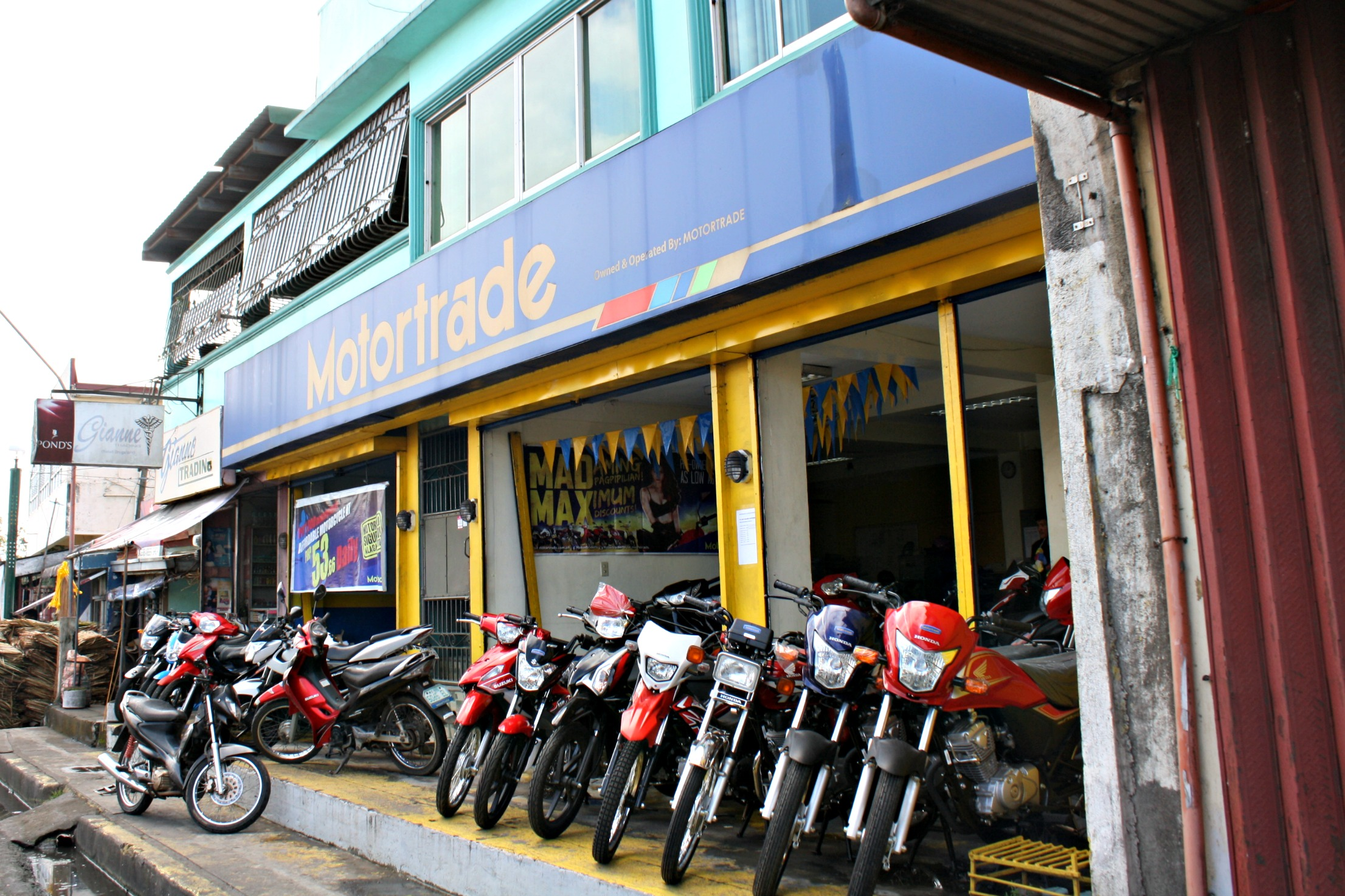
Motortrade branch in Nabua, Camarines Sur.

Motortrade currently has over 700 branches in Luzon and Visayas, with an additional 200 branches in Mindanao managed by a subsidiary company, Motorjoy Depot Inc. (MDI). Aside from multi-brand stores, Motortrade also operates brand-specific stores such as Honda (operated as Honda Prestige), Yamaha, Suzuki, leisure bike units of KTM and Kawasaki. Bank of Makati, a sister company, provides motorcycle loans and financing for Motortrade customers.

=== Brands carried ===
The company carries top Japanese motorcycle brands such as Honda, Kawasaki, Suzuki, and Yamaha, alongside the Taiwanese brand Kymco, local brand PMR, and luxury bike brands such as KTM and Kawasaki Leisure Bikes.

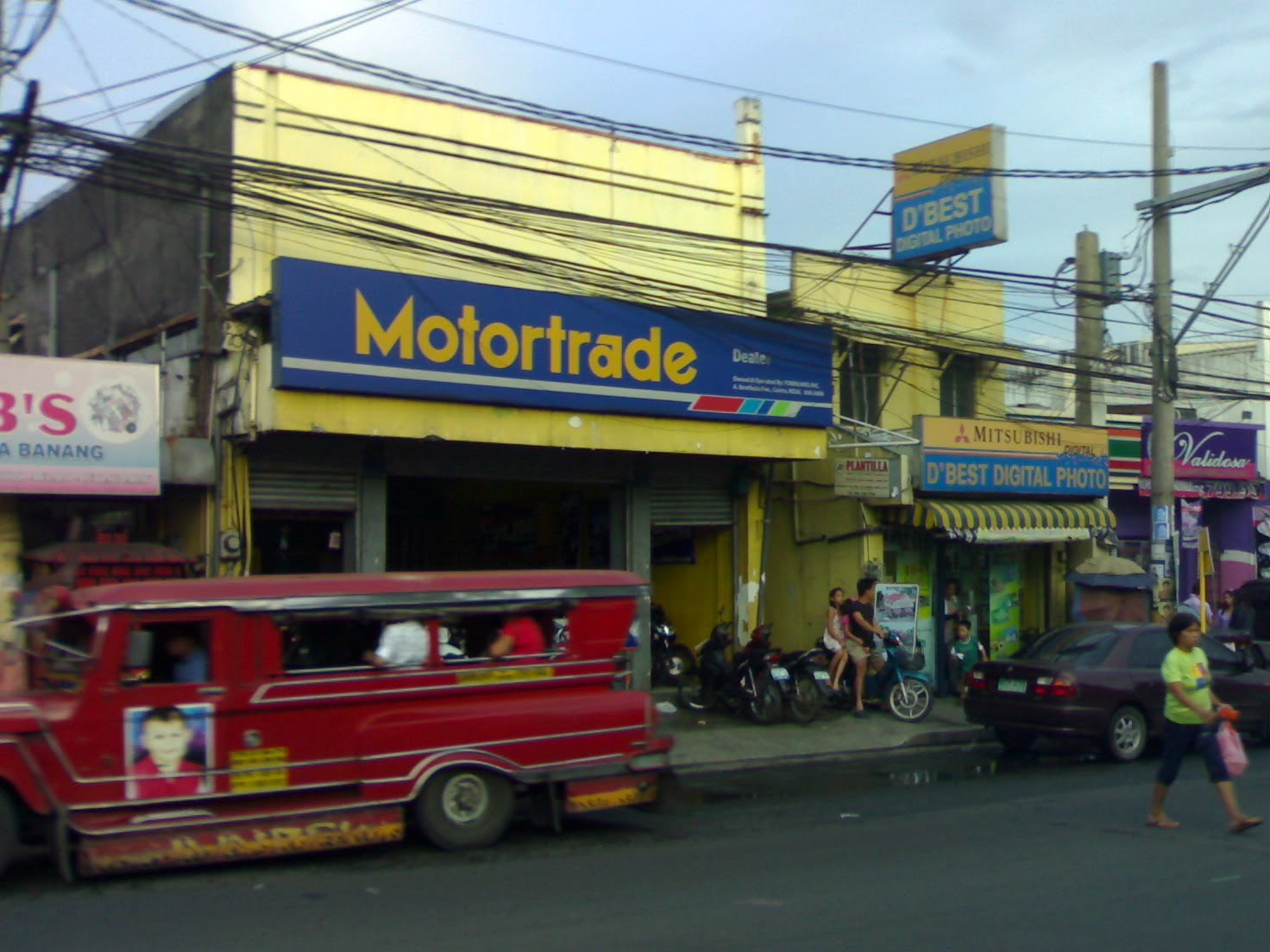
Motortrade branch in Cainta, Rizal.

=== Honda Flagship Store ===
As a longtime partner and supplier of Honda motorcycles, Motortrade opened the Honda Flagship Shop at its store in Makati last December 9, 2017. It carries the big bikes and luxury motorcycles under the Honda brand.

=== Programs ===
Motortrade pioneered the first dealership-based motorcycle riding school named Learn to Ride Safely.

== Subsidiaries ==
The company also includes other subsidiaries such as loans financing company Fundline, Northpoint Development Bank (another banking portfolio), and the real-estate arm, Transnational Properties, Inc. (TPI) managing the properties occupied by the Motortrade Group. All management shared services such as HR, accounting, and finance across the Motortrade Group of Companies are handled by Concerted Management Corporation (CMC).

=== Non-profit portfolio ===
Global Reciprocal Colleges serve as the group's first educational portfolio, while it also operates a charitable organization named Motortrade Life and Livelihood Assistance Foundation, Inc.
