= Motorjoy Depot Inc. =

Motorcycle dealers

Motortrade Mindanao
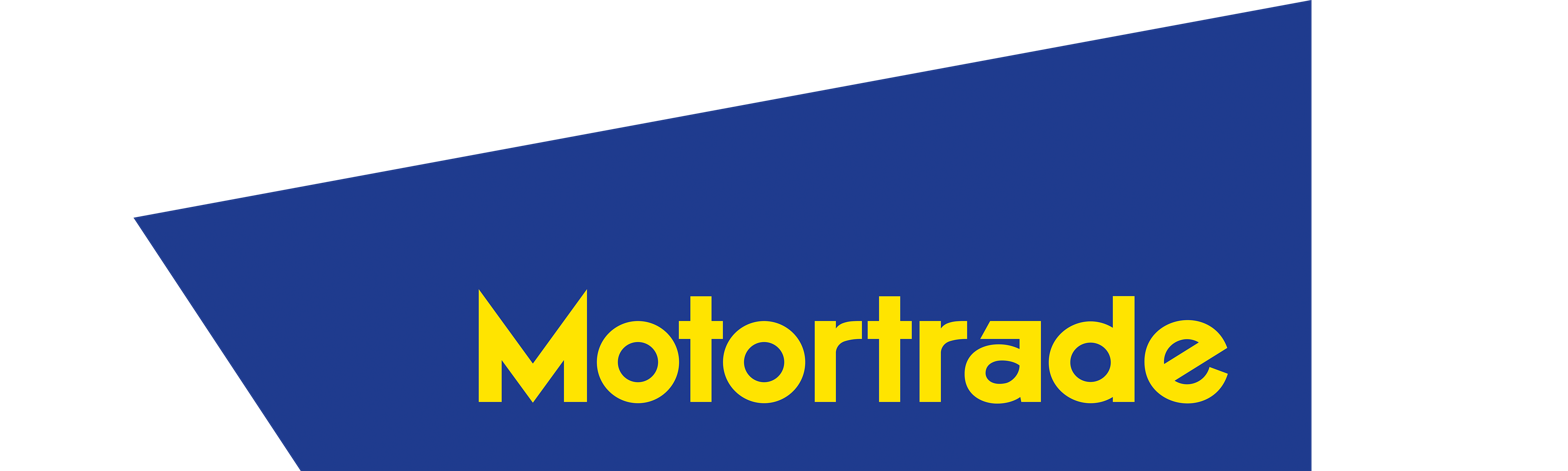
- Trade name: Motorjoy Depot Inc.
- Industry: Subsidiary
- Founded: 2009 (acquired by Motortrade)
- Headquarters: Quimpo Boulevard, Ecoland, Davao City, Philippines
- Area served: Mindanao
- Key people: Chairman: Thomas C. Ongtenco; President: Paulino C. Ongtenco
- Parent: Motortrade
- Website: Motortrade Mindanao

Motorjoy Depot Inc. (MDI), otherwise known as Motortrade Mindanao, is a Mindanao-based subsidiary of Motortrade engaged in motorcycle dealership, sales and repair, and loans services. It is Mindanao's largest motorcycle dealership; a market leader in the island.

== Branches ==
Mindanao-based Motortrade and Honda Prestige branches are separately managed by Motorjoy, around 200 branches, in order to facilitate rapid expansion in the island. The company also carries brands such as Honda, Yamaha, Suzuki, Kawasaki, Kymco, and PMR.

== Distinctions ==
Motorjoy-managed Motortrade branches in Caraga earned the distinction of being one of the most labor-compliant establishments in the region. In 2011, Motorjoy ranked top 400 in BIR's list of top taxpaying corporations in the Philippines.
