= Honda Transalp =

Dual-sport motorcycle

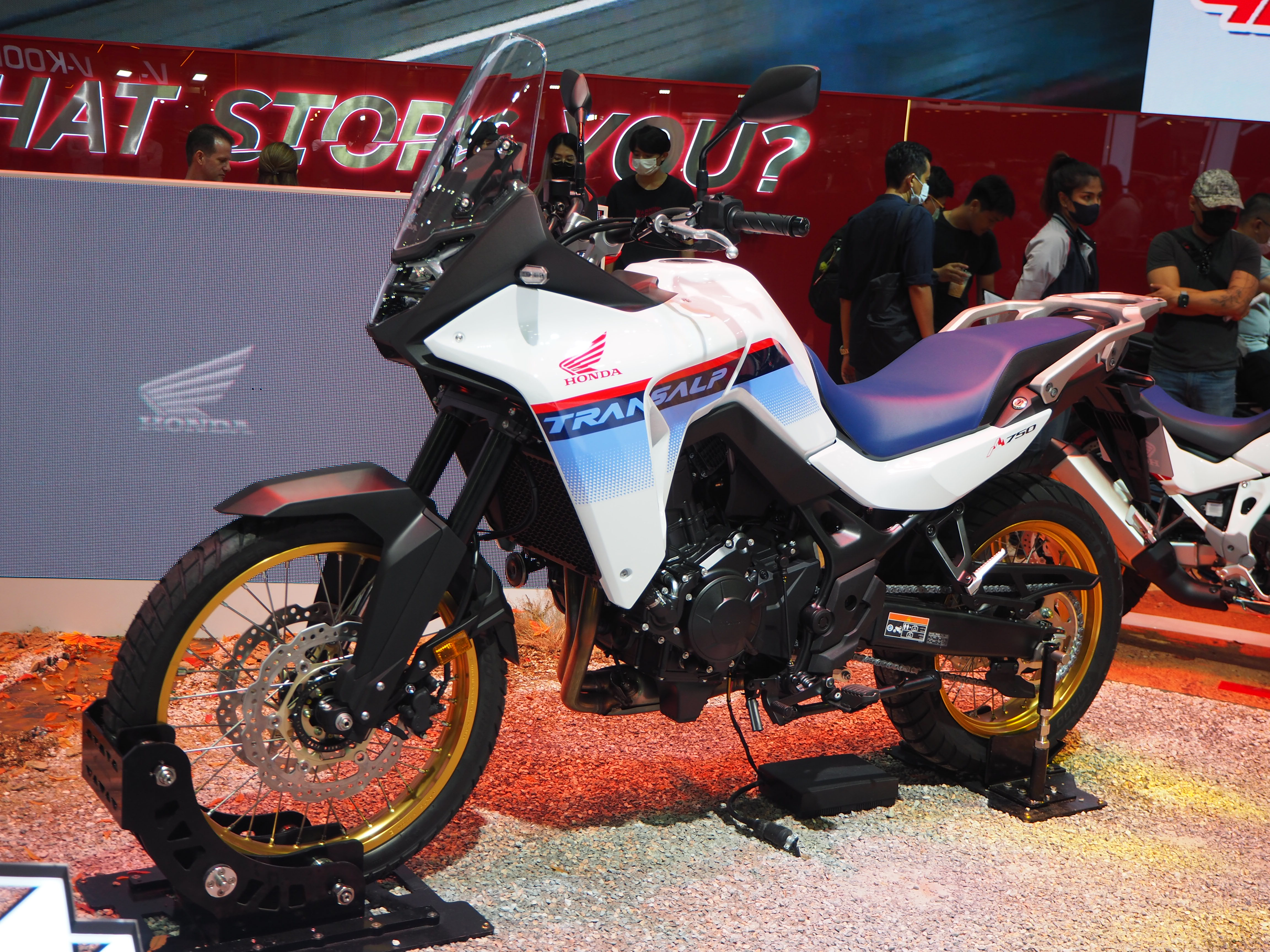
- 2023 Honda XL750 Transalp
- Manufacturer: Honda
- Also called: Honda XL400V; Honda XL600V; Honda XL650V; Honda XL700V; Honda XL750
- Production: 1987–present
- Class: Dual-sport
- Engine: Liquid-cooled, six-valve, 4-Stroke, 52° V-twin; 583 cc (35.6 cu in) (XL600V); 647 cc (39.5 cu in) (XL650V); 680 cc (41 cu in) (XL700V); Liquid-cooled, eight-valve, 4-Stroke, parallel-twin 755 cc (46.1 cu in) (XL750)
- Bore / stroke: 75 mm × 66 mm (3.0 in × 2.6 in); 79 mm × 66 mm (3.1 in × 2.6 in); 81 mm × 66 mm (3.2 in × 2.6 in); 87 mm × 63.5 mm (3.4 in × 2.5 in) (XL750)
- Top speed: 177 km/h (110 mph) (XL600V); 180 km/h (110 mph) (XL650V)
- Ignition type: Electric start
- Fuel capacity: 18 L (4.0 imp gal; 4.8 US gal)
- Related: NT650V & NT700V Deauville

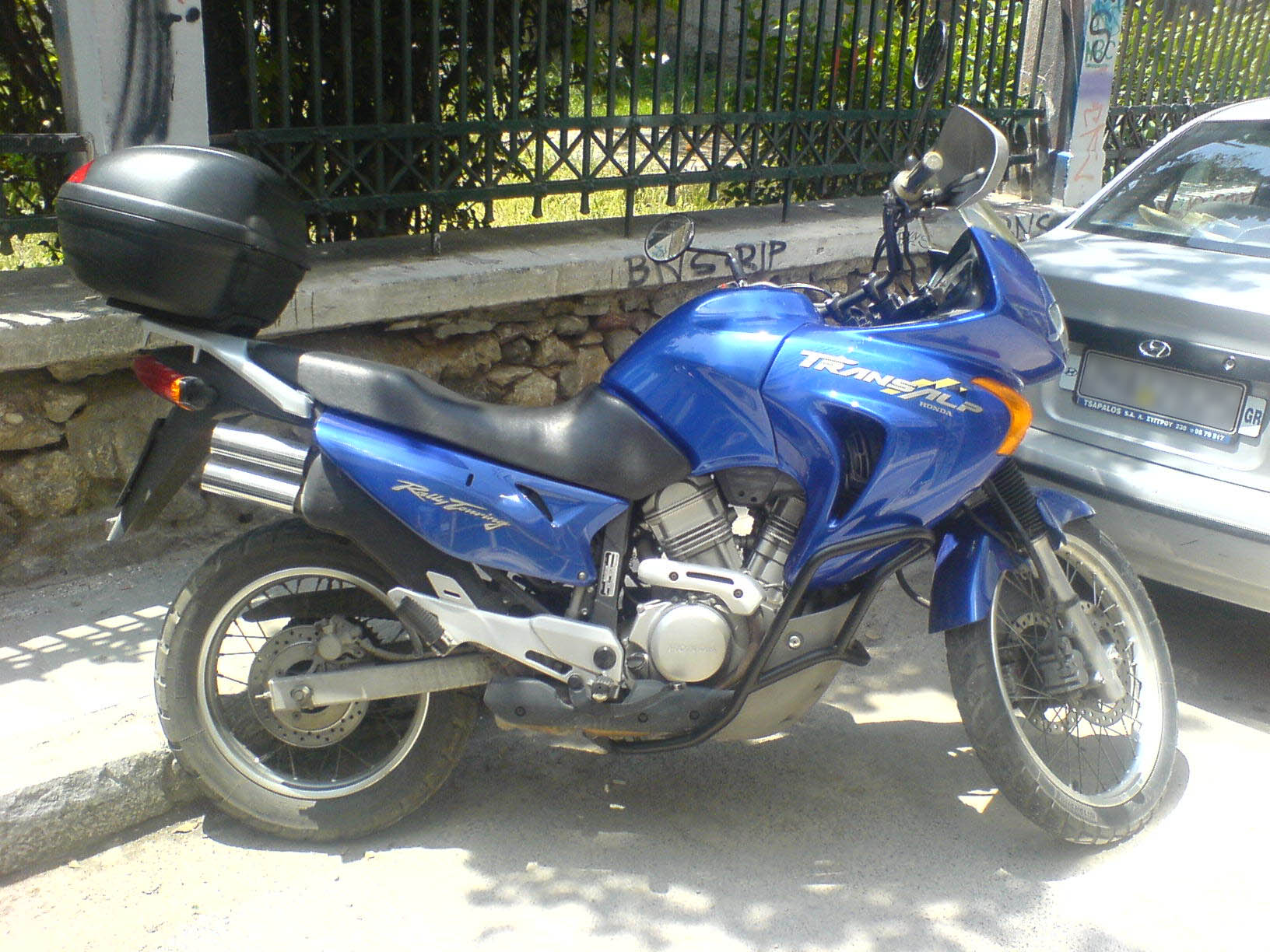
XL650V 2001

The Honda Transalp is the XL400V, XL600V, XL650V, XL700V, and XL750 series of dual-sport motorcycles manufactured in Japan by Honda since 1987. With the exception of XL750, the Transalp bikes series feature a liquid-cooled, four-stroke 52° V-twin engine.

== History ==
The first prototype was built in 1985 as an off-road motorbike with a 500 cc (31 cu in) engine. Further development introduced an increase to 600 cc (37 cu in) and more road-oriented features, notably an improved fairing.

== Models ==
The most usual models are:

- The XL600V from 1986 - available in the United States in 1989
- The XL650V from 2000
- The XL700V from 2008
- The XL750 from 2023

Other versions exist, such as the 400 cc version (ND-06) aimed at the Japanese market.

The first version output 50 hp (37 kW) at 8,000 rpm, increased to 55 hp (41 kW) for the 1989 and 1990 version. Later models returned to the original 50 hp.

From 1991, the rear drum brake was replaced by a 240 mm (9.4 in) disc brake, with a single-piston brake caliper.

The appearance was altered in 1994: the original square lights were changed, and a new fairing was introduced.

In 1996, new 34 mm carburetors were introduced, and the CDI ignition system was replaced by a microprocessor-driven design.

The front brake was modified in 1997, introducing a second disc and reducing the diameter to 256 mm (10.1 in).

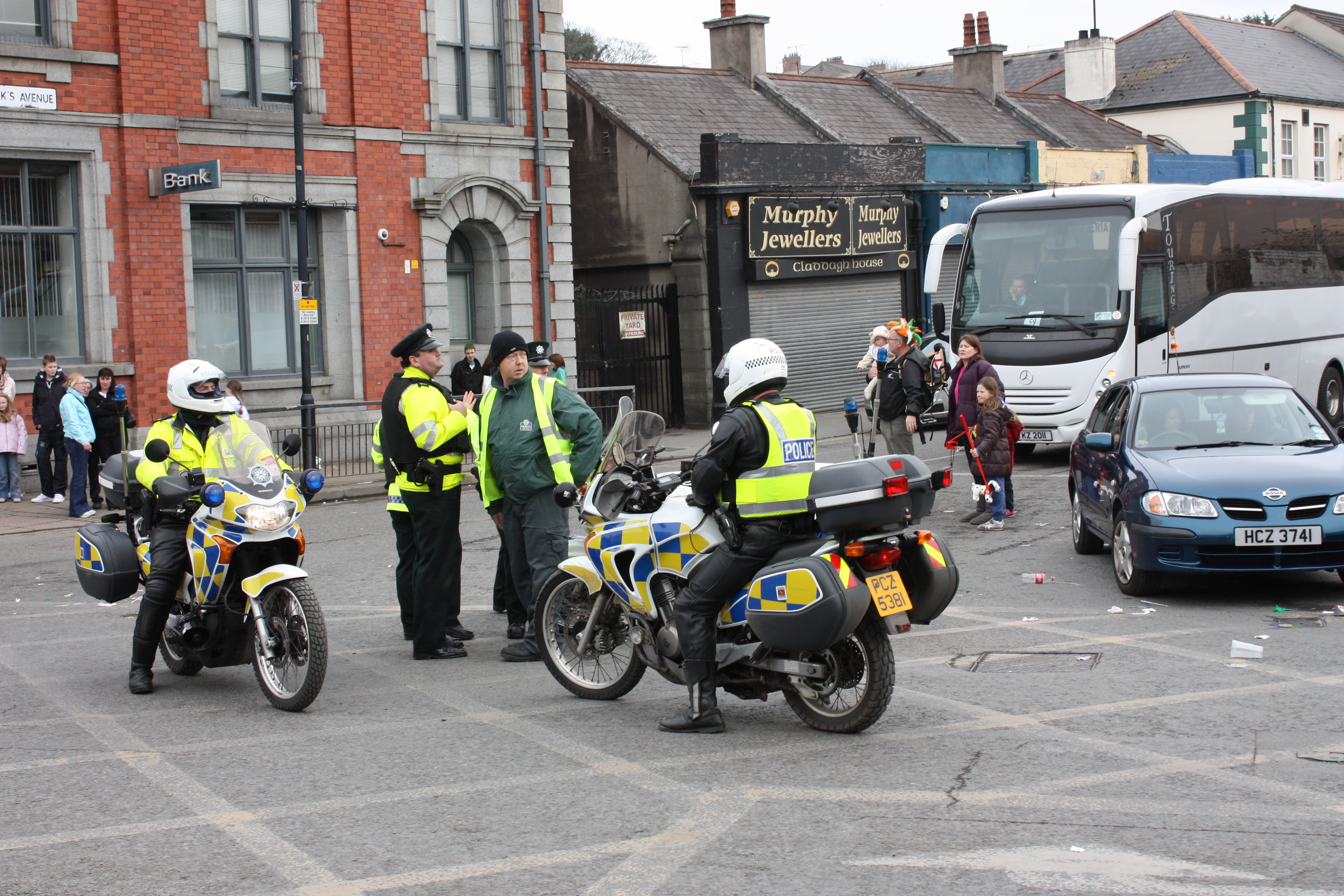
The Police of Northern Ireland on XL650V

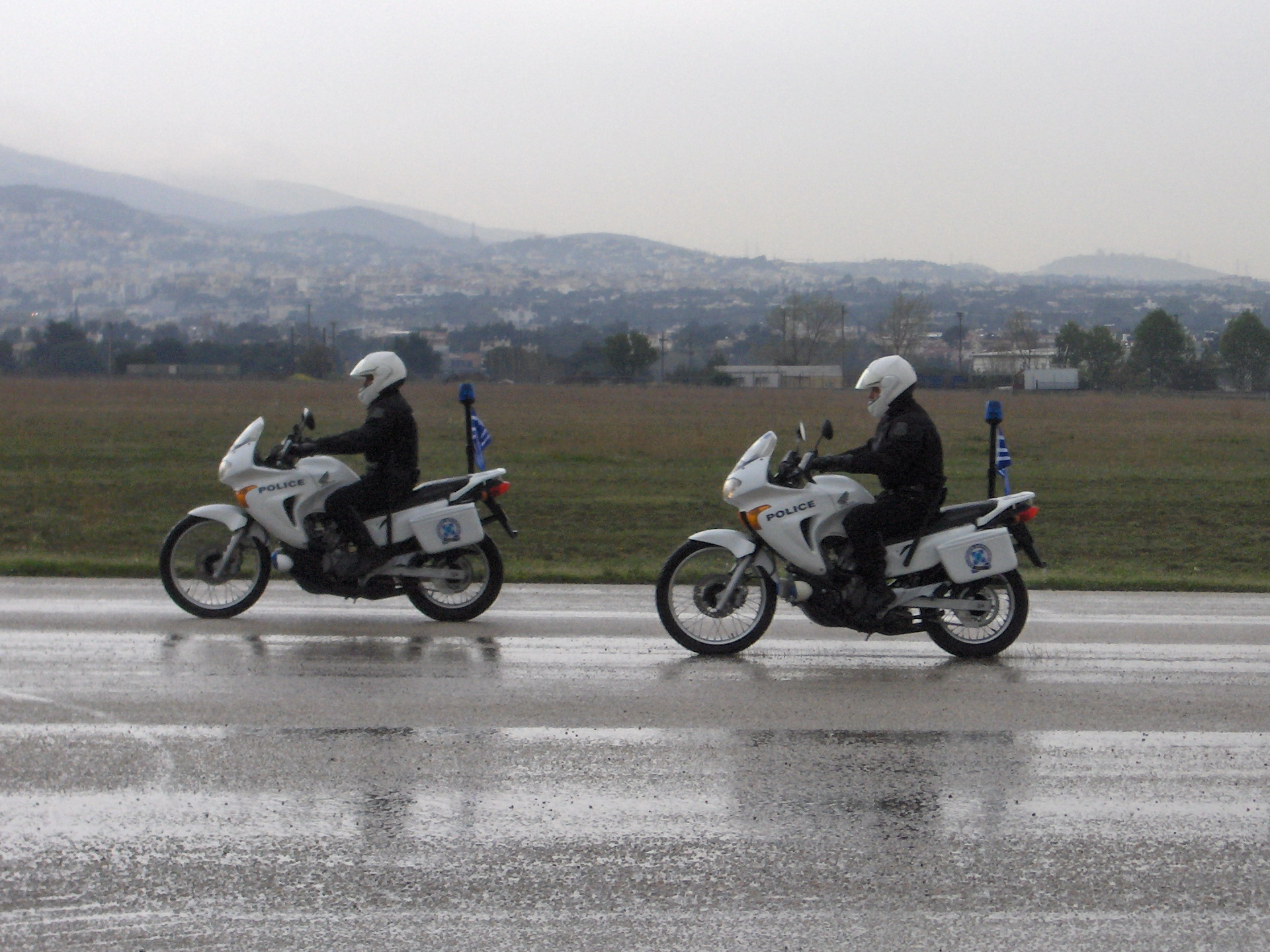
Transalp 650 is the motorcycle of the Greek Police.

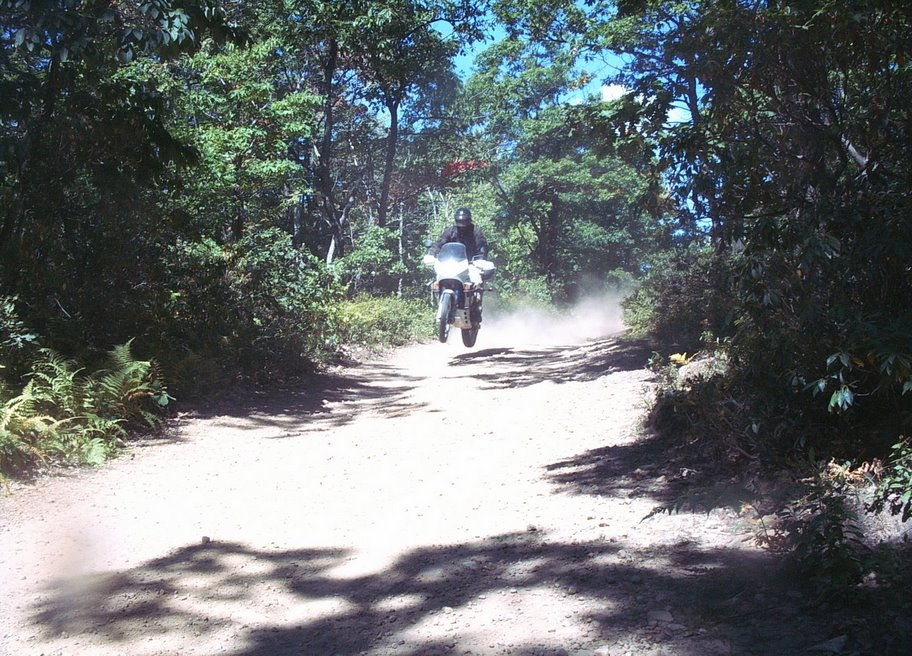
Transalp being used off-road

The weight of the Transalp increased over time, from 175 kg (386 lb) for the first models to 218 kg (481 lb) for the latest version.

In 2000, the XL650V Transalp replaced the XL600V, introducing the engine from the Deauville and Honda Revere. The power output increased to 39 kW (52 hp) at 7,500 rpm, torque increased to 54 N⋅m (40 lbf⋅ft) at 5,500 rpm. A 4 mm bore diameter increase gave a 64 cc displacement increase. The shock absorbers were redesigned for road use, the exhaust system was updated, the fuel capacity increased by one litre, the control panel was redesigned, and weight diminished by 4 kg (8.8 lb).

In 2007, the XL700V Transalp was introduced, with a new 680 cc engine, which was also fitted to the NT700V Deauville, and compatible with Euro 3 emission standards. The front wheel diameter was reduced from 21 inches to 19 inches, the exhaust system was fitted with a catalytic converter, the lights were redesigned, and ABS was introduced.

The 2008 model reinforces the road orientation of the Transalp, with larger tyres, lower saddle and more road-oriented shock absorbers. The 2008 XL700V engine is a liquid-cooled, eight-valve, four-stroke, single-overhead cam, 52° V-twin.

The 2023, after ten years, the Transalp's name reborn on all new model Honda XL750 Transalp with new engine is a 755 cc, Unicam 8-valve parallel twin that produced 67.5 kW (91 hp; 92 PS) and is shared with the CB750 Hornet.
