= Honda NT650 =

Motorcycle

Honda Hawk GT
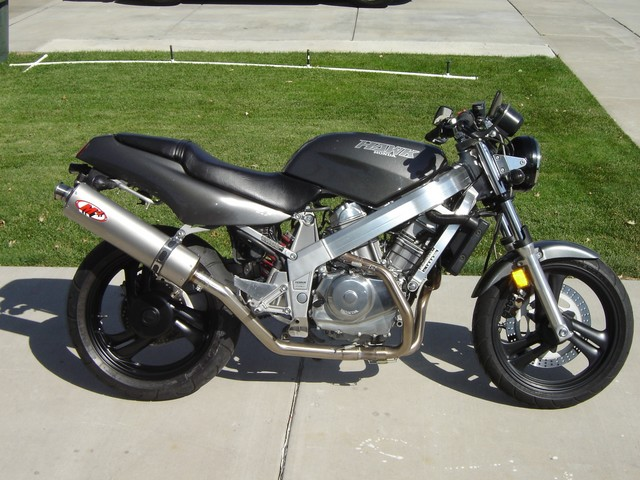
- 1988 Honda Hawk GT
- Manufacturer: Honda
- Also called: NT650, Bros, RC31
- Production: 1988–1992
- Class: Naked bike
- Engine: 647 cc (39.5 cu in), four-stroke, 52° V-twin
- Bore / stroke: 79.0 mm x 66.0 mm
- Compression ratio: 9.4:1
- Top speed: 180 km/h (110 mph)
- Power: 43 kW (58 hp) (claimed); 28.0 kW (37.5 hp) (rear wheel)
- Torque: 42 N⋅m (31 lb⋅ft) (rear wheel)
- Transmission: 5-speed, manual, chain
- Suspension: F: Showa 41mm non-adjustable fork, 140 mm (5.5 in) wheel travel R: Showa shock with adjustable preload, 120 mm (4.7 in) wheel travel
- Brakes: F: Dual-piston, 316 mm (12.4 in) disc R: Single-piston, 240 mm (9.4 in) disc
- Tires: F: 110/80–17; R: 150/70–17
- Rake, trail: 28.0º, 119 mm (4.7 in)
- Wheelbase: 1,430 mm (56.3 in)
- Seat height: 30.6 in (780 mm)
- Weight: 181.0 kg (399.1 lb) (claimed) (dry); 187 kg (412 lb) (wet)
- Fuel capacity: 12 L (2.6 imp gal; 3.2 US gal)
- Oil capacity: 2.8 L (3.0 US qt)

The Honda Hawk GT (NT650) motorcycle was designated as model RC31 and was designed by Toshiaki Kishi, and was the second Honda bike with "Pro-Arm" suspension after the RC30 VFR750R. The 1970s/1980s Honda CB400T was also called the Hawk.

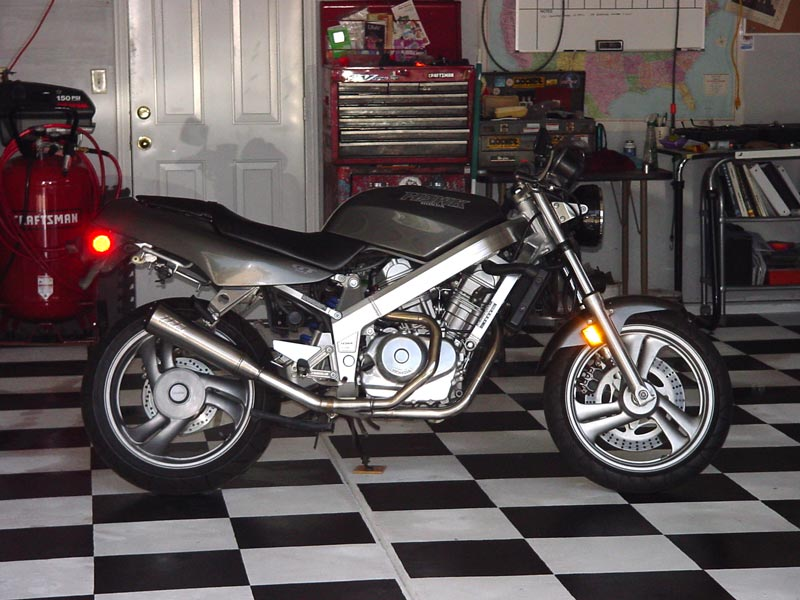
650 cc Honda Hawk GT

The Hawk GT was amongst one of the first wave of modern V-twin naked bikes, with its release coinciding with the smaller VT250 Spada and coming before the release of the retro-inspired NC33 VRX400. Debuting several years before the Ducati Monster, Suzuki VX800 and SV650, the Hawk GT is often described as an influential cult bike.

== North American model ==
The US model NT650, Hawk GT 647, RC31 was introduced in 1988 and produced through 1991. It has an aluminium box frame with the separate rear frame bolted on, and a chain-drive, single-sided swingarm.

Priced above other entry-level models and only slightly below many 600 cc sport bikes, the Hawk GT did not sell well in American markets.

There are only very minor changes between the 1988 model year and the 1989-1991 model years. In 1989, the front suspension damper rods were changed to have only two (rather than four for the 1988) holes. The front brake calipers were also changed to have screw-on covers over the mounting pins. In 1991, the oil lines were run internally through the engine, rather than externally. The Canadian model was identical to the US model except for the colors. In the US, the 1988 model was offered in Tempest Gray and Tanzanite Blue. In subsequent years, Bright Red only was offered in the US.

The 1988 model had a wet weight of 187 kg (412 lb). The 650 cc engine had a claimed output of 43 kW (58 hp) @ 5000 rpm.

== European model ==
A cousin to the Hawk GT, the NTV 600 "Revere" was available in Europe from 1988 to 1992. It had an integrated steel frame, larger fuel tank (19 litres or 4.2 imperial gallons), a lower and stubbier silencer, shaft drive, single-sided alloy swinging arm at rear with adjustable monoshock and a centre stand. It was launched as a "gentleman's" motorcycle but was seen as expensive for what was on offer.

The 600 Revere was replaced in 1993 by the bored-out NTV650 (the Revere name being dropped in the UK), with a cheaper specification (including tubular handlebars instead of alloy bars, cheaper instruments and horns, some supplied without a centre stand), and continued with the "stubby" silencer until 1995 and later models got a full-length silencer to comply with updated noise regulations. The price was reduced compared to the Revere, and this later model sold better.

The NTV650 was replaced in 1998 by the Spanish built NT650V Deauville, a much heavier fully-faired model with integral small panniers and a steel double-sided swinging arm.

== Japan model ==
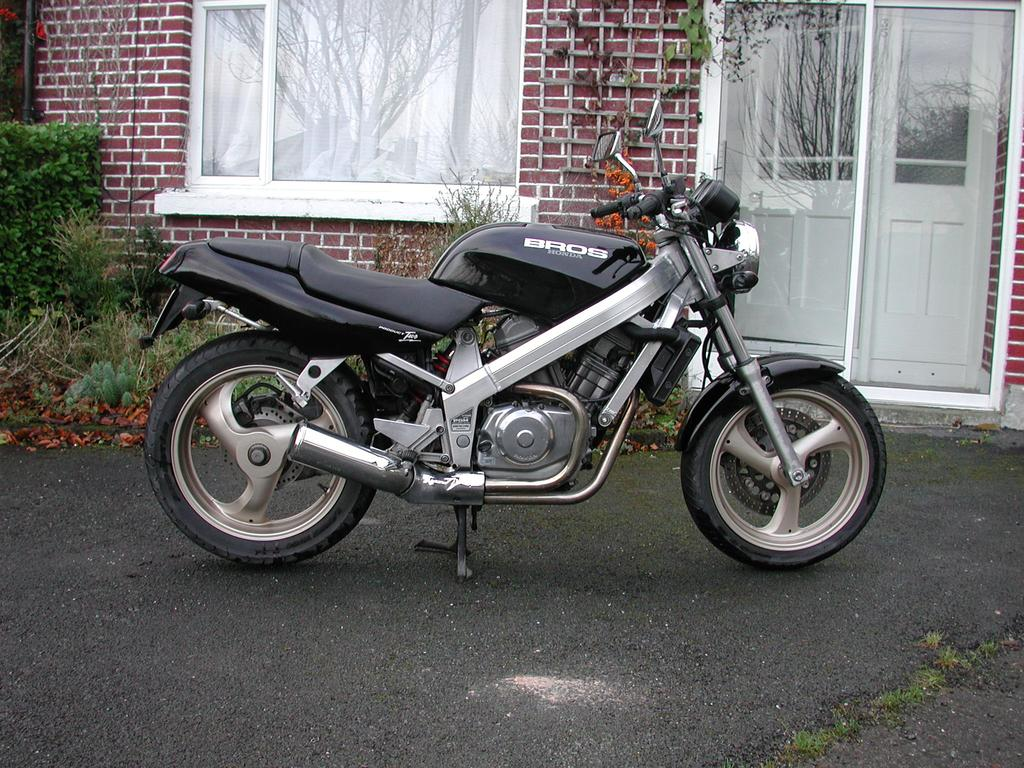
400 cc Honda Bros

Named the Bros in Japan, because the two different engine displacement versions conceived together as "brothers", the Bros came in 400 and 650 cc (24 and 40 cu in) versions, with the Bros 400 being designated NC25. After Honda stopped exporting the Hawk in 1992, they continued the Bros in Japan for one more year. A close ratio gear box (which drops into the Hawk), different wheels, and lower clip-ons were the major changes. A Motor Cycle News review said the Bros 400 is "heavy, underpowered and outdated, ... but surprisingly nice to ride – they’re well balanced, steer well and the engine is flexible, torquey and characterful given its 33bhp output. The Bros version is chain driven instead of using a shaft drive, lightening the unspring weight of the bike considerably. The Bros has a comfy, semi-upright café racer riding position."
