= Honda Africa Twin =

Dual-sport motorcycle

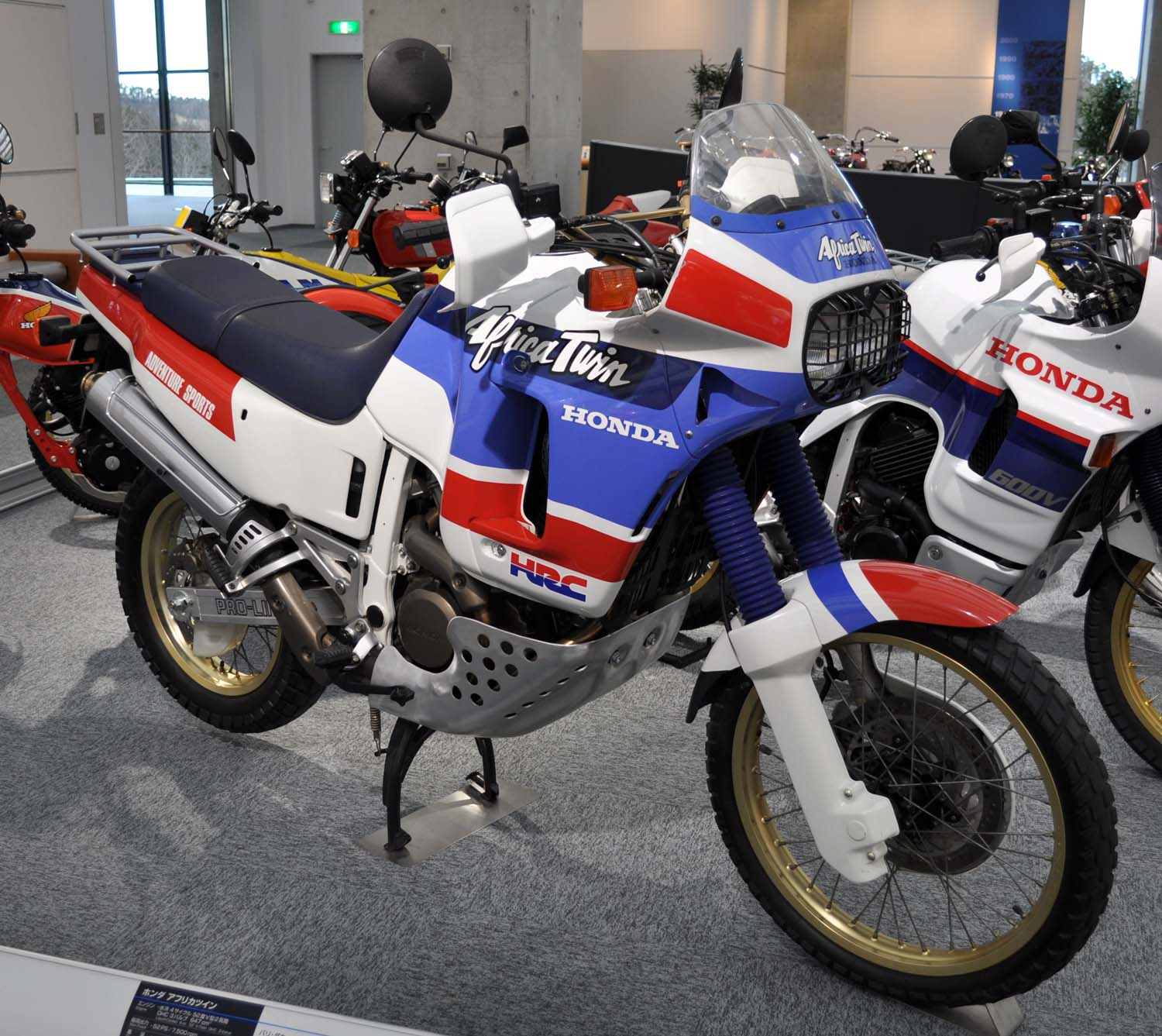
1988 XRV650 Africa Twin

The Honda Africa Twin is a dual-sport motorcycle produced by Honda. The motorcycle was built in several models. Between 1988 and 1989, the vehicle was produced as the XRV650, between 1990 and 2000 it was the XRV750T, between 2016 and 2019 as the CRF1000L, between 2020 and 2026 as the CRF1100L, and since 2027 as the CRF1150L.

== XRV750 ==
The Africa Twin, also known as the Honda XRV750, is a 742 cc dual-sport motorcycle manufactured by Honda. The motorcycle was based on the NXR-750, which won the Paris-Dakar rally four times in the late eighties.

It was preceded by the eponymous XRV650 Africa Twin, a lighter, higher specification version made in 1988 and 1989 by Honda Racing Corporation, featuring a 650 cc engine producing 42 kW (56 hp). It was propelled by a chain transmission.

== CRF1000L/CRF1100L/CRF1150L ==
The Honda CRF1000L is a 1000 cc dual-sport motorcycle manufactured by Honda. It became available in the UK in late 2015 and early 2016 in the US, reviving their Africa Twin line. The motorcycle is developed as a modern interpretation of its predecessors, the XRV 750 and XRV 650, based on the NXR-750, which won the Paris-Dakar rally four times in the late 1980s. The original V-twin Africa Twin was first sold in Europe from 1988 to the final production year of 2003 but was never brought to the United States. The CRF1000L is also seen as a response by Honda to the heavier, on-road-focused adventure touring motorcycles such as the BMW R1200GS, Ducati Multistrada, and Triumph Tiger Explorer, offering a lighter, more off-road-focused machine.
