= Yamaha DT =

Yamaha DT-1
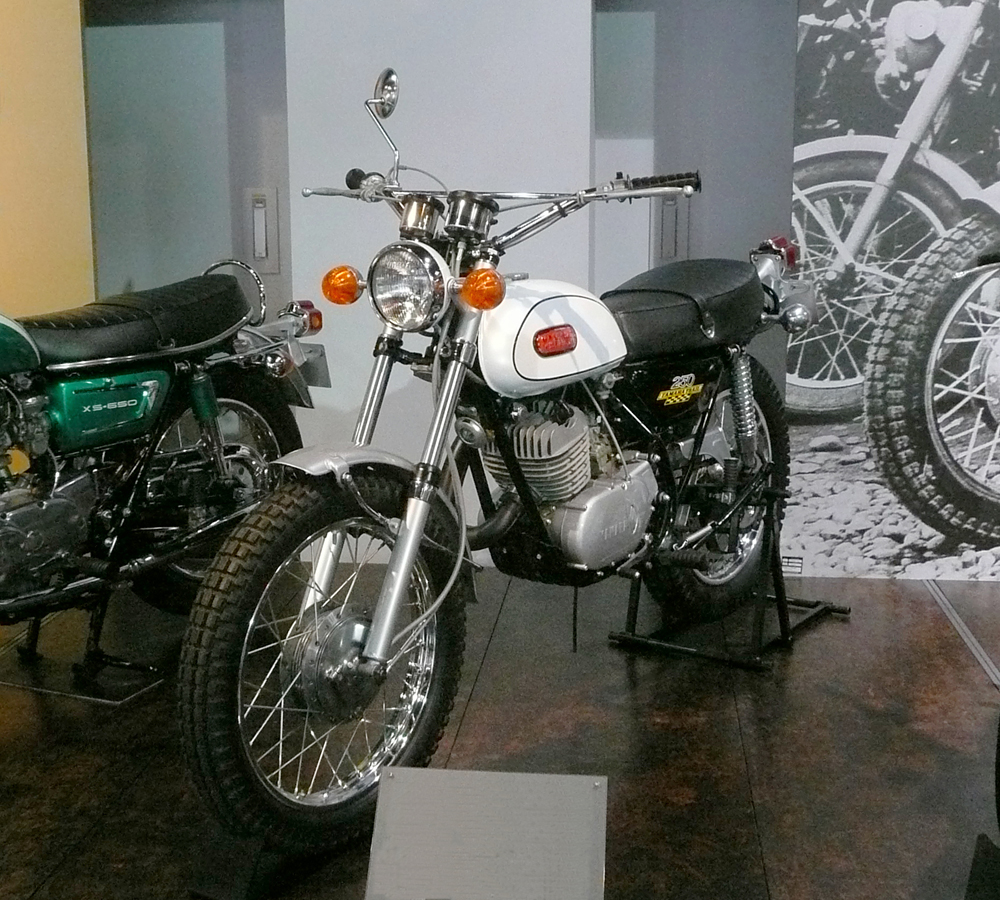
- 1968 Yamaha DT-1 in Yamaha Communication Plaza.
- Manufacturer: Yamaha Motor Company
- Also called: Yamaha Trail 250
- Parent company: Yamaha Corporation
- Production: 1968—1985
- Assembly: Iwata, Shizuoka, Japan
- Successor: Yamaha DT250, DT360A, DT400B
- Class: Trail bike
- Engine: 246 cm^{3} (15.0 cu in) 2-stroke, single-cylinder, air-cooled
- Bore / stroke: 70 mm × 64 mm (2.8 in × 2.5 in)
- Power: 18.5 PS (13.6 kW; 18.2 hp) at 6000 rpm
- Ignition type: Magnet ignition
- Transmission: Manual 5-speed
- Frame type: Duplex cradle
- Suspension: F: Telescopic, R: Swing arm
- Brakes: F: Cable-operated drum R: Rod-operated drum
- Tires: F: 3.25-19, R: 4.00-18
- Wheelbase: 1,360 mm (54 in)
- Dimensions: L: 2,060 mm (81 in); W: 890 mm (35 in); H: 1,130 mm (44 in)
- Weight: 123 kg (271 lb) (dry)
- Fuel capacity: 9.5 L (2.1 imp gal; 2.5 US gal)
- Fuel consumption: 40 km/L (110 mpg_{‑imp}; 94 mpg_{‑US}) at 40 km/h (25 mph)

The Yamaha DT is a series of motorcycles and mopeds produced by the Yamaha Motor Corporation. Models in the DT series feature an engine displacement of 50 to 400 cc (3.1 to 24.4 cu in). The first DT model, the DT-1, was released in 1968 and quickly sold through its initial 12,000 production run.

The DT series was created by Yamaha in the late 1960s when the United States motorcycle market was down. Market research by Yamaha indicated that, despite slow motorcycle sales, there was a largely untapped market for off-road motorcycles. At the time, only a few specialty European manufacturers such as Bultaco and Husqvarna made motorcycles specifically for off-road use. Instead, many owners purchased road motorcycles and modified them for off-road use, typically by raising the muffler, adding braced handlebars, and fitting a bash plate under the engine . Such modifications were commonly known as creating scramblers. The first DT model, the DT-1 trail bike, was released in 1968 and quickly sold out.

== DT-1 ==
With the introduction of the DT-1, Yamaha essentially defined a new market for motorcycles. A Dual-sport motorcycle built for off-road riding, the light and slim DT-1 was equipped with block-pattern tires and had sufficient ground clearance. Its design put it at the cutting edge of off-road bikes at that time. It had a 250 cc, single-cylinder, 5-port engine based on a motocross design, and Ceriani-type front suspension.

The Society of Automotive Engineers of Japan (in Japanese), included the 1968 Yamaha Trail 250 (aka DT-1) as one of their 240 Landmarks of Japanese Automotive Technology.

A monoshock rear suspension system was introduced starting in 1977 giving rise to the "MX" suffix on model numbers.

Models in the DT series

- DT-1
- DT50LC
- DT50M
- DT50MX
- DT50R
- DT50X
- DT80MX
- DT80LC
- DT80R
- DT100MX
- DT100R
- DT100E
- DT125
- DT125LC
- DT125MX
- DT125R
- DT125X
- DT125RE
- DT175
- DT175MX
- DT175
- DT180
- DT200
- DT200R
- DT230 Lanza
- DT250
- DT250MX
- DT250R
- DT350LC
- DT350R
- DT360
- DT400B
- DT400MX

Gallery

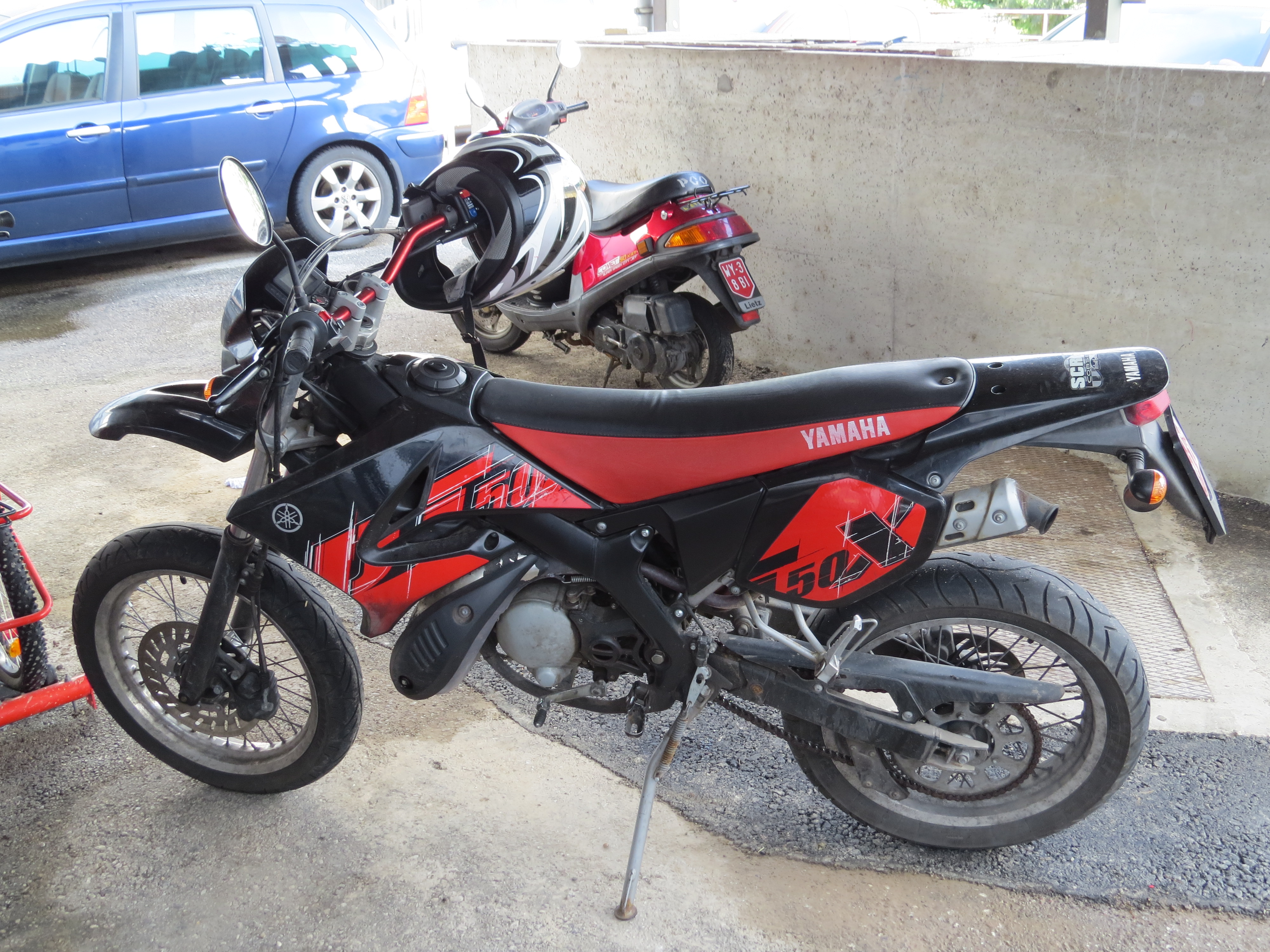
Yamaha DT50X

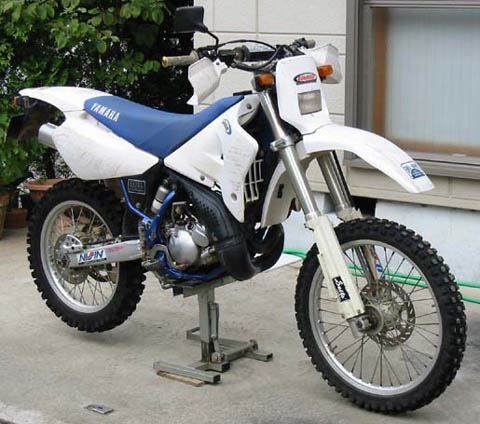
Yamaha DT200
