= Yamaha DT250 =

Yamaha Enduro Motorcycle

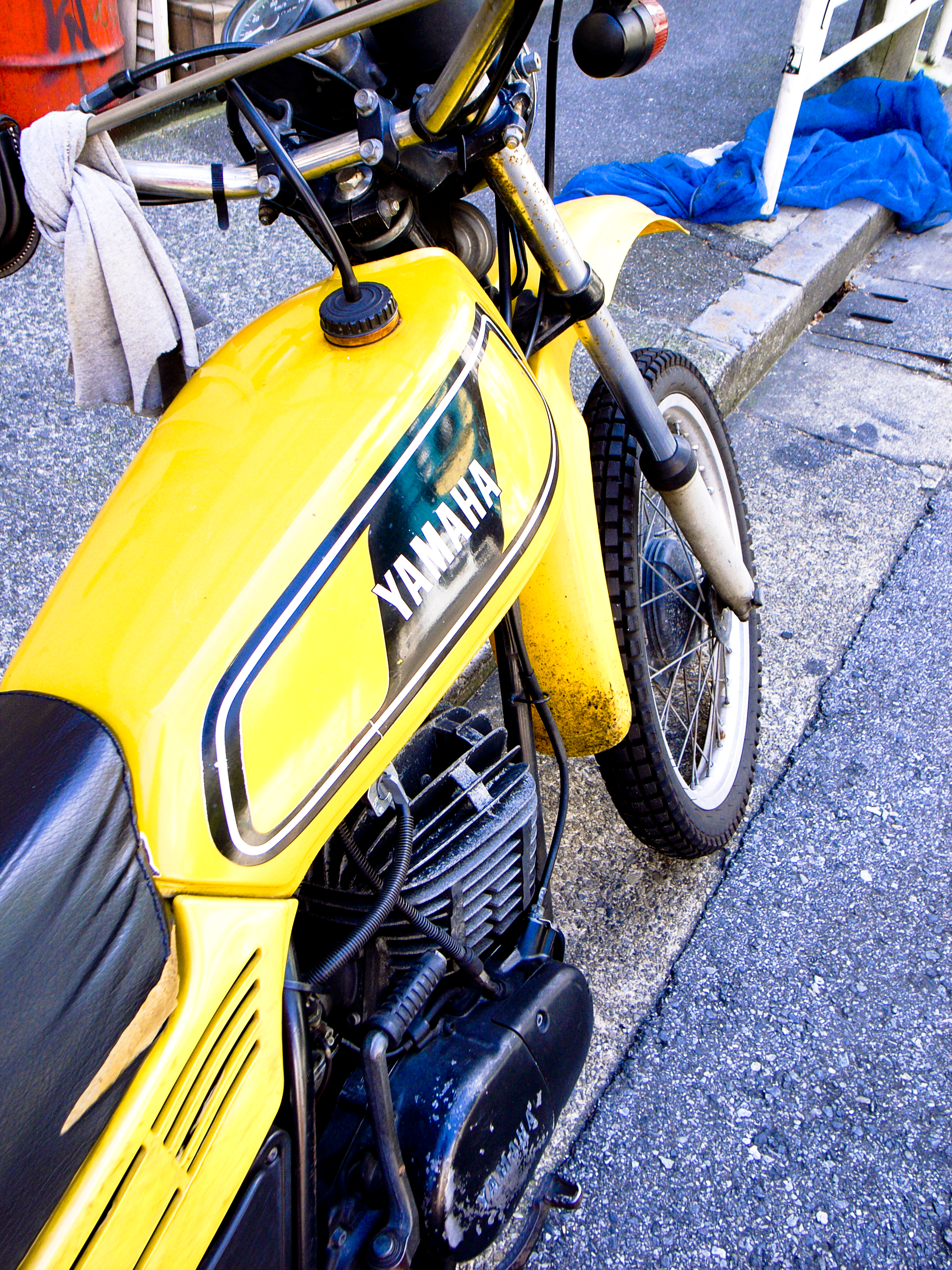
- Yamaha DT250
- Manufacturer: Yamaha Motor Company
- Production: 1971-1982
- Predecessor: DT-1
- Class: Enduro
- Engine: 246 cc (15.0 cu in), air-cooled, Two-stroke engine, single
- Transmission: 5-speed
- Frame type: Cradle frame using a double loop
- Brakes: Drum
- Tires: Front 3.00 x 21 4PR Rear 4.00-18
- Related: Yamaha DT

Yamaha DT250 is an enduro or a Dual-sport motorcycle with a Two-stroke engine. The motorcycle was introduced by the Yamaha Motor Company in 1971 and was produced until 1982.

== Specifications ==
The motorcycle was made for both on-road and off-road. In 1976 Yamaha motorcycle advertisement claimed the bike had torque induction intake, thermal phase shock absorbers and built in oil coolers. The bike also used the monoshock rear suspension which had been successful on Motocross machines. In 1976 the motorcycle was offered for $798.

The motorcycle was outfitted with a 250cc air-cooled two-stroke, single cylinder engine which was ready to use on dirt roads. The bike had several off-road features including: an aluminum skid plate under the crankcase, Serrated Footpegs, turn signals with supported by rubber mounts.

== History ==
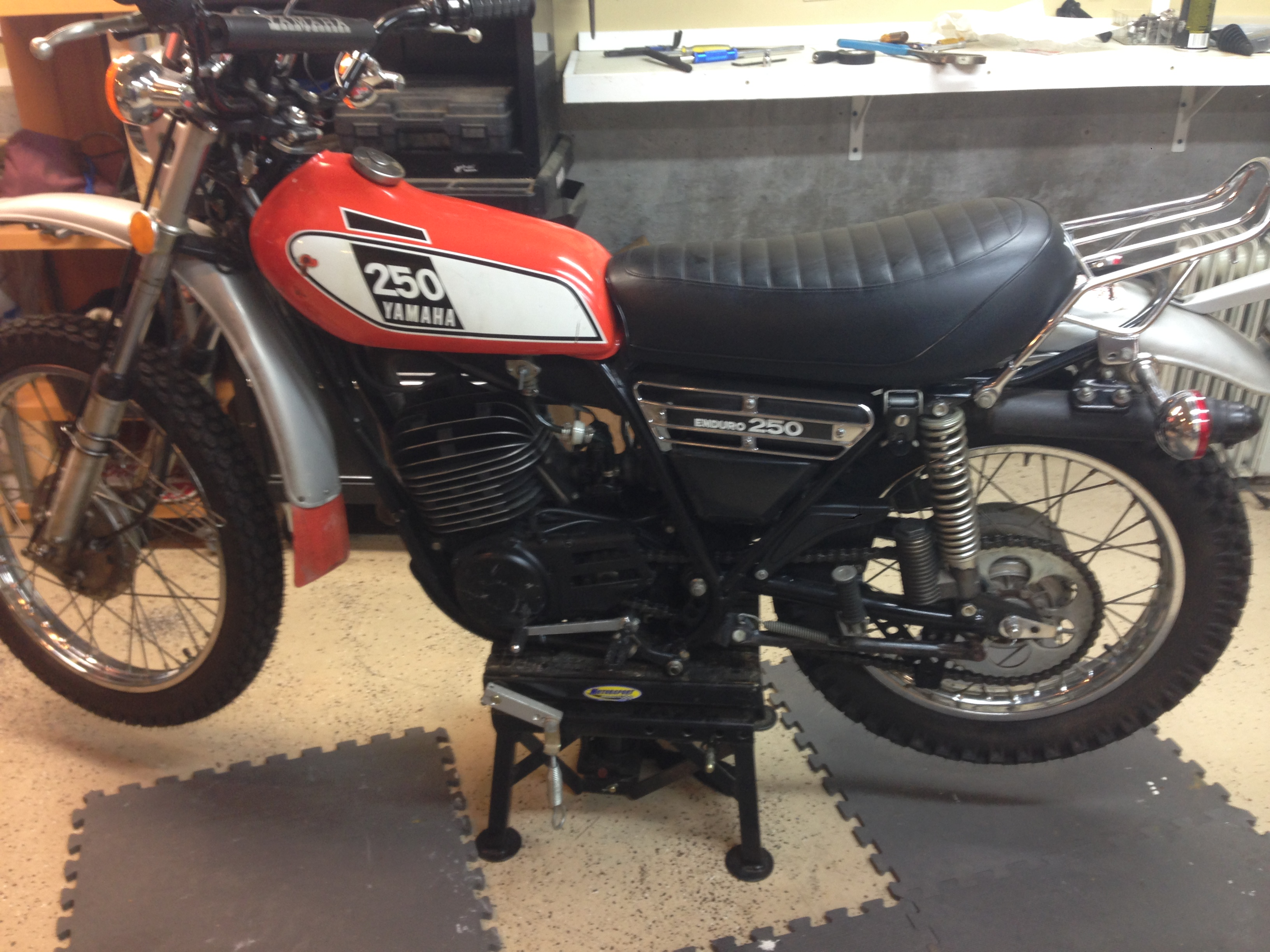
A mid-'70s Yamaha DT250

The Yamaha DT250 was preceded by the 1968 DT-1. The DT250 began production in 1971 and was produced through 1982. Other models produced in the DT250 group were the DT250F and DT250MX. The DT250 was released three years earlier than the Yamaha DT125. The DT250 was one of the leading dual-sport machines in the 1970s.
