= V85 =

V85 may refer to:

- Moto Guzzi V85 TT, an Italian motorcycle
- V85 speed, in vehicle traffic law
- Vought V-85, an American observation biplane
