= Honda MB/T/X series =

Motorcycle sold in Spain, Belgium and Sweden

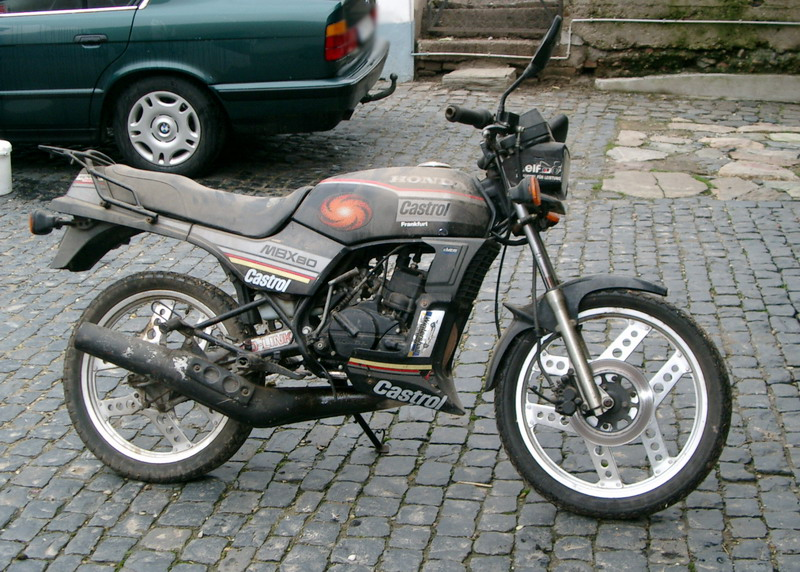
Honda MBX 80

In 1979, Honda introduced a series of light motorcycles in the US and in Europe. Honda's production lines of these models were in Spain, Belgium and Sweden.

== History ==
Both the Honda MB road-model and the Honda MT offroad-model motorcycles were released in Europe and South Africa. The MB was made from 1979 to 1987 in Europe and in the U.S. up until 1982. In Europe however the MT50 production would last until 1997.

Both models came in 4 versions; 80cc unrestricted (F), 80cc restricted (S), 50 cc unrestricted (F) and 50cc restricted (S), two-stroke. Honda left its four-stroke program temporarily because it was aimed at the European and South African moped markets for 16-year-olds, the legal age at which someone could ride a 50 cc motorcycle in South Africa and most European countries.

The MB model was standard equipped with a speedometer, rpm counter, front disc brake, two stroke oil injection system and Honda Comstar wheels. Because of its success Honda released the MT series, a naked off-road version, on the European and South African markets.

The result of this move was that sales in Europe and South Africa greatly increased. The MT series earned its popularity because of the large numbers of original and imitation parts that were available, the fact engine parts from the restricted models could easily be replaced with those from an unrestricted model and its off-road ability due to high ground clearance.

In parallel with the MB and MT series, Honda released air-cooled MBX, MCX50/80 and MTX 50/80 cc models. Unlike the MT50 which had a 4 or 5 speed gearbox depending on the exact model and country code, the MTX50 had a 5 or 6 speed gearbox and in some cases a HERP chamber on the exhaust, again all depending on the exact model and country code. In 1983, Honda released a water-cooled successor to both the MB/MT and air-cooled MBX/MTX series, the MTX50R/80R and the MBX50S/F and 80S/F. During the entire production years from 1983 onwards of the MTX and MBX only small improvements and cosmetic changes were made. After the 1983 MTX80R received bad reviews in the German press the 1984 MTX80R received upgraded suspension, and changes were made to all watercooled 80cc engines of the MBX and MTX to solve crankshaft bearing issues. Unfortunately the problem of loose fitment of the crankshaft bearings in the engine cases was never resolved until the upgrade to 25mm crank bearings, although the left side crankcase remained a weak point.

The last 80cc MTX model was the MTX80R2H, a motorcycle based around the existing MTX125/200R motorcycles.

Because of important law and insurance changes combined with constantly rising sales prices and miscalculations in predicting future sales made by Honda Europe the sales in these two stroke mopeds and light motorcycles decreased enormously after 1987. As a result, production in Spain and Belgium came to a standstill in 1992. MBX production lasted another year and stopped in 1993. Only in Scandinavia a limited production of the Honda MT50s for the local market lasted until 1999. After that Honda's M models where discontinued.

There were 50, 75, 80, and 125 variants of both the MBX and MTX as well as a 200c version of the MTX. The MTX125/200R started life in 1983 and were upgraded in 1985. Changes includes dropping the drum brake at the front and replacing with a disc, bigger forks, revised graphics, a revised rear shock, revised CDI and, in the case of the 200, a new swingarm. The 125 cc motorcycle came in both restricted and unrestricted form. The unrestricted version and the 200 cc version had ATAC chambers operated by a piston valve attached to a mechanical governor.

The aircooled 80cc engines used a two-ring 45mm piston and 50.8mm stroke – compared to the 39mm and 49.5mm piston and 41.4mm stroke of the aircooled 50cc and watercooled 80cc models

For some countries, the MBX was made with a partly redesigned 75cc engine to meet with local regulations. The same redesigned engine was also used in the MTX80R2 and part of the redesign was also used in the late 50cc engines for NS-1/NSR50R. The redesign was based on changes made on the Japanese NRS80 from 1992 onwards and consisted mainly of a crankshaft with an o-ring cut on the transmission side, larger piston pin (13mm instead of 12), conrod 18mm inner diameter instead of 17mm, 25mm crankshaft bearings, a DC ignition system.

After several years the MBX50/80 was replaced by the NSR50/75 which in turn was replaced by the NS-1 50/75, sometimes also called NSR50R (not to be confused with the 2004 HRC nsr50R race bike) and NSR75R. The MTX50R/80R/80R2 where replaced by the CRM50R and 75R.
