= Yamaha DT400B =

Yamaha Enduro Motorcycle

Yamaha DT400
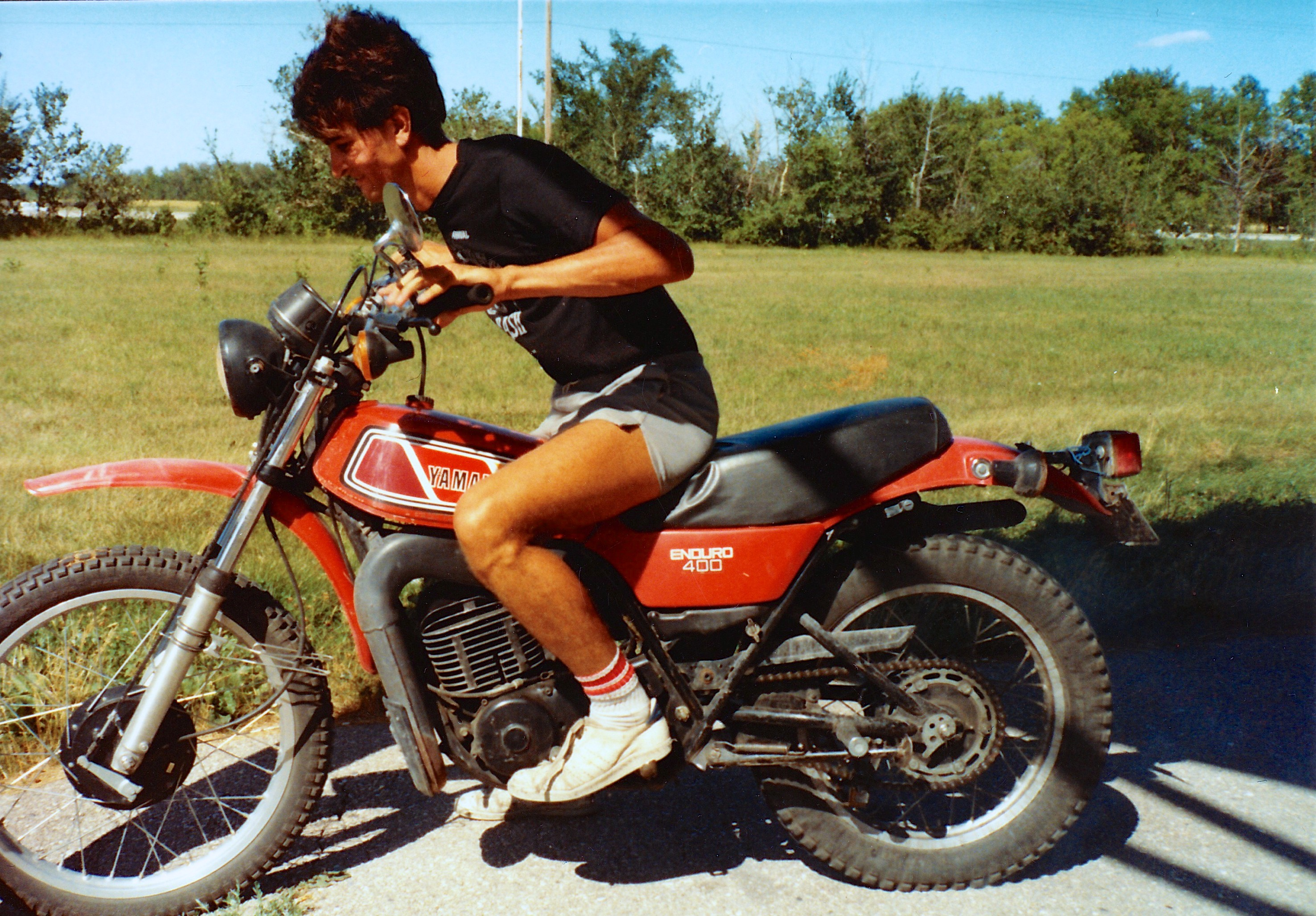
- Red 1978 DT 400
- Manufacturer: Yamaha Motor Company
- Production: 1975-1979
- Predecessor: DT360A
- Class: Enduro
- Engine: 397 cc (24.2 cu in), air-cooled, Two-stroke engine, single
- Transmission: 5-speed
- Frame type: Cradle frame using a double loop
- Brakes: Drum
- Tires: Front 3.00-21 Rear 4.00-18
- Related: Yamaha DT

Yamaha DT400B is an enduro or Dual-sport motorcycle 2 stroke motorcycle which was introduced by the Yamaha Motor Company in 1975 and was produced until 1979.

== Specifications ==
The DT400B utilized a 2 stroke air cooled 397CC engine which put out 23hp. The engine used a kick start. It was chain driven with drum brakes. The motorcycle had lights and turn signals, and it was made to operate off-road and on road. It weighed 289 pounds. When introduced in 1975 it had a list price of $1371 US dollars.

== History ==
Yamaha produced the enduro DT1 250 in 1968. The motorcycle was embraced and Yamaha learned that, in America riders were interested in motorcycles which could operate off-road, and on road. Yamaha experimented with larger displacement and in 1975 they created the DT400B. The DT400B did not initially sell well, and Yamaha reduced the price. The 2 stroke engine was not ideal and by 1979 the DT400B was discontinued.
