= Moto Guzzi Stelvio =

- Moto Guzzi Stelvio 1200
- Manufacturer: Moto Guzzi
- Production: 2007–2016
- Predecessor: Quota
- Successor: V85 TT (2019); Stelvio (2024)
- Class: Dual-sport
- Engine: 1,151 cc (70.2 cu in) Air/oil cooled, 8-valve V-twin
- Bore / stroke: 95.0 mm × 81.2 mm (3.74 in × 3.20 in)
- Top speed: 220 km/h (140 mph)
- Power: 77 kW (103 hp) @ 7250 RPM
- Torque: 113 N⋅m (83 lb⋅ft) @ 5800 RPM
- Transmission: 6-speed Shaft drive
- Brakes: Front: Twin disc brakes with four-piston 320 mm calipers Rear: Disc brake with twin piston 282 calipers
- Wheelbase: 1,535 mm (60.4 in)
- Dimensions: L: 2,305 mm (90.7 in); W: 956 mm (37.6 in); H: 1,436–1,492 mm (56.5–58.7 in)
- Seat height: 82–84 cm (32–33 in)
- Weight: 251 kilograms (553 lb) (dry)
- Fuel capacity: 32 L (7.0 imp gal; 8.5 US gal)

The Moto Guzzi Stelvio 1200 is a dual-sport motorcycle manufactured by the Italian company Moto Guzzi from 2007 to 2016.

== History ==
The Stelvio model was introduced in November 2007 at the Milan motorcycle show EICMA for the 2008 model year. It is named after the alpine Stelvio Pass.

The 2009 model featured changes in engine tuning. For 2012, the fairing was restyled; electronic dash updated; and fuel capacity was increased.

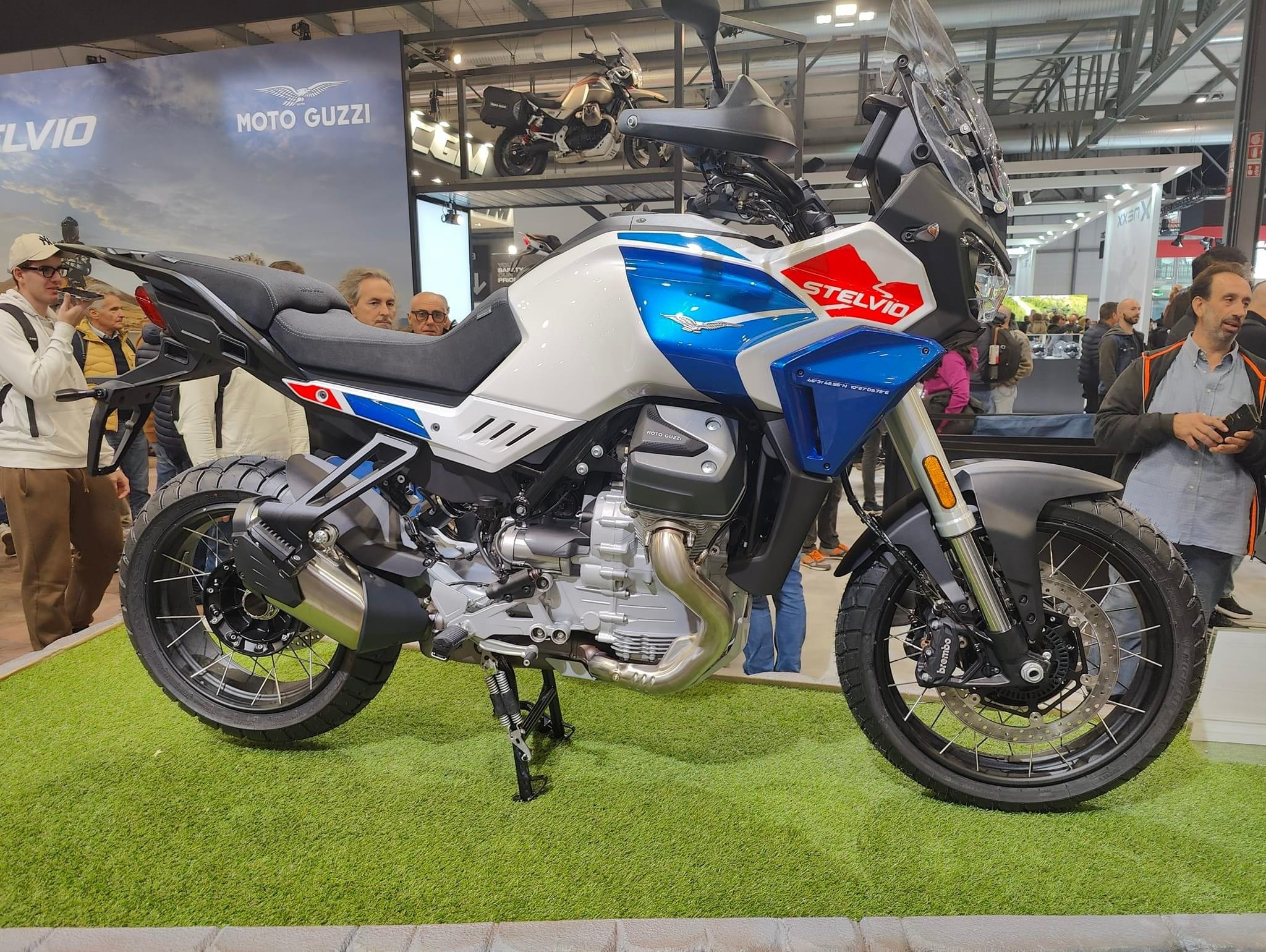
2024 Moto Guzzi Stelvio

In 2024, a new Stelvio model was introduced, featuring an engine delivering a maximum output of 115 hp at 8,700 rpm and peak torque of 105 Nm at 6,750 rpm. The chassis adopts a high-strength steel tubular frame, combined with tubeless wire-spoke wheels measuring 19” at the front and 17” at the rear, paired with long-travel suspension. Stelvio is the first Moto Guzzi equipped with the PFF Rider Assistance Solution, a rider-assistance platform that provides functions playing a key role in active safety, based on radar technology developed by Piaggio Fast Forward, the Piaggio Group’s robotics-focused company headquartered in Boston and founded in 2015.

== Specifications ==
The so-called Quattrovalvole (four-valve) engine comes from the Griso/Breva series and has been optimized with modified camshafts for an improved torque curve.

=== Engine ===
The motor is an air/oil-cooled, transversally mounted 90° V-twin, four-stroke engine that displaces 1,151 cc (70.2 cu in) and generates rated output of 79.4 kW (106.5 hp) at 7,500 rpm. The maximum torque of 113 N⋅m (83 lbf⋅ft) is developed at 5,800 rpm. The two cylinders have a bore of 95 mm (3.74 inches), the piston has a stroke of 81.2 mm (3.20 inches) and a compression ratio of 11:1. Each cylinder head has an overhead chain driven camshaft that actuates the two intake and two exhaust valves.

The 2-into-1 exhaust system made of stainless steel and has a three-way catalytic converter with two oxygen sensors; the emissions are well below the Euro 3 standard. The fuel tank on both the base model and the NTX variant holds 32 litres (7.0 imp gal; 8.5 US gal), of which 7 litres (1.5 imp gal; 1.8 US gal) is reserve. The manufacturer recommends the use of unleaded gasoline with a Research Octane Number of at least 95, 90 R+M/2 in North America.

=== Suspension ===
The chassis consists of a tubular steel frame with load-bearing engine. A hydraulic 50 mm diameter upside-down fork by Marzocchi with 170 mm (6.7 inches) of travel guides the front. The rear wheel is held by a single-sided swingarm with progressive linkage, which is damped by a Sachs-Boge monoshock with a progressively-acting lever system and 155 mm of travel. Power is transferred to the rear wheel via a shaft integrated into the single-sided swingarm with two joints and an anti-torque reaction support.

=== Brakes ===
The front wheel mounts dual disc brakes with cross-drilled, semi-floating 320 mm steel discs and radial-mounted four-piston calipers. At the rear wheel, a cross-drilled 282 mm disc with a dual-piston caliper is mounted. The brake lines are steel reinforced. The brake system on the latest models has standard anti-lock brakes and a switchable traction control system.

=== NTX differences ===
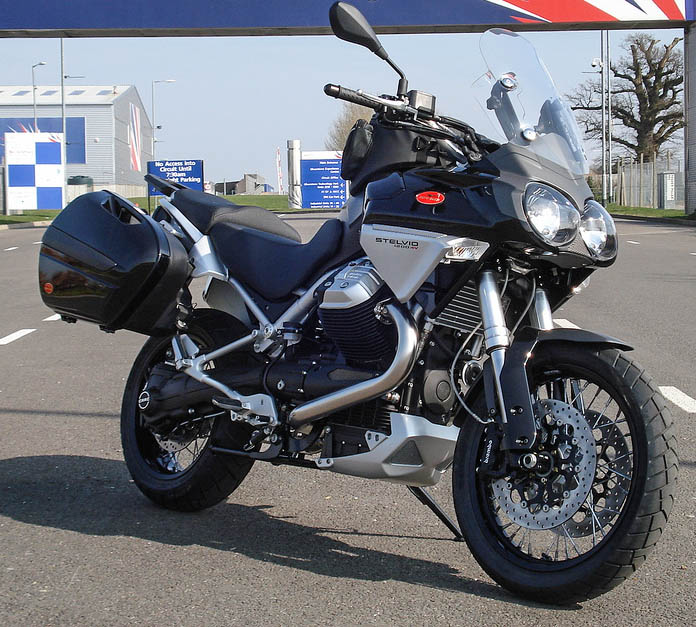
Moto Guzzi Stelvio Travel Accessories

The NTX model has factory offroad accessories not found on the base model: hand guards, oil sump guard, aluminum panniers, (not including a topbox), a larger windscreen and wire spoke wheels.

== Critical reaction ==
Reviewers pegged the Stelvio as a competent competitor for other adventure-touring bikes like the BMW R1200GS and Yamaha Super Ténéré, although heavy. They noted in particular the ability of the NTX, with its high capacity fuel tank, to take riders to offroad destinations where refueling is not available.
