= Moto Guzzi Stelvio (2024) =

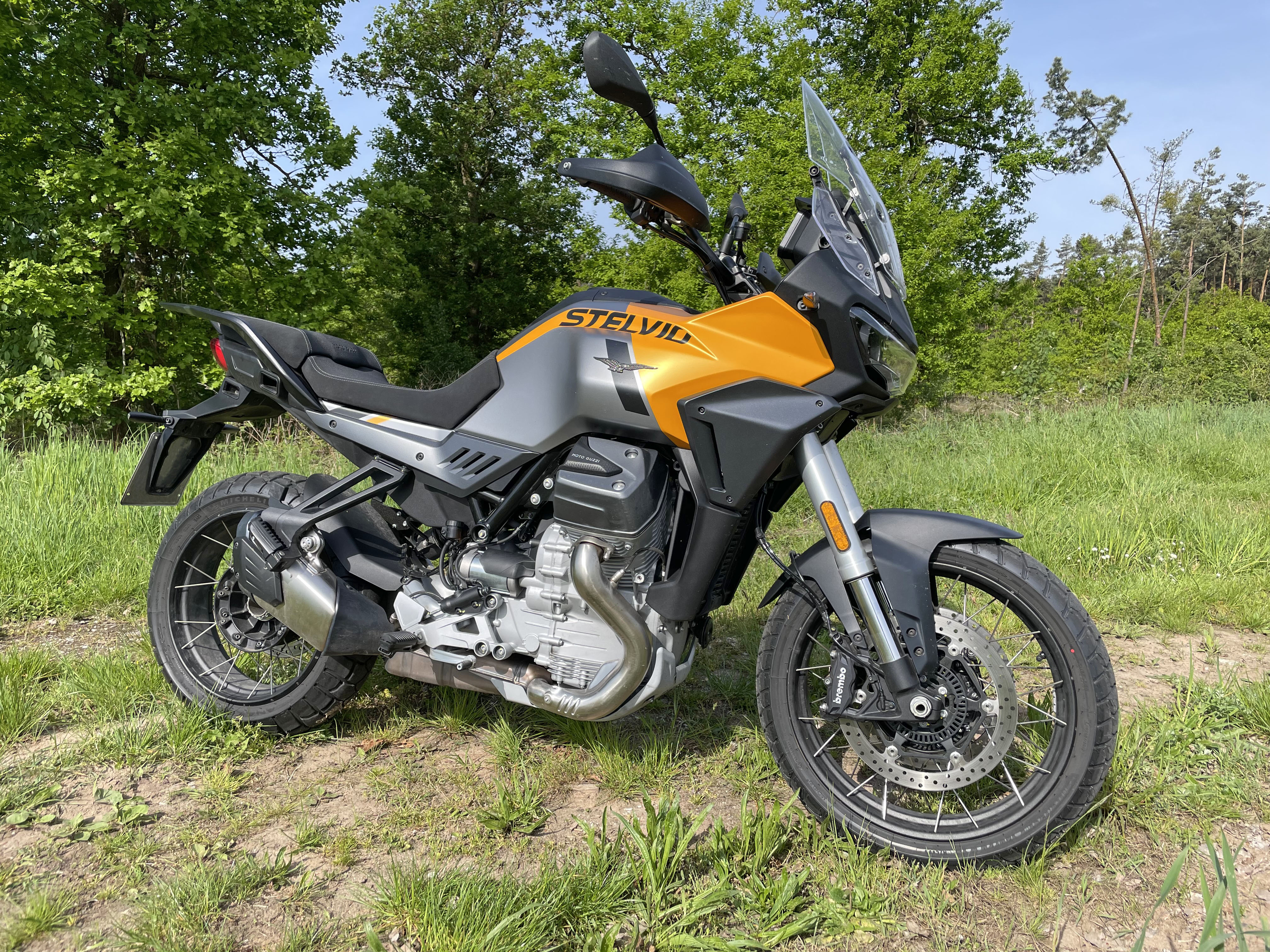
- 2024 Stelvio
- Manufacturer: Moto Guzzi
- Production: 2024–present
- Predecessor: Stelvio (2008)
- Class: Dual-sport
- Engine: 1,042 cc (63.6 cu in) Liquid cooled, 8-valve V-twin
- Bore / stroke: 96.0 mm × 72.0 mm (3.78 in × 2.83 in)
- Top speed: 220 km/h (140 mph)
- Power: 85 kW (114 hp) @ 8700 RPM
- Torque: 105 N⋅m (77 lb⋅ft) @ 6750 RPM
- Transmission: 6-speed Shaft drive
- Brakes: Front: Twin disc brakes with four-piston 320 mm calipers Rear: Disc brake with twin piston 280 calipers
- Wheelbase: 1,520 mm (60 in)
- Seat height: 83 cm (33 in)
- Weight: 246 kilograms (542 lb) (wet)
- Fuel capacity: 21 L (4.6 imp gal; 5.5 US gal)

The Moto Guzzi Stelvio is an adventure touring motorcycle that the Italian manufacturer Moto Guzzi has been producing in Mandello del Lario since the end of 2023. Like its predecessor which was produced from 2008 to 2016, it is named after the alpine Stelvio Pass (Passo dello Stelvio in Italian).

== History ==
The new version of the Stelvio was announced in November 2022 at the 79th international motorbike show EICMA in Milan and made available to selected journalists for test rides at the end of October 2023. It was subsequently exhibited at the 80th EICMA in November 2023.

At launch, the model was available in two colour combinations: "Giallo Savana" (silver and dark yellow) and "Nero Vulcano" (black and silver). Deliveries started in early 2024.

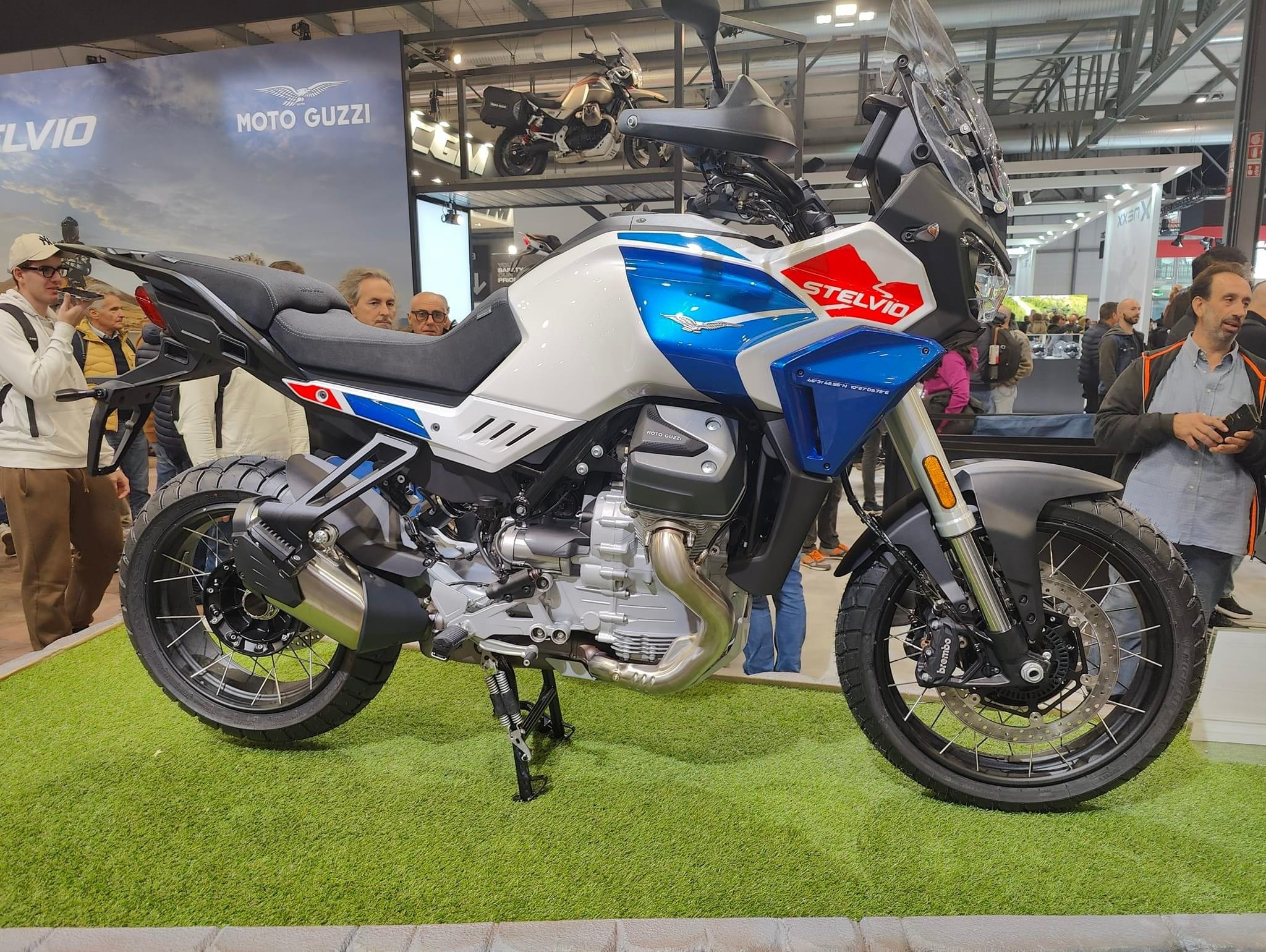
2025 Stelvio Duecento Tributo (limited edition)

In 2025, the limited edition Stelvio Duecento Tributo ("200 Tribute" in English) was introduced in a white, blue and red colour scheme, commemorating the opening of the mountain street over the Stelvio Pass in 1825. Production is limited to 2,758 units, a figure derived from the pass elevation. The geographic coordinates of the pass (46°31′42.96″N 10°27′09.72″E) are written on the blue side covers above the radiator; the serial number out of the total number of vehicles (e.g. 0150/2758 m. S.L.M.) is engraved on the black handlebar clamp.

The 2026 Stelvio shows no technical change, only two new colour schemes "Grigio Climbing" (grey and black) und "Verde Hiking" (green and black), both with light yellow stripes.

== Specifications ==
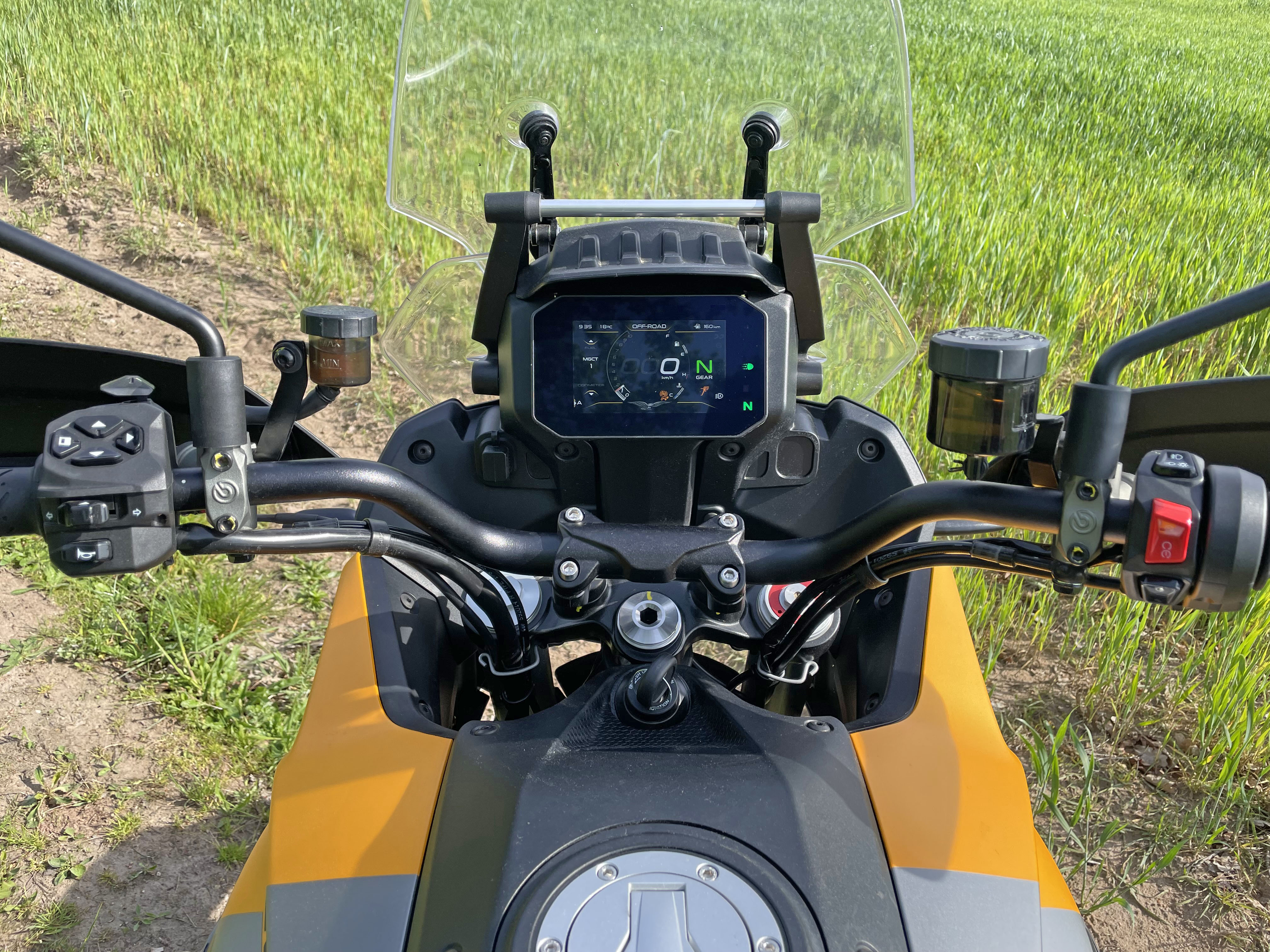
2024 display and controls

The Stelvio features an engine delivering a maximum output of 115 hp at 8,700 rpm and peak torque of 105 Nm at 6,750 rpm. The chassis adopts a high-strength steel tubular frame, combined with tubeless wire-spoke wheels measuring 19” at the front and 17” at the rear, paired with long-travel suspension. The Stelvio is the first Moto Guzzi equipped with the PFF Rider Assistance Solution, a rider-assistance platform that provides functions playing a key role in active safety, based on radar technology developed by Piaggio Fast Forward, the Piaggio Group’s robotics-focused company headquartered in Boston and founded in 2015.
