= Beta RS series =

Beta RS Dual-sport
- Manufacturer: Beta S.p.A.
- Production: 2015–present
- Predecessor: RFS/Beta motors
- Class: Dual-Sport
- Engine: single cylinder 4-stroke, liquid cooled, 42mm throttle body w/ dual injectors 349 cc (21.3 cu in); 386 cc (23.6 cu in); 431 cc (26.3 cu in); 478 cc (29.2 cu in)
- Bore / stroke: 88.0 x 57.4 mm 88.0 x 63.4 mm 95.0 x 60.8 mm 100.0 x 60.8 mm
- Ignition type: CDI Ignition
- Transmission: 6-speed constant mesh, manual, o-ring chain
- Frame type: Double-cradle molybdenum steel
- Suspension: Front: 48 mm ZF Sachs open cartridge fork 11.6" travel Rear: Sachs shock 11.4" travel
- Brakes: Front: Nissin 2-piston caliper, 260 mm floating disc Rear: Nissin 1-piston caliper, 240 mm disc
- Tires: DOT certified
- Wheelbase: 1,490 mm (58.7 in)
- Seat height: 940 mm (37 in)
- Weight: 350/390 = 237 lb (108 kg); 430/500 = 239 lb (108 kg) (dry); 350/390 = 241 lb (109 kg); 430/500 = 243 lb (110 kg) (wet)
- Fuel capacity: 9 L (2.0 imp gal; 2.4 US gal)
- Oil capacity: 1.4 L (700 ml each side)

The Beta RS series is a range of fuel-injected, 4-stroke, dual-sport, off-road motorcycles made by Italian motorcycle manufacturer Beta. The range consists of four engine displacements with a virtually identical set of components. The 350, 390, 430 and 500 all differ primarily in the bore and stroke of the cylinder. All four feature Sachs suspension, a 48mm inverted fork, and a linkage-actuated rear shock absorber.

The RS series is distinct from the ALP "Adventure" models, Beta's other dual-purpose bike.

== Model progression ==
=== 2008 RFS Motors ===
Beta introduces the 50 state street legal versions of their off-road enduro RR line-up. They are the 400 cc, 450 cc and 525 cc RS models. Beta licensed the RFS (Note: RFS is an initialism for Racing Four Stroke referring to a series of KTM designed engines.") motors from KTM for these early dual-sport offerings.

=== 2011–2014 1st generation Beta Motors ===
Beta transitions the RS from KTM engines to in-house designed, carbureted engines. They are 350 cc, 400 cc, 450 cc and 520 cc (actually 498cc). The new engines are DOHC, have separate engine and transmission lubricants with six-speed gear boxes. They sport black painted frames, Nissin brakes, Brembo hydraulic clutches, Excel Takasago rims and 45mm Marzocchi front forks with red triple clamps. The RS bikes have slightly different frame geometry resulting in shorter wheelbases (58.1 vs 58.7 for RR versions) and lower seat heights (36.6 vs 36.8). All RS dual-sport bikes sold in the United States come standard with the TrailTech Voyager GPS instrument cluster.

In 2012 Beta removes the 400 cc from the line-up

For 2013 all bikes 350, 400, 450 and 525 sport a red frame, front fender and radiator shrouds and a white rear fender. Suspension is 48mm Sachs front fork, Sachs rear shock with an aluminum body. A special edition 350 RS came equipped with 45 mm Marzocchi USD (Note: USD is an initialism for UpSide Down when referring to telescopic forks on modern motorcycles.") forks.

2014 Red frame with white plastics.

=== 2015-2019 Perfect Displacement Motors ===
The 2015 RS models (Red frame with red plastics) were available in carburated "perfect displacements” 390 cc, 430 cc and 480 cc (labeled 500).

2016 saw the addition of the 350 to the RS line. All four models are fuel injected.

In 2017 all bikes gained push button electric start. The RS models are rebranded RR-S and gained USFS spark arrestors. The bikes designated RR-S are full-on versions of their electric start, fuel-injected, four-stroke dirt bikes, outfitted with the bare minimum required for a license plate. They are electric start only with the option of an add-on kick starter.

2018 RR-S Red frame with white plastics. Red, black, and white graphics. Black Sachs open cartridge forks.

2019 350, 390, 430, 500 models available with electric start. Beta also introduced ZF Sachs SFF (Note: SFF is an initialism for Single Function Fork when referring to a design where one fork leg controls compression dampening and the other controls rebound dampening..") forks.

=== 2020–present ===
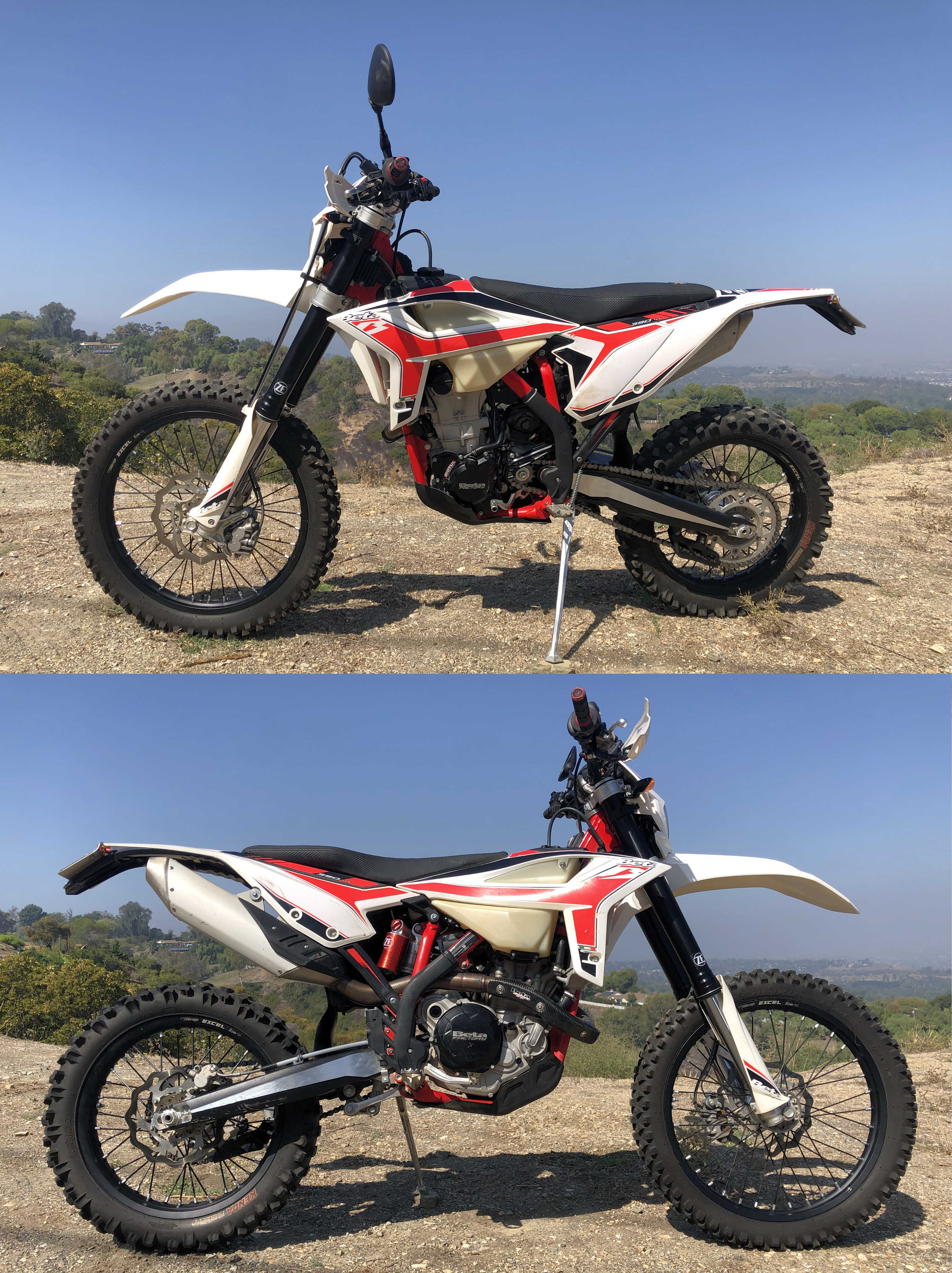
Beta 390 RR-S Dual-sport 2020 model with owner modifications

For the 2020 model year Beta revamped their "Perfect Displacement" four-strokes. The new motors alter the crank shaft position and add twin fuel injectors allowing implementation of specialized EFI mapping to increase engine performance and mixture control. All new Red frame with white plastics.

2021 Red frame with red and white plastics.

2022 Red frame with red plastics and silver finish Sachs open cartridge forks.

2023 Red frame with red plastics. Beta redesigned the attachment system for the headlight mask and front turn signals eliminating the rubber straps on some models, others continue with the rubber straps.

2024 dual sport RR-S models were renamed back to the original RS designations. Other changes include: new radiators to improve turning radius, softer seats, improved front brake lines and upgraded Sachs front suspension. The RS 390 & 500 are available in a special edition featuring KYB suspension and other "RR Race Edition" inspired components. The Special Edition bikes with KYB forks continue with the headlight mask rubber straps.

Beta did not offer the RS dual sport models in 2025.

2026 the RS dual sport line has an updated frame, X-trig handlebar mounts and a longer head pipe exhaust with a removable spark arrestor, a new larger volume rear brake master cylinder and now comes with Mitas’ Enduro Trail XT+ tires. The engine map and traction control buttons are relocated in the handlebar pad. The RS 390 & 500 are again available in a special edition featuring an improved, larger backbone tube frame along with KYB suspension and other special edition components.
