= Yamaha DT125RE =

- Manufacturer: Yamaha
- Production: 2005–2007/2008
- Class: Enduro-supermotard
- Engine: 123 cc liquid cooled, Single, two-stroke, Reed valve
- Top speed: 110 km/h (68 mph)
- Power: 12.92 kW (17.33 hp) @ 7,000 rpm
- Transmission: manual 6-speed
- Suspension: Front: 41mm Telescopic fork Rear: Swingarm (monocross)
- Brakes: Front: 230mm Disc; Rear: 230mm Disc
- Tires: Front: 2.75-21; Rear: 4.10-18
- Wheelbase: 260 mm (10 in)
- Dimensions: L: 865 mm (34.1 in); W: 1,165 mm (45.9 in); H: 1,340 mm (53 in)
- Seat height: 885mm
- Weight: 116 kg (256 lb) (dry)
- Fuel capacity: 10 L (2.2 imp gal; 2.6 US gal)
- Oil capacity: 1.2 L (1.3 US qt)

The Yamaha DT 125 RE is a trail bike produced from 2004 to 2007 (some can have 2008 as the registration year).

The bike is a 125cc two-stroke single cylinder limited to 11 kW which makes it very popular for teens with an A1 license.

It shares an engine with the DT125R, the Derbi GPR 125, the TZR125 and the TDR125.

Frame and plastics have been updated to be more durable and modern looking compared to the DT125 model.
