= Yamaha DT50MX =

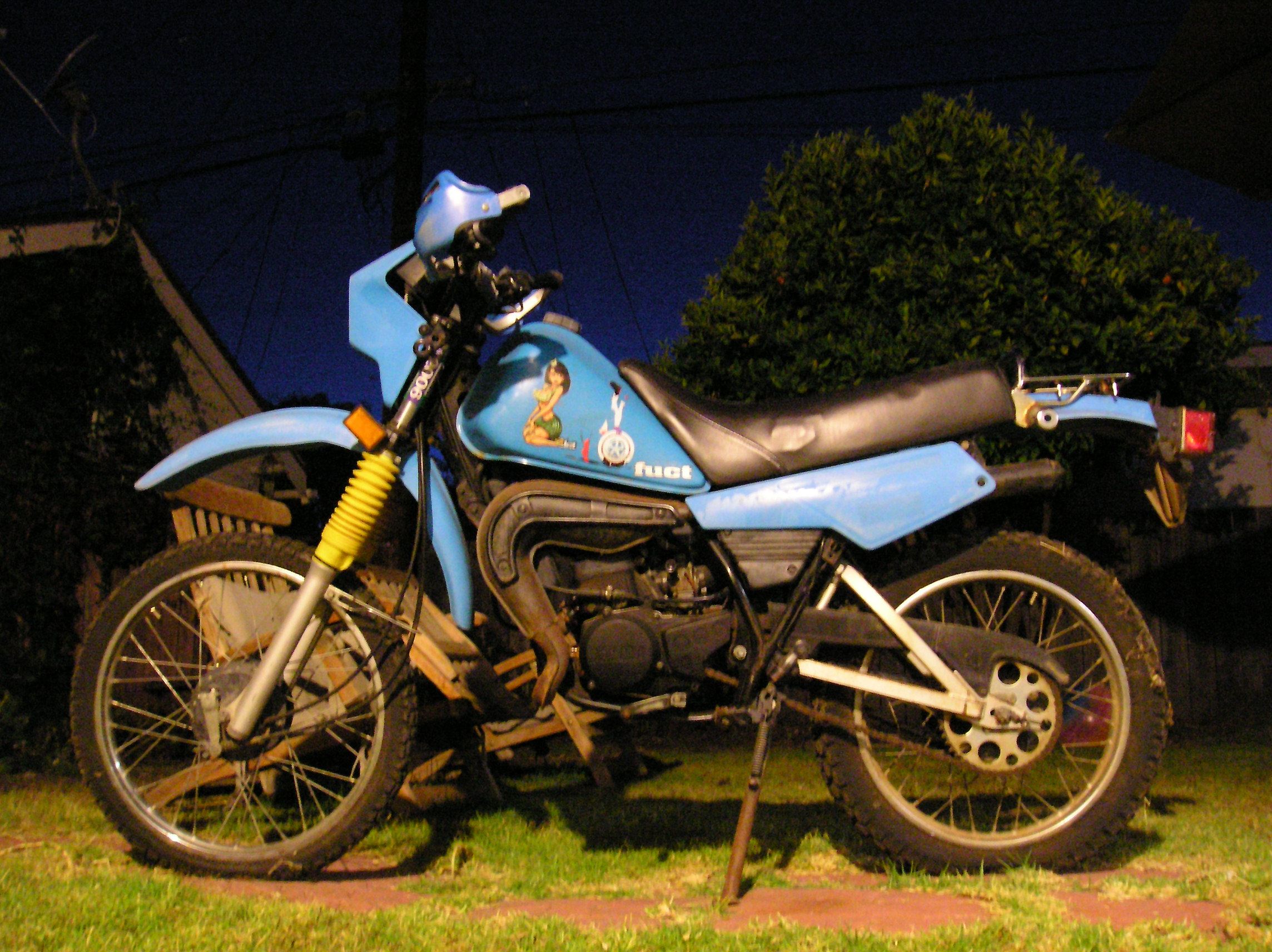
- Manufacturer: Yamaha
- Production: 1981–1996
- Predecessor: DT50M
- Successor: DT50MX2
- Class: Motocross
- Engine: 49 cc (3.0 cu in), two-stroke, single
- Ignition type: Contactpoint, CDI
- Transmission: 5-speed, multi-plate wet clutch
- Suspension: Front: Telescopic forks Rear: Yamaha Mono-cross
- Brakes: Drum front and rear
- Tires: Front: 2.50-21-4PR; Rear: 3.00-18-4PR
- Wheelbase: 1,280 mm (50 in)
- Dimensions: L: 2,055 mm (80.9 in); W: 835 mm (32.9 in); H: 1,135 mm (44.7 in)
- Seat height: 820 mm (32 in)
- Fuel capacity: 8.5 L (2.2 US gal)
- Related: DT80MX, DT50-LC
- Ground clearance: 260 mm (10 in)

The Yamaha DT50MX is the most common 50 cc (3.1 cu in) motorcycle in the Yamaha DT series. It superseded the DT50M when introduced in June 1981 and can easily be identified by its Mono-Cross(MX) rear suspension with a silver painted square-section rear swinging arm and a more angular tank as opposed to the more rounded one found on the M variant. The 'MX' designation was commonly used on Yamaha motorcycles fitted with the 'Mono-Cross' rear suspension, which was the first to employ a single shock-absorber. It remained in production largely unchanged until 1996, gaining only a CDI ignition system and a change to square bodied direction indicator lights in 1986 with the introduction of the 2FN model (sometimes referred to as the MX-S). The moped is very common in Scandinavia where its leading competitor was the Honda MT50 and can be ridden on a CBT at 16 in the UK.

An "LC" (liquid-cooled) model was released to the US and Europe, featuring a liquid-cooled 49cc engine, a taller fuel tank and a different headlight nacelle with a rectangular air vent beneath the headlamp.

Intake was by means of either a Mikuni vm18 smoothbore flatslide or a TK carburettor and the exhaust was expansion chamber type with interchangeable addons (BigOne and DEP manufactured an improved system),

There was also a Paris Dakar style bodykit available which featured a wraparound fairing incorporating a stationary headlamp nacelle, different side panels, sump guard and a tank cover, these were originally only available in white with red decals.
