= Yamaha DT50M =

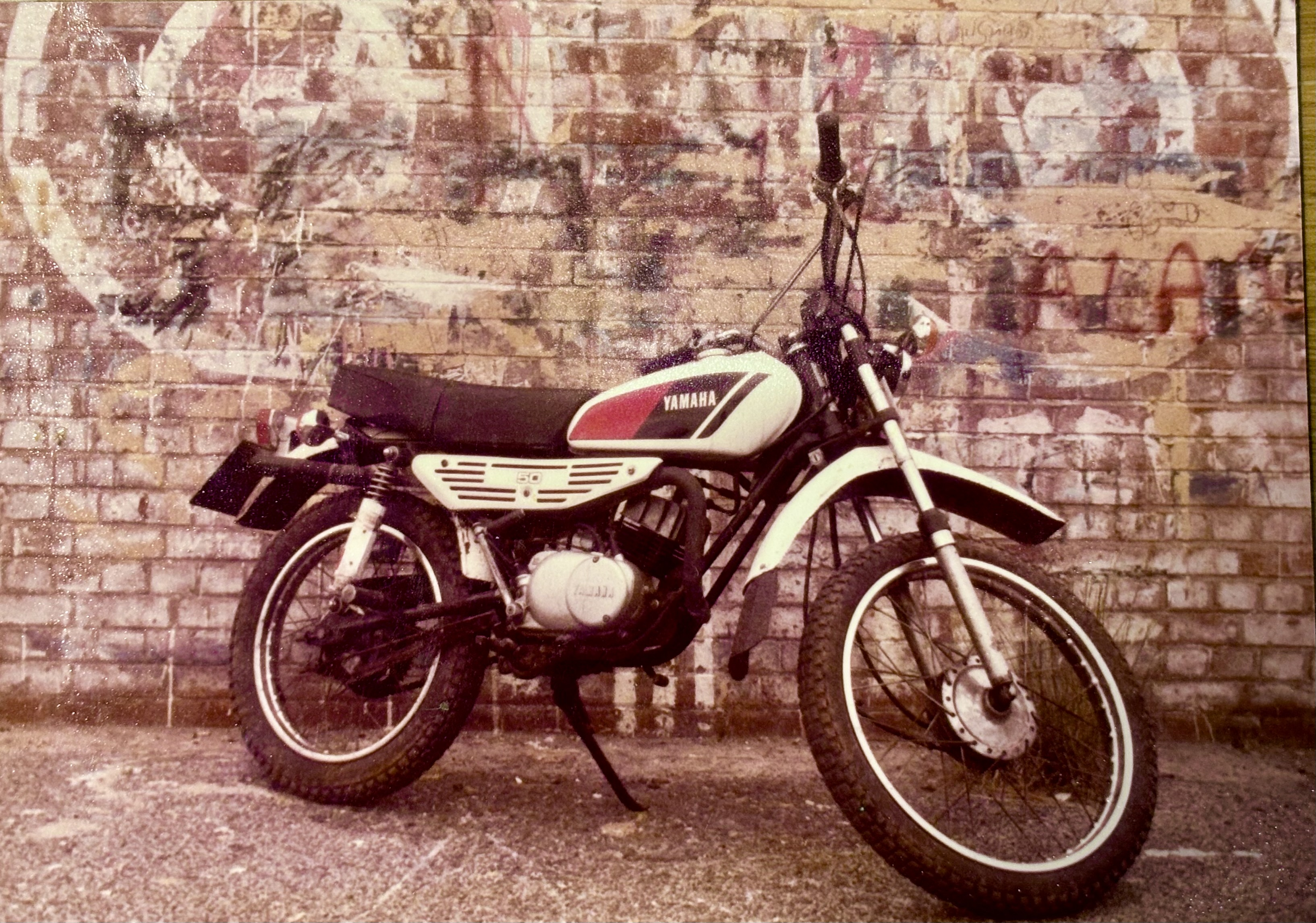
- Manufacturer: Yamaha
- Production: 1978–1981
- Successor: DT50MX
- Class: Dual-sport
- Engine: 49 cc (3.0 cu in), 2-stroke, torque Induction, single
- Bore / stroke: 40.0 mm × 39.7 mm (1.57 in × 1.56 in)
- Compression ratio: 5.7:1
- Top speed: 40km/h
- Power: 2,8Ps
- Ignition type: Kick starter
- Transmission: 4-speed manual, Multi-plate wet, gear
- Suspension: Front: Telescopic forks Rear; Twin shock swingarm
- Brakes: Front: Drum; Rear: Drum
- Tires: Front: 2.20-19-4PR; Rear: 3.00-17-4PR
- Wheelbase: 1,210 mm (48 in)
- Dimensions: L: 1,860 mm (73 in); W: 805 mm (31.7 in); H: 1,045 mm (41.1 in)
- Seat height: 780 mm (31 in)
- Weight: 72 kg (159 lb) (dry); 80 kg (180 lb) (wet)
- Fuel capacity: 4.7 L (1.2 US gal)
- Oil capacity: 1.2 L (0.32 US gal)
- Ground clearance: 225 mm (8.9 in)

The Yamaha DT50M is an entry-level 50 cc (3.1 cu in) motorcycle in the Yamaha DT series, produced from 1978 to 1981. It is a dual-purpose street/trail bike primarily aimed at novice motorcyclists.

The DT50M has twin rear shocks and 19"/17" front and rear wheels. The DT50MX, which is a later model of the DTM50M, has larger 21"/18" wheels and a mono shock rear suspension. After its production and high sales, Yamaha decided to produce a street bike variant of the DT50M, which was given the model number RD50M.

The Yamaha DT50MX was given similar treatment to the Yamaha RD50MX.

== Identification (UK) ==
Model	Frame/Engine number	Production code	Model year
DT50M	2M9-000101 on	2M9	1978
DT50M	2M9-100101 on	2M9	1979
DT50M	2M9-200101 on	2M9	1980

Note: The Model year is not necessarily the same as the year of sale or first registration.
