= Yamaha TW200 =

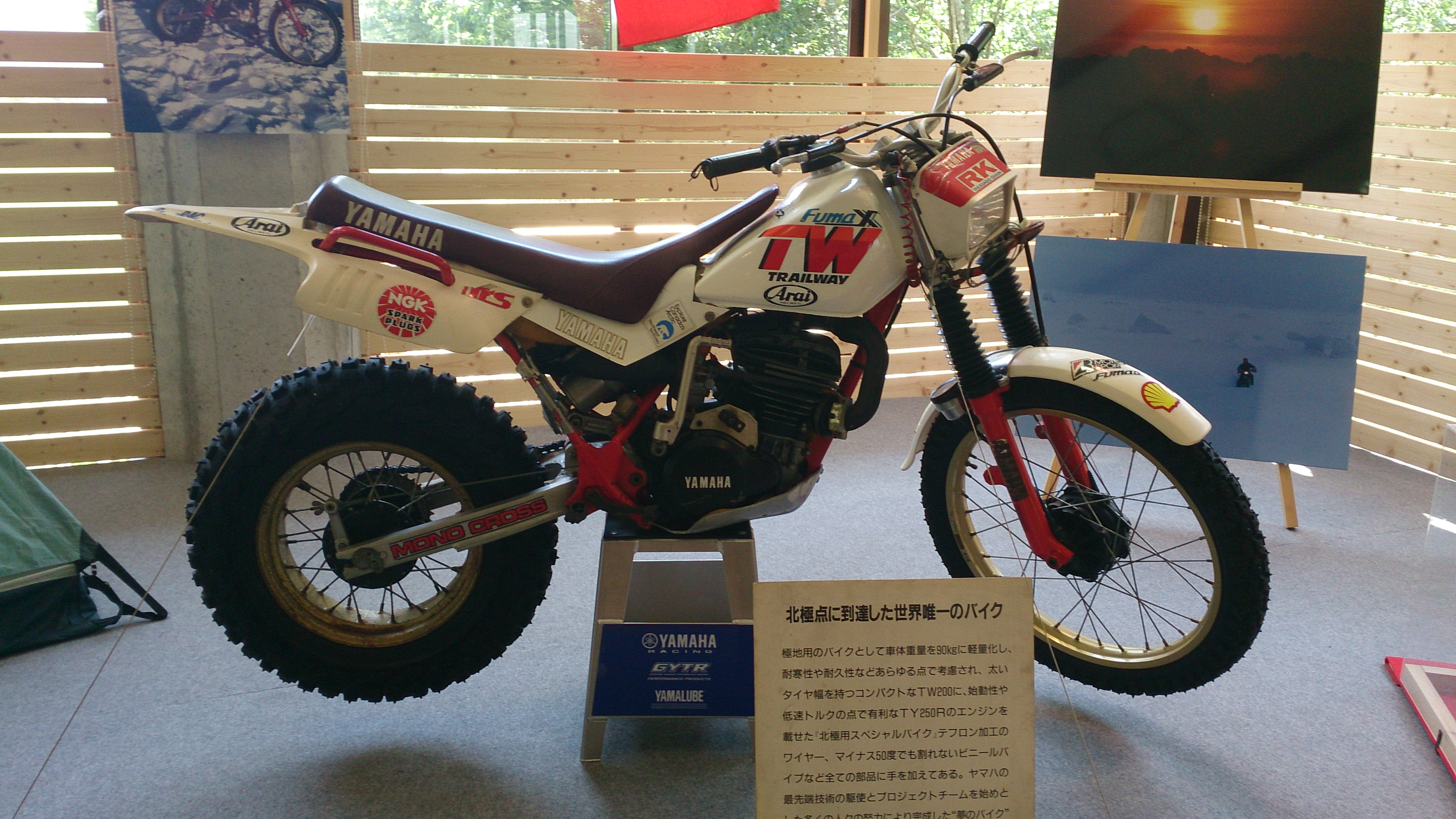
- Manufacturer: Yamaha
- Production: 1987–present
- Class: Dual-sport; Agricultural
- Engine: 196cc single
- Top speed: 66–73 miles per hour (106–117 km/h)
- Transmission: 5-speed Manual
- Brakes: 220 mm disc (front); 110 mm drum (rear)
- Tires: 130/80-18 (front); 180/80-14 (rear)
- Wheelbase: 1,330 mm (52.2 in)
- Dimensions: L: 2,090 mm (82.3 in); W: 820 mm (32.3 in); H: 1,120 mm (44.1 in)
- Seat height: 31.1 inches (790 mm)
- Weight: 127 kg (279 lb) (wet)
- Fuel capacity: 1.8 gal
- Oil capacity: 1.16 US quarts or 1.1 liters
- Fuel consumption: 78 mpg_{‑US} (3.0 l/100 km)

The Yamaha TW200 is a 196 cc single cylinder dual-sport motorcycle manufactured and marketed by Yamaha since 1987. TW is an abbreviation for Trail Way. In 2001 an update was made that removed the kick start and replaced the front drum brake with a disc brake. Due to its large tires, it has been compared to the 2-wheel-drive Rokon and has been called a "two-wheeled quad".

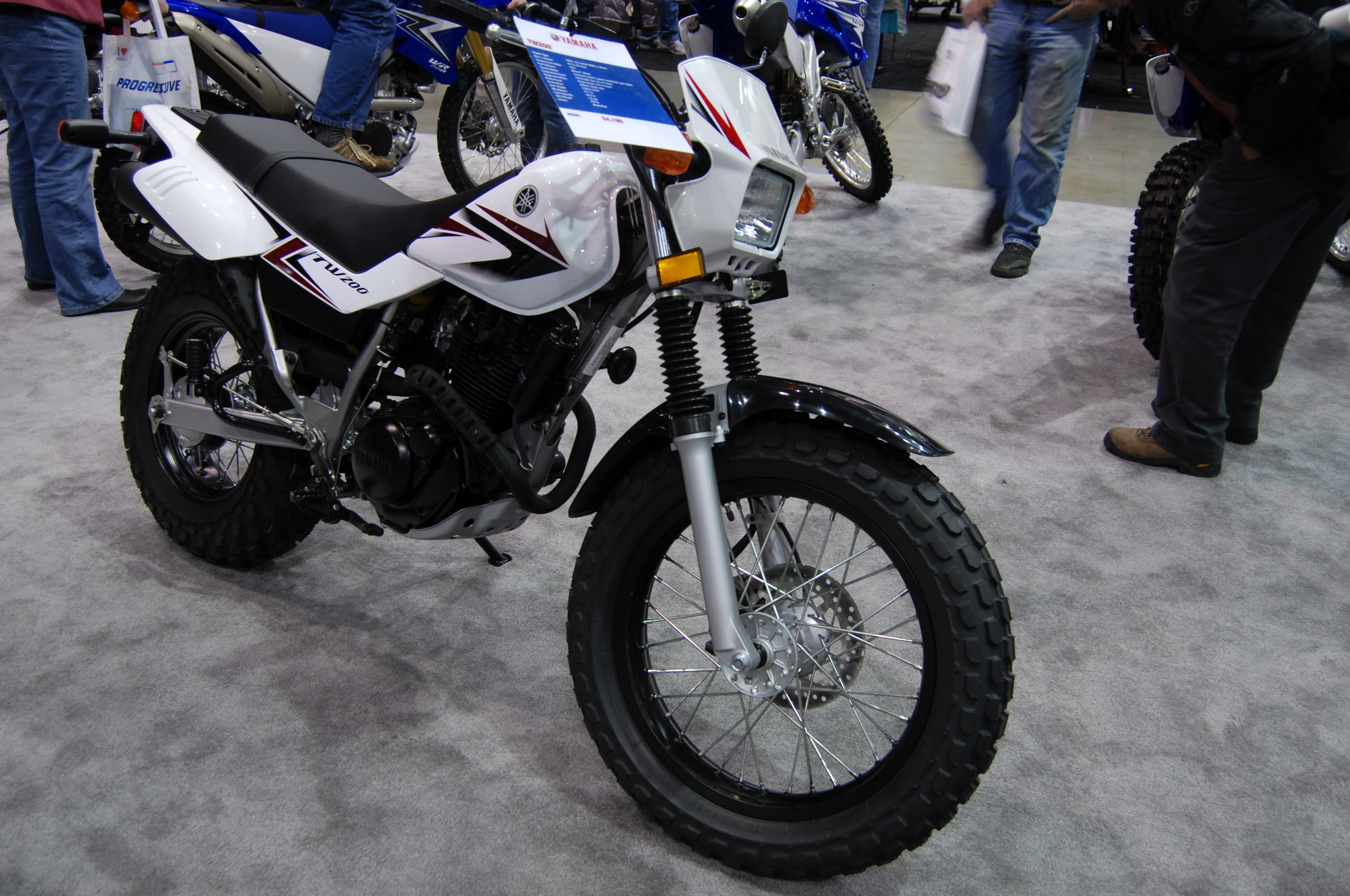
2010 TW200

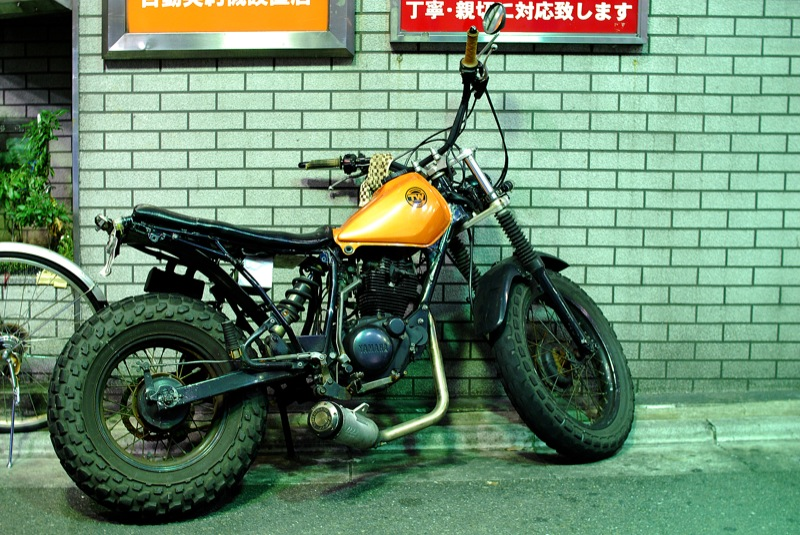
2007 TW200

In a review of the 2020 model, Ultimate Motorcycling said, "If you're patient and persistent, the TW can take you almost anywhere."

== Key changes by year ==
- 1987 – One off AC electrical system; AC headlight.
- 1988 – Electrical system revised, mostly DC electrical system.
- 1987-1991 / 1992-2000 – Two different front‑brake shoe sizes.
- 1996 – Front fork drain screws discontinued.
- 2001 – Front disc brake introduced; rear foot‑peg offset altered; charging system upgraded to 55 W; CV carburetor with opposite‑side throttle cable; inlet manifold dimensions tweaked; kick‑starter omitted (optional aftermarket); trip meter added; several electrical connectors revised; handlebar controls refreshed; automatic cam‑chain adjuster added; exhaust mounting modified.
- 2002 – Smaller diameter fuel cap.
- 2009 – Base cylinder gasket updated.
- 2017 – New rear shock unit.
