= Honda MB50 =

MB50
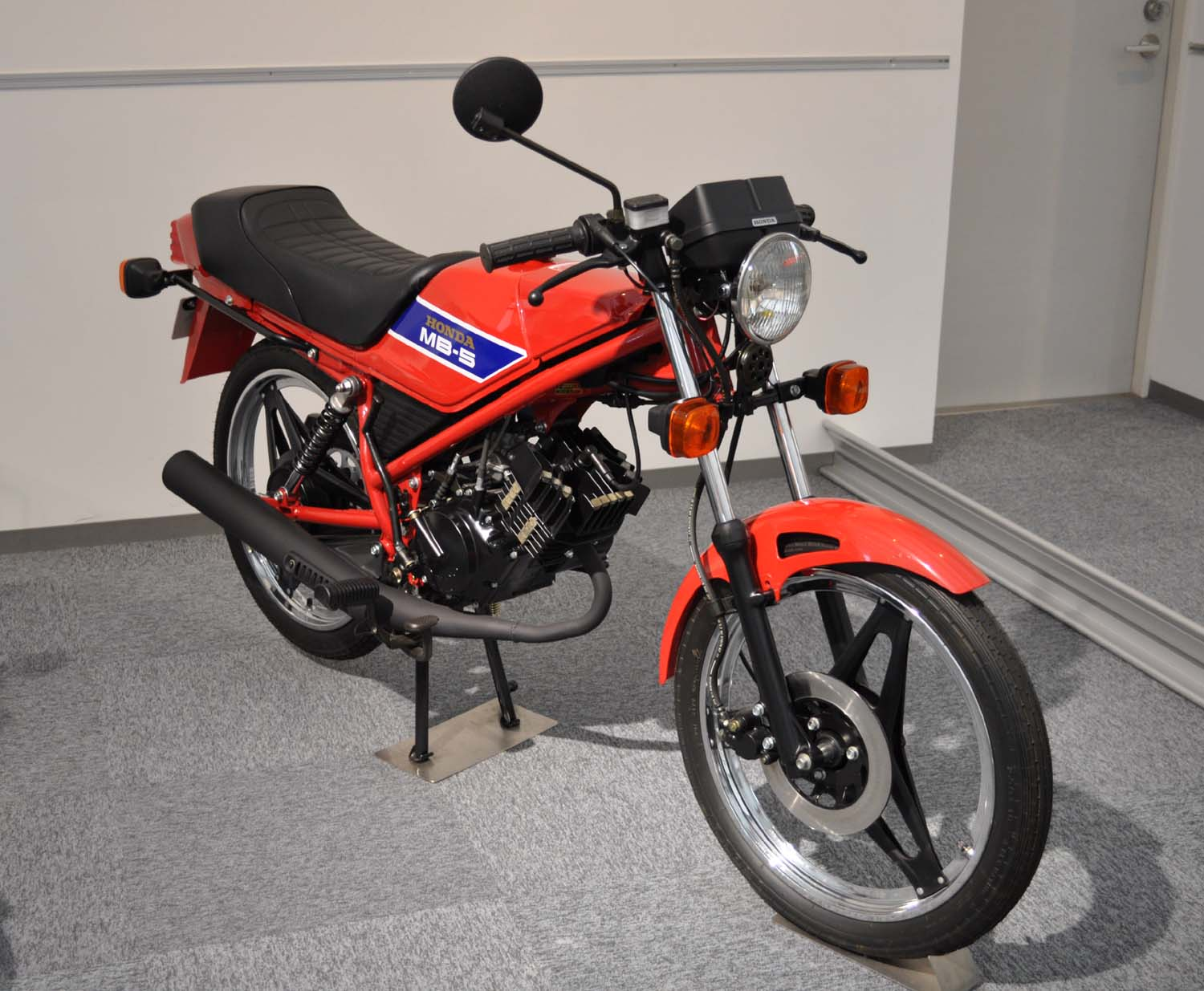
- 1979 Honda MB50
- Manufacturer: Honda
- Also called: Honda MB5
- Production: 1979–1988 (Europe); 1979–1981 (UK); 1982 (US)
- Class: Moped
- Engine: 49 cc (3.0 cu in) two-stroke, single
- Transmission: Wet multi-plate clutch, 4-speed 5-speed 6-speed manual, chain drive
- Related: Honda MT50

The MB50 (also named the MB5 in US and Canadian markets) is an air-cooled, two-stroke, single-cylinder Honda motorcycle, produced from 1979 into the late 1980s. The MB was the road oriented version of the Honda MT50. Sales ended in 1981 in the UK and 1982 in the US (the only year imported), but sales continued in other European countries until 1988.

The MB5 was a very light motorcycle, filling a similar transportation role to a motorscooter, though styled like a sport bike, with a 49 cc (3.0 cu in) two-stroke single-cylinder engine, and a 5-speed manual transmission. The MB5 also had a speedometer, a tachometer (with a redline of 10,500 rpm), front disc brake, and Honda's comstar wheels. The MB-5 was short-lived in the US; Honda only imported it in 1982, it was more popular in Europe (see MB/T/X series).

== Frame, Suspension, & Gas Tank ==
The motorcycle uses a cross line backbone frame design wherein the engine is mounted from the main frame spine running the length of the bike. The rear suspension pivots from a double-sided swingarm connected to twin shock absorbers with adjustable preload. The front suspension uses a telescopic shocks.

The motorcycle used the Honda Comstar rims fitted with 2.50 x 18 tires on both the front and rear wheel. The front wheel utilised a disk brake, and the rear wheel a drum brake.

== United States ==
The MB5 was only imported to the United States for 1982. As much of the United States did not utilize graduated licenses the bikes were unrestricted unlike those sold in some parts of the European market. Distinctive visual differences between US market MB5's and other worldwide examples include different turn signal mounts, rear grab bar design, the lack of any two-seat options, the use of regular style handle-bars as opposed to clip-on styles, no headlight fairing option.

Due to the inconsistent licensing laws between states, MB5's often classify between mopeds, scooters, and motorcycles based on frame design, driveline, top-speed, among other factors.
