= Moto Guzzi V85 TT =

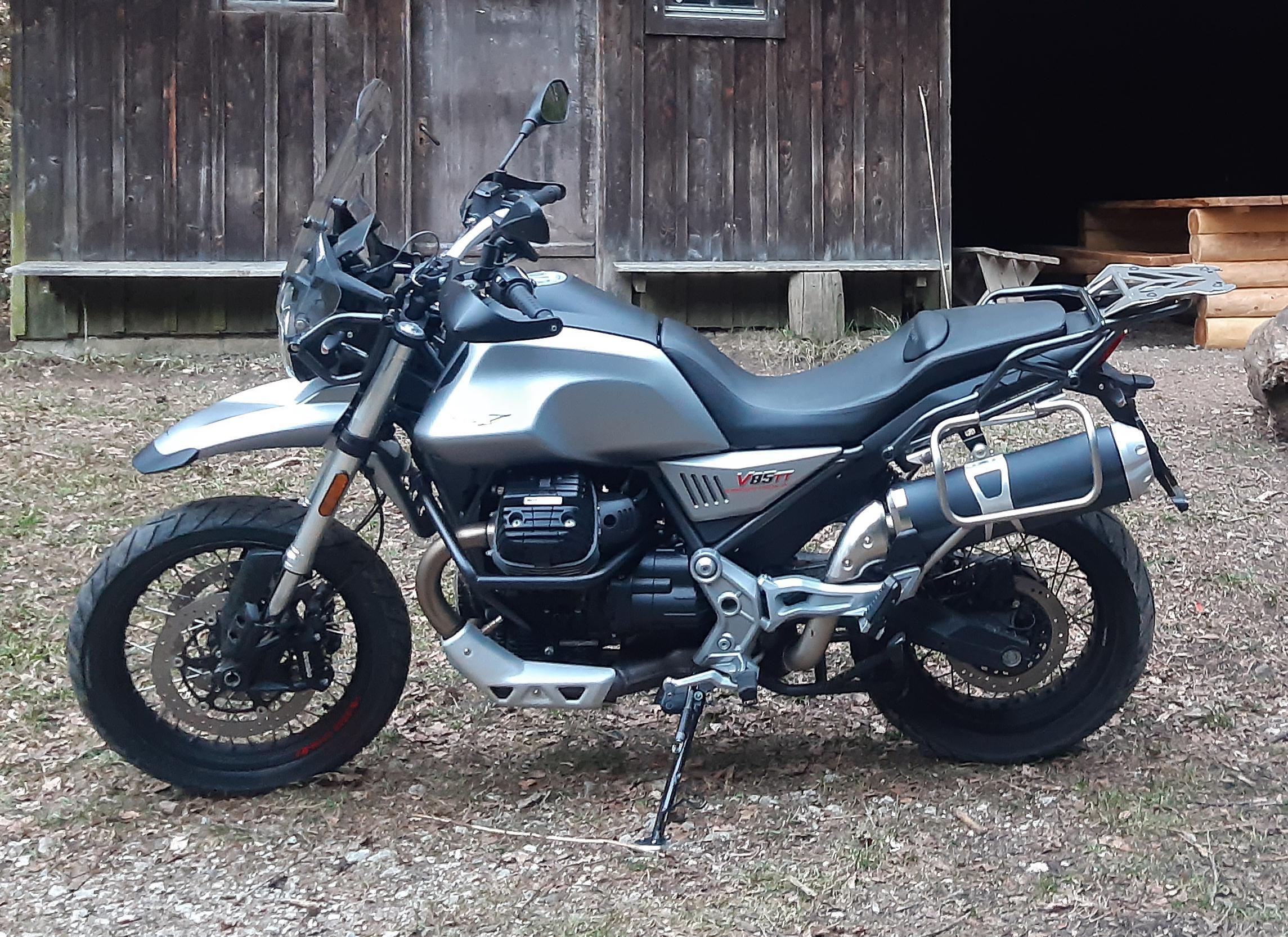
- Manufacturer: Moto Guzzi
- Predecessor: Moto Guzzi Stelvio
- Class: Enduro
- Engine: 853 cc (52.1 cu in) OHV 2V/cyl, four-stroke, 90° V-twin
- Bore / stroke: 84 mm × 77 mm (3.3 in × 3.0 in)
- Transmission: 6-speed, manual, shaft drive
- Suspension: Front: telescopic forks Rear: Single-sided swingarm
- Brakes: Front: double Disc; Rear: single disc
- Related: Moto Guzzi Breva

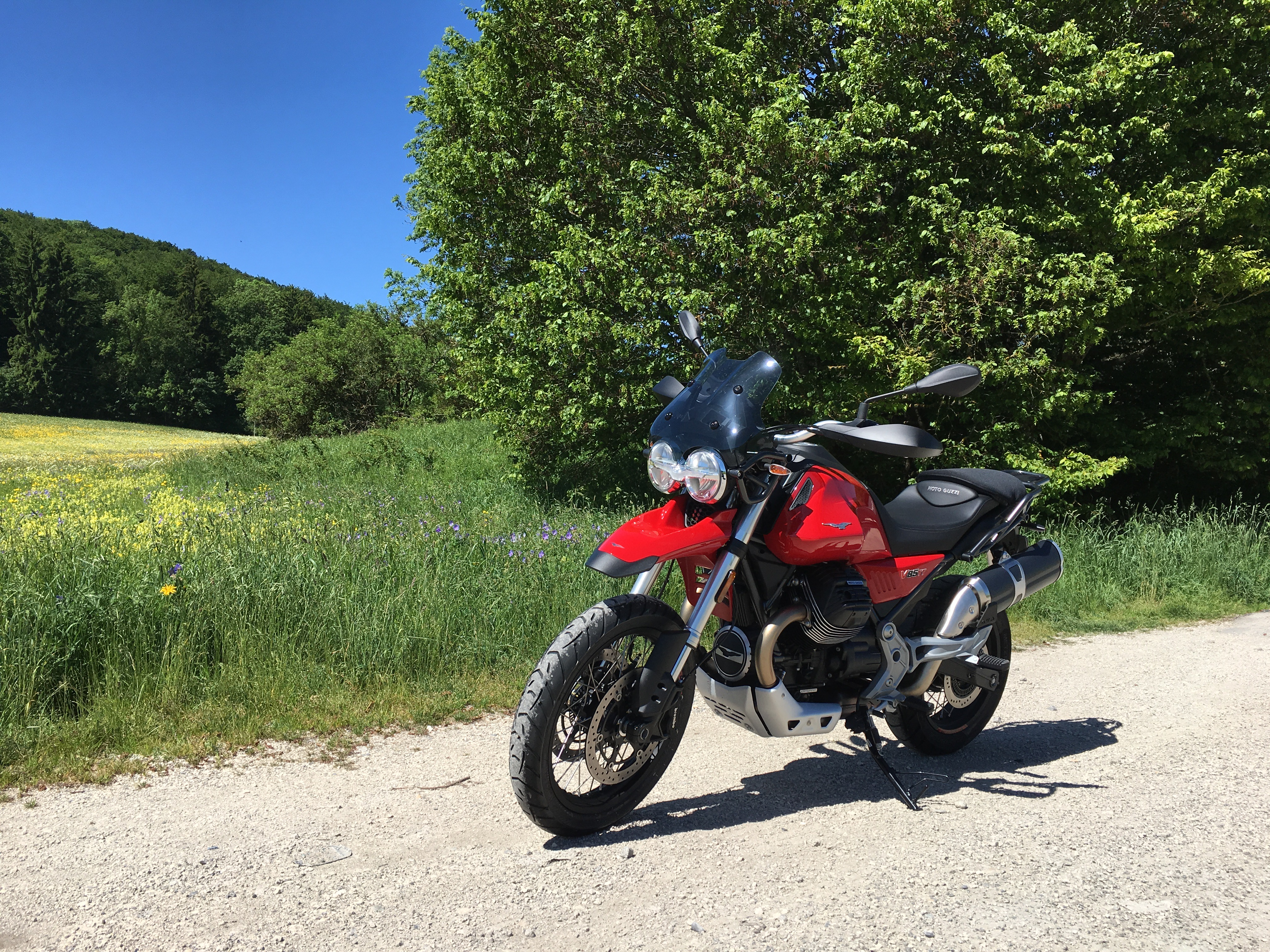
Moto Guzzi V85 TT in the color "Rosso Vulcano". The cushion on the passenger seat is a third party accessory

The Moto Guzzi V85 TT is styled after a '70s Enduro motorcycle from Moto Guzzi, which belongs to the middleweight adventure bike category. The motorcycle was announced end of 2017 and entered production in spring 2019. It is supposed to combine classic styling with modern equipment and it targets road and light off-road use. This is reflected by the model name, where "TT" stands for "Tutto Terreno", which is Italian for "all terrain".

== Engine and transmission ==
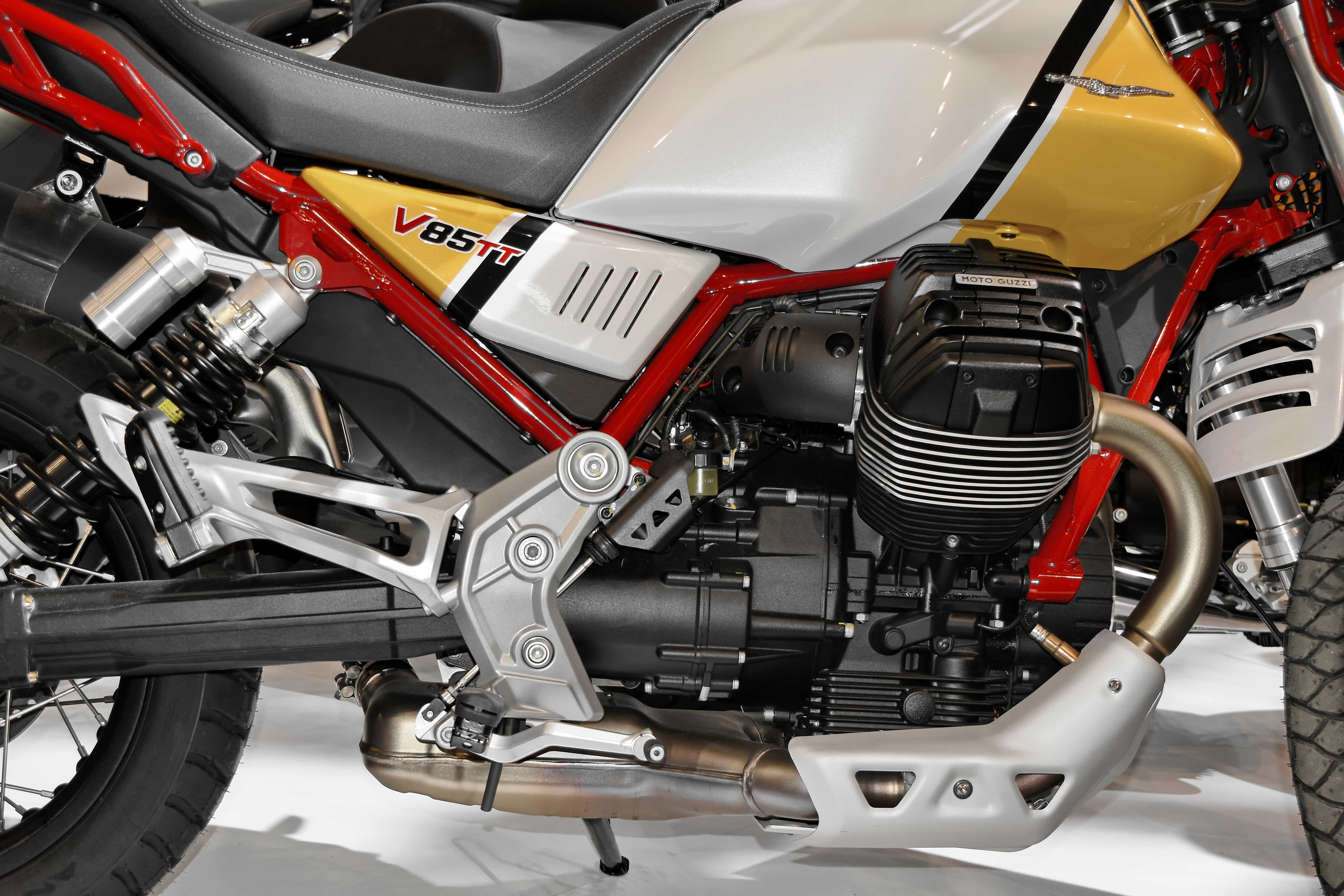
Moto Guzzi V 85 TT engine

The engine is, typical for Moto Guzzi, an air-cooled longitudinal 90° V-twin Four-stroke engine. It features two valves per cylinder, which are controlled by one central camshaft via push rods and rocker arms. The intake valve is made of Titanium, which allows for a sharp camshaft profile due to its low weight. Fuel is injected electronically and the air intake is controlled by a central Throttle body, with a diameter of 52 mm. The throttle body is operated electronically (i.e. Ride by wire), allowing for different response settings. The engine generates 59 kW (80 PS) at 7750/min from its displacement of 853 cm^{3} and a compression ratio of 10,5:1. Maximum Torque is 80 Nm at 5000/min, while over 70 Nm are available between 3500/min and 8000/min. The power is transmitted to the rear wheel via 6-gear transmission and a shaft drive. The Shaft drive is unique to the V 85 TT, which is the only middleweight adventure bike to feature it (as of April 2019). The motorcycle is homologated to the Euro-5 emission standard and has a fuel consumption of 4,9 L /100 km according to the WMTC cycle, which equals 118 g CO_{2} per kilometre.

== Chassis ==
The V85 TT has a trellis frame made of steel and it used its engine as a load bearing element. Front suspension features a 41 mm Upside-Down fork with 170 mm of travel, which is adjustable in preload and damping. The rear suspension uses a single shock between the swing arm and the frame. It offers 170 mm of travel and adjustable preload and damping, just as the front suspension. The braking system comprises Brembo dual floating 320-mm Disc brakes at the front wheel and a single 260-mm disc at the rear wheel. Moto Guzzi sells the V85 TT with wire wheels for the Travel and base trims and spoke wheels for the Strada trim. The front wheel is 19 inches in diameter with a 110/80 Tyre, while the rear wheel is 17 inches with a 150/70 tyre.

== Equipment ==
At production start five colors were offered (for EU market), allocated to two different trims: either dual color trim with red trellis frame („Giallo Sahara“, „Rosso Kalahari“) or single color with black trellis frame („Grigio Atacama“, „Azzurro Atlante“, „Rosso Vulcano“). The dual color variant come along with Michelin Anakee Adventure tyres and a premium leather seat, while the single color variant is sold with a basic seat and Metzeler Tourance Next tyres. Moto Guzzi sells the dual color variant for 12.300 € or €11.990 for the single color variant respectively (German market).
