= Honda MT50 =

MT50
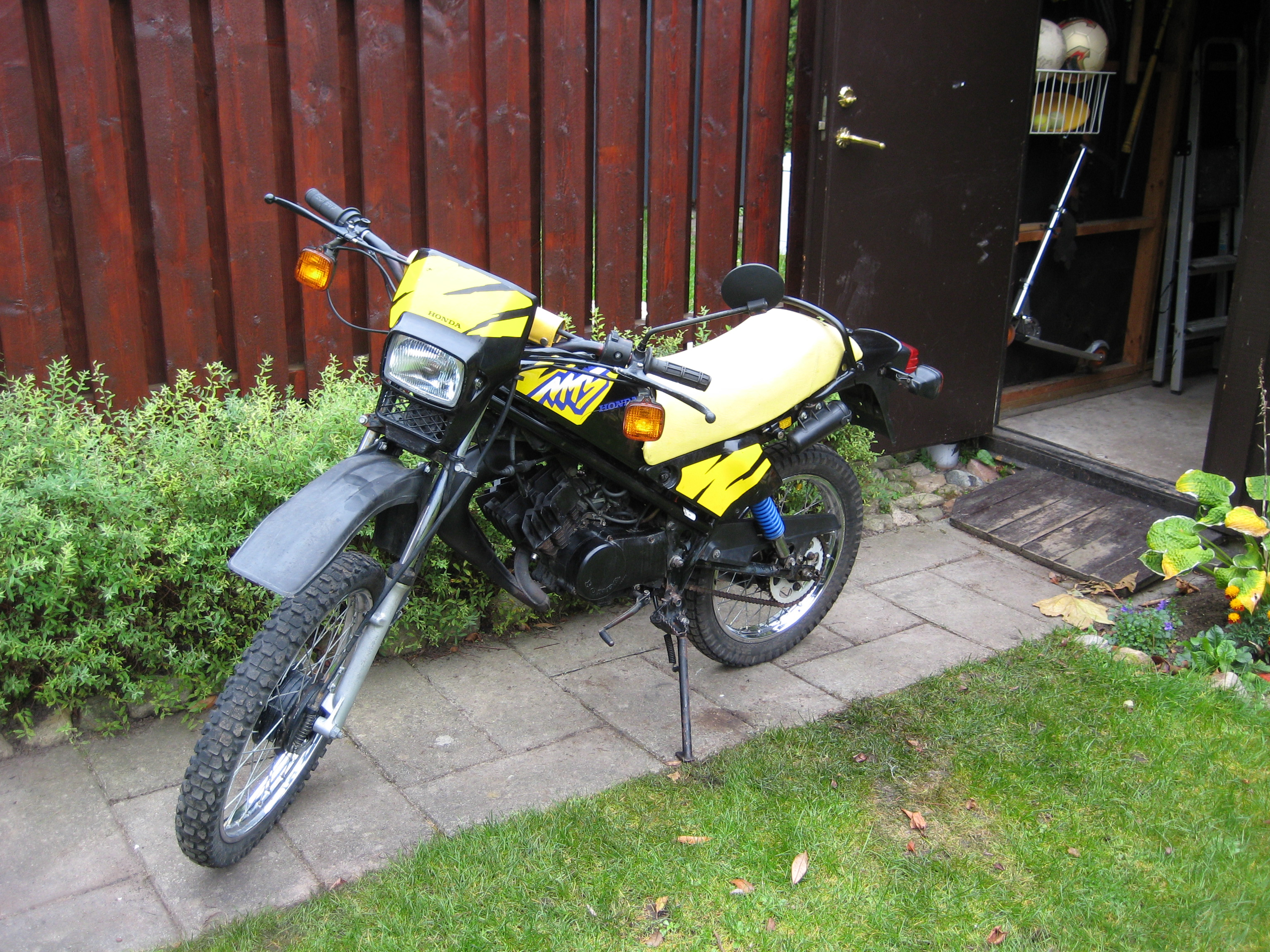
- 1997 Honda MT50
- Manufacturer: Honda
- Also called: Honda MT5
- Production: 1979–2000
- Class: Moped
- Engine: 49.6 cc (3.03 cu in), reed valve, two-stroke single
- Bore / stroke: 39 mm × 41.4 mm (1.54 in × 1.63 in)
- Compression ratio: 6.4:1
- Power: 2.55bhp @ 6,500 rpm
- Torque: 2ft-lbs @ 6,000rpm
- Ignition type: CDI
- Transmission: 5-speed manual, chain final drive
- Frame type: Steel spine
- Brakes: 110 mm (4.3 in) single leading shoe drum brakes front and rear
- Dimensions: L: 6.38 ft (1.94 m); W: 2.38 ft (0.73 m); H: 3.46 ft (1.05 m)
- Weight: 82 kg (181 lb) (dry)
- Fuel capacity: 6.8 L (1.5 imp gal; 1.8 US gal)
- Related: Honda MB50

The Honda MT50 is an off-road styled moped, common in Scandinavia and the Netherlands but also sold in other countries including the United Kingdom and United States, that is more commonly known as the Honda MT5. Some countries had restricted versions designed to be ridden by learners. Production for European markets was mainly carried out in Belgium, Spain, and Sweden. Its leading competitor was the Yamaha DT50MX. Production started 1979 and ended 2000.

It stopped being imported in 1983 to be replaced by the Honda MTX50 but was reintroduced in 1990 (1985 in the UK). The reintroduced machine had a changed specification and underwent further regular updates in the next few years, meaning that not all parts were interchangeable. Its sister was the MB50/MB5 which was the road-styled version of the bike.

The Honda MT5 is now one of the older classic mopeds along with the Suzuki TS50X and the old Yamaha dt 50
