= Yamaha DT125 =

Motorcycle first released 1974

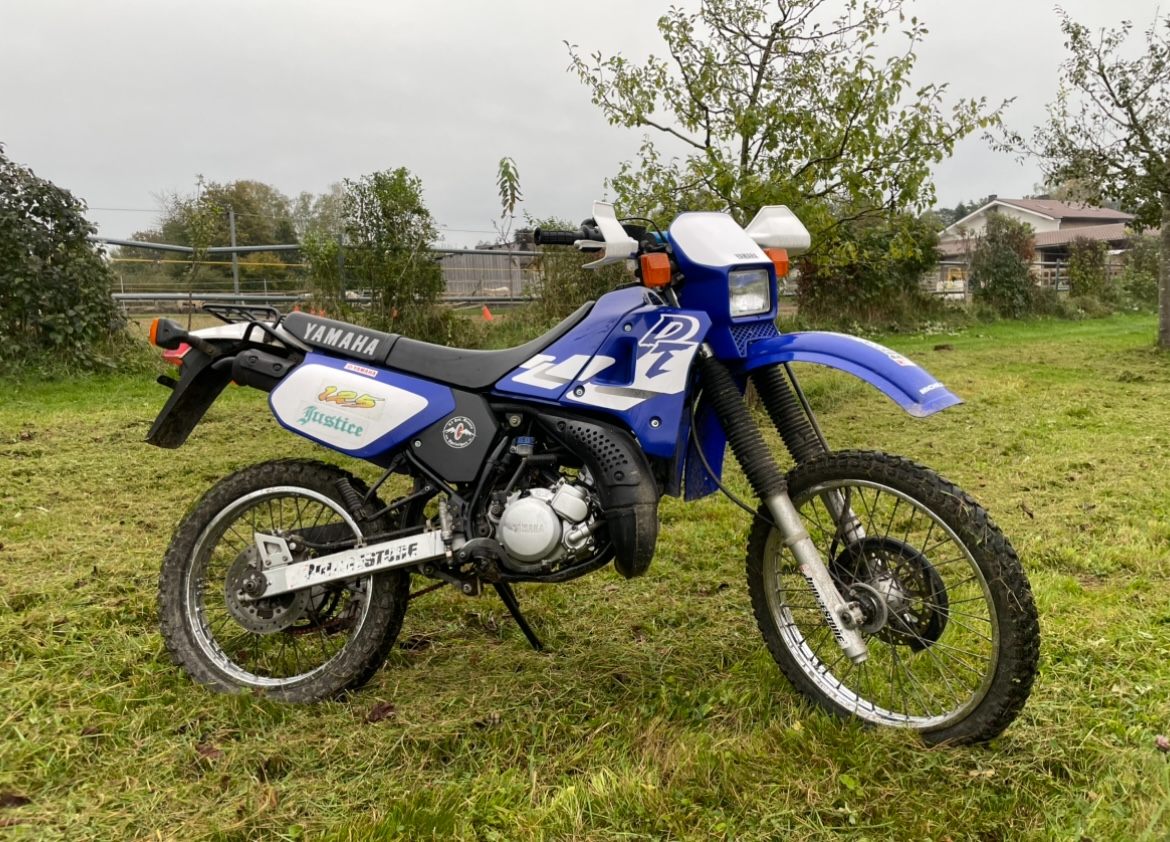
- Yamaha DT125R
- Manufacturer: Yamaha
- Production: 1974–2008
- Class: Enduro/Supermoto
- Engine: 123 cc air-cooled/liquid cooled, Single, two-stroke, Reed valve
- Top speed: 130 km/h (81 mph)
- Power: 12.92 kW (17.33 hp) @ 7,000 rpm
- Transmission: manual 6-speed (1974 is a 5-speed)
- Suspension: Front: Telescopic fork Rear: Swingarm (monocross) (1974 is not a monocross)
- Brakes: Front: Drum/Disc; Rear: Drum/Disc
- Wheelbase: 260 mm (10 in)
- Dimensions: L: 865 mm (34.1 in); W: 1,165 mm (45.9 in); H: 1,340 mm (53 in)
- Weight: 116 kg (256 lb) (dry)
- Fuel capacity: 9.5 L (2.1 imp gal; 2.5 US gal)
- Oil capacity: 0.9 L (0.95 US qt)

The Yamaha DT125 is a motorcycle produced by Yamaha Motor Company that was first launched in 1974 as the DT125A and is still sold in some markets to this day. The model designation DT indicates that it is a two-stroke, off-road-styled motorcycle, it has a raised exhaust, handlebars with cross members, universal tires, and adequate ground clearance for an off-road enduro motorcycle or trail motorcycle. The USA received the last DT125H in 1981.

When first launched, the DT125 had a single-cylinder, air-cooled, two-stroke engine, a cradle-style tubular steel frame, conventional telescopic front forks and dual shock swingarm rear suspension, and drum brakes front and rear. Over the years the model received numerous updates and restyles, the dates and specifications of which vary between markets. Notable changes include the appearance of a single shock absorber rear swingarm in 1977, which Yamaha referred to as Mono-cross, or MX for short, a feature that appeared on many of Yamaha's other small and medium-sized motorcycles at a similar time.

In 1982 the DT125 received a major restyle and gained a liquid-cooled engine to become the DT125LC. In 1984 the electrics were upgraded to 12v and YPVS was added, the front brake drum was changed to a disc, and rising rate rear suspension was fitted with the introduction of the DT125LC mk3. Another restyle in 1987 brought the DT125R, the most noticeable specification change being the swap to a rear disc brake.
