= Dual-sport motorcycle =

Motorcycle designed for on and off-road use

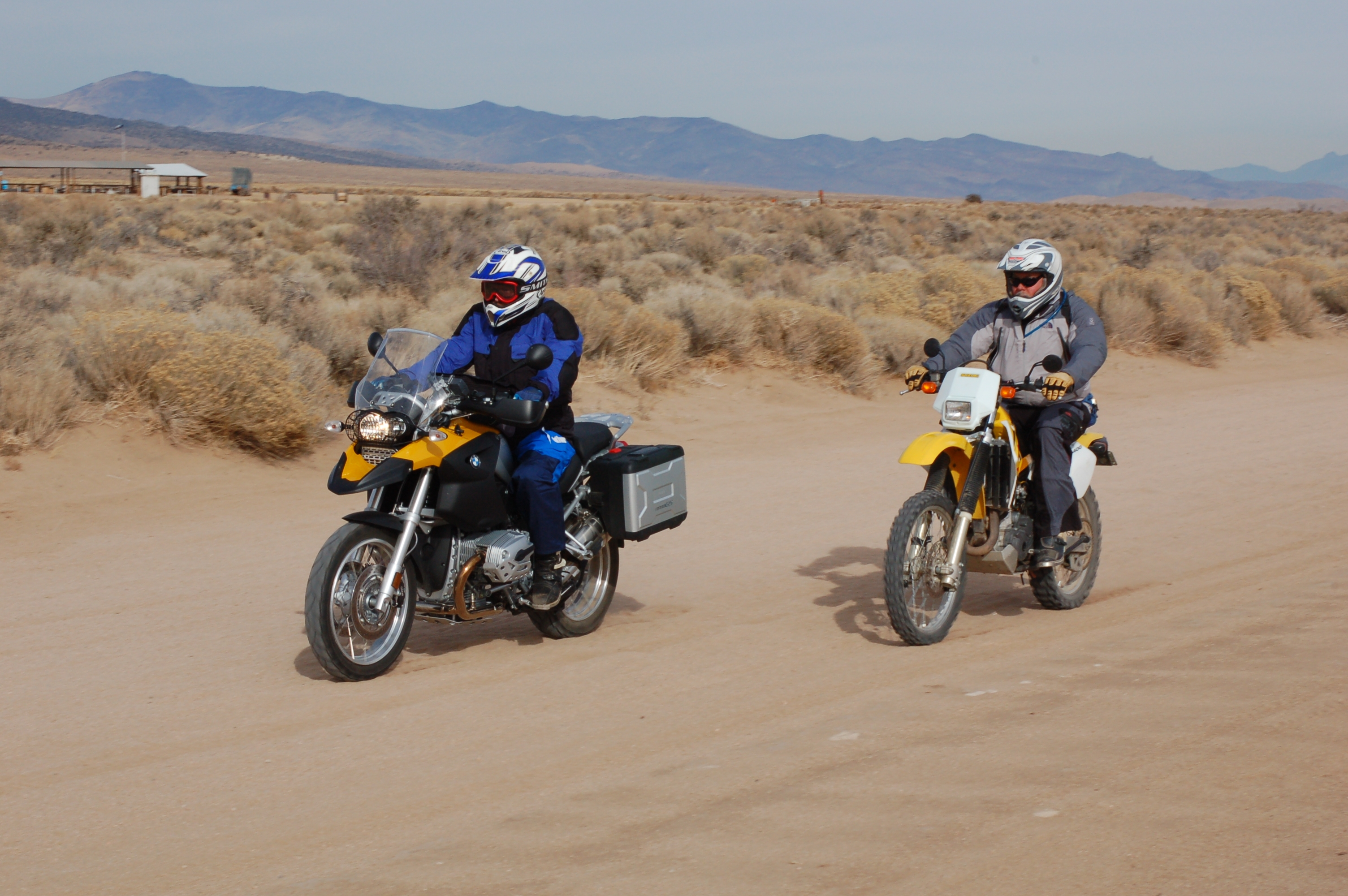
A BMW R1200GS (left) and Suzuki DR-Z400 (right), examples of adventure and dual-sport bikes.

A dual-sport motorcycle is a category of motorcycle that is designed for varying degrees of off-roading while still being street-legal as defined by US DOT regulations. Dual-sports are equipped with lights, speedometers, mirrors, horns, license plates, turn signals, and mufflers with spark arrestors and may have noise output standards all to comply with various state regulations. They vary considerably in engine size and weight. They are often versions of off-road bikes that have been made legal for street riding.

Terms such as dual-purpose, trailbike, on/off-road, scrambler, adventure/ADV and adventure touring are marketing descriptions, chosen by the manufacturer. Enduro bikes are more likely to be competition oriented in the US, while an enduro bike in Europe is considered street legal. These are not strict definitions and not necessarily based upon the size, weight, and intended usage. Typically the dual-sport category focuses on lower weight to make them more comfortable and capable off-road, while adventure bikes are heavier to make them more comfortable and capable on the pavement.

== Evolution of dual-sports ==
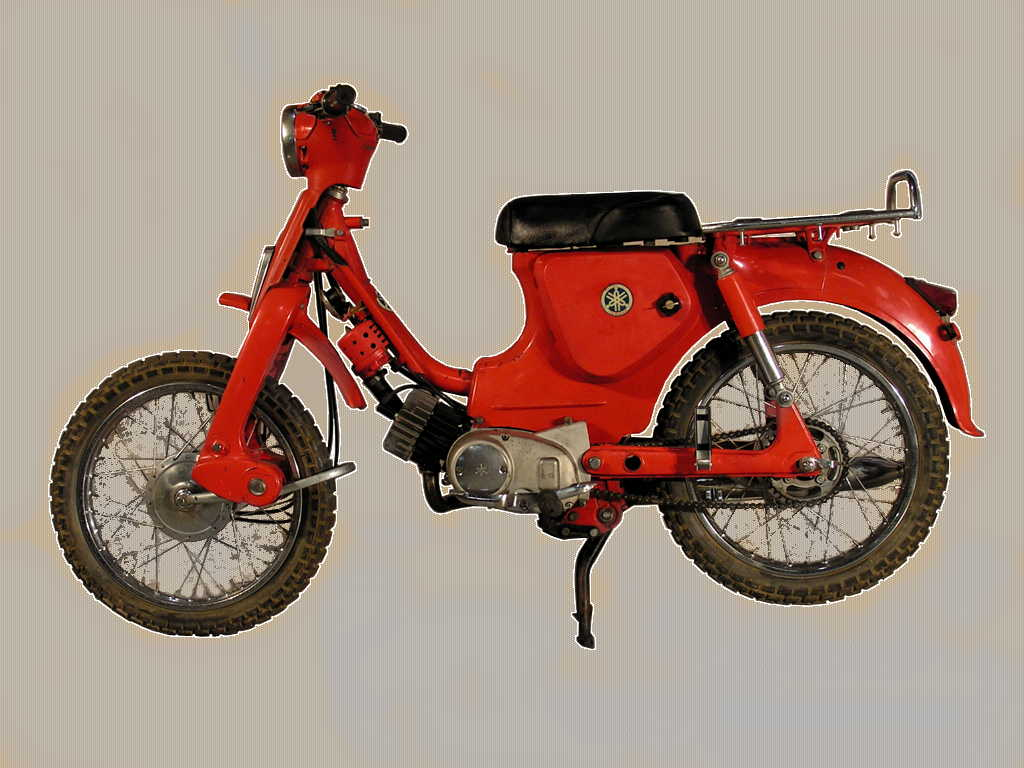
1963 Yamaha MJ2T Trailmaster. One of the original street legal trailbikes.

The concept of a versatile motorcycle equally at home on dirt and pavement is as old as motorcycling itself. Most roads around 1900 were still unpaved when motorized bicycles first appeared. In a sense, all motorcycles at that time were dual-sports, intended to be used on dirt as well as pavement. Advertisements well into the 1920s depict motorcycles on dirt roads, raising clouds of dust. By 1940, most roads in developed countries were paved and motorcycles had become heavier and more oriented to the street. In the 1950s and 1960s British manufacturers such as Triumph and BSA offered versions of their street motorcycles with high exhaust pipes, and called them scramblers.

In the early 1960's things began to change. Big twin cylinder scramblers were on their way out in favor of nimble, lightweight "trailbikes". Herb Uhl of Boise, ID began modifying the step-through framed 50cc Honda Super Cub, a move Honda adopted as the Trail 50. Yamaha followed with their own step-through, the electric start, 55cc MJ2T Trailmaster. Then came the bike (Motorcycle Hall of Famer) Joe Parkhurst called the phenomenal "dual-purpose" bike, the Hodaka Ace 90. It can be argued that over 150,000 Hodakas sold in the US qualify it as the first dual-sport motorcycle.

Even though Hodaka was first, Yamaha is credited with popularizing dirt worthy motorcycles that could also be ridden on the street. In 1968 they introduced the hugely successful DT-1 based on a 250cc two-stroke engine. In 1969 Suzuki followed with the two-stroke, TS250 Savage, with other manufacturers following with similar models called "enduros". Honda focused on four-strokes and followed their SL100/SL125 with the XL250 in 1972. These light weight machines were good on trails and adequate on pavement. Some manufacturers approached the trend from the opposite direction, beginning with a street motorcycle and modifying it for adequate off-road performance. For instance, the Honda CL350 Scrambler was a variation on the Honda CB350 street motorcycle with high exhaust pipes, a larger front wheel, dirt-oriented tires, and lower gearing. As a partial response to Yamaha's success with the DT-1, in 1969 Honda produced the SL350 K0. Considered Honda's first real production Dual Sport, the SL350 still borrowed heavily from the CB350 platform. By 1971, the Honda SL350 K1 and the later K2 had been completely transformed from a heavy, unyielding, unpredictable, unequipped off-roader into a nimble, user friendly, trail champion. This line of dual sports continued to evolve into the popular XL series of Honda Dual Sports.

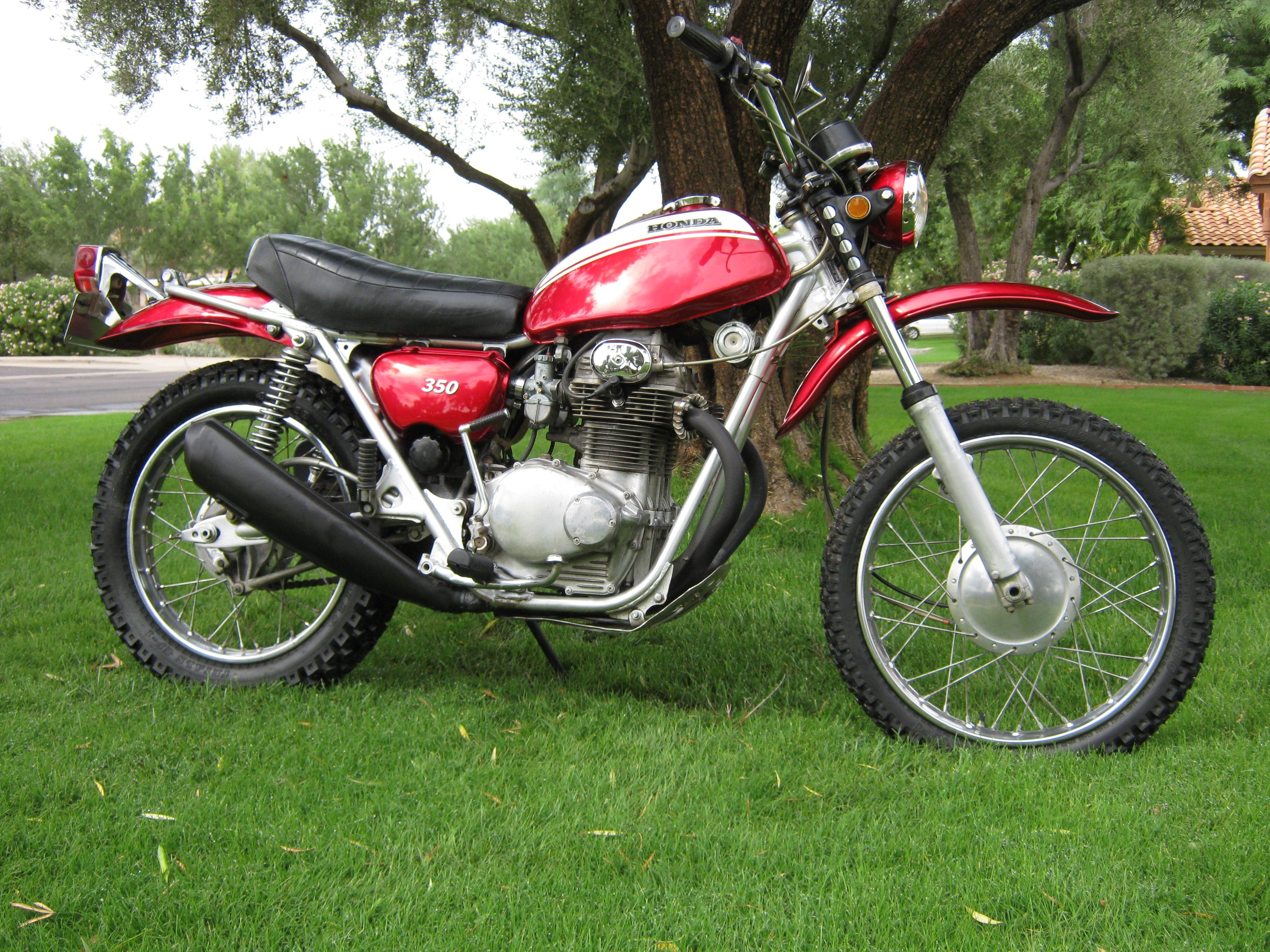
Honda 71-SL350 "Scrambler"

BMW helped evolve the category with the introduction of the 797.5cc R80 G/S in 1980, the first large adventure dual sport machine and the ancestor of the adventure bike category. Modified versions of the R80 G/S won the gruelling Paris-Dakar Rally four times in five years from 1981 and 1985, and Helge Pedersen rode one for 10 years over 250,000 miles/400,000 km in an around-the-world journey that helped cement the G/S's place in motorcycling history. Suzuki introduced the DR350 in 1990 and promoted it as a DualSport or “dirt bike with a license plate." The terms "dual-sport" and “dualie” were quickly adopted by riders and the motorcycle press.

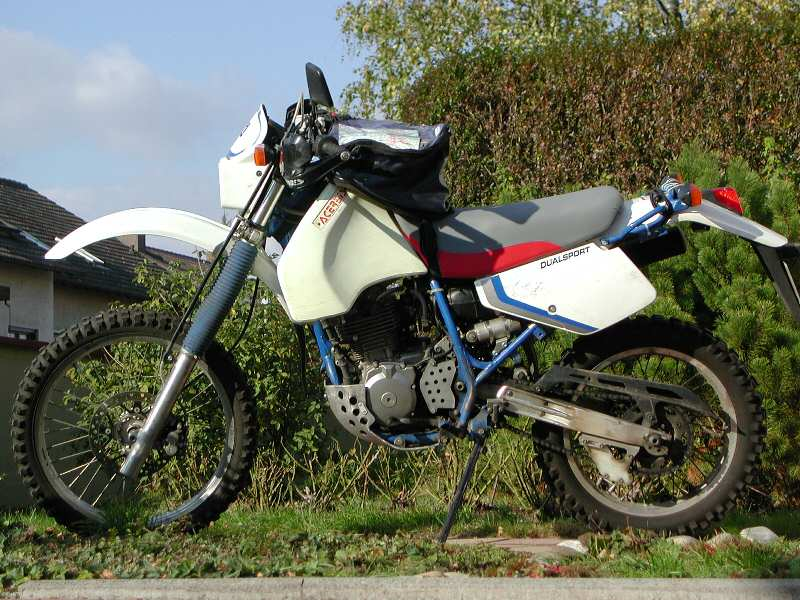
The Suzuki DR350 helped popularize dual-sport motorcycles.

Over the next 20 years, many manufacturers began producing enduros based on four-stroke engines as they searched for better combinations of weight, power, durability, performance and comfort. The heavier machines were typically better on longer highway rides but less popular with “real” dirt riders, who often modified them by removing components to create lighter and more competent trail machines. Yamaha's "Trailway" TW200 arrived in 1987 and is still offered as of 2026. Most likely it is America's #1 dual-sport of all time due to its long term availability. Other long running dual-sport Hall of Famers include the 1987 Kawasaki KLR650 an 80% street / 20% dirt "adventure" bike and the virtually unchanged 1993 Honda XR650L both of which are still available as of 2026.

21st century dual-sports have increased in sophistication beginning with the Suzuki DR-Z400. Liquid cooling became standard along with high performance engines and electric starters. Government regulations limited some manufacturers from producing dual-sports based on "real" dirt bikes while companies like Huasberg, Husqvarna, KTM and Beta invested considerable effort in bringing fuel-injected European bikes into the US with DOT and EPA emissions certifications. Some notable cutting edge dirt bikes with DOT certs are the discontinued Husqvarna TE510, the KTM 500 EXC and Beta RS models.

== Types of dual-sports ==
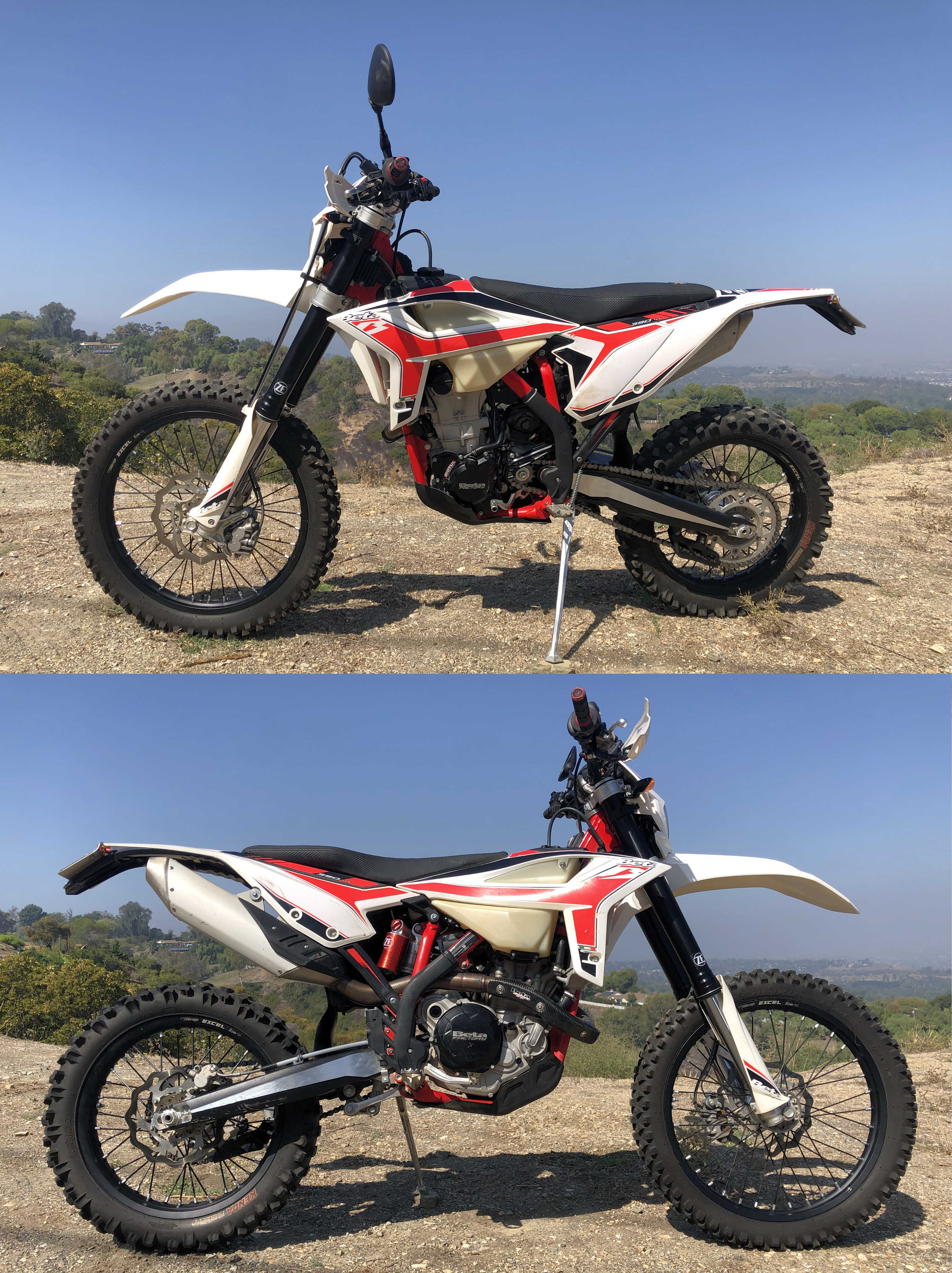
Lightweight dual-sport Beta 390 RR-S w/ custom mods

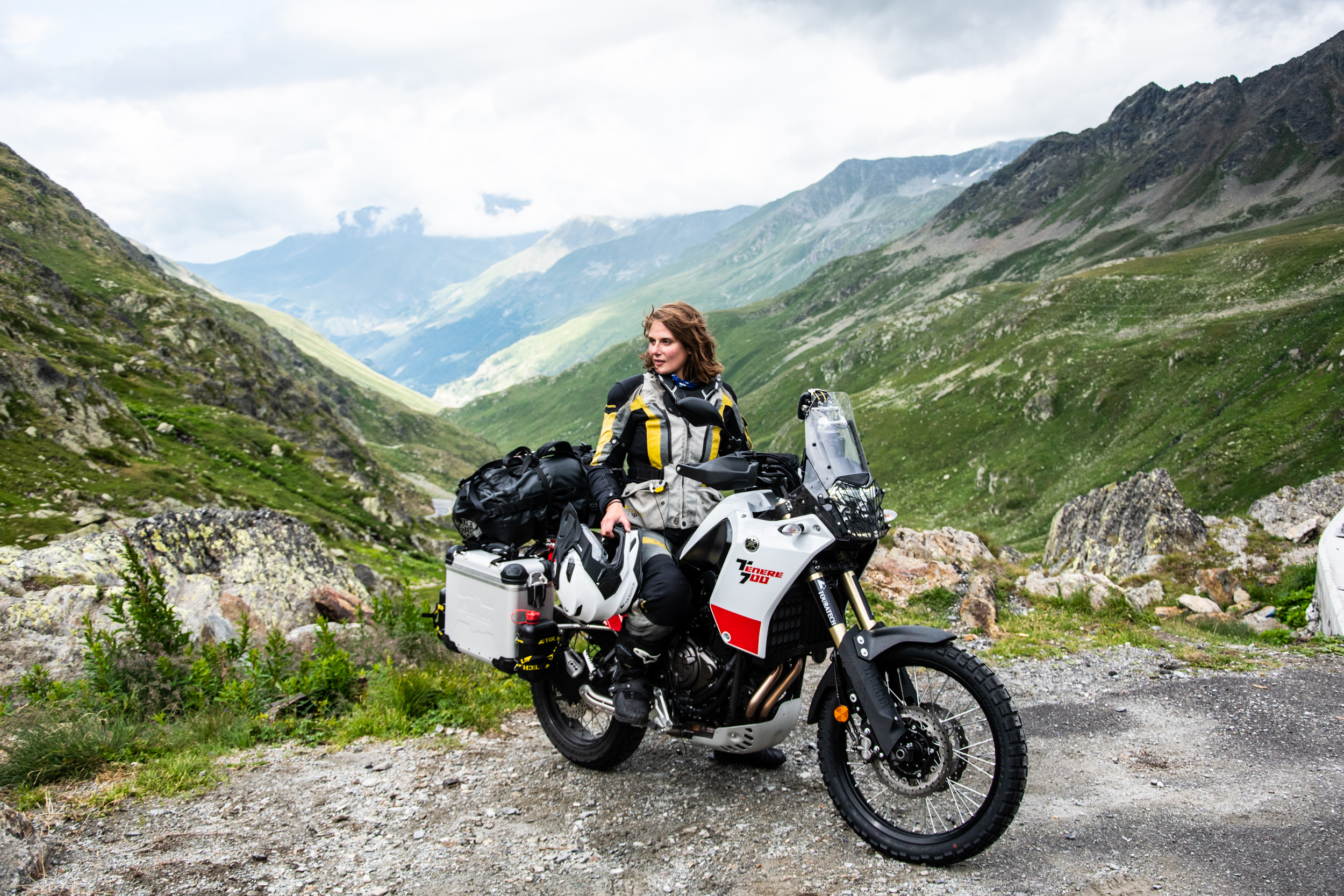
Heavyweight dual-sport Yamaha Ténéré 700

Manufacturers use several different names for their dual-sport models. Suzuki uses DualSport to describe its products. Kawasaki describes its offerings as dual purpose, Honda lists its entry under off-road, and other manufacturers describe machines as enduros, or simply list them as model numbers. A few models are described as "adventure bikes". Despite these differences in terminology, these models can be described as dual-sports, which are street-legal motorcycles that can be operated on pavement, dirt roads and trails. Dual-sport motorcycles are the most practical choice in rural areas in many parts of the world, and when traveling on unpaved trails they can often be a necessity.

There are four ways of creating dual-sports. Some manufacturers add street-legal equipment to existing off-road motorcycles. These bikes are usually light and powerful, at the expense of shorter service life and higher maintenance. This approach is currently taken by European manufacturers such as KTM, Husqvarna and Beta. Other manufacturers start with a clean sheet of paper and design a new model designed for a specific combination of dirt and street use. These motorcycles are usually heavier and more durable than the models derived from off-road motorcycles. This approach is currently taken by Aprilia, BMW, Honda, Kawasaki, Moto Guzzi, Suzuki, and Yamaha. Several manufacturers modify street motorcycles to make them more dirt worthy. Finally, owners add street-legal equipment to off-road bikes. In the US, some states license only motorcycles that met highway emissions requirements when first sold, while others allow off-road vehicles to be converted to on-road.

Generally a dual sport is less than 400 pounds (180 kg) while bikes above 400 pounds (180 kg) are considered adventure bikes. For example, the lightest dual-sport offered by Suzuki Motor Corporation in 2008 weighs about 250 pounds (110 kg) and has a small single-cylinder engine with barely enough power for highway use. The heaviest dual-sport offered by Suzuki Motor Corporation in 2008 weighs about 460 pounds (210 kg) and has a large two-cylinder engine with plenty of power for long freeway trips.

Dual-sports may be grouped by weight and intended purpose.

- Lightweight dual-sports weigh about 250 to 300 lb (110 to 140 kg). They have high fenders and ground clearance plus long travel suspension, and usually come with aggressive dirt oriented tires known as “knobbies”. Lightweights are closest to pure dirt bikes and are most at home on rough trails and two-track roads with occasional forays onto pavement.
- Middleweight dual-sports weigh about 300 to 400 lb (140 to 180 kg). They usually have less suspension travel and ground clearance than lightweights, and often come with tires that offer a compromise between dirt and pavement performance. Middleweights are most at home on smooth trails, graded dirt roads and pavement.
- Heavyweight dual-sports weigh over 400 lb (180 kg). These motorcycles are also called adventure (ADV) or adventure touring bikes by some manufacturers. They are designed primarily for riders who want to travel long distances on pavement with occasional forays onto dirt roads. They usually come with smoother tires that perform better on pavement. Motorcycles of this type are increasingly favored by a subset of touring riders who never intend to ride off-pavement, as they tend to offer comfortable riding positions, reasonable range, and the ability to carry luggage, while weighing less and performing more nimbly than a traditional touring bike.

These types are only approximate and new models that split the boundaries and offer different combinations of features appear each year. However, the laws of momentum and inertia always favor lighter dual-sports for tight, rough trails. Heavier dual-sports that emphasize rider comfort, wind protection and the capacity to carry luggage are better choices for long highway trips at higher speeds.

Dual-sports, by definition, are compromises — giving up some dirt performance to be ridden on the street and some street performance to be ridden in the dirt. The merits of a particular model can only be judged relative to the owner's intended mix of dirt and street riding. Although aficionados may argue the merits of different models, versatile dual-sports can be desirable alternatives to more specialized motorcycles that can only be ridden in one environment.

== Accessories ==
It is common for dual sport owners to customise their bike to match the type of terrain or roads on which they ride. Changing tires, handlebars, seats, bash plates or foot pegs are common modifications. Adding large petrol tanks, racks, luggage and wind screens are common for riders intending to travel far. Dual sport aftermarket parts and accessories are manufactured and available worldwide.

== Related motorcycles ==
Adventure motorcycles (ADV) When dual-sports are fitted for long-distance travel with accessories such as oversized gas tanks, luggage, and other distance-oriented gear, they are often referred to as "adventure bikes". These motorcycles offer touring capabilities, but are less comfortable on long pavement trips than full-fledged touring motorcycles such as the Honda Goldwing series.

Enduro Enduro bikes are typically competition oriented in the US, while an enduro bike in Europe is considered street legal.

Supermoto (also known as a supermotard or motard) is typically a converted motocross bike with less suspension travel, smaller front and rear wheels (typically 17"), road tires and an oversized front brake designed to be primarily run on pavement. When made street legal, these bikes may also be considered to be a type of dual-sport. In this case, these motorbikes could be seen as somewhere between a sport bike and a dual-sport.

== See also ==
- Outline of motorcycles and motorcycling
