= Nigusil =

Nigusil is a patented metal alloy created by Moto Guzzi for motorcycle cylinder liners. The name is a portmanteau of Nickel-Guzzi-Silicon.

Moto Guzzi, having successfully created the first engine with a chromed cylinder lining, continued research to find a material that could replace chrome. The research culminated with Nigusil, a nickel-silicon alloy applied to the cylinder through special procedures. This innovation allowed lower friction coefficient in the engine, significantly lower levels of mechanical parts wear, and considerable savings of lubricant. Treatment of cylinders through Nigusil was also used by many manufacturers, Maserati among them, and generally on racing engines.

Nigusil was introduced in 1979 on the 350 cc V35, then the V50 and 850T4. It was also used on the higher performance 850 cc 850 Le Mans II model. From engine 80390 (in Europe) in mid-1980, the Nigusil-plated bores introduced with the second series of the II engine allowed the use of lighter pistons and rings with closer tolerances. These ran cooler than the earlier engine, giving more consistent tolerances and reducing the engine's previously high oil consumption. Nigusil is often confused with Nikasil and some texts use the term interchangeably.
