= Moto Guzzi 750 Strada =

Shaft drive motorcycle

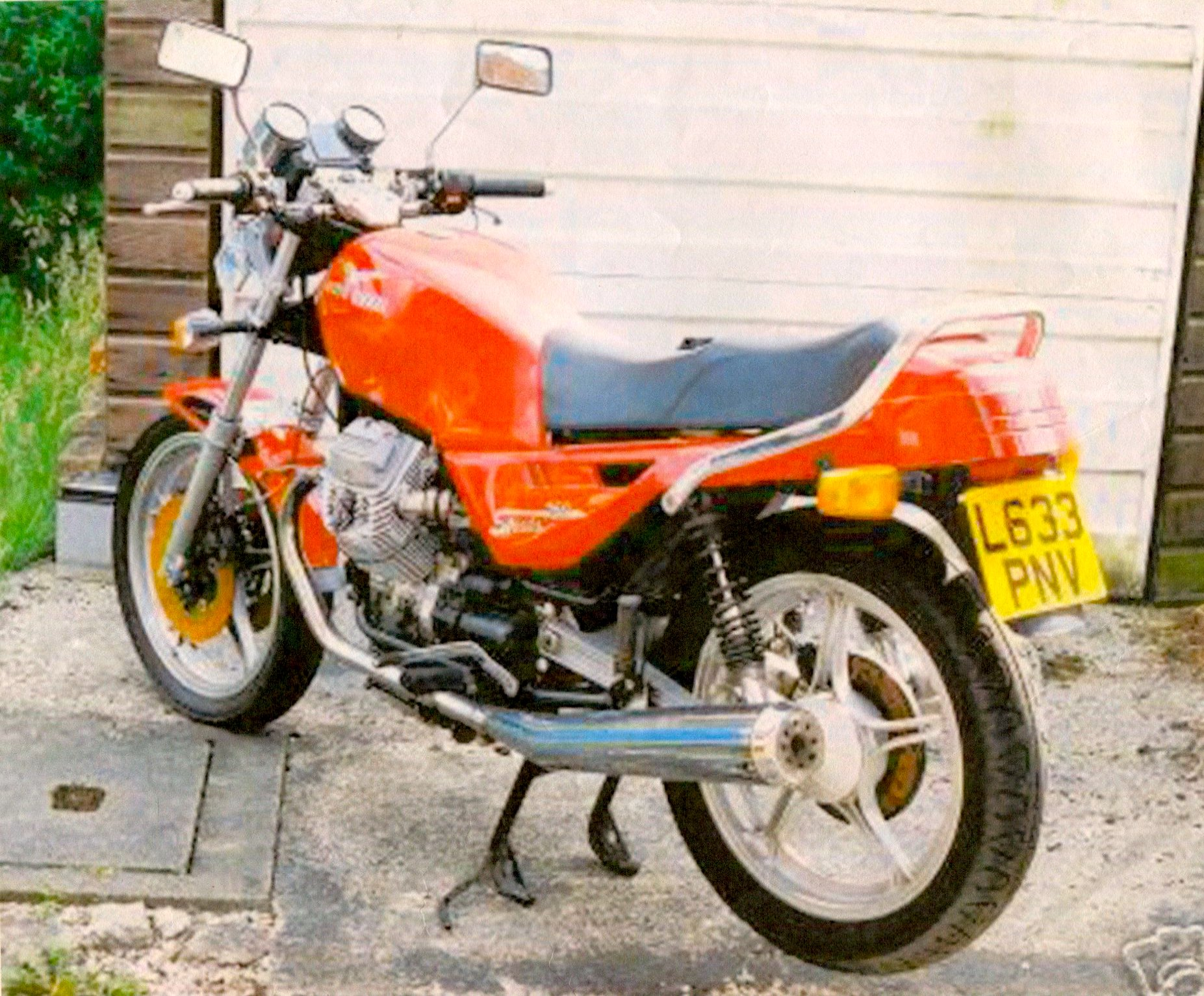
- Manufacturer: Moto Guzzi
- Production: 1992–1994
- Predecessor: Moto Guzzi 350 & 500
- Successor: Moto Guzzi 1000 Strada
- Engine: Longitudinally mounted 743 cc (45.3 cu in) OHV 2-valve per cyl. air cooled, four-stroke, V-twin, wet sump, electric start, crank-mounted alternator
- Transmission: 5 speed, shaft drive
- Suspension: Front: telescopic forks Rear: twin shocks adjustable for preload
- Brakes: Front: twin disc brakes Rear: single disc (linked to one of the front discs)
- Tires: Tubeless, on alloy spoked wheels
- Seat height: 28.7 in (730 mm)
- Weight: 408 lb (185 kg) (dry)
- Fuel capacity: 4.23 US gal (16.0 L; 3.52 imp gal)

The Moto Guzzi 750 Strada is a 743 cc standard motorcycle first manufactured in 1992 by Italian company Moto Guzzi. Based on the Moto Guzzi 350 roadster, the 750 Strada was lighter than the V7 Sport, but much less powerful.

Following the established Moto Guzzi pattern of a transverse V-twin engine and shaft drive, the 750 Strada used an enlarged version of the lightweight 1990s Guzzi 350/500 engine.

The 750 Strada was an easy-to-ride motorcycle, suitable as a first "big bike" whose 48 bhp output was never intimidating, giving a top speed of around 95 mph. (The earlier, heavier V7 produced some 70 bhp). The innovative linked-braking system (where the foot pedal operated the rear brake and just one of the front discs) was safe and effective. Suspension was conventional, with telescopic forks at the front, and twin shocks at the rear. The final shaft drive is reliable, requiring little maintenance and allowing a rear end free of chain-oil spatter. The side-to-side torque reaction of the longitudinal crankshaft is barely noticeable. The seat height was even lower than on the V7, making it accessible to women riders.

== Reception ==
The 750 Strada was a motorcycle that never really caught the imagination of buyers, as the power output was too low for some bikers, while the smaller and cheaper 350 and 500 Moto Guzzi models served the purposes of riders seeking a runabout. The 750 Strada was a "naked" bike, affording the rider no wind protection, and it was less reliable than some Moto Guzzis, the electrics being prone to suffer in damp conditions. Production was discontinued after only some 2 years.

== Moto Guzzi 1000 Strada ==
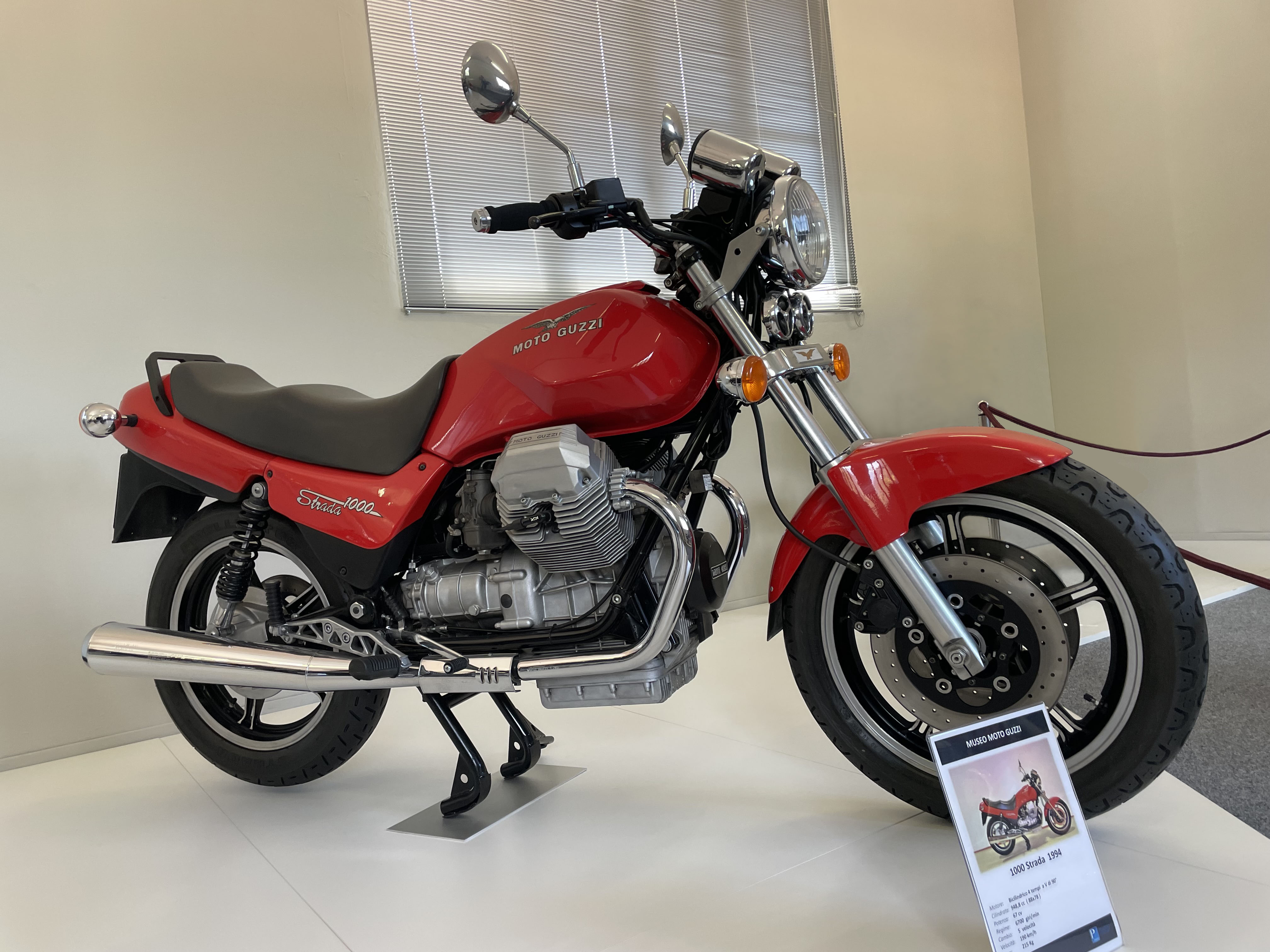
Moto Guzzi 1000 Strada

A stablemate of the 750 Strada was the 1000 Strada, which differed primarily in the engine's greater cubic capacity.

== See also ==
- Moto Guzzi V7 Sport
