= Nikasil =

Nickel-silicon alloy

Nikasil is a trademarked electrodeposited lipophilic nickel matrix silicon carbide coating for engine components, mainly piston engine cylinder liners.

== Development ==
Nikasil was introduced by Mahle in 1967 and was initially developed to allow Wankel engine apex seals to work directly against the aluminum block. This coating allowed aluminum cylinders and pistons to work directly against each other with low wear and friction. Unlike other methods, including cast iron cylinder liners, Nikasil allowed very large cylinder bores with tight tolerances. This made it possible for existing engine designs to be expanded easily. The aluminum cylinders also gave a much better heat conductivity and lower friction than cast iron liners, an important attribute for a high-output engine. The coating was further developed as a replacement for hard-chrome plated cylinder bores for Mercury Marine Racing, and Kohler Engines, and as a repair replacement for factory-chromed snowmobiles, dirt bikes, ATVs, watercraft, and automotive V8 liners/bores.

Nikasil is short for nickel silicon carbide. Silicon carbide is a very hard ceramic (much harder than steel). To form Nikasil, small particles of silicon carbide are suspended in a solution of nickel; the nickel is electroplated onto a cylinder bore. As the nickel is deposited (by the electroplating), the nickel incorporates the particles of silicon carbide.

After the cylinders are plated, the Nikasil bores are diamond-honed to a plateau finish. Pistons will need to be fitted with Nikasil compatible piston rings as chrome rings commonly used with cast iron bores are not compatible. Due to Nikasil's hardness, the resulting cylinder bores are usually long-lived with less cylinder wear than other types of cylinders. As Nikasil is extremely durable, cylinders do not need to be reworked as often as would an iron or chrome cylinder, usually only requiring deglazing before re-ringing. However, if there is damage to the plating, the cylinder must be stripped before it can be bored and re-plated.

== Applications ==
Porsche started using Nikasil on the 1970 917 race car, and later on the 1973 911 RS. Porsche also used it on production cars, but for a short time switched to Alusil due to cost savings for their base 911. Nikasil cylinders were always used for the 911 Turbo and RS models. Nikasil coated aluminium cylinders allowed Porsche to build air-cooled engines that had the highest specific output of any engine of their time.

Nikasil was very popular in the 1990s. It was used by companies such as BMW, Ducati, Jaguar and Moto Guzzi in their new engine families. However, the sulfur found in much of the world's low-quality gasoline caused some Nikasil cylinders to break down over time, causing costly engine failures. Porsche engines suffered from many issues caused by high sulfur content fuels.

Nikasil or similar coatings under other trademarks are also still widely used in racing engines, including those used in Formula One and ChampCar. Suzuki uses a nickel phosphorus-silicon-carbide proprietary coating trademarked SCEM (Suzuki Composite Electro-chemical Material) to maximize cylinder size and improve heat dissipation in the TU250X, Hayabusa, Honda NX250 Enduro and other motorcycles.
Radio-control glow-plug nitro engines commonly use a Nikasil coated sleeved cylinder and an aluminium alloy piston without any compression rings.

== See also ==
- Nigusil
- Alusil
