= Moto Guzzi Le Mans =

Moto Guzzi 850 Le Mans
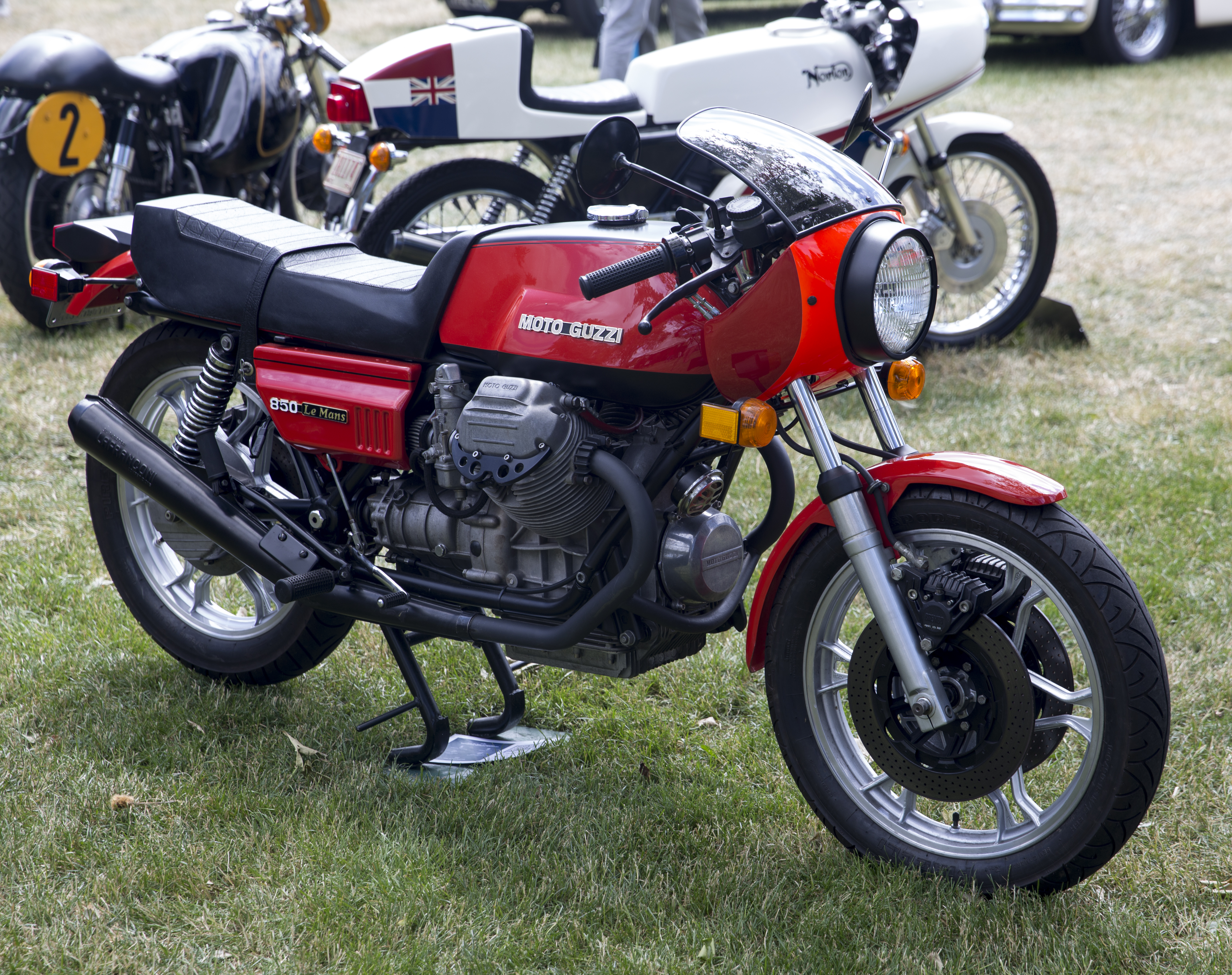
- Le Mans Series 1
- Manufacturer: Moto Guzzi
- Production: 1976–1992
- Predecessor: 750 S3
- Successor: Moto Guzzi 1100 Sport
- Engine: 844 cc (51.5 cu in) OHV 2-valve per cyl. air cooled, four-stroke, V-twin, longitudinally mounted
- Bore / stroke: 83 mm × 78 mm (3.3 in × 3.1 in)
- Transmission: 5-speed manual, shaft drive
- Suspension: Front: telescopic fork Rear: twin shocks, adjustable for preload
- Brakes: Front: 2 x 300 mm (12 in) discs Rear: Single 242 mm (9.5 in) disc
- Tires: Front: 4.10-18; Rear: 4.25-18
- Wheelbase: 1,473 mm (58.0 in)
- Seat height: 775 mm (30.5 in)
- Fuel capacity: 22.5 L (4.9 imp gal; 5.9 US gal)

The Moto Guzzi Le Mans is a sports motorcycle first manufactured in 1976 by Italian company Moto Guzzi. It was named after the 24-hour motorcycle endurance race at Le Mans in France. The Le Mans designation was first used for an 850 prototype, based on the V7, displayed at Premio Varrone in late 1972.

The original 850 Le Mans was a café racer with clip-on handlebars and a bikini nose fairing, but in the face of more and more powerful bikes from other manufacturers later models were developed more as sports tourers with a three-quarter fairing. A marketing success, the Le Mans competed against Italian superbikes from Ducati and Laverda. The original Le Mans was continually developed and spawned several later models, a final versions appearing in the early 1990s.

== Design ==
The basic design of the Le Mans remained essentially the same throughout the production run:

=== Engine ===
The engine developed from the earlier Moto Guzzi 750s is an aircooled 90 degree OHV V-Twin was at the time an already proven Moto Guzzi design that had been in production in various forms since the late 1960s. Like previous models the engine is mounted longitudinally in the chassis (Crankshaft inline with the wheels) presenting the air cooled cylinders to direct uninterrupted airflow and allowing a direct powertrain to the rear wheel. The V-twin configuration gives improved ground clearance over an opposed 'Boxer' layout, allowing the engine to mounted low in the chassis. The single camshaft mounted in the crux of the V operates the 2 valves (per cylinders) via pushrods and is driven by a short double row camchain. The camchain mounted on the front of the engine also drives the oil pump for wet sump lubrication.

=== Transmission ===
The 5 speed gearbox is directly bolted to the rear of the engine and does not share oil with the engine. The gearbox is driven from the dry multiplate clutch with two friction plates. The Output shaft drives the double row universal joint and drive to the rear wheel is via a crown and pinion bevel box with its own oil supply.

=== Chassis ===
Like the engine the chassis was developed from the Moto Guzzi 750s. Designed by Lino Tonti for the Moto Guzzi V7 Sport, the substantial chassis was made from straight tubing, highly triangulated and was praised at the time for its excellent handing.

== 850 Le Mans ==
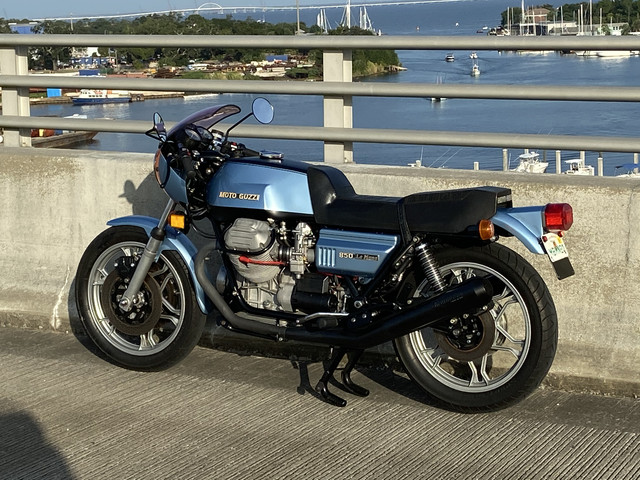
Moto Guzzi 850 Le Mans

The 850 Le Mans 850, (retrospectively unofficially called the Le Mans I), was first shown at the Milan motorcycle show in November 1975, and sales began in 1976. Like the 750S and the 750 S3, the Le Mans 850 was developed from the 53 hp (39 kW) V7 Sport model of 1971, but power was increased to 71 hp (52 kW). Top speed is 130 mph (209 km/h). Compared to its roadster sibling, the T3, the Le Mans had higher-compression domed pistons, larger engine valves, and Dell'Orto 36 mm pumper carbs with filterless velocity stacks. Now commonly called the 'Mid Valve' engine, Moto Guzzi claimed 73 hp (54 kW) at 7700 rpm.

The Le Mans had three production runs with very slight modifications:

The first run, Series A, had a round CEV taillight, low 'racer' seat that was unusually a made of a single molded foam item, silver fork legs and various minor detail changes and continued in production until at least September 1976. Although it is often stated that fewer than 2,000 of these were made, Ian Falloon claims 219 were made in 1975 and a further 2,532 in 1976 although it is possible some of these were Series B bikes built at the end of the year.

The Series B run totaled some 4,000 (2,548 in 1977, 1,737 in 1978). Falloon gives total 850 Le Mans production as 7,036. Series B bikes and had these modifications: a De Tomaso-designed rectangular taillight with a modified rear mudguard, black fork sliders, small heel-plates, cast fuel taps and a more generous dual seat.

Series C bikes gained ridges on the heel-plates. Most bikes were red and black, but a few were metallic blue (Ice Blue), and even fewer were white.

Le Mans bikes exported to the United States had yellow side reflectors on CEV indicators, and a sealed-beam headlight as the OEM Aprilia headlight did not meet Department of Transportation approval. These US sealed-beam units protruded in an ungainly way, spoiling the profile of the bike.

The bike was not without its faults, the single piece seat quickly cracked and broke. Many cycle parts including the upswept exhaust were flat black and paint was not up to the task, the bikes quickly gained a reputation for rusting of the black painted components.

Reviews in the motorcycle press where mixed. Most reviewers disliked the molded seat and switchgear but praised the willing engine and handling. The high gearing gave a relaxed cruising speed and made deceptive progress. In 1977 Cycle Magazine said "the only shaft drive motorcycle to handle really well when ridden hard". The model went on to be an iconic model for Moto Guzzi and the quintessential sporting Moto Guzzi.

== 850 Le Mans II ==
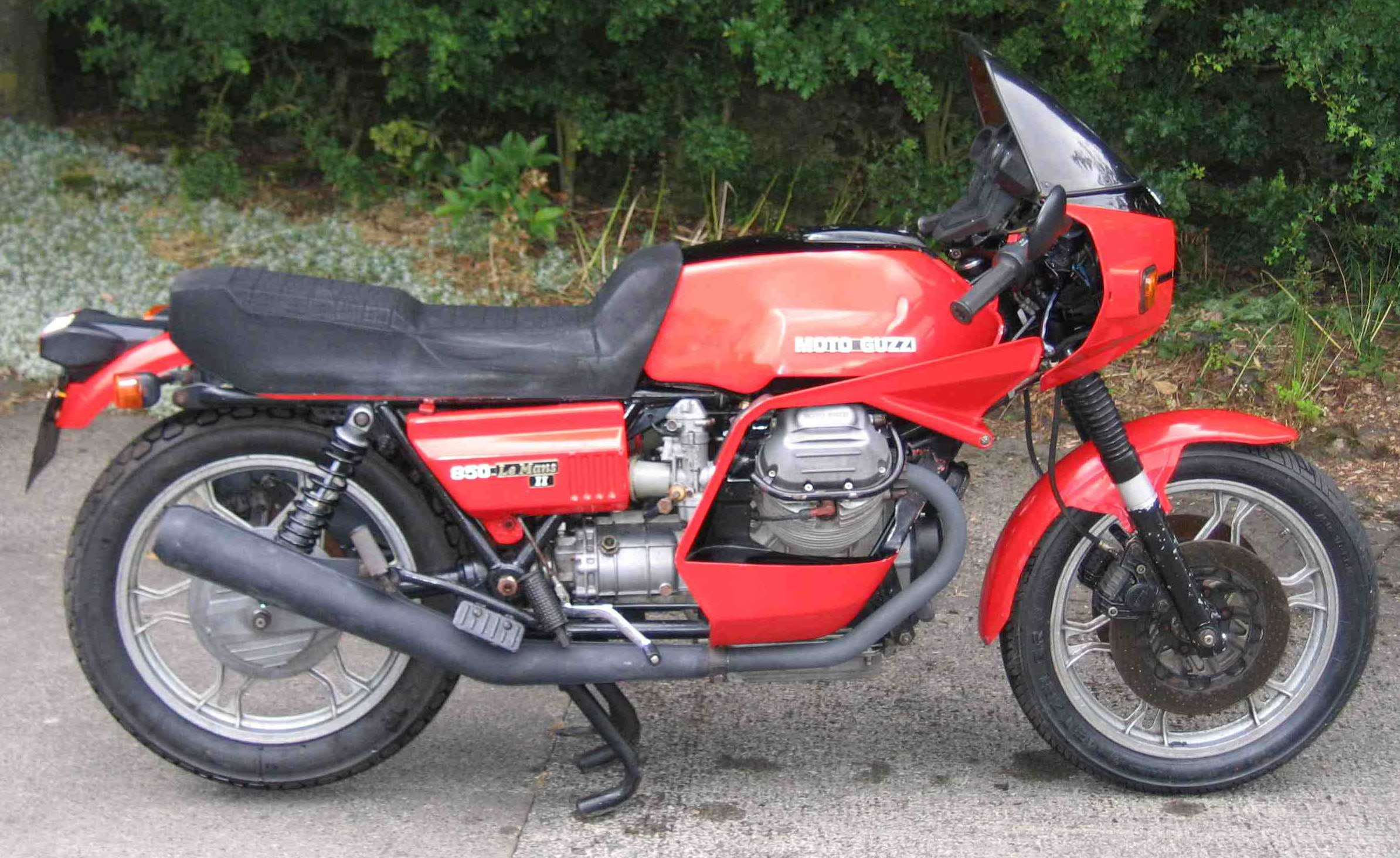

The Le Mans II was similar to the Le Mans I, but the small 'bikini" fairing became a larger full fairing, in three parts, incorporating indicators. The fairing had been tested in Moto Guzzi's wind tunnel (which had been used to test race bike fairings in the 1950s). The new fairing had a rectangular headlight, rather than the earlier round item. later bikes saw an oil sump spacer to increase internal volume and move the oil away from the crankshaft and cylinder bores were updated to alloy coated with Moto Guzzi's patented "Nigusil".

The front fork was slightly changed and now held slightly wider in the yokes (triple trees). The seat was the same as the Le Mans and could comfortably carry a pillion. Further changes included a revised instrument cluster derived from the 1000cc SP. Brakes were linked, with the handlebar lever operating the front right caliper and the footbrake operating both the front left and rear caliper via a simple splitter.

=== CX 100 ===
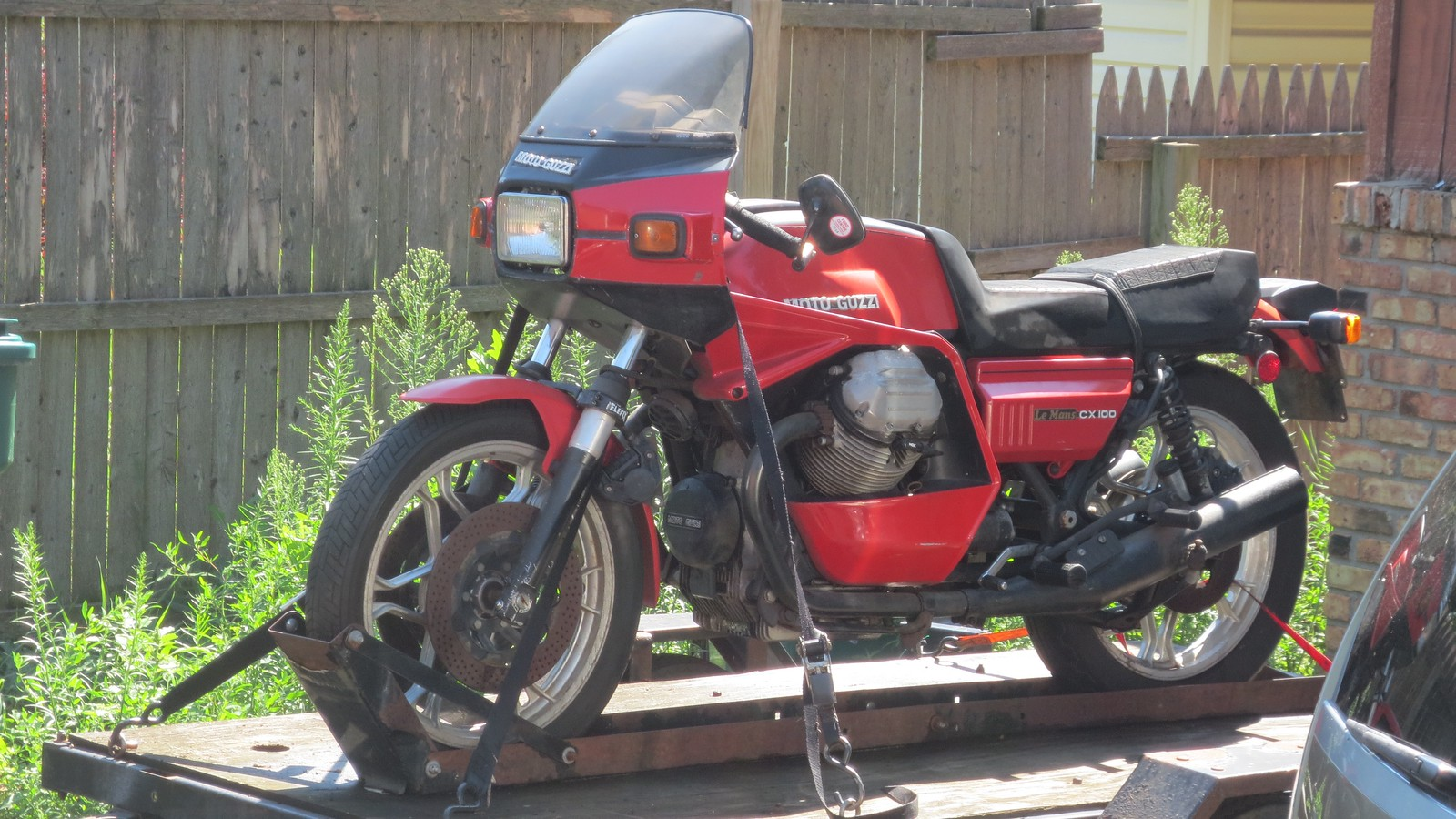
Moto Guzzi CX100

For the US market whose importer had always wanted a larger displacement machine than the 850 Le Mans II. The mid valve 850 engine was replaced with the engine from the 1000 SP1000 to make the CX 100. Outwardly similar to the 850 Le Mans II, despite the larger capacity of the touring engine, it produced less power, but with stronger bottom and mid range power making for an arguably more 'usable' street machine. The Le Mans II was not available in the US.

== 850 Le Mans III ==
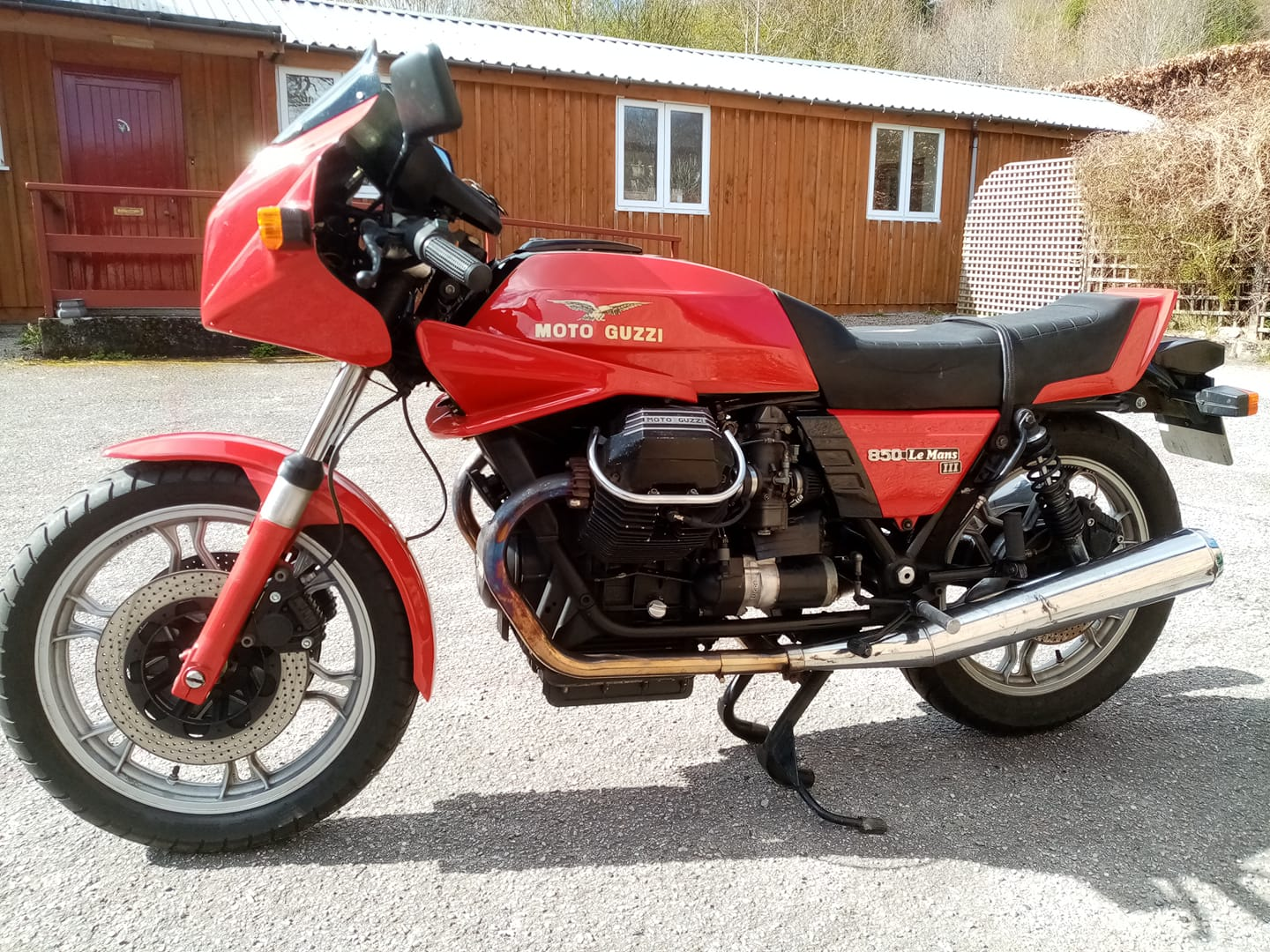
Moto Guzzi Le Mans III

In 1981 a major redesign saw the tank, seat, fairings updated, which now resembled the V50 Monza and V35 Imola models. The instrument cluster was now dominated by a large white faced Veglia tachometer inside a moulded rubber binnacle. An extensive technical re-design saw many changes from the Le Mans II. The engine saw considerable updates with revised cylinder head and barrels, with a squared-off cooling-fin design. A sump spacer was now standard, deepening the oil sump and moving the pickup further from the spinning crank. The engine crankcase breather was integrated into the top frame tube. The pushrods and cylinder studs were moved further from the bore centre, allowing for future increases in cylinder capacity. The engine had improved machining tolerances, revised intake, carburation and exhaust systems all of which gave an increase in power and torque despite the (official) slight drop in compression ratio.

Minor changes were made to the rear suspension, with a longer swing arm; the front forks were 35mm, with 20mm more travel, though narrower, returning to the 180mm of the Le Mans I. Front and rear dampers were air-adjustable. A true proportioning valve was fitted to the linked brakes, improving the braking performance and later models had revised cast wheels although still with tube type tyres.

The Le Mans III was well received by the press; the model sold well by Moto Guzzi standards; and it is held by some to be the best Le Mans model. A total of 9,866 where built between 1981 and 1985. They were available in red, white and metallic grey. In 1993 Steve Attwood rode a Le Mans III to victory in the US Iron Butt Rally covering 12,458 miles (20,049 km) in 11 days.

== Le Mans 1000 ==
=== Le Mans 1000 IV and V ===
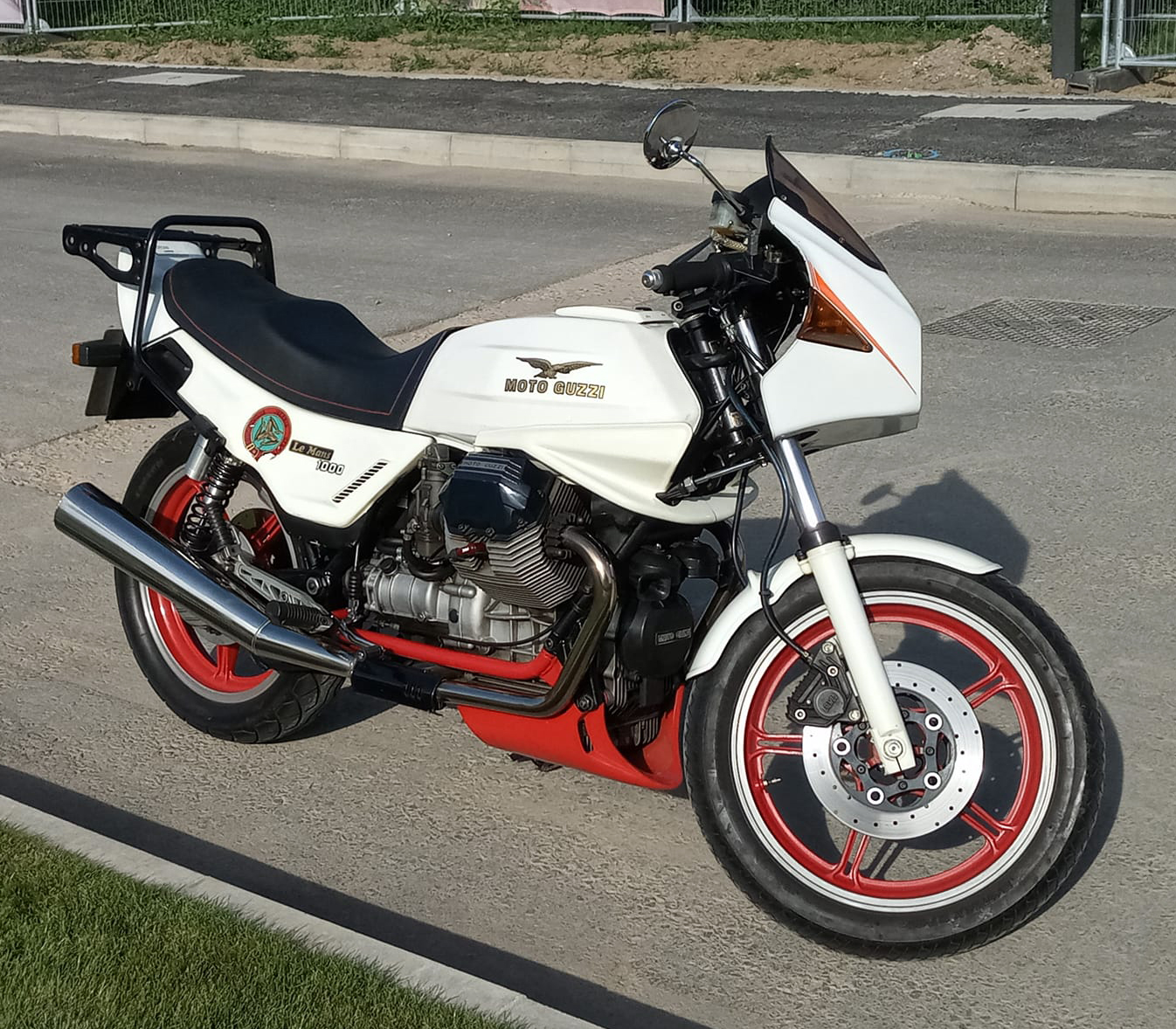
Moto Guzzi Le Mans IV (note the 18-inch front wheel)

The Le Mans 1000 appeared at the end of 1984 and continued with minor modifications until 1992. The two main production runs were known as Series 1 and Series 2 but more commonly called the Le Mans IV and Le Mans V. The Le Mans 1000 had an increased engine capacity of 949 cc, bigger valves and compression ratio of 10.2:1, with uprated 40 mm pumper carbs and the B10 camshaft from the original Le Mans race kit. Commonly known as the 'Big Valve' engine, Moto Guzzi claimed 81 hp (59.1 kW) @ 7400 rpm.

For the Series 1 De Tomaso himself decreed a 16-inch front wheel and new Lario styling for the Le Mans 1000; both were initially unpopular with Guzzi traditionalists and the press reviewers. Instead of redesigning the frame to incorporate a smaller front wheel, for the first year of production Guzzi simply fitted the smaller wheel into the existing frame, which was designed for the 18-inch wheel. The wheels themselves were of a new design, the rear was up a size to 3.5 inch, able to take tubeless tyres and a longer swinging arm gave a lengthened wheelbase. Complaints about the 16-inch front wheel were answered by the following years 1985/86 versions, which had modified flatter topped steering yokes (triple trees) which reduced the trail and were made in steel rather than alloy. Later a still longer front fork was used to keep the original geometry. A longer and stiffer fork with 40 mm stanchions was fitted, but the smaller 16-inch wheel necessitated fitting the smaller 270mm front disks, but were now semi-floating.

The new bike was now physically longer, higher and larger than the 850cc predecessors but had improved ergonomics and increased performance thanks to the more powerful engine.

An 18-inch front wheel option became available in 1987. The bikes included uprated Bitubo dampers and updated geometry. When the 18-inch front wheel were fitted, the longer fork for the 16-inch wheel now protruded through the yokes (triple trees). By 1988 most models were factory fitted with the 18-inch front wheel. A total of 4230 Le Mans IV's were made.

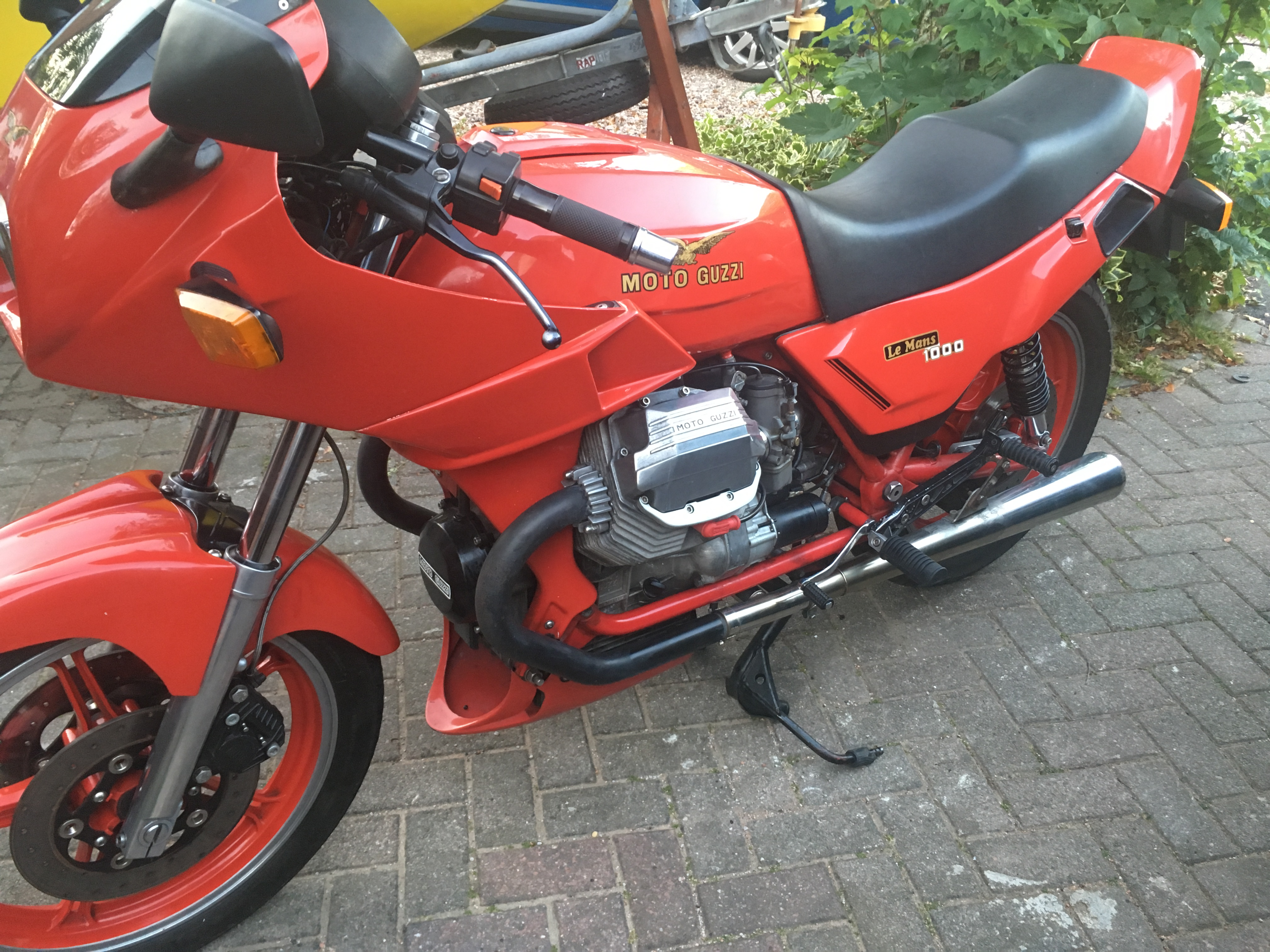
Moto Guzzi Le Mans V

In 1988 the Series 2 also known as the Le Mans MK V, again had some minor changes. Gone for good was the disliked, but since improved 16-inch front wheel, in favor of the 18-inch. Like many manufactures the 16-inch wheels had fallen from fashion, although the smaller 270mm front disks of the smaller front wheel remained. The angular Lario styled handlebar fairing was replaced by a more rounded sleek subframe mounted fairing with external indicators. A total of 2113 Le Mans MK V's were made.

=== Le Mans 1000 SE (Special Edition) ===
Released to commemorate the 20th anniversary of the V7's appearance the 1000 SE was sold in late 1986, 1987, and also into 1988 for those in the US market. (Only 100 SE models were sold in the US.) All 1000 SE bikes were red and white, with a red seat, red cast wheels, black rocker covers, engine and lower rails, engines and transmissions. The gearing was closer and higher than the standard 1000.

=== Le Mans 1000 CI ===
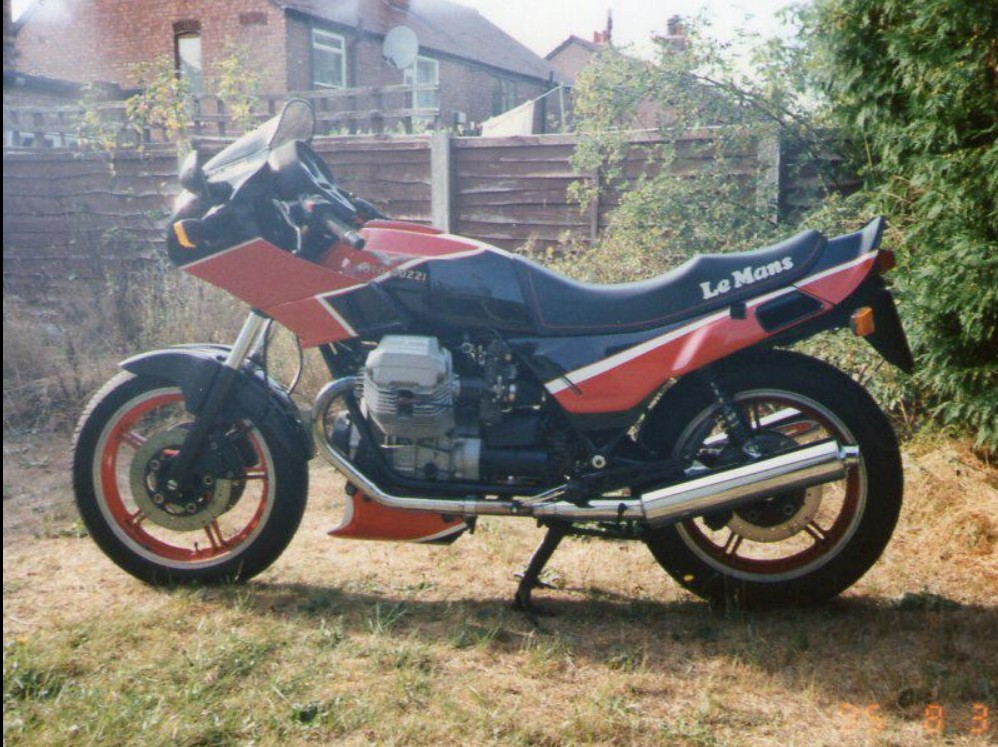
Moto guzzi Le Mans 1000 Mk V NT

The 1000 CI included some updates of the previous version and included a range of new two color paint schemes. The Series 3 is commonly called the Le Mans 1000 V NT (new type) and was to be the final incarnation of the standard production line of Le Mans models. Near the end of production the half fairing was updated so it contained a dashboard mounted instruments rather than rubber binnacle upon the top yoke.

=== Ultima Edizione ===
By 1990 it was clear that the 'Big Valve' engine would soon fail to make the required emission standards, as the oversized valves and heavily domed piston where long obsolete. 1992 saw the very last of the Le Mans models with the Ultima Edizone. These models numbered 1 to 100 came with a certificate and marked the end of the model's 17 year production run.

The basic chassis, running gear and engine very briefly lived on in the retro styled Moto Guzzi 1000s, imitating the style of the original 750S, the precursor to the original 850 Le Mans.

== Land Speed Records ==
In 1999 a Series Le Mans Mk V took two land speed records in Nevada desert US.: the first, ridden by Todd Ross, was the 1000cc Production- Production Pushrod (P-PP) record at 134.441 mph for pushrod production motorcycles under 1000cc. The second, ridden by Mitch Freshour, was the 1000cc Special Construction Partial Streamliner-Pushrod Gas (APS-PG) at 142.271 mph.

== Racing ==
In 1973 the Le Mans factory prototype finished 4th in the 24-hour race at Barcelona's Montjuïc circuit.

In 1977 Roy Armstrong won Britain's Avon Production Machine championship on a standard bike fitted with production race kit.

In 1984 Dr John Wittner campaigned and won on a Le Mans III in the AMA/CCS US Endurance Series Championships.

In 1985 Dr John Wittner again returned with a Le Mans 1000 to win the AMA/CCS US Endurance Series Championships in the Heavyweight Modified Class.

== Preserved examples ==
Examples of all the Le Mans models are preserved in the Moto Guzzi Museum.
