= Moto Guzzi V7 Sport =

Shaft drive motorcycle

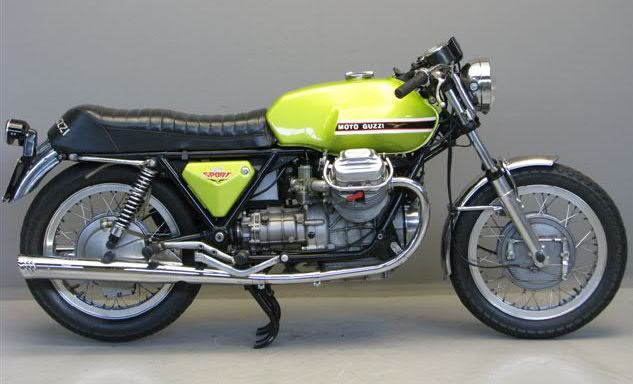
- Manufacturer: Moto Guzzi
- Production: 1971–1974
- Predecessor: V7 roadster
- Successor: 750S, Le Mans
- Engine: Longitudinally mounted 748 cc (45.6 cu in) OHV 2-valve per cyl. air cooled, four-stroke, V-twin, 9.8:1 compression ratio, two 30 mm Dell'Orto carbs each with cold-start levers, wet sump, electric start, crank-mounted alternator
- Bore / stroke: 82.5 mm × 70.0 mm (3.25 in × 2.76 in)
- Transmission: 5 speed, shaft drive
- Suspension: Front: telescopic forks Rear: twin shocks adjustable for preload
- Brakes: Front: 220 mm (8.7 in) double-sided with twin leading shoes per side drum Rear: 220 mm (8.7 in) twin leading shoe drum
- Tires: Front: 3.25-18 with WM2 aluminium rim Rear: 3.50-18 with WM3 aluminium rim
- Wheelbase: 58 in (1,500 mm)
- Dimensions: L: 85 in (2,200 mm); W: 28 in (710 mm)
- Seat height: 30 in (760 mm)
- Weight: 454 lb (206 kg) (dry)
- Fuel capacity: 4.4 US gal (17 L; 3.7 imp gal)
- Oil capacity: 6 Imperial pints (approx 3.3 litres)

The Moto Guzzi V7 Sport is a sports motorcycle first manufactured in 1971 by Italian company Moto Guzzi. Based on the V7 roadster, but with a new frame and clip-on handlebars, the V7 Sport was the first Moto Guzzi café racer. The V7 Sport was lighter than the standard V7, it handled well and proved popular.

The V7 Sport formed the basis for subsequent models and ultimately led to the very successful Le Mans.

In 2008, Moto Guzzi introduced the "V7 Special", a detuned retro-styled roadster loosely based on the V7 Sport. The "Special" was itself succeeded in 2012 by a more powerful 50 bhp model.

== Reception ==
Motorcycle Mechanics' editor Charles Deane commented in his 1972 road-test that the V7 Sport, with a factory-claimed 70 bhp power output, was like a "BMW with a little bit extra" – a bit more acceleration, higher top speed and better braking, but was also, significantly, the most expensive "Superbike" available in Britain.

The reviewer added: "The brakes were 'faultless' – powerful and progressive but did not prove fierce, inspiring 'confidence' in wet conditions, and the 'remarkably-low' seat height enabled a 'short' 5' 6" rider to place both feet on the floor but would be 'cramped' for a taller rider".
