= Moto Guzzi V1000 Convert =

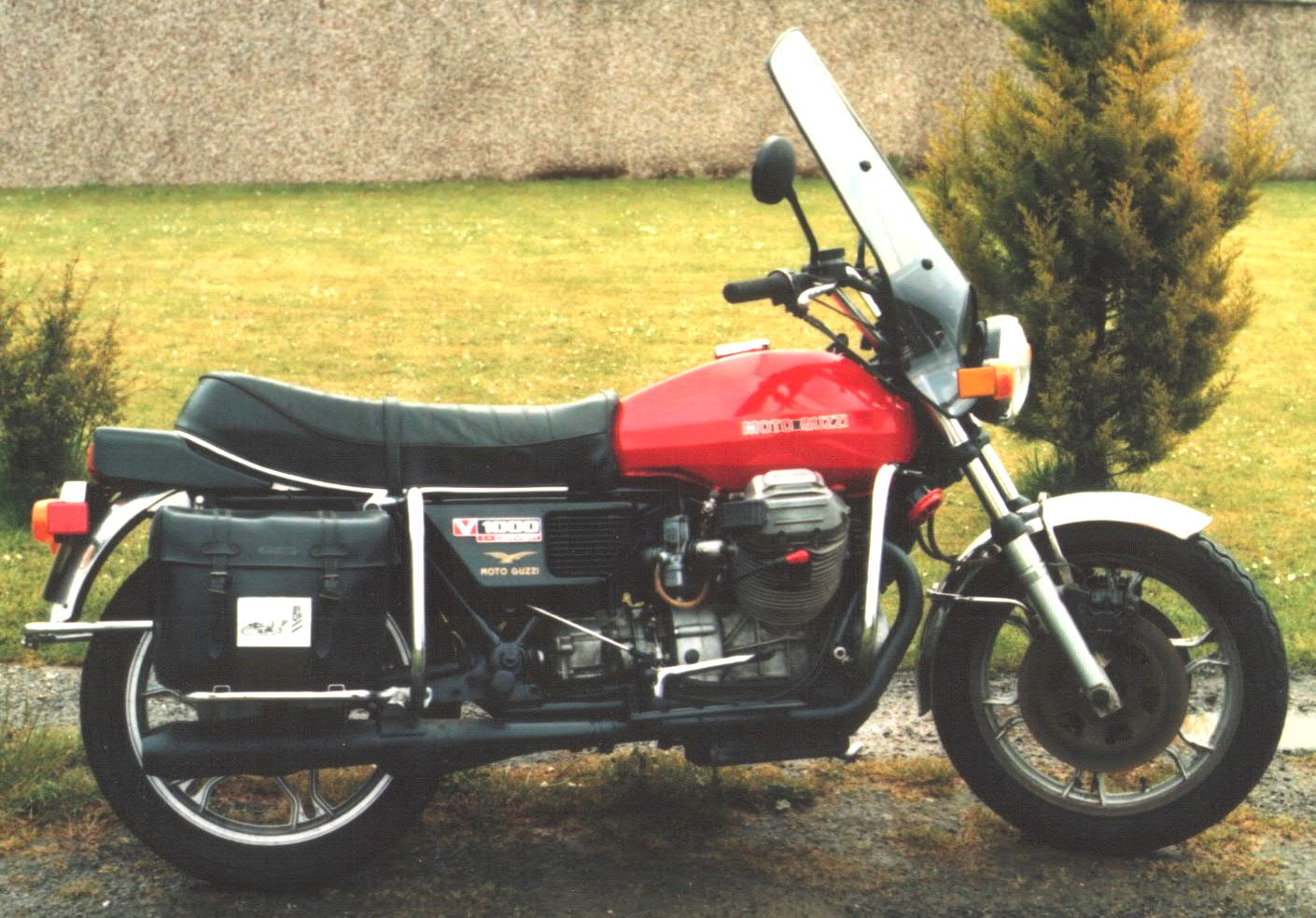
- Manufacturer: Moto Guzzi
- Production: 1975–1982
- Class: Standard
- Engine: 949 cc (57.9 cu in) OHV air-cooled 90° V-twin
- Top speed: 110 mph (180 km/h)
- Power: 71 hp (53 kW) @ 6,500 rpm
- Transmission: Shaft drive from automatic 2 speed gearbox
- Brakes: Front: 2x disc, Rear: disc, pedal linked to one front disc
- Weight: 255 kg (562 lb) (dry)
- Fuel consumption: 35 mpg_{‑US} (6.7 L/100 km; 42 mpg_{‑imp}) to 45 mpg_{‑US} (5.2 L/100 km; 54 mpg_{‑imp})

The Moto Guzzi V1000 Convert was a motorcycle made by Moto Guzzi at Mandello del Lario, Italy. The designers at Moto Guzzi were aiming the V1000 Convert at the US police motorcycle market and were the first to produce a big capacity automatic motorcycle with shaft drive.

Moto Guzzi increased the pushrod-operated V-twin's bore and stroke to give a displacement of 949 cc (57.9 cu in), and replaced manual gearbox with a torque converter built by Sachs, and two-speed gearbox.

The "Convert" name referred to the torque converter which fed engine power to a conventional clutch. The clutch had to be used to shift between two speeds but the torque converter enabled the bike to stop in either gear and accelerate smoothly without using the clutch.

== Links ==
Media related to Moto Guzzi V1000 I-Convert at Wikimedia Commons
