= Moto Guzzi =

Italian motorcycle manufacturer

Coordinates: 45.9153669°N 9.32041°E

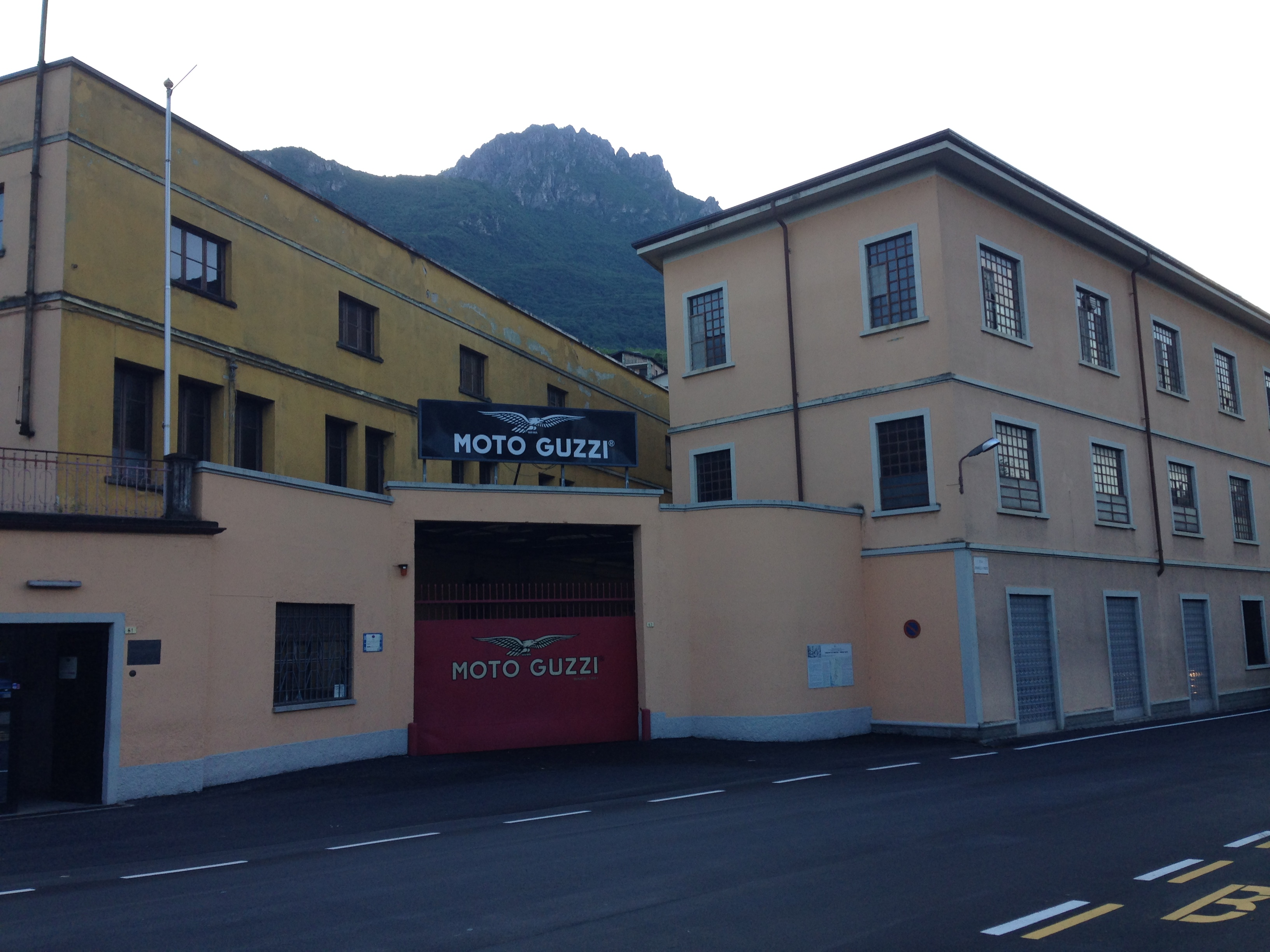
- Type: Subsidiary
- Industry: Motorcycle manufacturing; Motorcycle distribution; Engine manufacturing
- Founded: 15 March 1921; 105 years ago as Società Anonima Moto Guzzi, Genoa, Italy
- Founder: Carlo Guzzi Giorgio Parodi Angelo Parodi
- Headquarters: Via Parodi 57, Mandello del Lario, Italy
- Area served: Worldwide
- Key people: Roberto Colaninno, CEO
- Products: Motorcycles; Engines
- Parent: Piaggio Group
- Website: www.motoguzzi.com

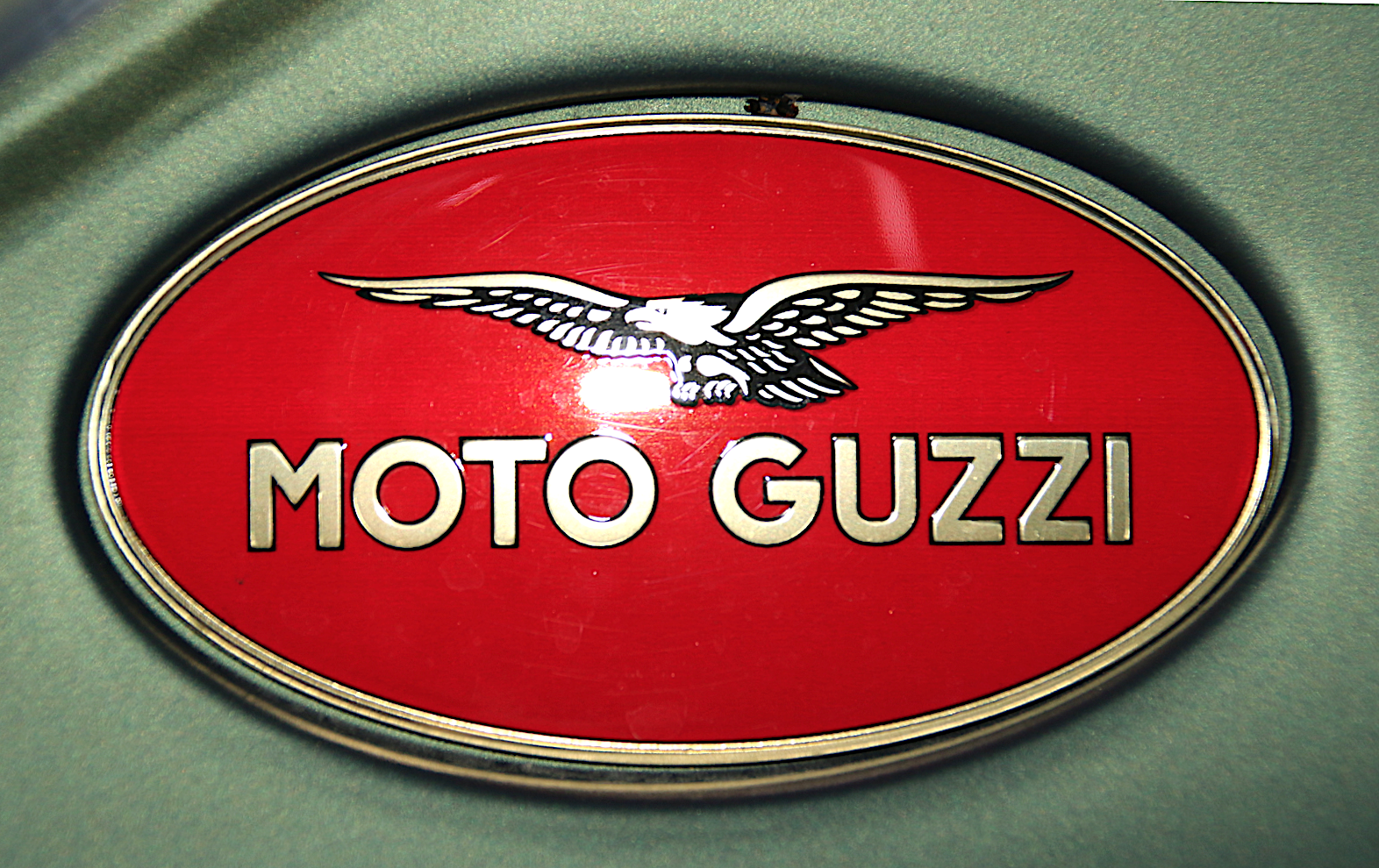
Moto Guzzi emblem

Moto Guzzi (Italian pronunciation: [ˈmɔːto ˈɡuttsi]) is an Italian motorcycle manufacturer and the oldest European manufacturer in continuous motorcycle production.

Established in 1921 in Mandello del Lario, Italy, the company is noted for its historic role in Italy's motorcycling manufacture, its prominence worldwide in motorcycle racing, and industry innovations—including the first motorcycle centre stand, wind tunnel and eight-cylinder engine.

Since 2004, Moto Guzzi has been an unico azionista, a wholly owned subsidiary, and one of seven brands owned by Piaggio Group, Europe's largest motorcycle manufacturer and the world's fourth largest motorcycle manufacturer by unit sales.

The company's motorcycles are noted for their air-cooled 90° V-twin engines with a longitudinal crankshaft orientation where the engines' transverse cylinder heads project prominently on either side of the motorcycle.

== History ==
Similar to other storied motorcycle manufacturers that have survived for decades, Moto Guzzi has experienced a series of business cycles and a series of ownership arrangements—some complex, some brief, some that have endured.

=== 1921–1966: Origins ===
Moto Guzzi was conceived by two aircraft pilots and their mechanic serving in the Corpo Aeronautico Militare (the Italian Air Corp, CAM) during World War I: Giorgio Parodi, Giovanni Ravelli and Carlo Guzzi. Assigned to the same Miraglia Squadron based outside Venice, the three became close, despite coming from different socio-economic backgrounds. They envisaged creating a motorcycle company after the war. Parodi (the son of wealthy Genovese ship-owners) would finance the venture, Ravelli (already a famous pilot and motorcycle racer) would promote the bikes with his racing prowess and Guzzi would engineer the motorcycles. Ravelli died just days after the war's end in an aircraft crash and is commemorated by the eagle's wings that form the Moto Guzzi logo.

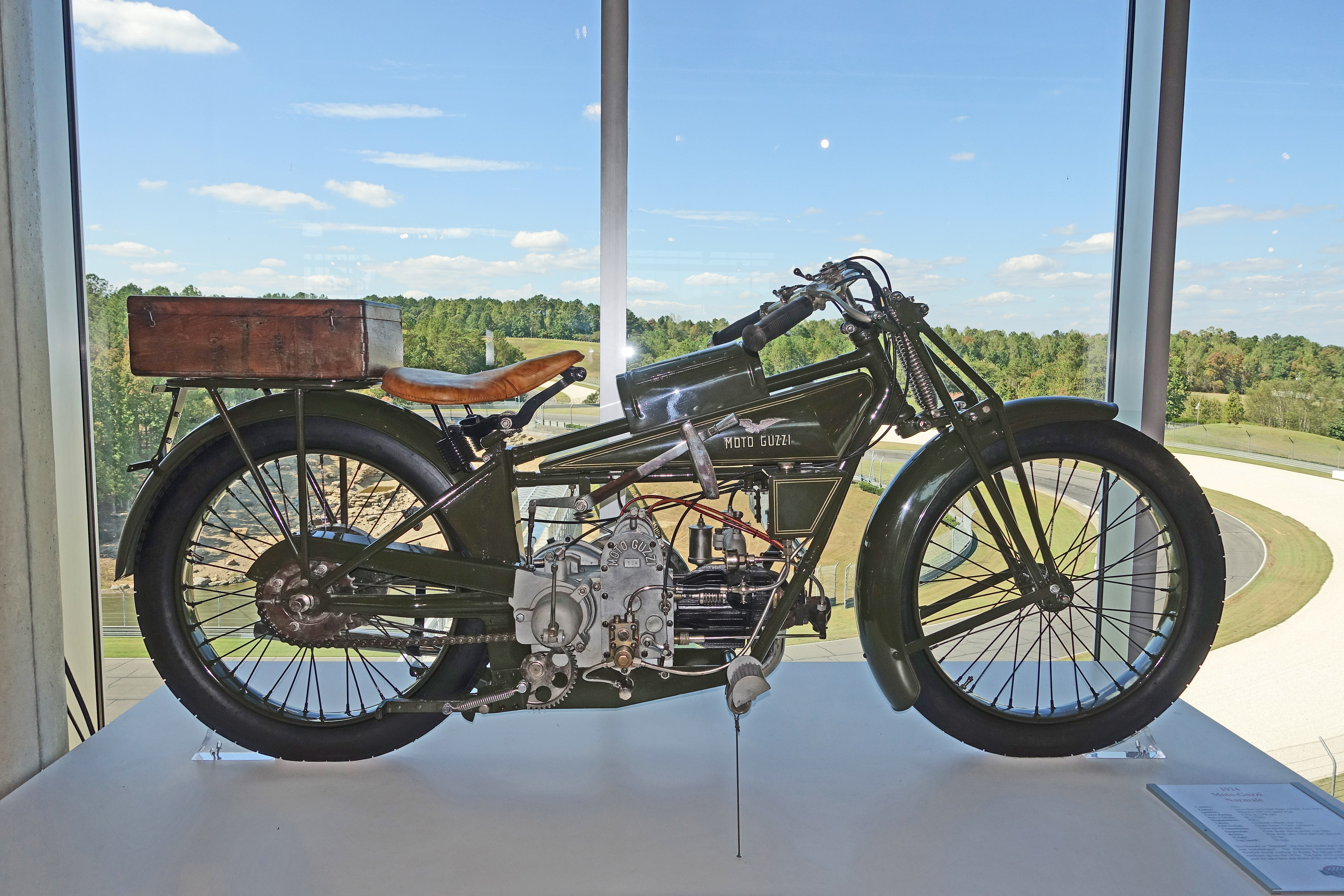
1924 Moto Guzzi Normale on display at the Barber Vintage Motorsports Museum, Birmingham, Alabama. The single-cylinder motorcycle had a displacement of 498cc, weighed 285 pounds, and had a top speed of 50 mph.

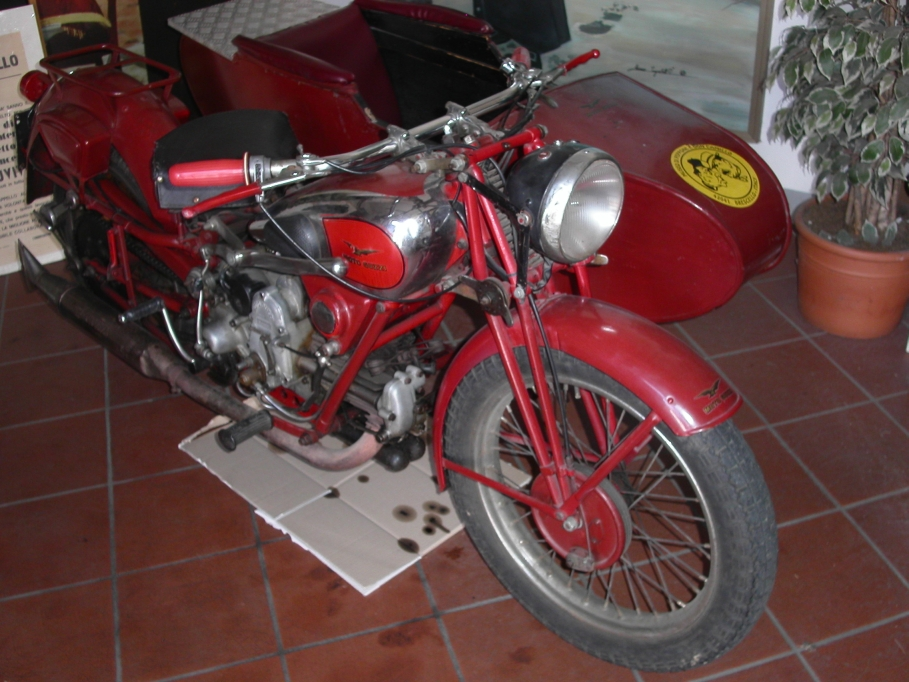
Moto Guzzi, Museum of Brescello

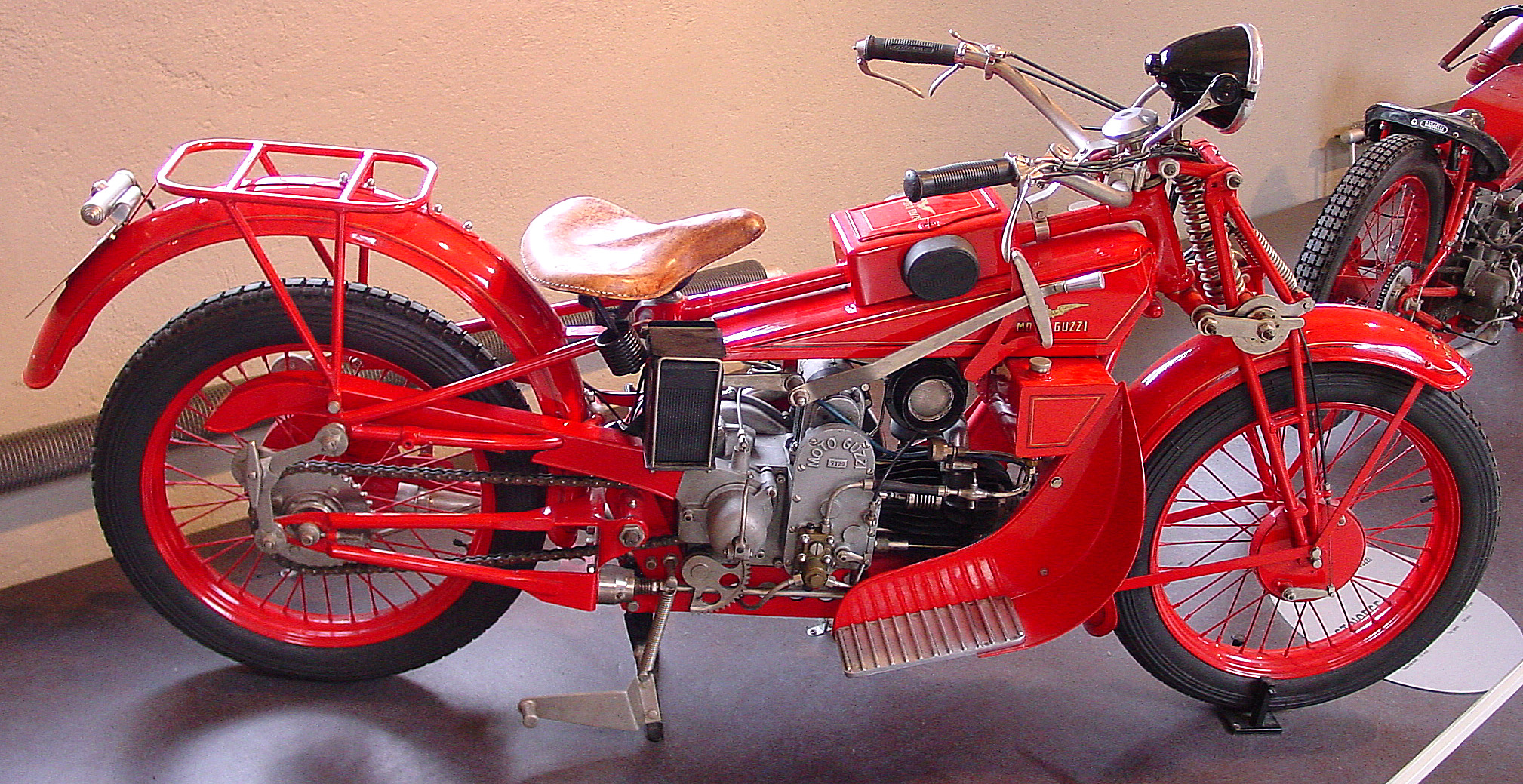
The GT Norge, Moto Guzzi Museum, Mandello del Lario, driven 4,000 miles (6,400 km) to the Arctic Circle in 1928

Giorgio Parodi, his brother Angelo, and Carlo Guzzi created a privately held silent partnership "Società Anonima Moto Guzzi" on 15 March 1921, for the purpose of (according to the original articles of incorporation) "the manufacture and the sale of motor cycles and any other activity in relation to or connected to metallurgical and mechanical industry".

The company was legally based in Genoa, Italy, with its headquarters in Mandello. The very earliest motorcycles bore the name G.P. (Guzzi-Parodi), though the marque quickly changed to Moto Guzzi. As the only shareholders, the Parodis wanted to shield their shipping fortunes by avoiding confusion of the name G.P. with Giorgio Parodi's initials. Carlo Guzzi initially received royalties for each motorcycle produced, holding no ownership in the company that bore his name. In 1946 Moto Guzzi formally incorporated as Moto Guzzi S.p.A. with Giorgio Parodi as chairman.

Carlo Guzzi's first engine design was a horizontal single-cylinder engine that dominated the first 45 years of the company's history in various configurations. Through 1934, each engine bore the signature of the mechanic who built it. As originally envisioned, the company used racing to promote the brand. In the 1935 Isle of Man TT, Moto Guzzi factory rider Stanley Woods scored an impressive double victory with wins in the Lightweight TT as well as the Senior TT.

Until the mid-1940s, the traditional horizontal four-stroke single-cylinder 500 cc engines were fitted with one overhead and one side valve but contrary to the usual practice of having inlet over exhaust (IOE), this employed the side valve for induction and the overhead valve for exhaust. Also unusual was the adoption of only one hairspring (type of valve spring) to close the exhaust valve. These were the highest performance engines Moto Guzzi sold to the general public. By contrast, the company supplied the official racing team and private racers with higher performance racing machines with varying overhead cam, multi-valve configurations and cylinder designs.

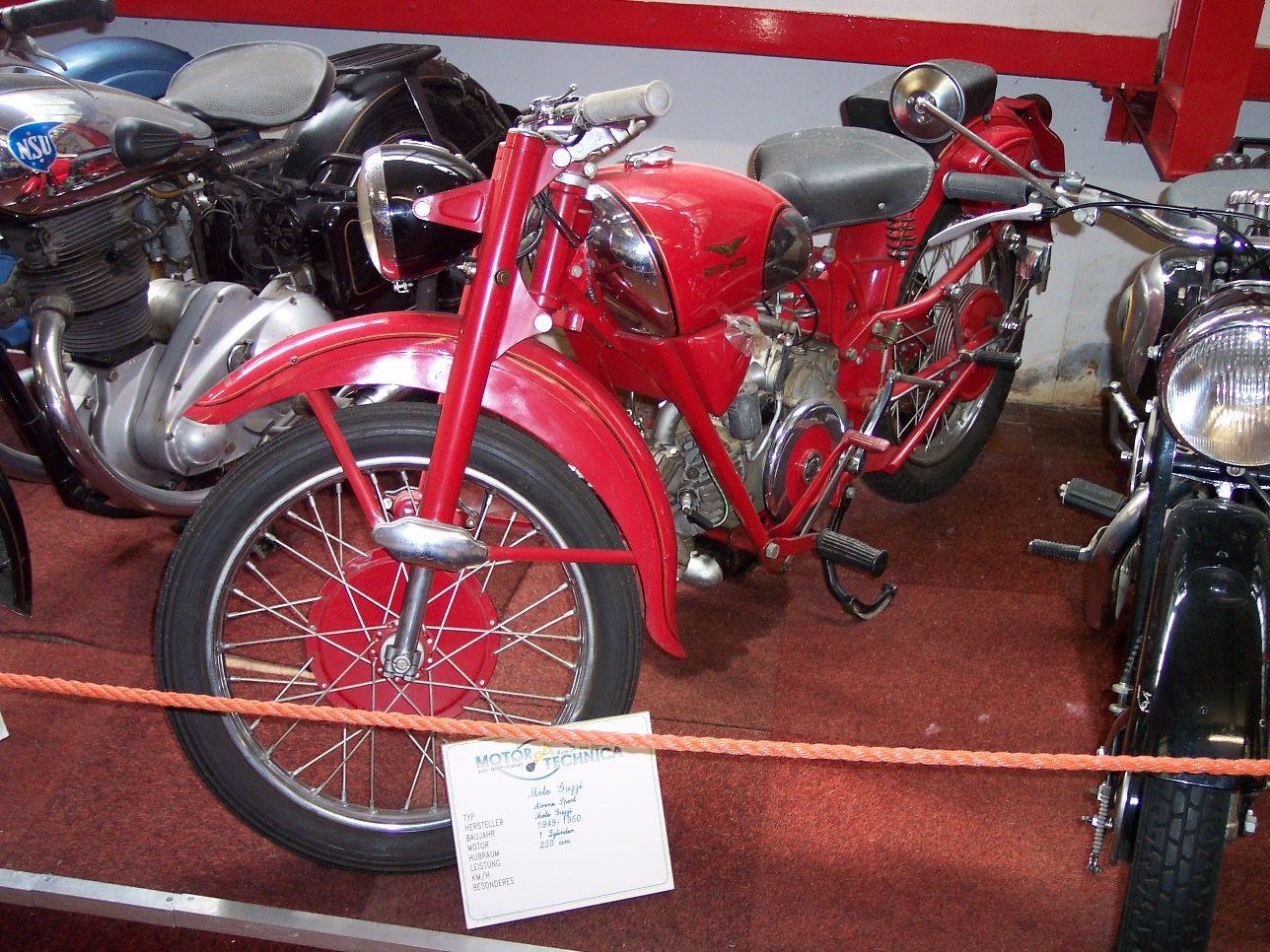
Moto Guzzi Airone Sport 1949

In the 1950s, Moto Guzzi, along with the Italian factories of Gilera and Mondial, led the world of Grand Prix motorcycle racing. With durable and lightweight 250 cc and 350 cc bikes designed by Giulio Carcano, the firm dominated the middleweight classes. The factory won five consecutive 350 cc world championships between 1953 and 1957. Realizing that low weight alone might not continue to win races for the company, Carcano designed the V8 500 cc GP race bike: its engine was one of the most complex of its time. Despite leading many races and frequently posting the fastest lap time, the V8 often failed to complete races because of mechanical problems. Its development ended when Moto Guzzi (together with its main competitors Gilera and Mondial) withdrew from racing after the 1957 season citing rising costs and falling motorcycle sales. By the time of its pull out from Grand Prix racing, Moto Guzzi had won 3,329 official races, 8 World Championships, 6 Constructor's Championships and 11 Isle of Man TT victories.

The period after World War II was as difficult in Mandello del Lario as it was elsewhere in post-war Europe. The solution was production of inexpensive, lighter cycles. The 1946 "Motoleggera", a 65 cc lightweight motorcycle originally—and still regularly—called the "Guzzino," became very popular in post-war Italy. It was produced until 1954. One reason for its success was that, even though it had a somewhat bicycle-like appearance, it still looked and felt more like a motorcycle than other low-end motorized two wheelers in the Italian market at the time. The Guzzinio was so popular that on 5 June 1949 Moto Guzzi held a rally for Guzzino owners at Mandello del Lario, attended by 14,000 people with 12,500 Guzzinos. A four-stroke 175 cc scooter known as the "Galletto" also sold well. Though modest cycles for the company, the lighter cycles continue to feature Guzzi's innovation and commitment to quality. The step-through Galletto initially featured a manual, foot-shifted three-speed (160 cc) configuration then later a four-speed (175 cc) set-up by the end of 1952. The displacement was increased to 192 cc in 1954 and electric start was added in 1961.

Moto Guzzi was limited in its endeavors to penetrate the important scooter market as motorcycle popularity waned after WWII. Italian scooter competitors would not tolerate an incursion from Moto Guzzi. By innovating the first large-wheeled scooter, Guzzi competed less directly with manufacturers of small-wheeled scooters such as Piaggio (Vespa) and Lambretta. To illustrate the delicate balance within the Italian post-war motorcycle and scooter markets, when Guzzi developed their own prototype for a small-wheeled scooter, Lambretta retaliated with a prototype for a small V-twin motorcycle threatening to directly compete on Moto Guzzi's turf. The two companies compromised: Guzzi never produced their small-wheeled scooter and Lambretta never manufactured the motorcycle. The drive train that Lambretta made in their 1953 motorcycle prototype remarkably resembles the V-twin + drive shaft arrangement that Guzzi developed more than ten years later, ultimately to become iconic of the company.

By 1964, the company was in full financial crisis. Emanuele Parodi and his son Giorgio had died, Carlo Guzzi had retired to private life, and direction passed to Enrico Parodi, Giorgio's brother. Carlo Guzzi died on 3 November 1964, in Mandello, after a brief hospital stay in Davos.

=== 1967–1973: SEIMM years ===
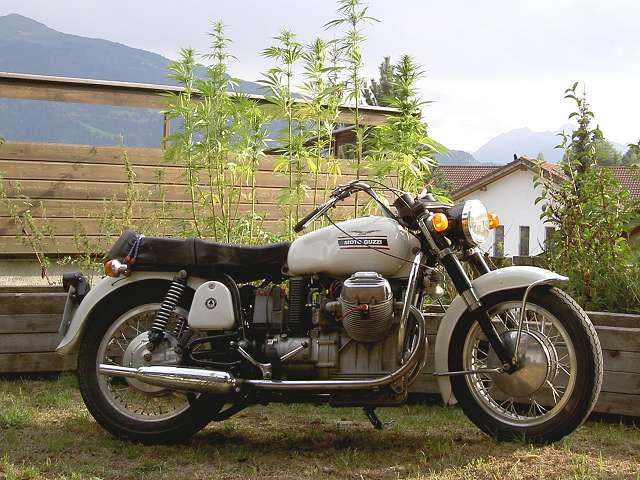
V7 750 Speciale (1969)

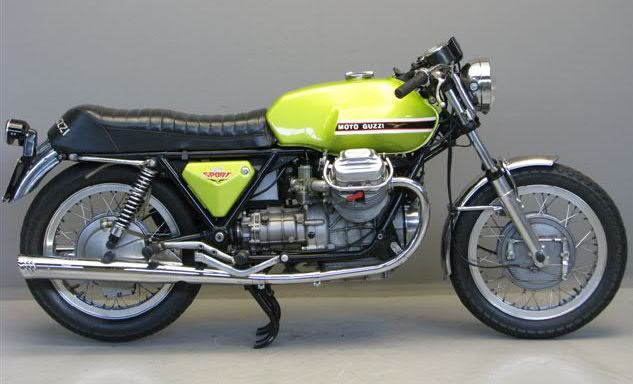
V7 Sport

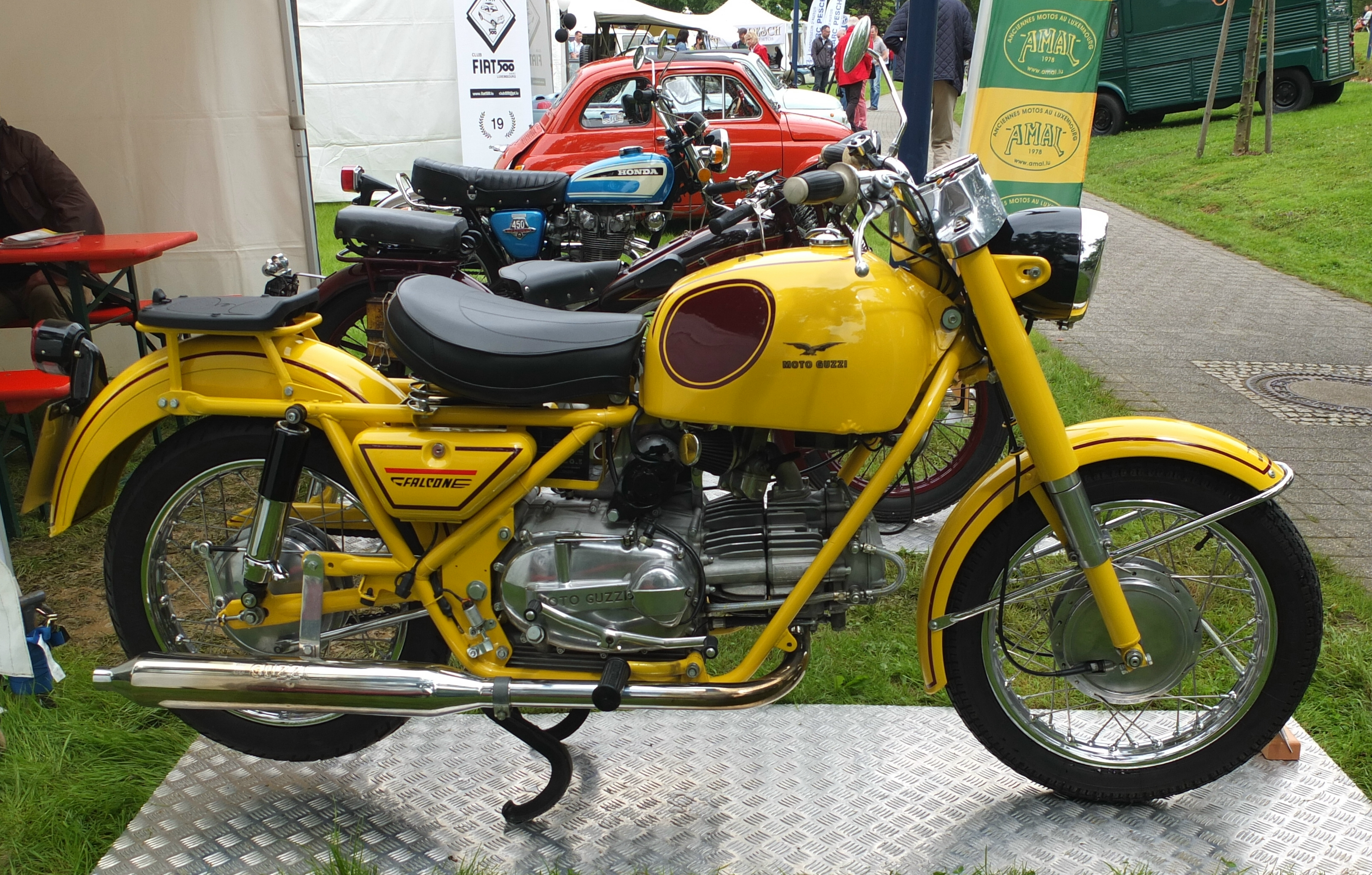
Customised Nuovo Falcone Militare (1970)

In February 1967, SEIMM (Società Esercizio Industrie Moto Meccaniche), a state-controlled receiver, took ownership of Moto Guzzi. The SEIMM oversight saw Moto Guzzi adapting to a cultural shift away from motorcycles to automobiles. The company focused on popular lightweight mopeds including the Dingo and Trotter – and the 125 cc Stornello motorcycle. Also during the SEIMM years, Guzzi developed the 90° V twin engine, designed by Giulio Cesare Carcano, which would become iconic of Moto Guzzi.

Though Moto Guzzi has employed engines of myriad configurations, none has come to symbolize the company more than the air-cooled 90° V-twin with a longitudinal crankshaft orientation and the engine's transverse cylinder heads projecting prominently on either side of the bike. The original V-twin was designed in the early 1960s by engineer Giulio Cesare Carcano, designer of the DOHC V8 Grand Prix racer. The air-cooled, longitudinal crankshaft, transverse cylinder, pushrod V-twin began life with 700 cc displacement and 45 hp (34 kW) – designed to win a competition sponsored by the Italian government for a new police bike. The sturdy shaft-drive, air-cooled V-twin won, giving Moto Guzzi renewed competitiveness. This 1967 Moto Guzzi V7 with the original Carcano engine has been continuously developed into the 1,200 cc, 80 hp (60 kW) versions. Lino Tonti redesigned the motor for the 1971 Moto Guzzi V7 Sport. This engine is the basis of the 750 cc, 1,100 cc and 1,200 cc Guzzi engines. As is the case in any other vehicle with longitudinal crankshaft and orientation of the engine there is a slight gyroscope effect, with a slightly asymmetrical behavior in turns.

=== 1973–2000: De Tomaso years ===
After experiencing financial difficulties in the late 1960s, De Tomaso Industries Inc. (D.T.I. Group or DTI), manufacturer of the De Tomaso sports and luxury cars, owned by Argentinian industrialist Alejandro de Tomaso, purchased SEIMM (and thereby Moto Guzzi) along with Benelli and Maserati in 1973. Under Tomaso's stewardship, Moto Guzzi returned to profitability, though other reports suggest a period of limited investment in Moto Guzzi followed attributed to DTI using Moto Guzzi financially prioritizing their automotive ventures.

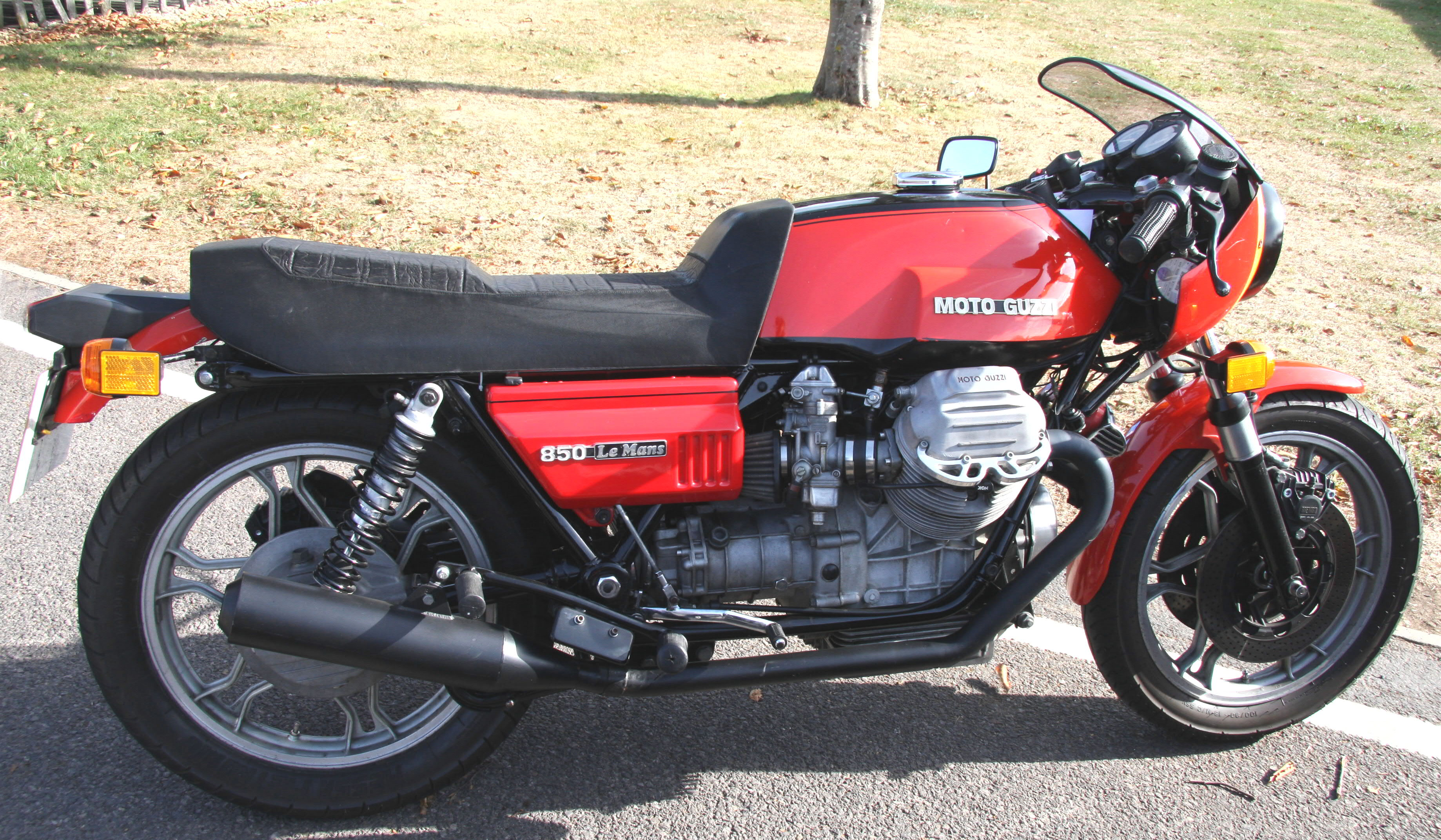
Moto Guzzi Le Mans 850

In November 1975 Guzzi first showed the 850 Le Mans at the Milan Show that was much later described as a "remarkably aggressive and attractive motorcycle". Today the early versions, the Series I especially, are considered one of the most iconic and collectible of all V-twin Moto Guzzis. A marketing success that would compete with other Italian superbikes, it spawned four later models from Mark II to its culmination in the 1990s, the Le Mans 1000 or Mark V. The initial model is known widely but incorrectly as the Mark I. Technically, it is simply the 850 Le Mans. It was named in homage to the 24-hour endurance race and circuit in France. The Mark I had two production runs with slight modifications. The first run, known as Series 1, used the roundish CEV stop/taillight used on many Italian bikes of the decade. Although it is often stated that fewer than 2,000 of these were made, Ian Falloon claims 219 were made in 1975 and a further 2,532 in 1976 although it is possible some of these were Series 2 bikes built at the end of the year. The Series 2 run totaled some 4,000 (2,548 in 1977, 1,737 in 1978). Falloon gives total Mark I production as 7,036. Series 2 used a De Tomaso-designed rectangular taillight/reflector and modified rear guard. This was also used on the Mark II and SP models. The taillight and guard was the biggest change between Series 1 and 2 but other modifications included later inclusion of a tripmeter, black fork lowers, a more generous dual seat that replaced the split-prone original seat, exhaust pipe heel guards and inferior fuel taps. The extra cost compared to the "cooking" T3 model paid for performance items such as high-compression domed pistons, larger inlet and exhaust valves and Dell'Orto 36 mm pumper carbs with filterless grey plastic velocity stacks. Most Mk I bikes were brilliant red although a very small number were painted in metallic ice blue. An exceedingly small number of Series 2 bikes were white.

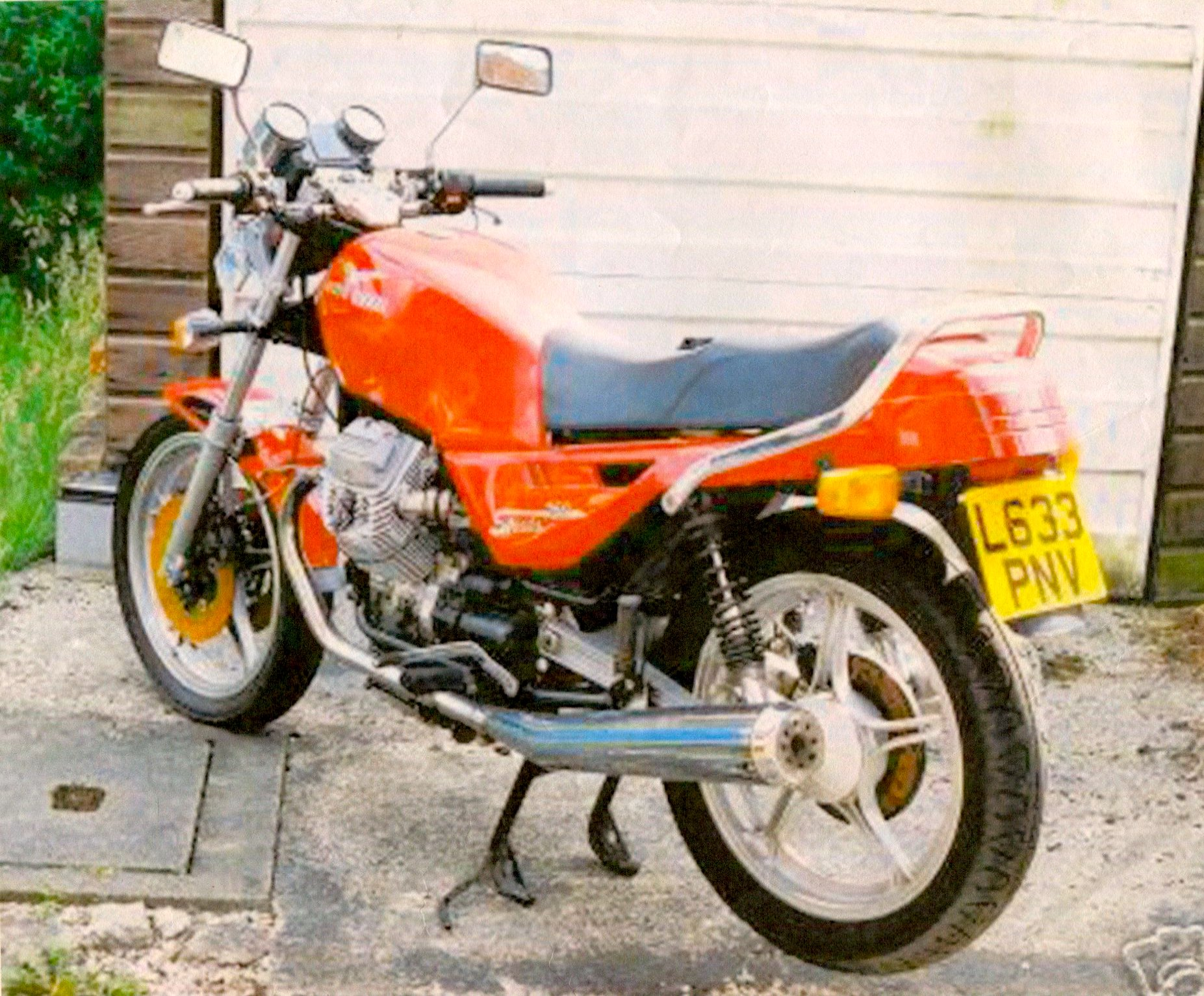
Moto Guzzi 750 Strada

In 1979, a small-block version of the air-cooled V-twin designed by engineer Lino Tonti was introduced as the V35. Radical when introduced, the design featured horizontally split crankcases and Heron heads. The former was a common feature of contemporary Japanese motorcycle design, whilst the latter was widely used in car engines. Both features allow more efficient mass production and also the design of the engine and associated components cut the weight from 548 lb (249 kg) of the contemporary 850 T3 to the 385 lb (175 kg) of the V35. The power of the original V35 at 35 bhp (26 kW) was competitive with engines of comparable displacement of the period – later, larger versions (V50, V65, V75) were rapidly outclassed by competing water-cooled engines. The Breva and Nevada today feature a descendant of Tonti's V35 engine: the 750 cc V-twin, rated at 48 bhp (36 kW). With its ease of maintenance, durability and even, flat torque curve, the engine design remains suitable to everyday, real-world situations. Two other Guzzi roadsters were the Strada 750 and Strada 1000.

As Guzzi continued to develop the V-twin, power was increased in the mid-1980s when Guzzi created four-valve versions of the "small block" series. Of these, the 650 and the 750 were rated at 60 bhp (45 kW) and 65 bhp (48 kW) respectively. The production of the four-valve "small block" engines ended in the later 1980s.

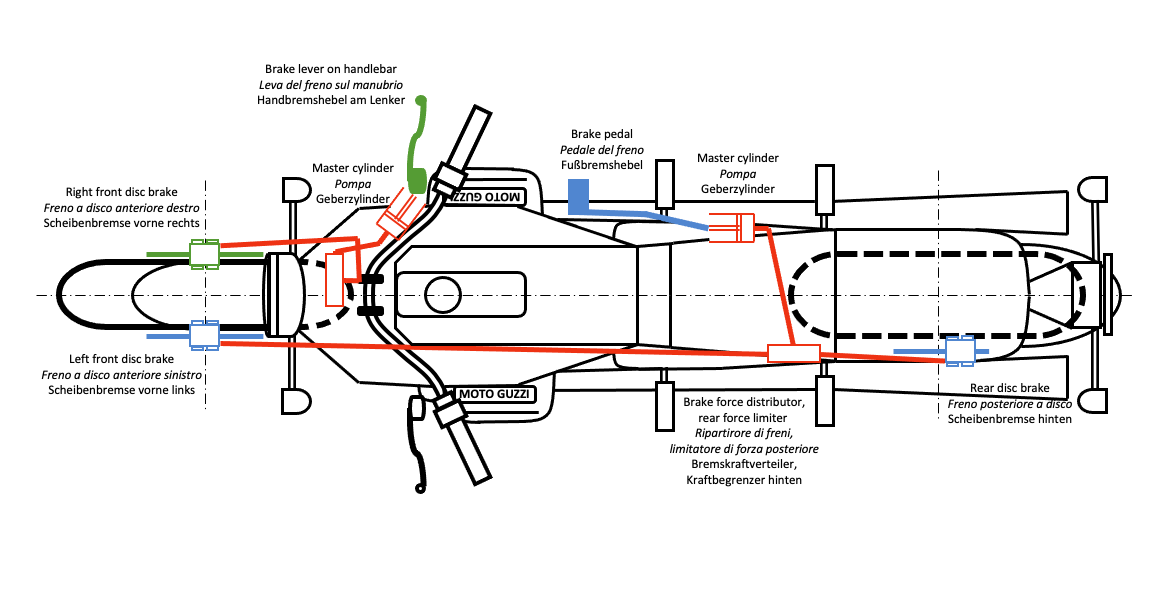
Integrated braking system of the 850 T3 (1975–1979)

Moto Guzzis have used a hydraulic integrated brake system, where the right front disc works off the handlebar lever, while the left front and the rear disc work off the foot brake. The first models were the 1975 750 S3, 850 T3 and V1000 I Convert. From the end of the 1970s, it was standard on most "big block" models. The last one was the California 1100 built until 2012.

The cartridge front fork used in Guzzi's motorcycles of the later 1970s and 1980s is a Guzzi invention. Instead of containing the damping oil in the fork, it is in a cartridge. Oil in the fork is purely for lubrication.

Still under the De Tomaso umbrella, in 1988, Benelli and SEIMM merged to create Guzzi Benelli Moto (G.B.M. S.p.A.). During this period, Moto Guzzi existed as an entity within the De Tomaso owned G.B.M., but in 1996 celebrated its 75th birthday and the return of its name to Moto Guzzi S.p.A. In 1996, De Tomaso became Trident Rowan Group, also known as TRG.

=== 2000–2004: Aprilia years ===
Under the helm of Ivano Beggio, Aprilia acquired Moto Guzzi S.p.A. on 14 April 2000 for $65 million. According to the original press release, the intention had been that Moto Guzzi would remain headquartered in Mandello del Lario and would share Aprilia's technological, R&D capabilities and financial resources as well. The arrangement would remain short-lived, as Aprilia itself stumbled financially. At the same time Aprilia attempted to diversify in other areas of manufacturing, new Italian laws required helmets for motorcyclists and raising insurance rates for teenage motorcyclists, severely affected the company's profitability. Nonetheless, Aprilia had committed large sums to renovating the Mandello Moto Guzzi factory – renovations that were ultimately completed. Ducati again made an offer for Moto Guzzi during Aprilia's financial difficulties, as it had before when Aprilia had purchased Moto Guzzi in 2000. Other potential buyers included Kymco and the BRP subsidiary Rotax, Kymco reportedly making the highest offer. The Moto Guzzi assembly line closed for a short period in March 2004, due to the financial difficulties.

=== 2004–present: Piaggio years ===
On 30 December 2004, Piaggio Group acquired Aprilia. Moto Guzzi S.p.A. officially becomes a Unico Azionista of Piaggio, part of Immsi S.p.A. Investments have allowed the introduction of a series of competitive new models in rapid succession.

In November 2007, Moto Guzzi unveiled the retro-themed 2008 V7 Classic at the Motorcycle and Bicycle Manufacturers show in Milan, Italy. It was available in Europe in mid-2008, and Moto Guzzi announced plans in late-2008 to make it available to US buyers. The company has begun making limited collectors' editions of Guzzi originals.

=== Key people ===
Key people associated with Moto Guzzi since its launch include:

Founders:

- Carlo Guzzi (1889–1964): conceived the marque with Giovani Ravelli and Giorgio Parodi – each members of the mechanics Italian Air Corp. He died in November 1964 aged 75.
- Giorgio Parodi (1897–1955): aircraft pilot, whose father financed the original company.
- Giovanni Ravelli (d. 1918): one of the original three friends who envisioned a company that would engineer and sell motorcycles—what was later to become Moto Guzzi—was not present at the formal birth of Moto Guzzi in 1921, having perished in a 1918 air crash. At the time he met Guzzi and Parodi, he had already established himself as an accomplished motorcycle racer, having raced in the 1913 Tourist Trophy on a Premier 500.

Engineers:

- Giulio Cesare Carcano: engineer with Guzzi from 1936 to 1966, inventor of the DOHC V8 engine and the air-cooled V-twin that became synonymous with Moto Guzzi. He died in September 2005 after a second career as a Naval Architect but remained in service to Moto Guzzi into his retirement.
- Umberto Todero: Joining Moto Guzzi in 1939, his career spanned from the days of the original founders, through the SEIMM, de Tomaso, and Aprilia years, into the ownership of Piaggio. He died while still in service to the company in February 2005.
- Lino Tonti: engineer, joined the company in 1967 to replace Carcano, developed the V7 Sport, the small block V50, and the Tonti Frame.

Racers:

- Giuseppe Guzzi (14 August 1882 – 6 June 1962): Carlo's brother, rode the famed GT Norge on the 1928 Arctic Circle raid to test the first motorcycle rear swingarm suspension.
- Stanley Woods: esteemed motorcycle racer who captained Moto Guzzi's to numerable Isle of Man TT wins.
- Omobono Tenni: celebrated 47 victories racing for Moto Guzzi in the period between 1933 and 1948.
- Bill Lomas: won the 1955 and 1956 350 cc world championship for Moto Guzzi, defeating multi-cylinder machines on his and aerodynamic single-cylinder bike. The Mandello Guzzi Museum has a section devoted to Lomas' two world title wins and also his outings on the legendary Moto Guzzi Grand Prix 500 cc V8.
- John Wittner: American dentist, highly skilled pilot and mechanic, craftsman of the 1000 Daytona, with engineer Umberto Todero.

== Production figures ==
- 1929: 2,500 units
- 1971: 46,487 units (historic high)
- 1993: 3,274 units (historical low)
- 1994: 4,300 units (approx)
- 1997: 5,600 units (approx)
- 1998: 5,647 units
- 1999: 6,275 units
- 2004: fewer than 4,000 units
- 2005: fewer than 5,000 units
- 2006: greater than 10,000 units
- 2011: 5,763
- 2012: 6,664
- 2013: 6,800

== Technical innovations ==
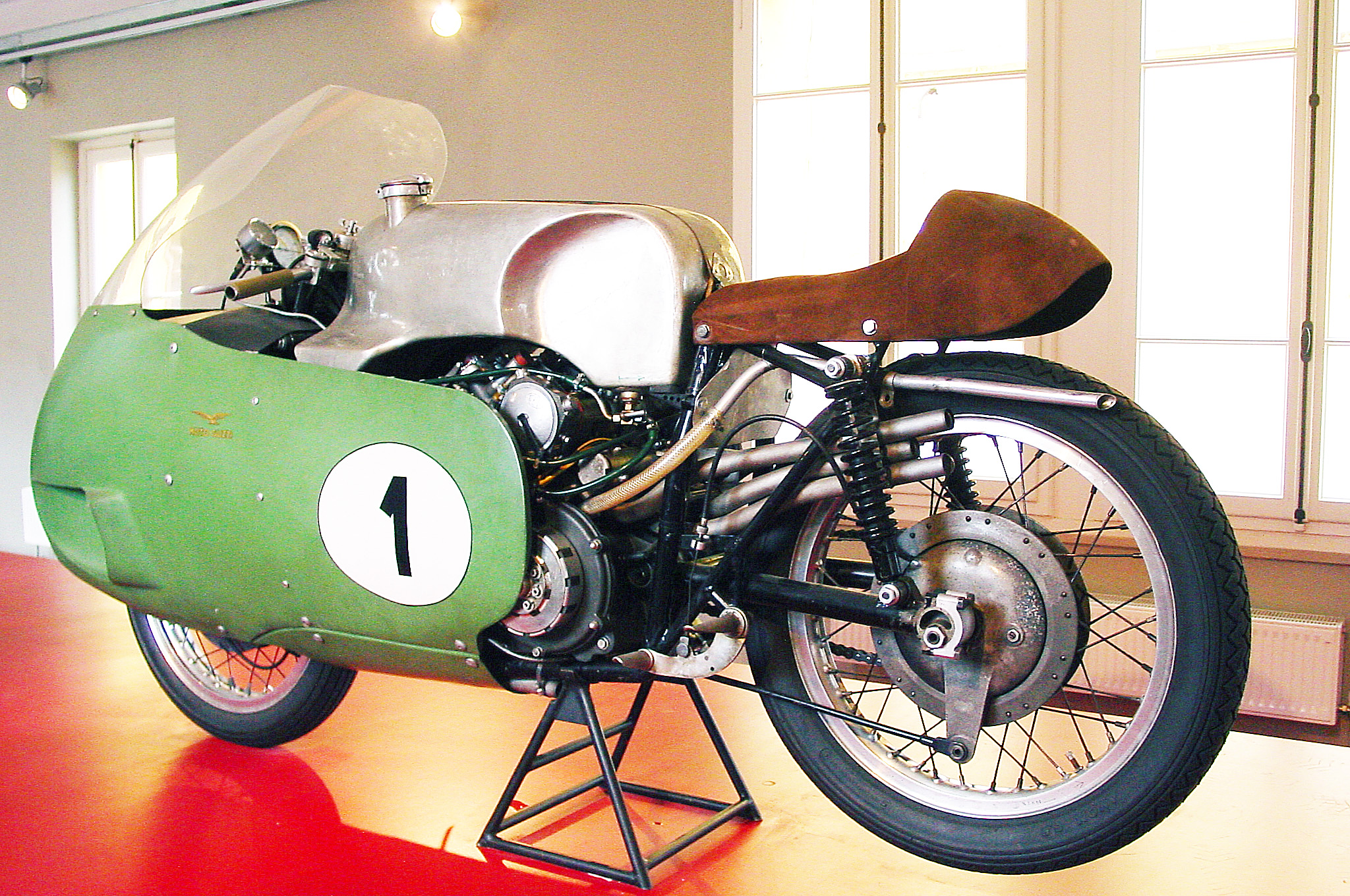
The DOHC V8 Grand Prix Motorcycle: 170 mph (270 km/h) in 1957

=== CARC ===
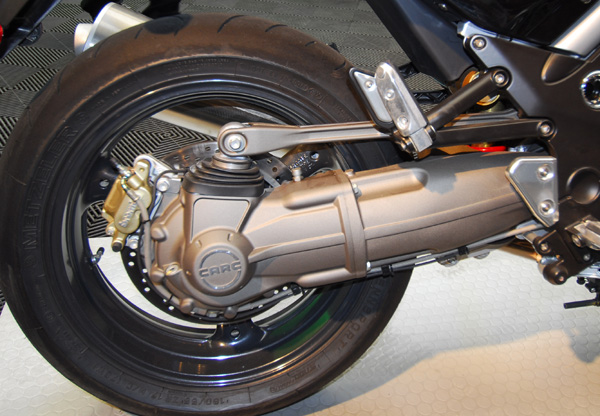
Griso 1100 CARC: Compact Reactive Drive Shaft

(Cardano Reattivo Compatto): Above a certain power level the competing forces of drive-shaft arrangements can severely disrupt the suspension of a motorcycle (especially at application of throttle), a phenomenon called "shaft jacking". Moto Guzzi introduced its first anti-jacking system with the Daytona in 1993 and evolved that design though the 2005 V11 Sport. Guzzi later introduced their CARC system, emulating the BMW Paralever design and serving the same function. Kawasaki introduced its Tetra-lever system for similar reasons on the Kawasaki Concours 14 (also known as the 1400 GTR). Arturo Magni (1925–2015) had sold "parallelogrammo" rear suspension kit in the early 1980s to resolve similar anti-torque issues.

Moto Guzzi's Breva 750, Nevada 750, and California Vintage fall below the threshold that requires an anti-jacking drive-shaft system.

The Breva 1100, Griso, Norge, Bellagio, Stelvio and 1200 Sport feature Guzzi's recently patented swingarm system, marketed as Compact Reactive Shaft Drive – also known as Ca. R.C. or CARC – introduced with the Breva 1100 in 2005. The system separates the shaft final drive's torque reaction from the suspension via floating torque arms and thereby eliminates the abruptness typical of shaft drive systems on acceleration or throttle-release – still providing a quiet, reliable and low maintenance drive system. Reviewers have observed excellent braking performance and drive train smoothness attributable to the CARC system.

=== Rear swingarm suspension ===
By 1928, long-distance motorcycle travel was limited by the lack of effective rear suspension design. Until then, alternative designs sacrificed torsional rigidity – gaining comfort but severely compromising handling. Carlo Guzzi and his brother Giuseppe designed an elastic frame using a sheet-steel box enclosing four springs, together with a swingarm in tubes and sheet metal. The first Moto Guzzi bike to employ the suspension was named the G.T. (for Gran Turismo, Grand Touring), and to prove the suspension – and gain publicity for Moto Guzzi – the brothers conceived a challenging 4,000-mile (6,400 km) journey from Mandello del Lario to Capo Nord in northern Norway. Despite the very poor condition of European roads at that time, Giuseppe Guzzi reached the Arctic Circle in four weeks. The elastic frame rear suspension was immediately introduced to production machines, transforming the usability of the motorcycle as an everyday form of transportation. In 2006, Moto Guzzi retraced the 'raid' of 1928 to introduce the Norge 1200. The word "Norge" is Norwegian for "Norway".

=== First DOHC V8 motorcycle engine ===
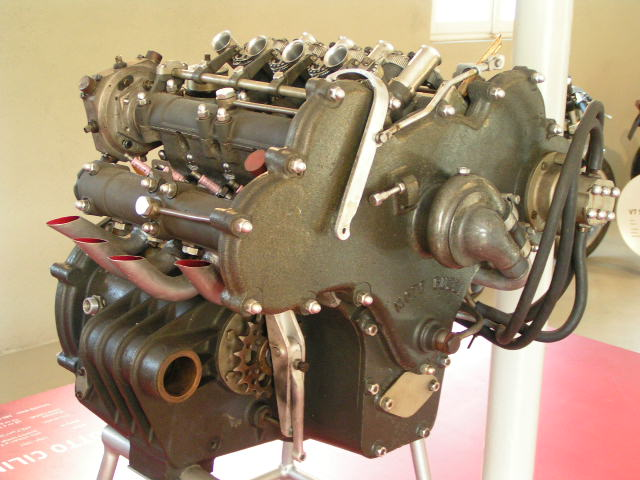
The DOHC V8 at the Moto Guzzi Museum, Mandello del Lario

The Moto Guzzi Grand Prix V8, introduced in 1955, was a 500 cc racing motorcycle fitted with a V8 engine using dual overhead camshafts (DOHC). The engine was conceived by Giulio Carcano, Enrico Cantoni, Umberto Todero, Ken Kavanagh and Fergus Anderson just after the 1954 Monza Grand Prix and designed by Dr. Carcano. The bore and stroke of the engine were 44.0 mm × 40.5 mm (1.73 in × 1.59 in): there were two valves per cylinder. Power was in the region of 80 bhp (60 kW) at 12,000 rpm, approximately 10 to 15 bhp (7.5–11.2 kW) more than the rival 4-cylinder MV Agustas and Gileras.

The engine and the bike were unprecedented. The motorcycle proved capable of achieving 172 mph (280 km/h)—thirty years before the speed was reached again in Grand Prix motorcycle racing. However, the Otto Cilindri proved difficult to ride, as well as complex and expensive to build and maintain—bikes suffered broken crankshafts, overheating and seizing—all in addition to the danger the bike posed to the racers themselves. By 1957, there were two bikes available and no one willing to race the bike without further development and the bike was withdrawn.

=== Motorcycle wind tunnel ===
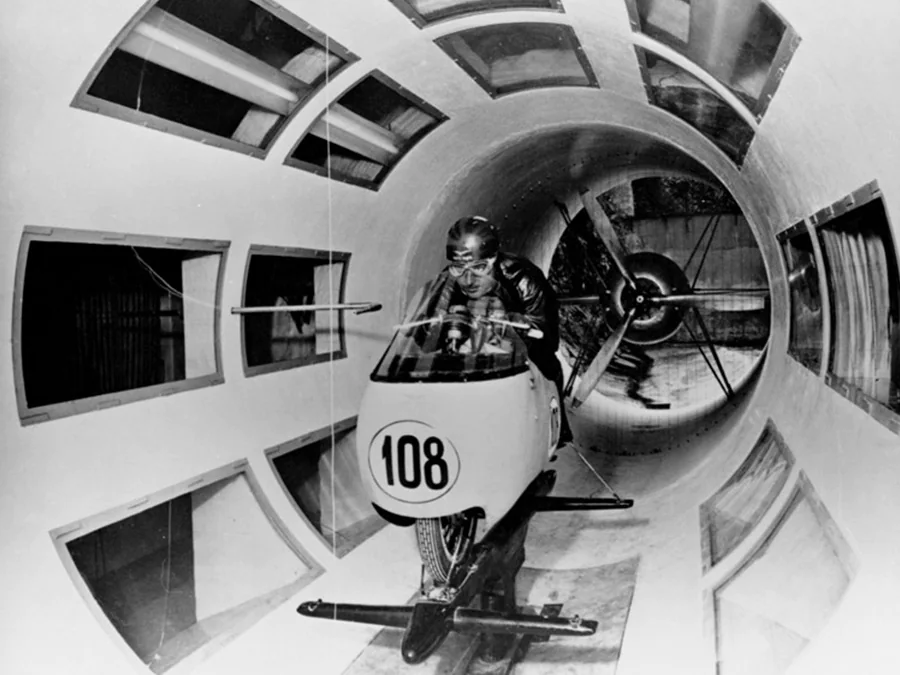
Interior view, The Moto Guzzi Wind Tunnel, Moto Guzzi Headquarters, Mandello del Lario, Italy, c. 1950s

In 1950 Moto Guzzi created the first motorcycle wind tunnel, La Galleria del Vento, capable of testing 1:1 prototypes at the Mandello del Lario works, thereby allowing the company to market an integral fairing. The wind tunnel enabled racers to mimic real-life riding conditions and optimize their seating and body position at varying racing speeds – an unprecedented advantage for racing and production motorcycles. In motorcycle prototyping, Moto Guzzi could refine the air stream around the motorcycle itself, develop an envelope of still air around the rider, reduce frontal area, optimize air penetration, and maximize fuel economy.

The wind tunnel design is a modification of the open-circuit Eiffel type (after Gustave Eiffel, designer of the Eiffel Tower in Paris), consisting of three sections. Air is drawn into the "Air Duct" with an aperture of 8.2 m (26.9 ft), airspeed increases as it is passed through smaller and smaller diameters reaching max wind speed in the "Test Chamber" with a diameter of 2.6 m (8.5 ft), and finally is exhausted through the "Outlet/Discharge" duct containing the fan mechanism – a three-bladed variable speed propeller driven by a 310 hp (231 kW) electric motor.

Located outside of the testing chamber adjacent to the central section, a control room houses fan mechanism controls and the measuring instruments. Outside of the chamber is a large dial "Scala Convenzionale" or "Conventional Scale" to indicate the varying degree of resistance offered by the motorcycle (and rider) to the passing air. Around the circumference of the dial, red lights at each degree provide a visual indicator to the rider and test personnel. This large scale remains visible to the rider in the tunnel during testing and by repositioning himself on the bike he can determine the changing and optimal resistance. A second measurement tool was an alcohol-filled micro-manometer connected to a Pitot tube placed at a 90–degree angle to the airflow in the tunnel.

It is unknown to what extent the wind tunnel is used currently. The December 2005 press release for the Norge 1200 states that the bike was "thoroughly tested" in the Mandello wind tunnel. Aprilia, a company in the same group as Moto Guzzi, maintains a relationship with the aerodynamics program at the University of Perugia, where computer simulations combined with practical tests (done in smaller tunnels using scale models) can more effectively and economically provide accurate testing and feedback.

=== Truck-motorcycle hybrid ===
The Ercole (Hercules), produced in 1928, was capable of carrying an 800 lb (363 kg) load. Guzzi built a range of "goods vehicles", from 50 cc to 500 cc, between 1928 and 1980.

=== Large-wheel scooter ===
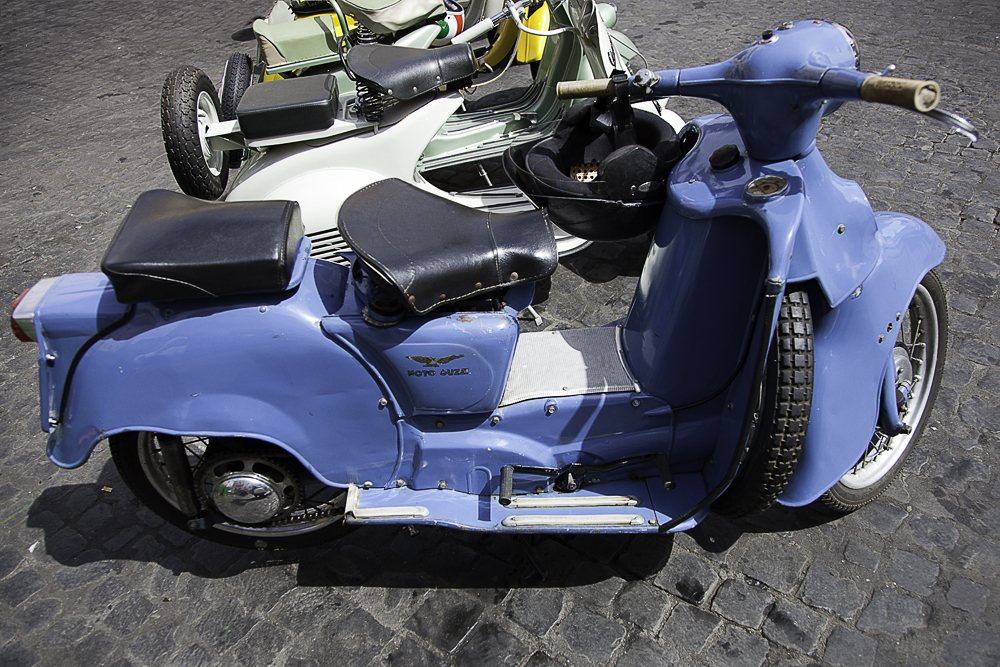
Moto Guzzi's Large Wheel Scooter

Though the design criteria of a scooter have grown increasingly fluid, historically a scooter featured small wheels – especially in post-war Italy (due to huge stockpiles of landing-gear tyres for fighter planes, made redundant with the ending of the war and sold off as surplus). The configuration, along with a compact engine, allowed the scooter its trademark step-through design. With the 1950 introduction of the Galletto 160, Moto Guzzi developed a large-wheel scooter. The larger and heavier wheels afforded greater gyroscopic force and thereby greater balance. Large-wheeled scooters also reduced vulnerability to pot-holes. The Galletto not only offered larger wheels, it carried its own spare.

== Motorcycle models ==
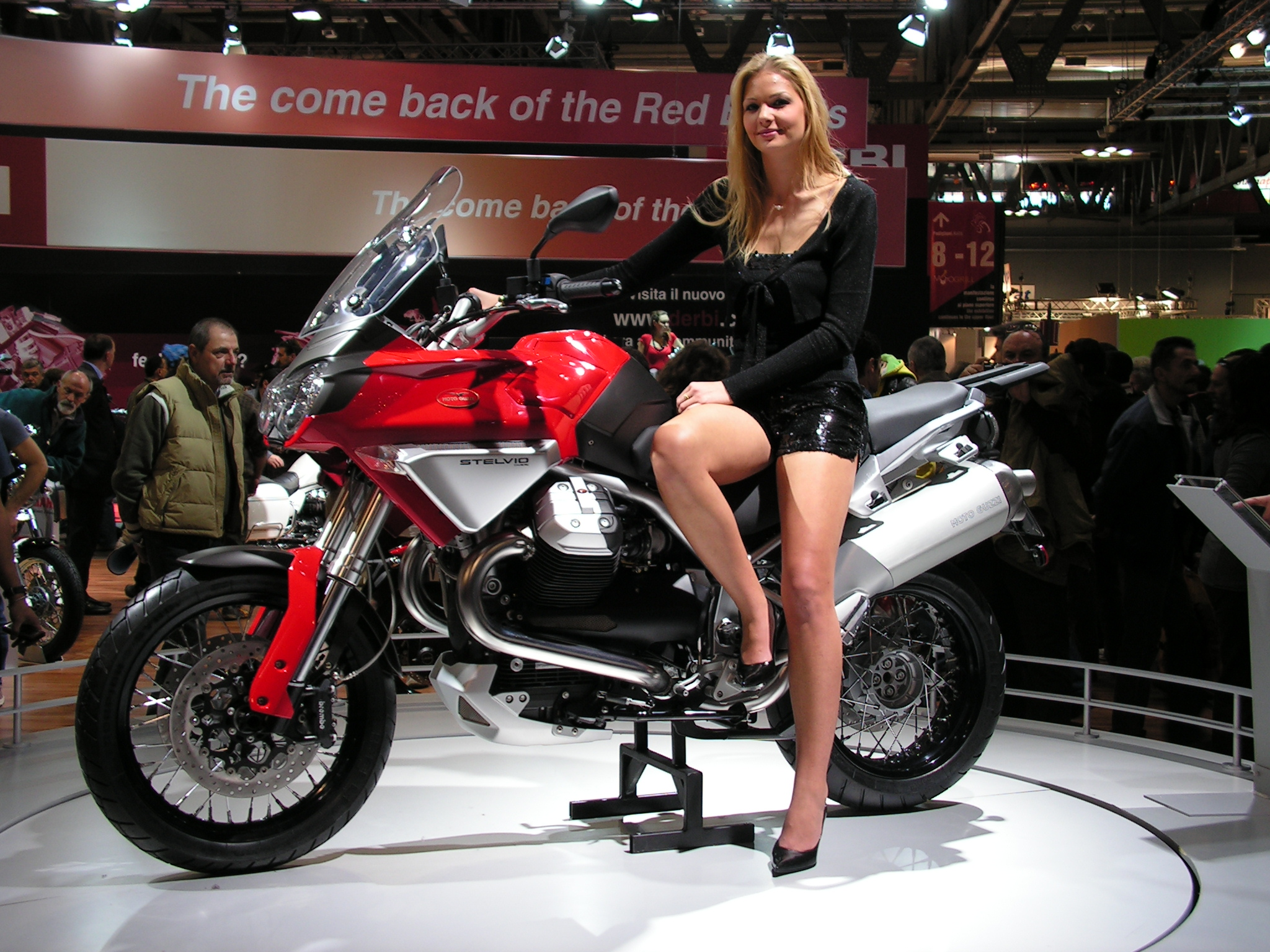
Moto Guzzi Stelvio

Moto Guzzi models currently in production include the V7 850, V9 bobber. In 2019, Guzzi released the V85 TT Adventure which comes in two varieties; a streetwise version for urban commutes and road trips, and a rally-style package with a more off-road focus. Guzzis has announced the release of their first water cooled motorcycle; the 1050cc v100 Mandello. This will be an upscale sport tourer with 115 hp and 77ftlbs of torque.see moto guzzis website.

Guzzi has made a number of historic racing and military motorcycles. The historic racing heritage is best epitomized in the Le Mans model range, still held today to be a styling masterpiece and motorcycle design as an art form.

Through various periods of its history, Moto Guzzi has produced models specifically for military and police forces. The Italian police and military and various US police departments (e.g. LAPD) have used Moto Guzzi bikes in their fleets. Guzzi currently markets police versions of model range – the Breva (all three models) most commonly, as well as the Norge, adopted by Berlin police.

== Factory, company headquarters and museum ==
Since 1921, Moto Guzzi headquarters have been located in Mandello del Lario on the Lecco branch of Lake Como. The facility began at a size of 300 m^{2} (3,200 sq ft), and by the early 1950s Moto Guzzi covered 24,000 m^{2} (260,000 sq ft) with a workforce of over 1,500. As of 1999, the complex included one, two and three story buildings of over 54,000 m^{2} (580,000 sq ft), operating at approximately 50% of production capacity.

During its ownership tenure, Aprilia considered moving the entire operation to Monza, under protest from the Guzzisti and Mandello factory workers. Instead, Aprilia renovated the factory in 2004 at a cost of $45 million.

The original Mandello site remains home to the company's headquarters, the production facility, the historic wind tunnel, the company library, and the museum. The Moto Guzzi Museum displays models from the company's history, engines that retrace Guzzi's engineering history, and a series of important prototypes. The museum is open to the public and includes a gift shop featuring books, clothing and accessories. Moto Guzzi currently employs roughly 250 to 300 employees, making over 10,000 bikes per year.

For decades, the Moto Guzzi factory carried a set of internally lit block letters along the rooftop (and also over the entry gate) spelling "Moto Guzzi". In May 2007, the original roof sign, old and worn, was replaced with a new brighter sign carrying the current official logo and script. At the same time, the factory entrance gate received a new rectangular version of the sign.

== Customer engagement ==
Since 2001, Moto Guzzi has annually hosted Giornate Mondiali Guzzi, also known as GMG or World Guzzi Days, inviting fans to Mandello. In 2006 over 15,000 Guzzi fans from over 20 countries traveled to Mandello for the event.

== See also ==
- List of Italian companies
- List of motorcycle manufacturers
- List of Moto Guzzi motorcycles
