= List of Moto Guzzi motorcycles =

This is a list of motorcycles manufactured by Moto Guzzi.

== Current and recent models ==
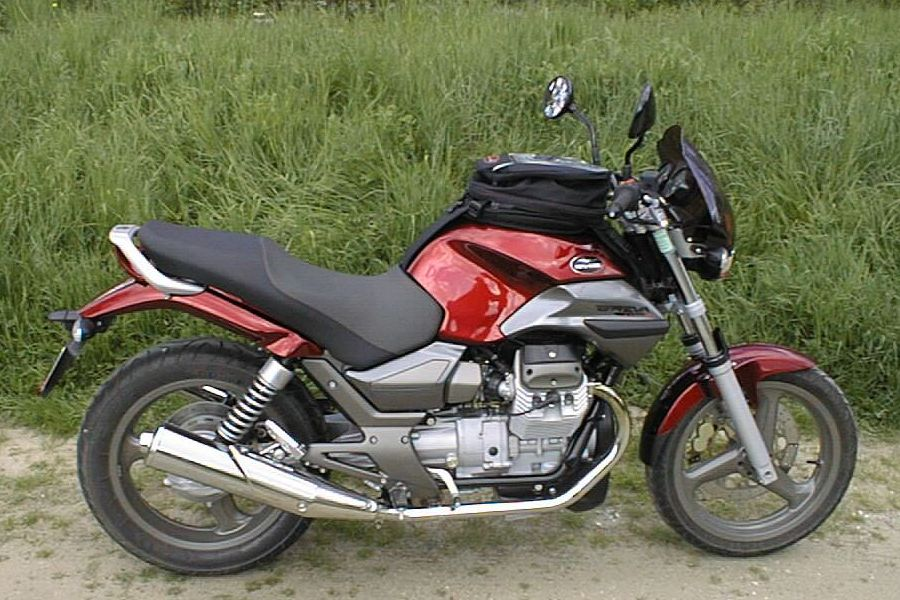
2003 Moto Guzzi Breva 750ie

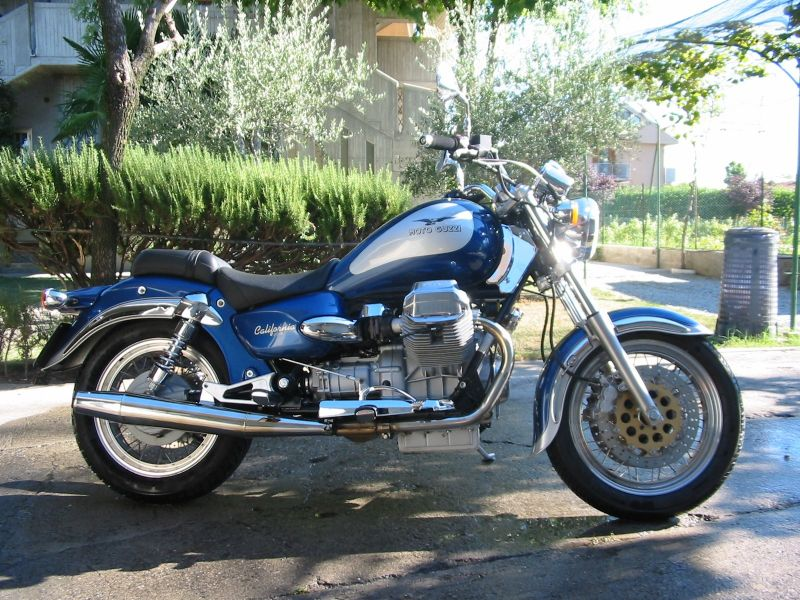
Moto Guzzi California Special

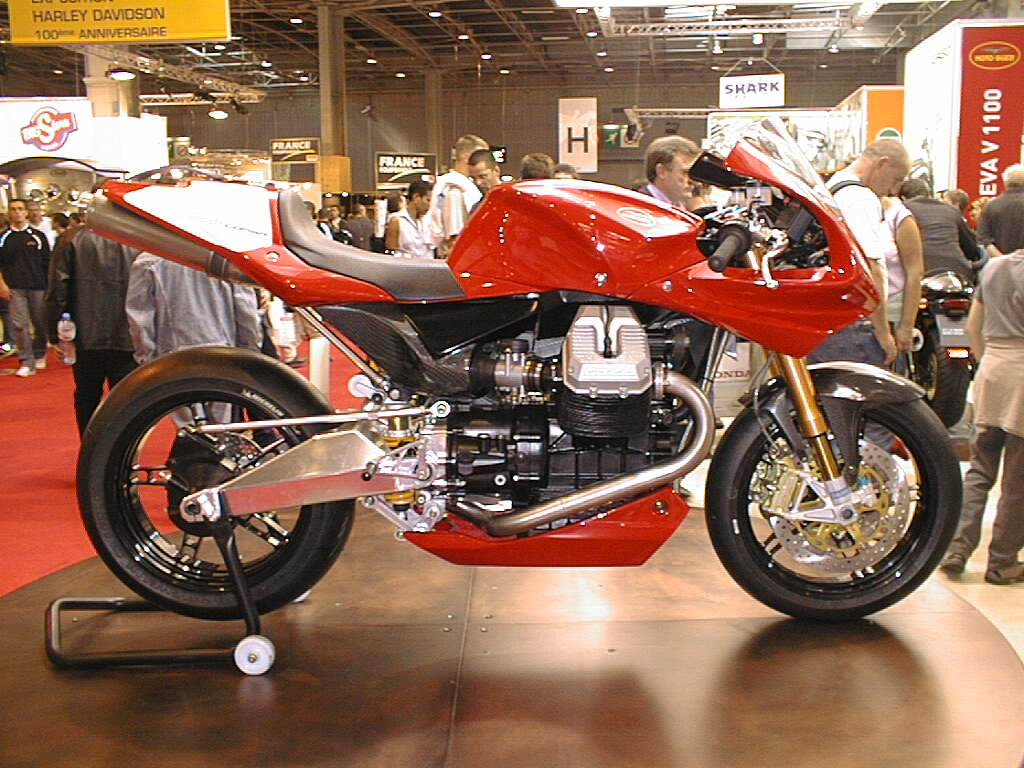
Moto Guzzi MGS-01 Corsa

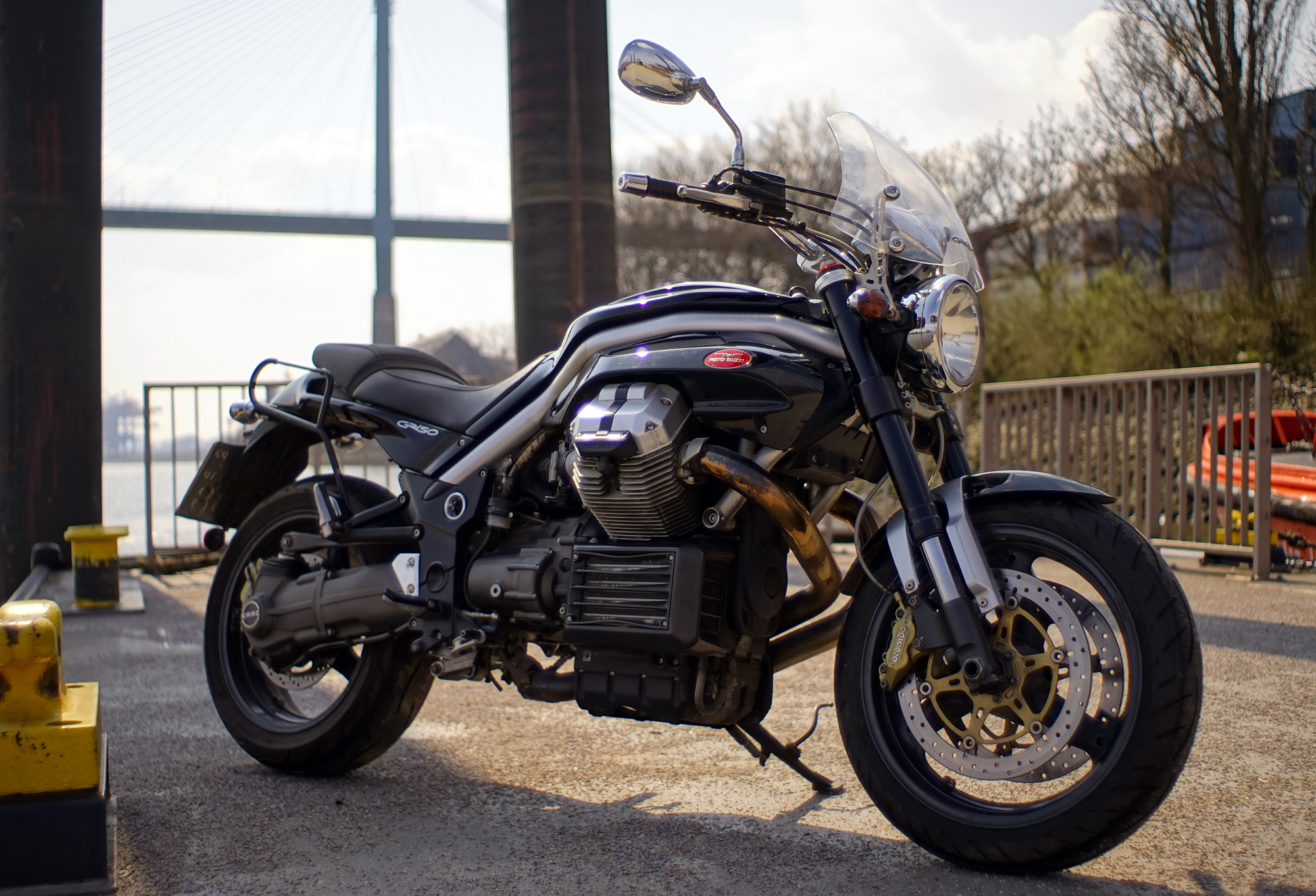
Moto Guzzi Griso 1100 with windshield

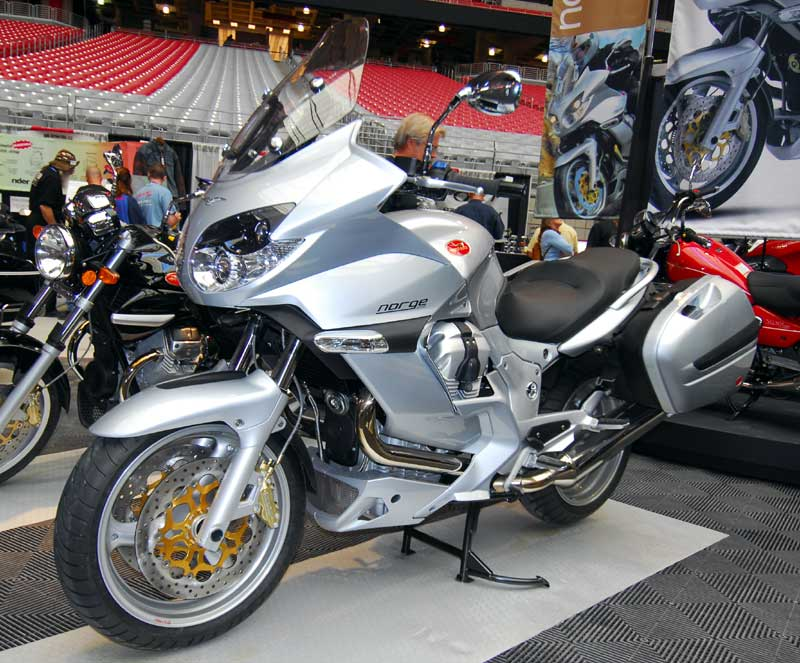
2007 Moto Guzzi Norge 1200

2003 saw the start of a substantial revitalization in Moto Guzzi's lineup and engineering work, beginning with the launch of a new V-twin in three displacements, the first Euro 3 compliant engine in the world. A succession of new models has followed.

- Bellagio (936 cc) (since 2007): named after a town across Lake Como from the Moto Guzzi headquarters — features custom styling, and a matt-black paint scheme. With a standard riding position, the Bellagio was introduced at EICMA 2006 (tentatively named the "940 Custom"), along with a new 1,200 cc, 8-valve engine, a 940 cc 4-valve engine, the new Griso 1200 and Norge 850. Though not currently available in North America, a recent Piaggio press release indicates the Bellagio is key to Guzzi's North American presence
- Breva is named after the breeze called the Breva that blows across Lake Como, where the Moto Guzzi factory is situated. The motorcycles were manufactured in four configurations: 750, 850, 1100 and 1200. The three larger models differ from the 750, featuring CARC suspension and enhanced performance.
  - Breva 750 i.e. or Breva V 750 i.e. (744 cc) (2002–2009): The Breva was the first motorcycle developed and marketed by Moto Guzzi after the company became a subsidiary of Aprilia. As a standard motorcycle, the Breva 750 was formally introduced to the press at Intermot 2002, Munich. Like the Nevada, the Breva 750 features the 'small block' engine derived directly from the engine Carcano designed for Guzzi in the mid-1960s and Tonti refined: the 750 cc V-twin, rated at 48 bhp (36 kW). With its ease of maintenance, durability and even, flat torque curve, the engine design remains suitable to everyday, real-world situations. To mark the rejuvenation of Moto Guzzi, the first Breva 750 was delivered to its owner on April 7, 2003, in a special ceremony at the Mandello works. Likewise, the first 100 Breva 750's were delivered to their Italian dealers in a special ceremony on March 26, 2003, at Mandello del Lario headquarters on the occasion of the company's anniversary.
  - Breva 850 (877 cc) (since 2006): a variation featuring the 850 engine, not available in the US.
  - Breva 1100/1100 ABS (1,064 cc) (since 2005): introduced in Europe in 2005 and in the US in 2006. Breva 1100 ABS not available in the US.
- California
  - California 1400 Touring (1,380 cc) – The hard bagger version of the new California 1400 - With classic transversal V2 architecture and introducing technologies new to the Moto Guzzi brand including ride-by-wire throttle, cruise control, and traction control.
  - California 1400 Custom (1,380 cc) - Pared-down version of the 1400 California, sans hard bags and windshield and with drag-style handlebars, also utilizing the new v2 1400 engine.
  - MGX21 Flying Fortress for 2017 this bagger model is largely based on the California 1400 (1,380 cc) model the frame and associated pieces have been tweaked just slightly to accommodate the larger 21-inch front wheel and anticipated load and real carbon fiber used for all bodywork.
  - Audace (1,380 cc) - a sportier, matt-black/red version based on the California, with drag bars and footpegs. Comes with the standard rider modes, three stage traction control and ABS Brembo brakes.
- Griso
  - Griso 1100 (1,064 cc) (since 2005): Italianised version of the Lombard word for "gray one", named after a gray-bearded character in the famous Italian novel The Betrothed—a riding posture between sport and standard; first saw light as a prototype at EICMA 2003 in Milan, when Moto Guzzi was still owned by Aprilia. After Piaggio absorbed Moto Guzzi, they proceeded (in house) to quickly develop the Griso for production, adapting Guzzi's historic V-twin engine to the new bike. In keeping with the bike's hard-edged, techno-custom styling, an oversized oil radiator graces the right side of the engine, in plain view.
  - Griso 8V – In September 2007 at GMG, Moto Guzzi introduced the Griso 8V, featuring a heavily revised engine with four valves per cylinder. Motorcycle News wrote: "in doing so, the striking-looking Griso has been transformed from a lumbering yet evocative old-school roadster into a charging rhino of a motorcycle with true 140 mph (230 km/h) potential." At 1,151 cc, the engine has been heavily revised, and the bike now features an unusual exhaust with a "8" cross-section at the rear, revised brakes, handlebars and seat.
  - Griso 850 (877 cc) (since 2006): variation of the Griso with the 850 engine, not available in the US.
- Nevada Classic 750 i.e. (744 cc) (since 2004): named after the previous Guzzi Nevada (1991–2001) — first available May 2004; meets Euro 3 emissions standard; low seat height (760 mm); standard riding posture, light weight (184 kg dry); suitable for around town, short and medium distance touring; compared to previous carburetted model: 383 components out of a total of 441 components redesigned or renewed; the only "entry-level" custom with shaft drive, electronic injection; very similar in spec to the Breva 750 (since 2010 Nevada Anniversario).
- Norge
  - Norge 850 (877 cc) (since 2007) a variation of the Norge model, equipped with the 850 engine, not available in the US.
  - Norge 1200 (1,134 cc) (since 2005): a GT (Gran Turismo) bike that derives its name from the original GT Norge famous for making a 4,000-mile (6,400 km) test ride in 1928—from the company headquarters in Italy to just inside the Arctic Circle of Norway's Capo Nord — to prove its suspension prototype: the world's first rear swingarm suspension. Moto Guzzi celebrated the 2005 Norge introduction by re-tracing the 1928 ride. Reinforcing Moto Guzzi's history, the design of the Norge and its fairing was refined in the company's historic wind tunnel at the Mandello del Lario headquarters.
- Stelvio 1200 (1,134 cc) (since 2008): named after the famous Stelvio Pass in the Italian Alps, this adventure touring type of dual sport motorbike is directly aimed at the market defined by the highly successful BMW GS. It is currently (2011) available in two versions: the Stelvio ABS and the Stelvio NTX. Whilst both models of Stelvio can be said to be toward the road-biased end of the adventure touring spectrum, the NTX version has been fitted with parts that make it more suitable to rough terrain (spoked wheels, sump guard, crash rails).
- 1200 Sport/1200 Sport ABS (1,151 cc) (since 2006): originally to have been named the Breva S—introduced at Intermot 2006 in Cologne, heavily revised version of the 90°, 1,151 cc V-Twin, all-new chassis, 90° V-Twin with 94 hp (70 kW) and 74 lb⋅ft (100 N⋅m) of torque, revised intake tract, redesigned intake and exhaust ports, an all-new exhaust system, twin spark plugs, lighter pistons and lightweight rods, revised oil system, alternator mounted between the two cylinders, white-faced instruments, optional ABS, two available performance kits to increase power above 100 hp (70 kW). Neither is available in the US.
- MGS-01 Corsa (1,222 cc) (since 2004) (track only): a very limited production racing bike — introduced at Intermot 2002 (Cologne Motorcycle Show) as a prototype. The bike had been designed starting in 2002 with the Moto Guzzi Style Laboratory and a team at Ghezzi & Brian—with co-founder Giuseppe Ghezzi. The MGS-01 features an air-cooled 1,256 cc four-stroke engine with high compression three-segment Cosworth pistons, ceramic-coated cylinders, bushings instead of bearings, upside-down front fork, extra long swinging fork swingarm in box section aluminium, rear single shock absorber vertically located, disc hydraulic drive clutch, one-piece quick-release carbon fiber body design, Brembo brakes with radial mounted calipers, six-speed gearbox (as a structural component of the bike) and shaft drive — weighing in at 423 pounds (192 kg). As a pure racing bike, the MGS-01 Corsa was originally intended for a domestic Italian homologation model, though has since been raced (successfully) also in the US. Production was highly limited, with bikes shipped in special wooden crates carrying a special MGS-01 logo on the outside and a personalized spiral-bound and owners, parts and maintenance manual. Moto Guzzi continues to supply engines to Ghezzi & Brian for their own line of production custom bikes.

== Recent awards and victories ==
- Norge, August 31, 2007: Winner, Granturismo category, "Motorcycle of the Year Awards" by Motociclismo
- California Vintage and Bellagio, August 31, 2007: Cruiser category, second and third after the HD Night Rod, "Motorcycle of the Year Awards" by Motociclismo.
- The 1200 Sport, 2007: 2nd Place, Naked category, German fortnightly “Motorrad.”
- Norge, March 2007, "Granturismo of the Year" by the readers of the weekly "Motosprint" and the monthly "In Moto".
- The 1200 Sport, second place in the Naked Category German fortnightly "Motorrad"
- At Daytona, Gianfranco Guareschi riding a Moto Guzzi MGS-01 Corsa twice won The Formula 1 class of the BOT (Battle of Twins) race on 6 and 7 March 2006.
- MGS-01 Corsa: October 2006: Gianfranco Guareschi, riding a Moto Guzzi MGS01, became Italian Supertwins Champion.

== Historic models ==
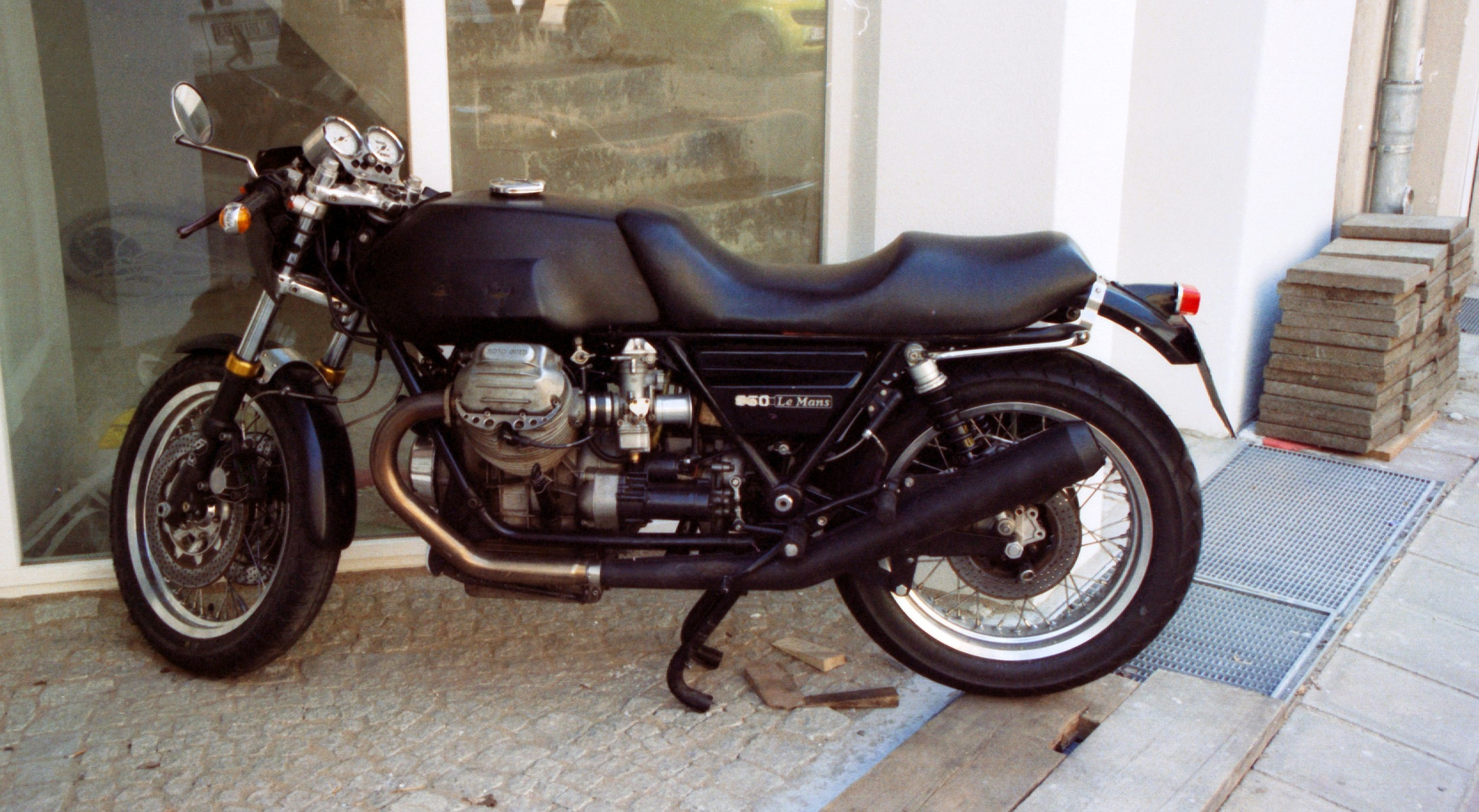
Moto Guzzi V850 Le Mans based cafe racer.

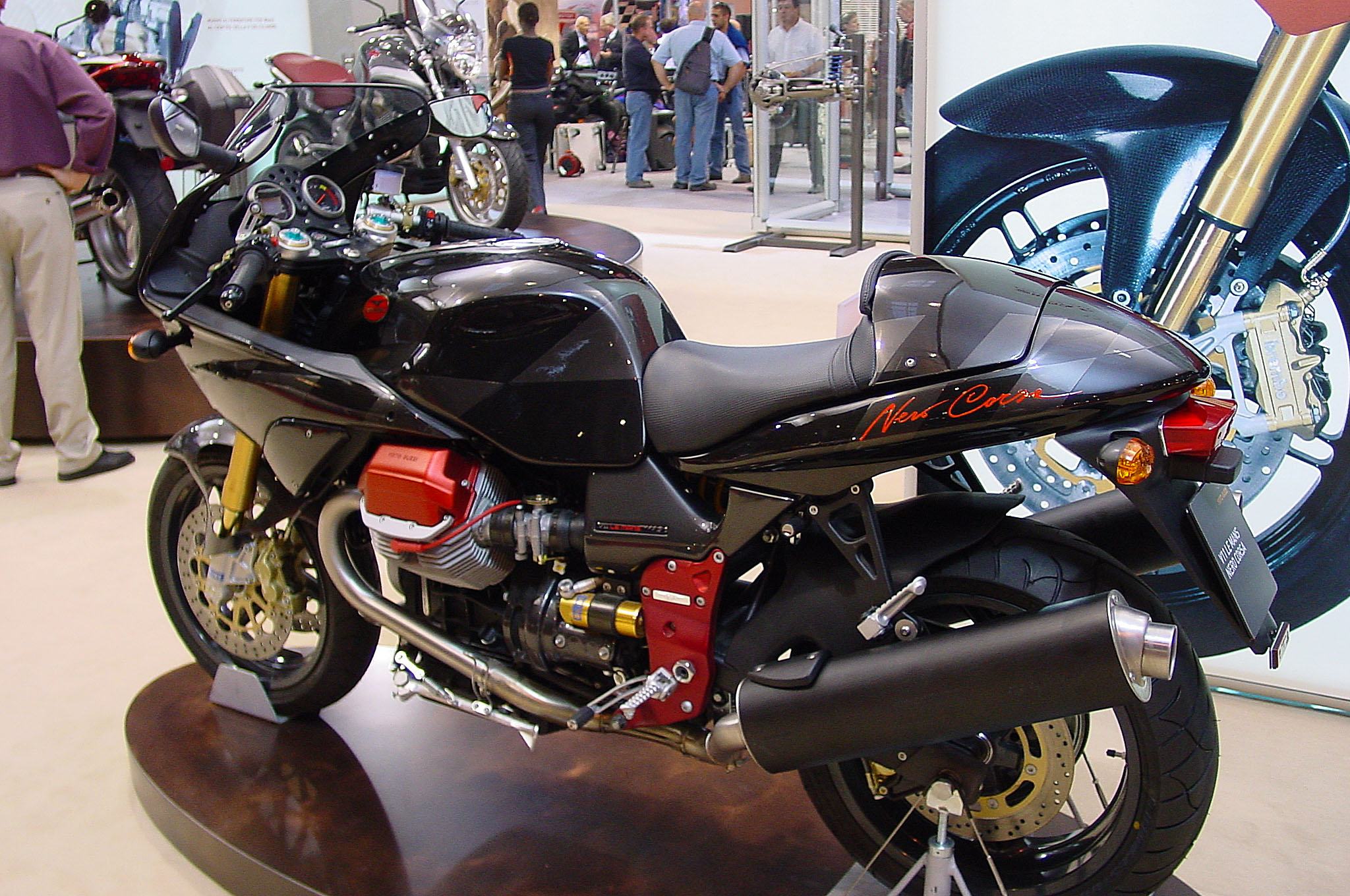
Moto Guzzi V11 Le Mans NeroCorsa

The company has produced over fifty models since its inception. One of its most famous machines has been the Le Mans. This model was a further development of the 1971 750 V7 Sport designed by Guzzi engineer Lino Tonti. The V7 Sport was planned as the first five speed, 200 kg (440 lb), 200 kilometres per hour (120 mph), production motorcycle. It signified a major step forward in the design of a more sporting Guzzi, with a more compact frame being made possible by replacement of the dynamo, sitting high between the cylinders, with an alternator sited on the end of the crank at the front of the engine. The 750S and 750 S3 followed, but it was the 850 Le Mans, with its disc brakes and additional displacement, that lived up to the promise of the V7 Sport and really caught the public's imagination. When the Le Mans debuted in 1976 it was among the 5 best performing road bikes available.

Six versions of the Le Mans have been produced, designated: Le Mans, Le Mans Mk II, Le Mans Mk III, LeMans Mk IV, Le Mans Mk V and V11 Le Mans. The Le Mans, II and III are 850 cc, the IV and V are 1,000 cc and the V11 Le Mans is 1,064 cc. The first two models had rounded air-cooling fins on the barrels while the latter have squared fins (known as "round-fin" and "square-fin"). All models have shaft drive. Early models use 36 mm or 40 mm Dell'Orto carburettors but the late model V11 Le Mans are fuel injected. All the machines in this series are highly regarded for their styling and performance.

Moto Guzzi introduced the California models in 1972, based on the model sold to the Los Angeles Police Department – combining European performance and maneuverability coupled with American styling. The California remained popular throughout the 1980s and 1990s and remains in the US Moto Guzzi range as the California Vintage.

Model	Capacity	Production start	Production end	Note	Image
G.P. 500	498.4 cc	1920		first prototype built before the foundation of the moto guzzi	
Normale	498.4 cc	1921	1924		
Sport	498.4 cc	1923	1928		
GT "Norge"	498.4 cc	1928	1930		
Sport 14	498.4 cc	1929	1930		
Tre Cilindri	499 cc	1932	1933		
GT 16	499 cc	1931	1934		
Sport 15	498.4 cc	1931	1939		
GT 17 500 cc	499 cc	1932	1939		
GTS	498.4 cc	1934	1940		
Alce	498.4 cc	1939	1945		
Egretta	247 cc	1939	1940		
Airone	246 cc	1939	1957		
Motoleggera 65 cc	64 cc	1946	1954		
Superalce	498.4 cc	1948	1958		
Astore	498.4 cc	1949	1953		
Falcone	498.4 cc	1950	1967		
Galletto 160/175/192	159/175/192 cc	1950	1966		
Cardellino 65	65 cc	1954	1956		
Cardellino 73	73 cc	1956	1962		
Cardellino 83	83 cc	1962	1965		
Zigolo	98 cc	1953	1966		
Lodola Sport	175 cc	1956	1966		
Stornello 125/160	123.1/160 cc	1960	1975		
Dingo 3 marce	48.89 cc	1963	1976		
Dingo 4 marce	48.89 cc	1963	1976		
Trotter Special M	48.89 cc	1966	1973		
V7 700cc	703 cc	1967	1977		
V750 Ambassador/V750 Special	757 cc	1968	1972	Early U.S. customization with black painted head covers and chromed forks	
V7 750 Sport	748 cc	1971	1974		
250TS	231cc	1974	1982		
850 T (Interceptor)	844.05 cc	1974	1975		
850 T3	844.05 cc	1975	1979(?)		
850 Eldorado/850GT/California	844 cc	1972	1975		
Nuovo Falcone 500	499 cc	1971	1976		
Le Mans 850	844.05 cc	1975	1978		
850 Le Mans II	844.05 cc	1979	1981		
1000 SP	948.8 cc	1977	1985		
V35	346.2 cc	1977	1980		
V35 II	346.2 cc	1980	1985		
V35 Imola	346.2 cc	1979	1986		
V35 C	346.2 cc	1982	1985		
V35 III	346.2 cc	1984	1986		
V50	490.29 cc	1977	1979		
V50 II	490.29 cc	1979	1980		
V50 Monza	490.29 cc	1980	1985		
V50 III	490.29 cc	1981	1986		
V50 C	490.29 cc	1982	1994		
V1000 I-Convert	948.8 cc	1975	1984		
V1000 G5	948.8 cc	1979	1985		
Le Mans III	844 cc	1981	1984		
California II	948.8 cc	1981	1987		
V65	643.4 cc	1982	1987		
V65 SP	643.4 cc	1982	1987		
V35 Custom	346.2 cc	1982	1987		
850 T5	844.05 cc	1983	1987		
V65 Lario	643.4 cc	1984	1989		
Le Mans 1000	948.8 cc	1985	1991		
California III	948.8 cc	1987	1993		
Mille GT	949 cc	1987	1991		
1000S	949 cc	1989	1993		
Nevada 350	346.2 cc	1991	2001		
Daytona 1000 IE	992 cc	1992	1999		
Quota 1000	948.8 cc	1992	1997		
Strada 750	744 cc	1992	1994		
Strada 1000	949 cc	1992	1994		
1100 Sport	1,064 cc	1995	1997*		
V10 Centauro	992 cc	1996	2001		
Quota 1100 ES	1,064 cc	1998	2001		
V11/V11 Sport/V11 Le Mans	1,064 cc	1998	2006	models: V11; V11 Sport; V11 Sport Naked; V11 Rosso Mandello; V11 Sport CF (North American market); V11 Sport TT (North American market); V11 Sport Scura; V11 Sport Scura R V11 Ballabio; V11 Café Sport; V11 Coppa Italia; V11 Playboy EE (Dutch and Belgian market); V11 Le Mans; V11 Le Mans Tenni; V11 Rosso Corsa; V11 Nero Corsa	Coppa Italia Le Mans
Bellagio	1,151 cc	2007	2014		
Griso 1200 8V	1,151 cc	2007			
Stelvio 1200	1,151 cc	2007			
1200 Sport 4v	1,151 cc	2008			
Breva V1200	1,151 cc	2008	2011		
Stelvio 1200 NTX	1,151 cc	2009			
California Aqulia Nera	1,064 cc	2010			
Nevada 750 Aquila Nera; Nevada 750 Anniversario; Nevada 750 Classic	744 cc	2010			Anniversario Classic
Norge 1200 8v	1,151 cc	2011			
1200 Sport Corsa 8v	1,151 cc	2011			
California 1400 Custom	1,380 cc	2012			
California 1400 Touring	1,380 cc	2013			

- The last year of the 1100 Sport was fuel injected.

== Racing models ==
Model	Capacity	Production start	Production end	Note	Image
C2V	498,4 cc	1922	1923		
C4V	498,4 cc	1924	1927		
250 SS	250 cc	1928	1933		
250 Compressore	250 cc	1938			
GT2VT	500 cc	1931	1934		
Albatros	246,8 cc	1928	1933		Moto Guzzi Albatros, 1945
Cicogna	500 cc	1933			
Bicilindrica	494,8 cc	1933	1951		Moto Guzzi 500 Bicilindrica, 1951
Dondolino	494,8 cc	1945	1951		Moto Guzzi Dondolino, 1945
Gambalunga	497,7 cc	1946	1951		
Gambalunghino	250 cc	1949	1952		
Quattro Cilindri	500 cc	1952	1954		
Bialbero	250 cc	1953	1955		
Bialbero	350 cc	1954	1957		
Otto Cilindri	500 cc V8	1955	1957	(in 1957 Moto Guzzi ceased racing)	
V7 Record	748 cc	1969	1969		Moto Guzzi V7 Record
MGS-01 Corsa	1225 cc	2004			Moto Guzzi MGS-01 Corsa

== Military models ==
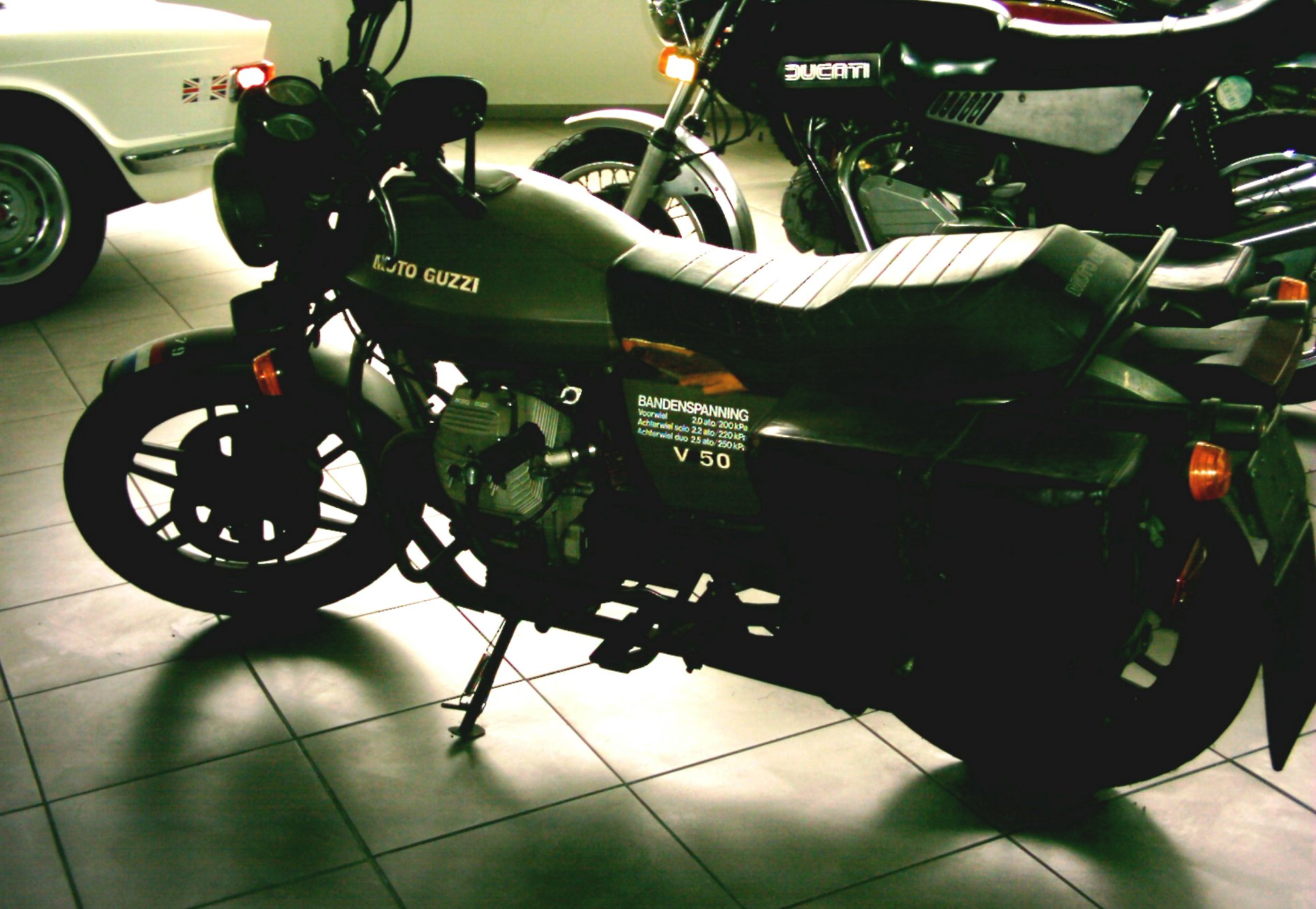
Guzzi V50 militare

- G.T. 17 (500 cc) 1932 - 1939
- G.T. 20 (500 cc) 1938
- Alce (500 cc) 1939 - 1945
- Trialce (500 cc) (motocarro) 1940 - 1943
- Superalce (500 cc) 1946 - 1957
- Falcone militare (500 cc) 1950 - 1967
- Airone militare (250 cc) 1940 - 1957
- Autoveicolo da montagna 3 X 3 (754 cc) 1960 - 1963
- V7 militare (700, 750, 850, 1,100 cc) 1967 - 20..
- Nuovo Falcone militare (500 cc) 1970 - 1976
- V 50 PA (500, 350, 650 cc) 1983 - 20..
- 750 NTX (750 cc) 1990 - 20..
- Breva 750 2006 Municipal Police Model
