= Moto Guzzi Bellagio =

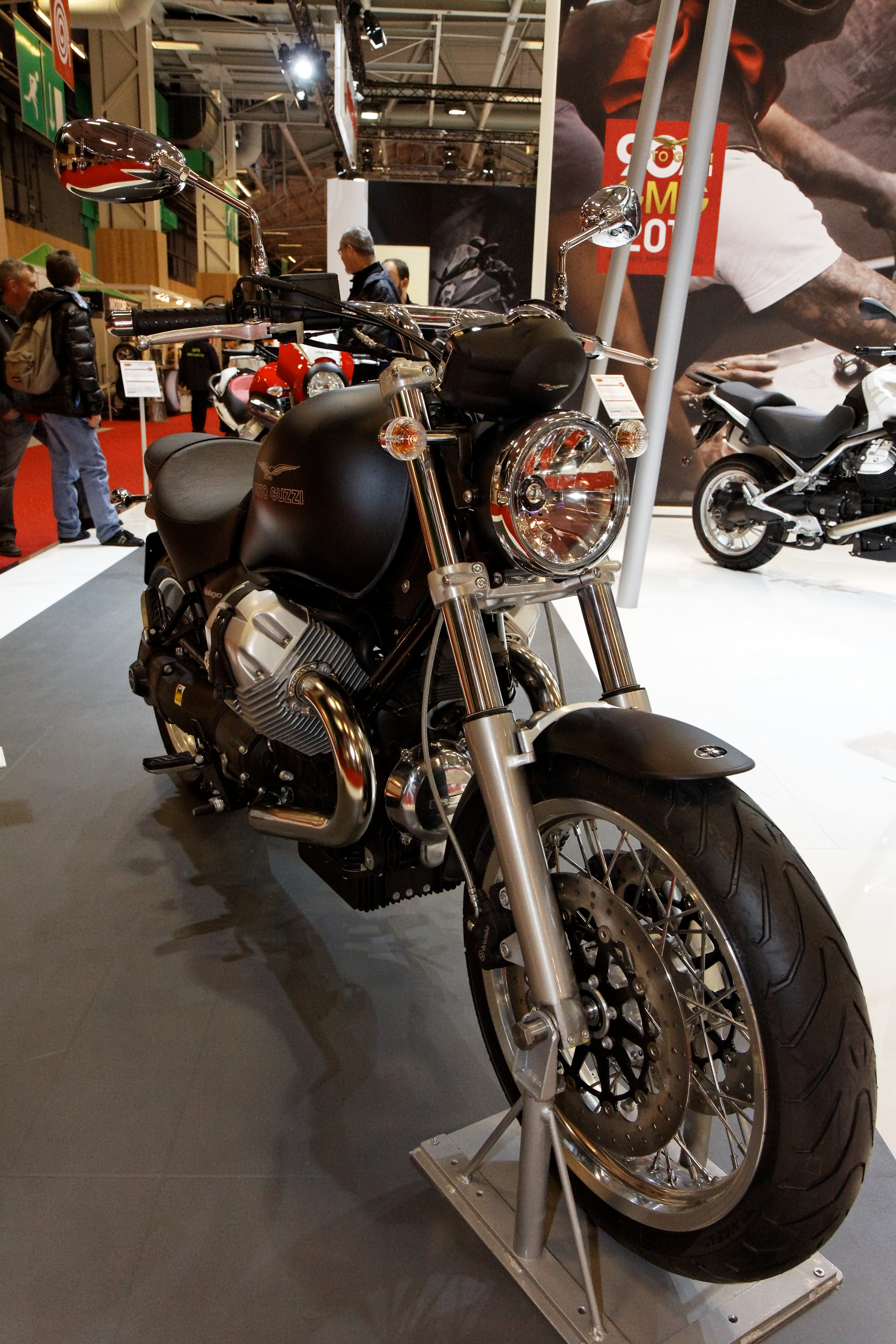
- Manufacturer: Moto Guzzi
- Production: 2007-2014
- Predecessor: Moto Guzzi Nevada
- Successor: Moto Guzzi V9
- Class: Naked
- Engine: OHV 2V/cyl., four-stroke, V-twin
- Transmission: 6-speed, manual, shaft drive
- Suspension: Front: telescopic forks
- Brakes: Front: dual Disc; Rear: disc

The Moto Guzzi Bellagio is a naked bike manufactured and marketed by Moto Guzzi from 2007 until 2014.

== Description ==
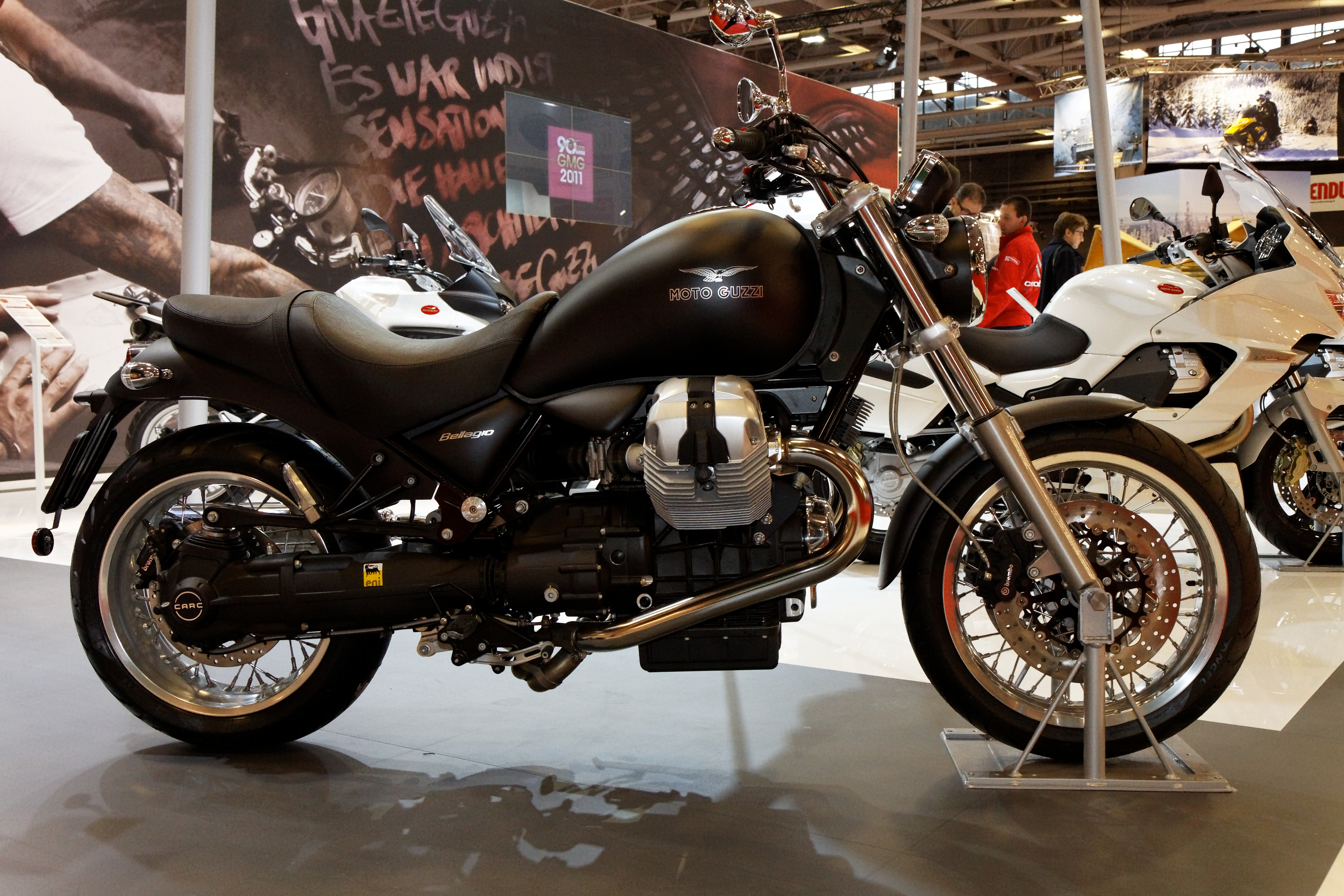

Presented in 2007, like the other Moto Guzzi, the engine is a 90° longitudinal V-twin four-stroke air-cooled engine, which in this case is totally new and has a displacement of 936 cm^{3}. It features two valves per cylinder, controlled by a single camshaft located above the crankshaft and operated via pushrods and rocker arms. Ignition takes place via two spark plugs per cylinder. The alternator is present on the front of the crankshaft. The fuel system is entrusted to a Marelli multipoint indirect electronic injection system coupled to two throttle bodiesfrom 40 mm. Power is around 75 HP.

The dry single-plate clutch is combined with a six-speed gearbox. The transmission is entrusted via a cardan shaft, integrated in the CARC suspension. The front suspension features a 45 mm Marzocchi telescopic fork, while at the rear it uses a CARC single-sided suspension with monoshock. The wheels are Takagaso spokes. There are two 320 mm floating brake discs up front and a single 282 mm disc at the rear.

=== Bellagio 940 Black Eagle ===
A version called Aquila Nera was introduced in 2010, featuring some modifications, richer equipment and black finishes for various components.
