= Quota (disambiguation) =

A quota is a threshold that specifies a desired or allowed quantity of something, often allocating a limited resource.

Quota or The Quota may also refer to:

== Arts and entertainment ==
=== Music ===
- The Quota (Jimmy Heath album) or the title song, 1961
- The Quota (Red Garland album), a 1973 song
- Quota (EP), by Eleventyseven, a 2011 song

=== Other media ===
- Quota (2020 film), an Indian film
- Quota (2024 film), a Dutch animated short film
- Quota (novel), a 2014 novel by Jock Serong

== Other uses ==
- Quota International, a service organization
- Moto Guzzi Quota, a motorcycle brand
