= Moto Guzzi Cardellino =

Cardellino
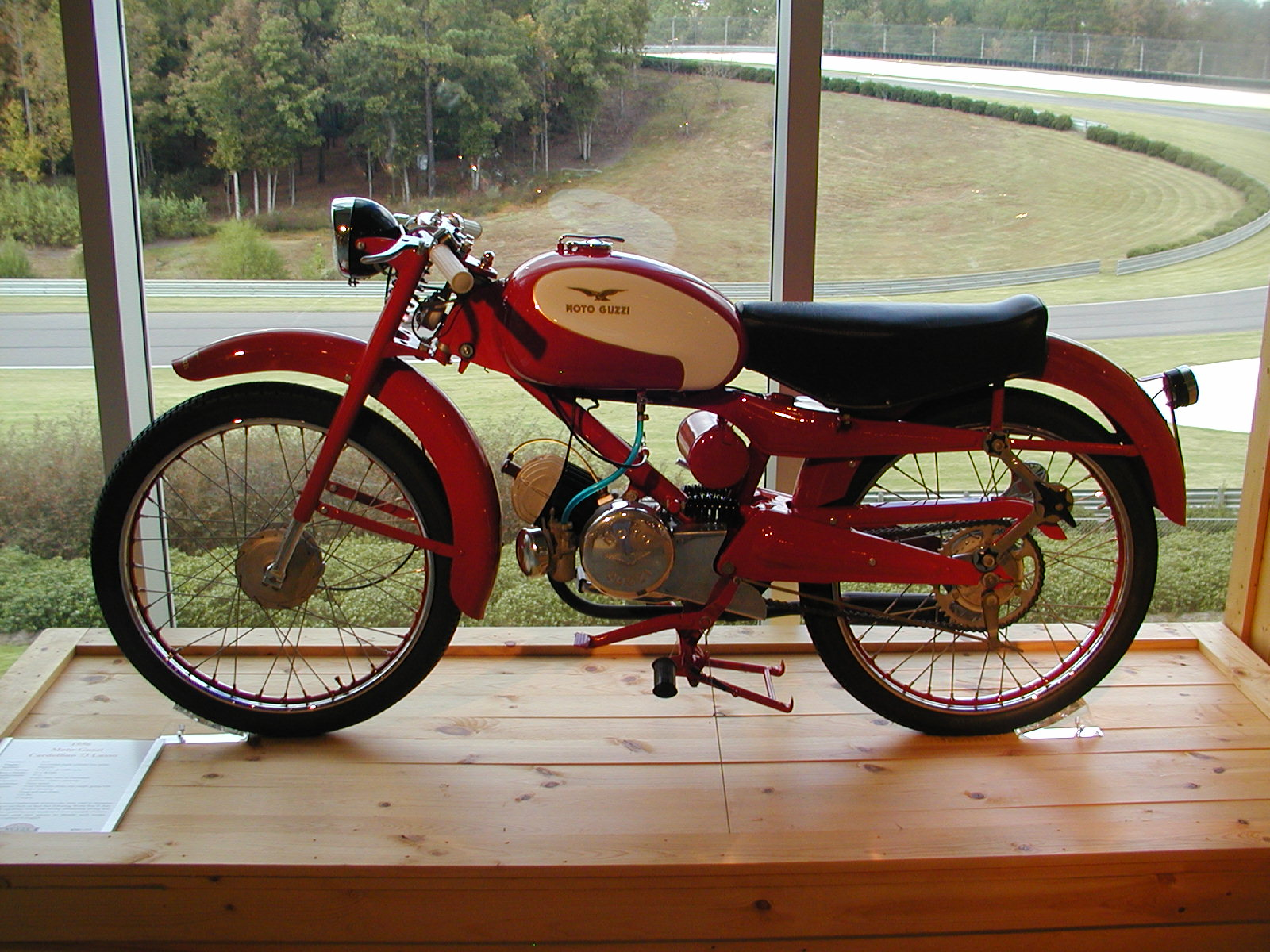
- Manufacturer: Moto Guzzi
- Production: 1954–1962
- Class: Standard
- Engine: 73 cc (4.5 cu in), two-stroke, single,

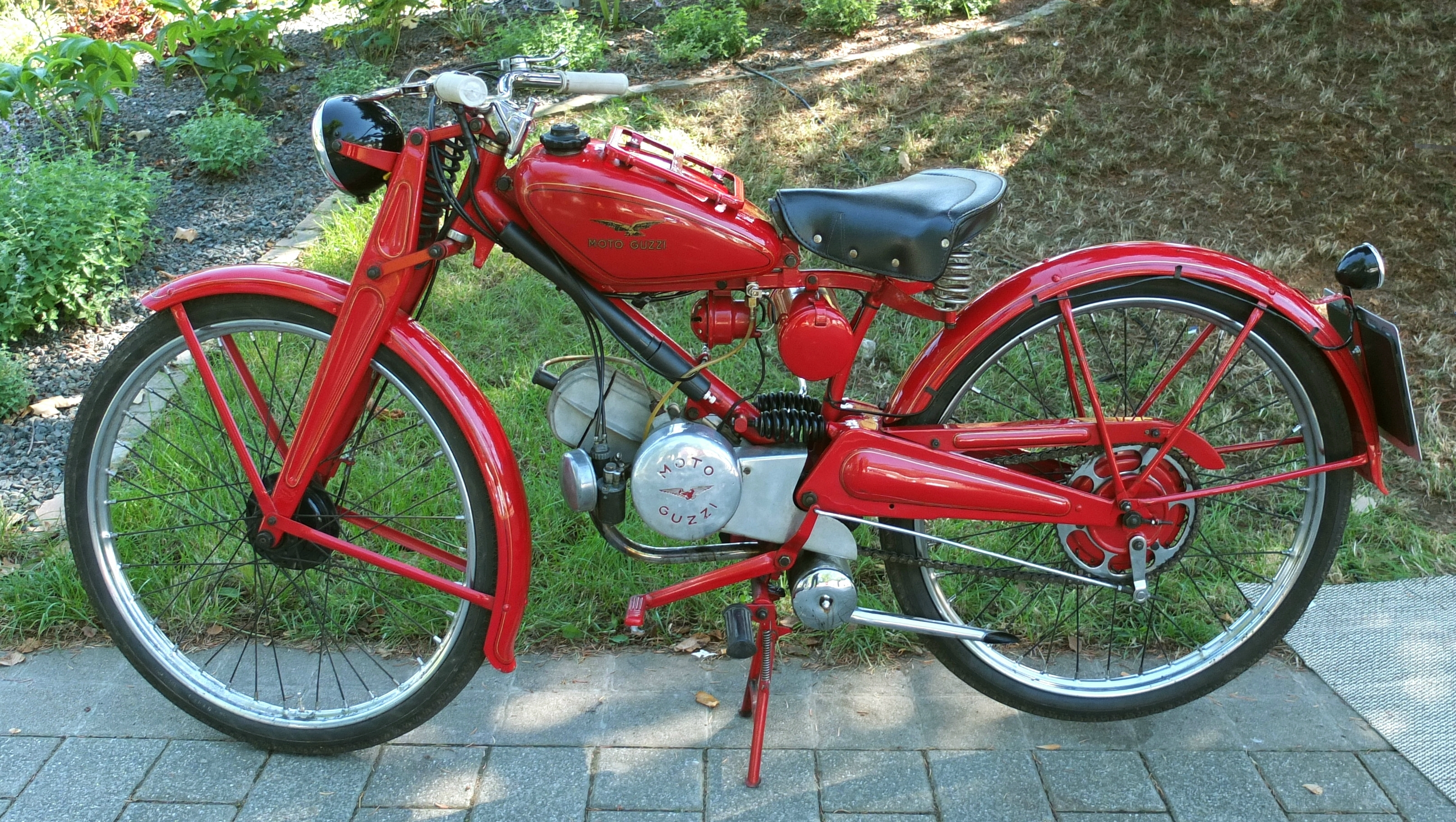
A Motoleggera 65 "Guzzino", predecessor type (1946–1954)

The Cardellino was a small single-cylinder, two-stroke motorcycle produced by Moto Guzzi from 1954 until 1962.

== See also ==
- List of Moto Guzzi motorcycles
- List of motorcycles by type of engine
- List of motorcycles of the 1950s
