= Moto Guzzi Norge =

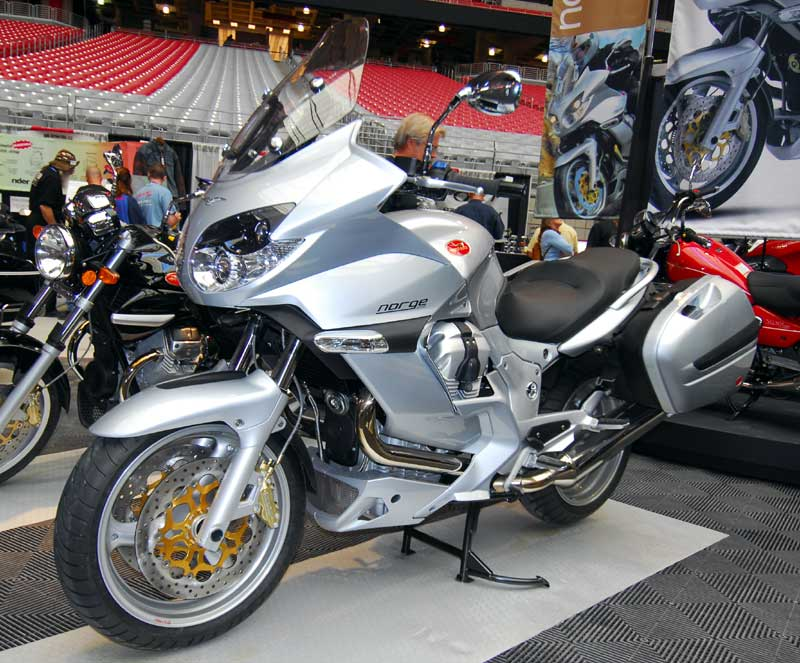
- Manufacturer: Moto Guzzi
- Production: 2006–2016
- Successor: Moto Guzzi V100 Mandello
- Class: Touring
- Engine: DOHC 2V/cyl., four-stroke, V-twin
- Transmission: 6-speed, manual, shaft drive
- Suspension: Front: telescopic forks Rear: Single-sided swingarm
- Brakes: Front: double Disc; Rear: single disc
- Related: Moto Guzzi Breva

The Moto Guzzi Norge is a touring motorcycle manufactured and marketed by Moto Guzzi from 2006 to 2016.

The name recalls the Moto Guzzi GT Norge from the 1920s.

== Description ==
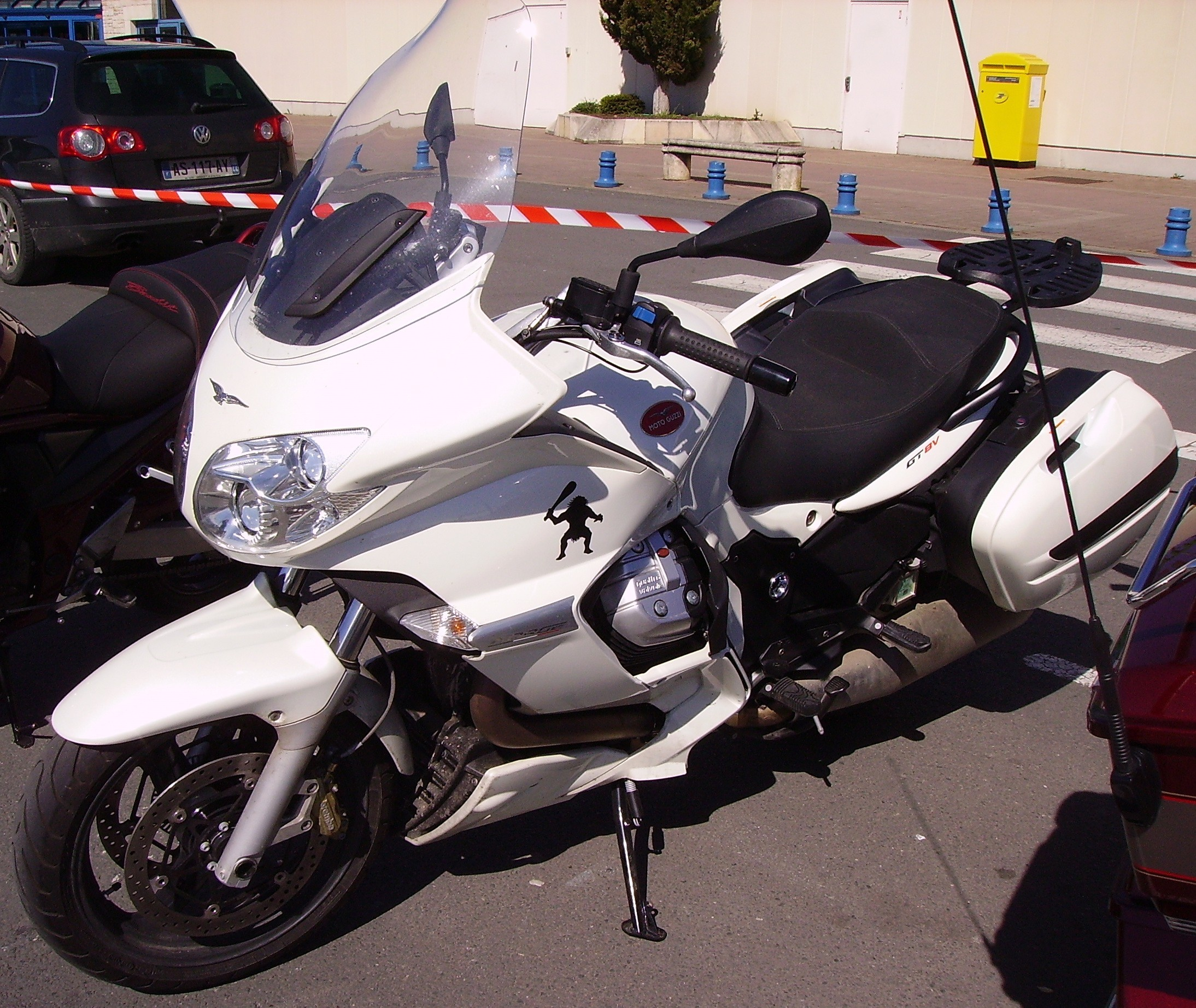
Restyling

Presented in November 2005 on EICMA, has been producing this motorcycle since 2006 in the version equipped with a 1200 cm^{3} engine and from the following year with the 850 cm^{3} engine. It derives from the Moto Guzzi Breva, the main differences are a large front fairing that covers part of the engine and ensures protection from the wind, a tip to divert the air flow from the engine base and two other small fairings placed on the sides of the bike. The 1200 version has the ABS system as standard for braking assistance in the event of slippery ground. The engine is Moto Guzzi style, air-cooled transverse V-twin cylinder with 90° inclinationand a small radiator for cooling the engine oil. The final transmission is via a Moto Guzzi patented CARC compact reactive cardan shaft, which optimizes performance by reducing the lifting effect typical of motorcycles equipped like the previous versions.

The Norge was elected bike of the year in 2007 and 2008 in the Tourer sector.

== Restyling 2010 ==
During 2010 Moto Guzzi presents the new model equipped with a new fairing, the new version is equipped with a new exhaust system covered in aluminum and the ground clearance is increased; The engine is new, now with 4 valves per cylinder and approved to Euro 3 anti-pollution legislation with increased power and driving torque.

As standard, the bike now has ABS which can be completely disabled, the on-board computer with lots of information in addition to fuel consumption, travel time and the ability to check the charge status via a digital voltmeter, heated grips adjustable to three heat levels and a new electrically adjustable windshield, the side bags, which are also standard compared to the old ones, are redesigned and seals inserted to prevent water from entering. The optional rear top case has a new shape and increased capacity.

As accessories, you can request a satellite navigator, a gel saddle and a lowered saddle, the electronic anti-theft device.
