= Benelli 250 2C =

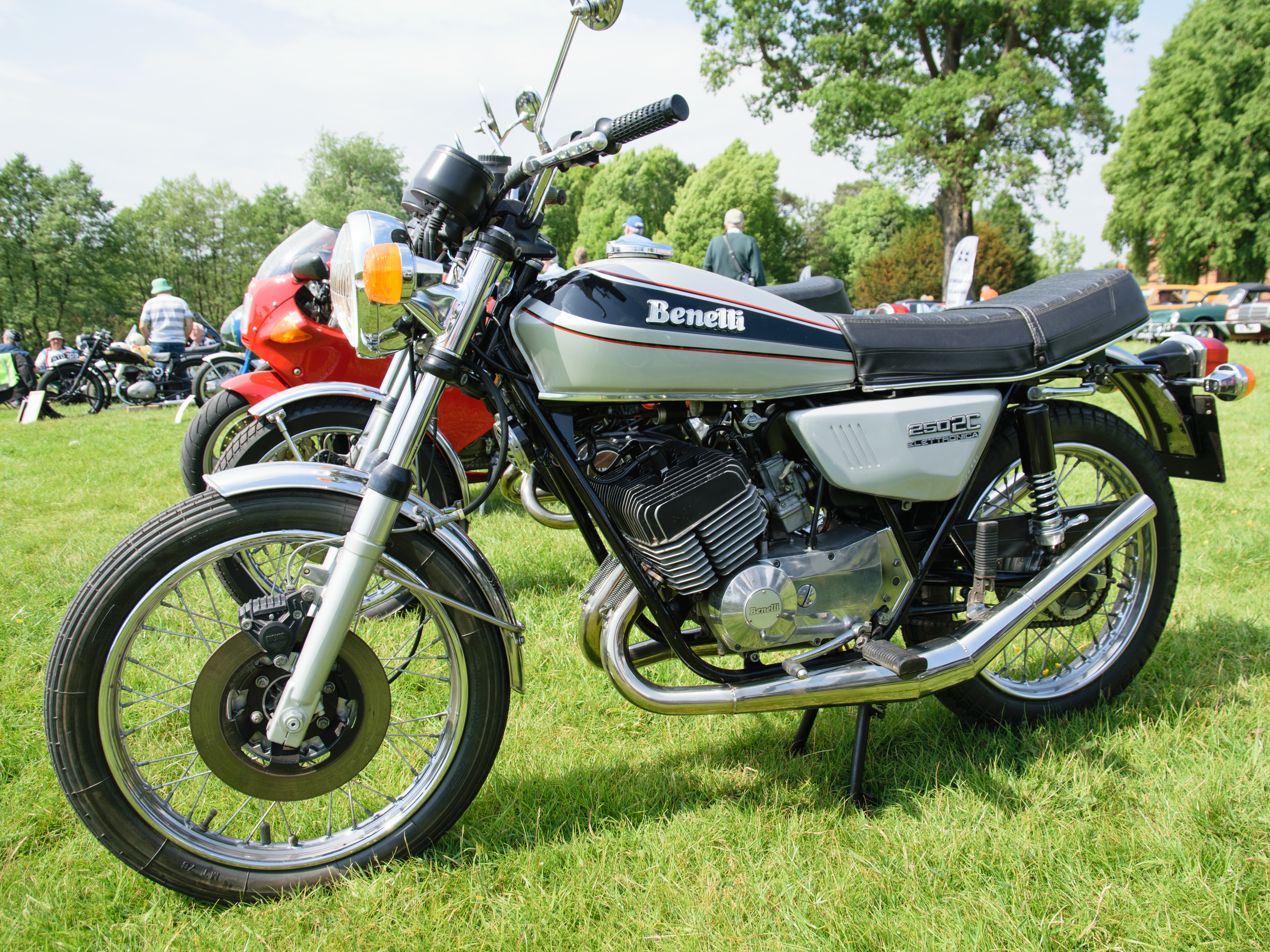
- 1980 Benelli 250 2C Elettronica
- Manufacturer: Benelli
- Production: 1973-1988
- Assembly: Pesaro, Italy
- Engine: 231 cc (14.1 cu in) two stroke air cooled parallel twin
- Bore / stroke: 55 mm × 47 mm (2.2 in × 1.9 in)
- Compression ratio: 10:1
- Top speed: 150 km/h (93 mph)
- Power: 24 bhp (18 kW) @ 7,500 rpm
- Torque: 23 N⋅m (17 lbf⋅ft) @ 7,000 rpm
- Transmission: Wet clutch, 5 speed, chain drive
- Frame type: Duplex cradle
- Suspension: Front: telescopic forks Rear swinging arm
- Brakes: Drum 188 mm (7.4 in) twin sided front, 158 mm (6.2 in) rear
- Tyres: 300x18 front, 325x18 rear
- Wheelbase: 1,320 mm (52 in)
- Weight: 134 kg (295 lb) (wet)
- Fuel capacity: 12.5 L (2.7 imp gal; 3.3 US gal)

The Benelli 250 2C is a 250 cc (15 cu in) two-stroke, twin-cylinder motorcycle manufactured by the Italian Benelli company from 1973 to 1988. It was also badge-engineered as the MotoBi 250 2C (Note: The Benelli company was formed in 1911 by the six Benelli brothers. Following WW2 the factory was in ruins and the two oldest brothers, Giuseppe and Giovanni, disagreed over the future of the company leading to Giovanni leaving and starting his own company, MotoBi. Following Giuseppe's death in 1959 relations within the family improved and the two companies merged in late 1961.) and the Moto Guzzi 250 TS. Although marketed as a 250, the actual capacity was 231 cc (14.1 cu in) which allowed it to fall into a lower tax bracket in its native Italy (Note: Motorcycles with a displacement of above 232 cc were subject to a luxury tax in Italy at the time.) and in France. (Note: At the time VAT (Taxe sur la valeur ajoutée) in France was 33% on motorcycles larger than 240 cc (15 cu in).) In total 27,000 machines were produced, 12,000 of which were Moto Guzzi versions.

== History ==
German two-stroke specialist Peter Dürr joined Benelli from Aermacchi in 1969 and began designing new 125 and 250cc two stroke twins, which appeared to be influenced by the Suzuki and Yamaha 250s. The twins were seen on public roads around the Pesaro factory in 1971 bring ridden by factory testers. Racing versions were also being developed. The 250 was unveiled to the public at the 1972 Milan Motorcycle Show and went on sale in early 1973. Although down on power compared to its Japanese competitors, it weighed 20 kg (44 lb) less and handled much better.

Many of the components for the model were brought in. The frame was made by Benelli Armi, the forks, yokes and rear suspension units were from Marzocchi, brakes from Grimeca, silencers from Silentium and wiring harness and switchgear from Aprilia.

CDI was offered as an extra and models fitted with it were designated 2CE.

Argentine industrialist Alejandro de Tomaso acquired Benelli in September 1971. De Tomaso also acquired Moto Guzzi in late 1972 and merged the two companies. A Moto Guzzi version of the bike, the 250 TS, was introduced in 1974. It was fitted with alloy cylinders with chromed liners.

CDI became a standard fitment in 1975 and Elettronica added to the model designation. A single Brembo disc replaced the double sided front drum brake in 1976. Bikes fitted with the disc brake are sometimes referred to as Mark 2 models.

A cafe racer version was introduced in the early 1980s with 3 spoke cast wheels, triple discs and a combined tank and seat unit.

Production of the Moto Guzzi version ended in 1982 and production of the 2C ended in 1988 along with all other Benelli models when Guzzi Benelli Moto SpA was formed and Benelli's Pesaro factory was sold.

== Sales ==
Sales outside Italy and Spain were poor, possibly due to lack of oil injection (Note: At the model's launch it was intended to upgrade to oil injection at a later date.) and the value of the Lira at the time.

In Italy, following lobbying of the Italian Government by de Tomaso, the import of Japanese motorcycles under 350 cc (21 cu in) was prohibited. The 2C was faster than locally produced machines and imported Spanish single cylinder machines so sold well. There were also numerous scooters in the country which used petrol/oil mix and petrol station were equipped to dispense petrol/oil mix in various ratios so the lack of oil injection was less of a problem.

In Spain, where there was a prohibition of importing Japanese motorcycles, the model sold well against the Spanish single cylinder bikes from OSSA, Bultaco and Montesa. The bikes were imported by Moto Guzzi Hispania until they split from the Italian company in 1979. Various companies imported the bike after that but principally Lezauto. There were also plans for Motor Hispania to manufacture the bikes in Spain but this was never realised.

In the UK there were a number of bikes that had electrical problems and failure of the left hand big end. Faced with many warranty claims, the importer handed back the franchise.

In the US the bike was marketed as the Benelli Phantom.

== Moto Guzzi 250TS ==
De Tomaso had purchased Benelli in late 1971 and a year later Moto Guzzi. To streamline production and reduce costs he decided to use the same platform across the two brands. The Guzzi version of the 250 was to be better specified and more upmarket than the Benelli version. The engine was updated with alloy cylinders and larger 25 mm (0.98 in) Dell'Orto carburettors which raised power 5bhp to 30 bhp (22 kW). The bike was restyled and fitted with a larger tank and side panels from the Guzzi vtwins.

== Technical details ==
=== Engine and transmission ===
The 2C's engine was a 180° piston ported two stroke twin was of unit construction and had an alloy head and cast iron barrels. Bore and stroke were 54 mm × 47 mm (2.1 in × 1.9 in) and the claimed power output was 24 bhp (18 kW) @ 7,500 rpm.

Fuel was delivered by twin 22 mm (0.87 in) Dell'Orto carburettors.

The Moto Guzzi version was fitted with alloy cylinders with chrome-plated bores and 25 mm (0.98 in) carburettors. This raised power to 30 bhp (22 kW) @ 8,000 rpm.

Primary drive was by helical gears to a multi-plate wet clutch. The five speed gearbox had, unusually for Italian machines, the gear change on the left. Chain drive took power to the rear wheel.

=== Cycle parts ===
The frame of the 2C was a duplex cradle. Rear suspension was by swinging arm with twin shock absorbers. At the front telescopic forks were used. Front and rear suspension was supplied by Marzocchi.

Brakes were Grimeca drums front and rear, the front being double-sided. In 1976 a Brembo disc brake was fitted to the front wheel. The spoked wheels were fitted with 300 x 18 front and 325 x 18 rear tyres.

== Notes and references ==
=== Bibliography ===
- Aynsley, Phil (11 July 2019). "Moto Guzzi 250 TS two-stroke twin". MCNews.
- Burgaleta, Pepe (29 December 2014). "Moto clásica: Benelli 250 2c Elettronica" [Classic motorcycle: Benelli 250 2c Elettronica]. Motociclismo (in Spanish).
- Lancaster, Mark (5 July 2023). "Cost-Effective Classics: Benelli 2C and Moto Guzzi 250TS | MoreBikes". morebikes.co.uk.
- Martin, Javi (3 March 2025). "Moto del día: Benelli 250 2C" [Motorcycle of the day: Benelli 250 2C]. espíritu RACER moto (in Spanish).
- Parkington, Rick (25 June 2025). "Benelli 2C Mk2". Classic Bike.
- Perelli, Carlo (May 1971). "Report From Italy". Cycle World.
- Perelli, Carlo (March 1973). "Report From Italy". Cycle World.
- Siemer, Fred (11 June 2015). "Kultbike Benelli 250-2C". Motorrad (in German).
- Scaysbrook, Jim (21 February 2020). "The Benelli Brigade". Old Bike Australasia.
- Varta, Nick (6 June 2025). "MotoBi – A family affair". Old Bike Australasia.
- "Benelli 2 C 1973 - Moto Passion - Moto Collection François-Marie DUMAS". www.moto-collection.org.
- "Benelli 250 2C - Motos clásicas de los 70, 80 y 90". www.motosclasicas80.com (in Spanish).
- "Benelli 250-2C, Modell Bj. 1974" [Benelli 250-2C, model year 1974]. zweitakte.de (in German).
- "Prueba Moto Guzzi 250 TS, la RD europea, el patito feo de Mandello del Lario" [Test Moto Guzzi 250 TS, the European RD, the ugly duckling of Mandello del Lario]. Mundo Deportivo (in Spanish). 23 September 2023.
