= Moto Guzzi V100 Mandello =

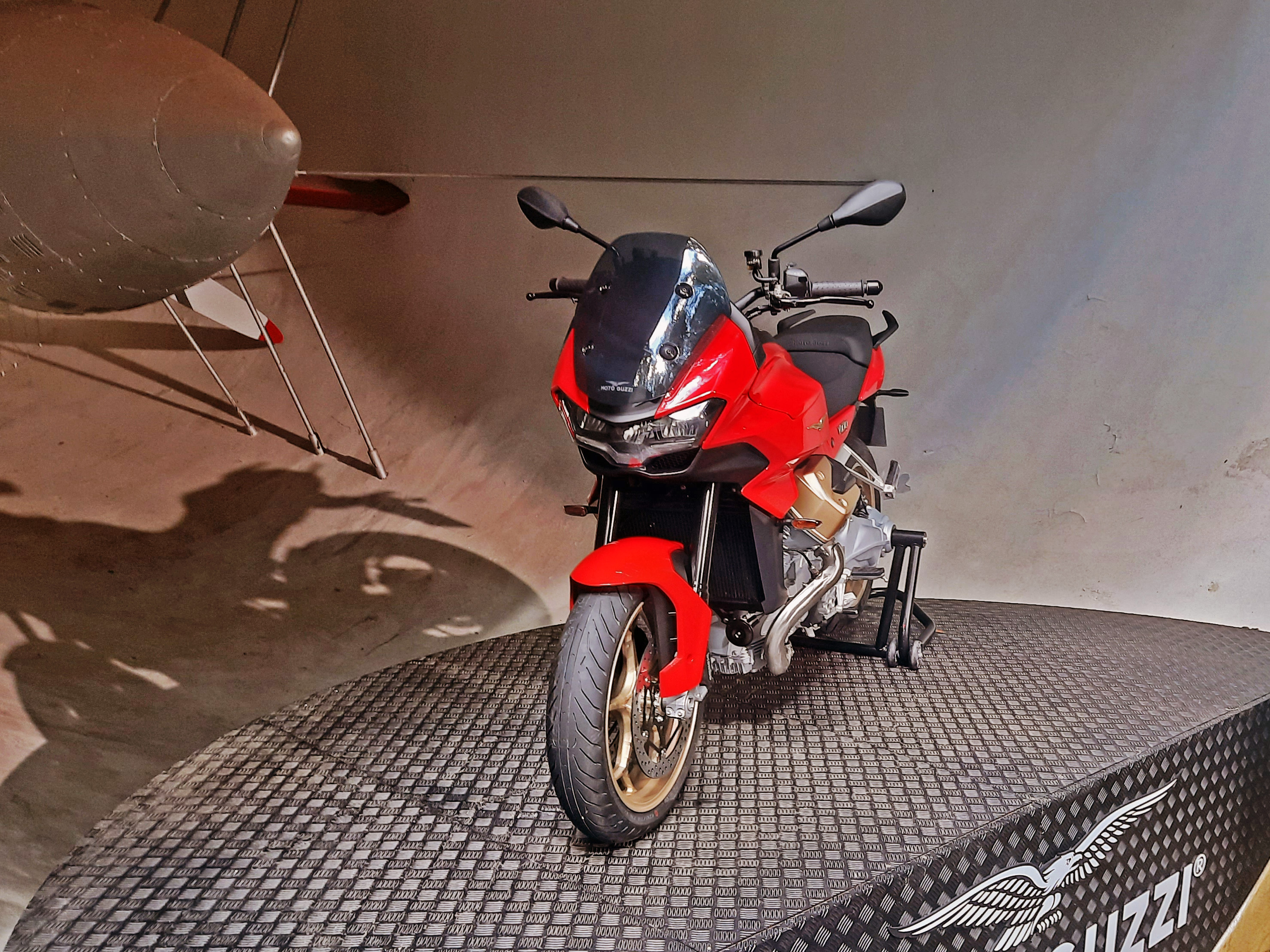
- Manufacturer: Moto Guzzi
- Production: 2022-
- Assembly: Mandello del Lario
- Class: sport touring
- Engine: 1,042 cc (63.6 cu in) DOHC 4V/cyl., four-stroke, 90° V-twin
- Bore / stroke: 96 mm × 72 mm (3.8 in × 2.8 in)
- Power: 116 hp (87 kW) @ 8,800 rpm
- Torque: 105 N⋅m (77 lb⋅ft) @ 6,750 rpm
- Transmission: 6-speed, manual, shaft drive
- Suspension: Front: telescopic forks Rear: Single-sided swingarm
- Brakes: Front: double Disc; Rear: single disc
- Wheelbase: 58.1 in (1,480 mm)
- Weight: 514 lb (233 kg) (wet)
- Fuel capacity: 17 L (3.7 imp gal; 4.5 US gal)

The Moto Guzzi V100 Mandello is a sport touring motorcycle manufactured and marketed by Moto Guzzi since 2022.

== Description ==
Built in Mandello del Lario since 2022, the bike was announced in September 2021 and presented on 23 November 2021 at the 78th edition of EICMA in Milan.

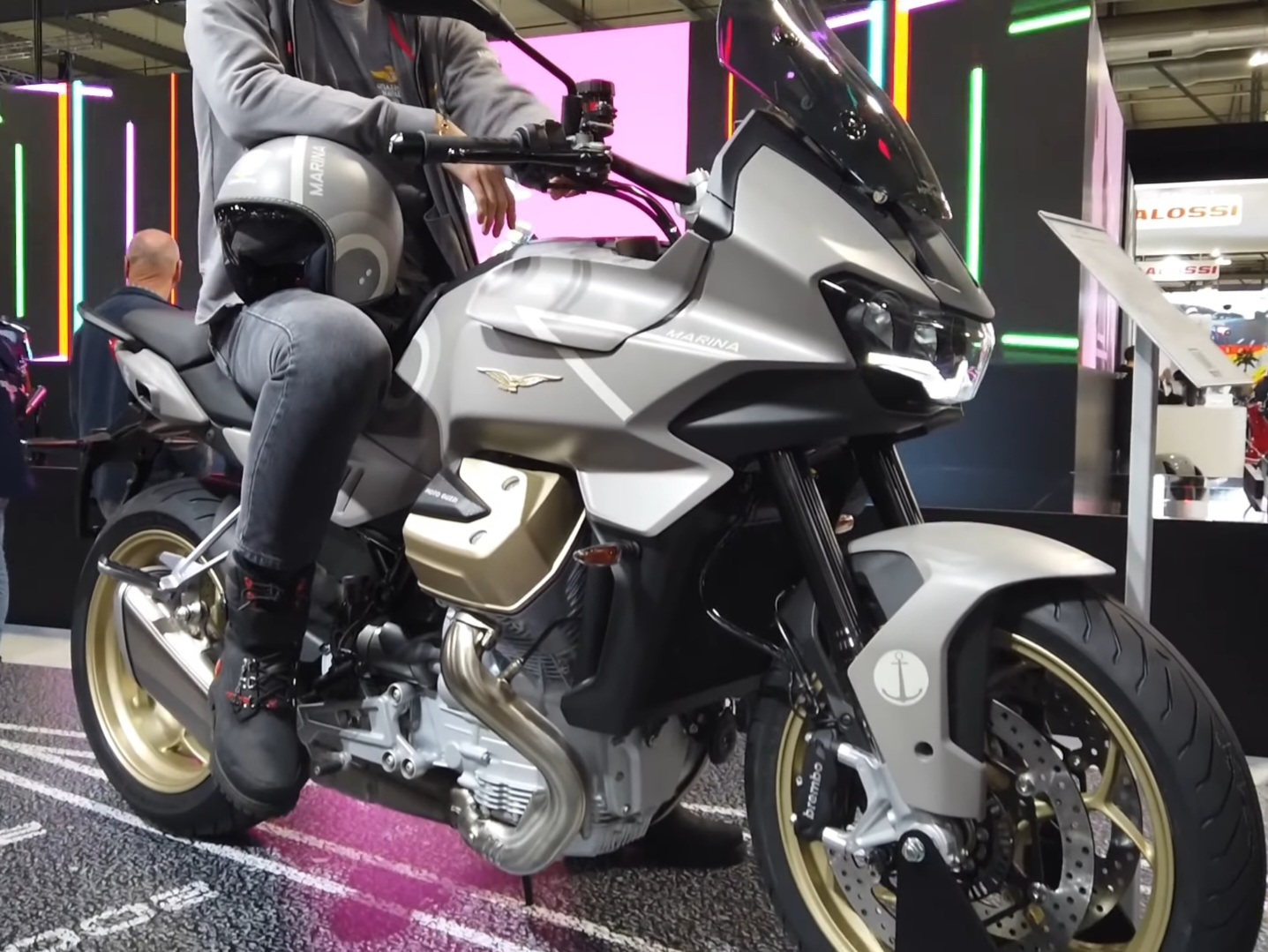

The name "V100" hints at both its displacement of ca. 1000 cm^{3} and the manufacturer's 100th anniversary, celebrated in 2021. "Mandello", from Mandello del Lario, refers to the location of the company's headquarters and its sole manufacturing facility.

The V100 Mandello is the first Moto Guzzi with a liquid-cooled engine and it is the first production motorcycle to introduce a system with adaptive aerodynamics, consisting of a device equipped with aerodynamic wings with electronic adjustment according to the speed placed on the side fairing (the so-called "flaps") which, by opening or closing, improve the aerodynamics of the bike; moreover, this system also manages the windscreen, which rises and falls according to the speed. The standard equipment includes full LED lighting including daytime running lights and turning lights, an instrument panel with a five-inch TFT color display and the Moto Guzzi MIA multimedia platform with smartphone connection interface.

The engine, a liquid-cooled four stroke V-twin mounted longitudinally with 90° cylinder banks and a displacement of 1042 cm^{3}, is new, with a power of 85 kW (116 HP) at 8800 rpm and a maximum torque of 105 Nm at 6750 rpm. It features four valves per cylinder, controlled by a chain-driven double overhead camshaft. Power to the engine is via an electronic indirect fuel injection system, with the air intake being controlled by a throttle bodycontrol unit also electronically operated (so-called "ride by wire"), allowing for different response settings. Power is transmitted to the rear wheel via a six-speed manual gearbox and shaft drive.

The V100 Mandello has a steel trellis frame and uses the engine as a load-bearing element. The front suspension features an Öhlins electronically controlled upside-down telescopic fork, with four driving modes that act on its stiffness and damping capacity. At the rear, the single-sided aluminum swingarm – positioned for the first time on a Moto Guzzi on the left side – is assisted by a lateral single shock absorber. The braking system consists of double hydraulically actuated semi-floating Brembo discs with radially bolted four-piston fixed calipers; at the rear, there is instead a twin-piston floating caliper with single disc, also hydraulically actuated. ABS with six-axis sensor is available as standard, a novelty for Moto Guzzi.
