= Moto Guzzi NTX =

Motorcycle by Moto Guzzi from 1986 to 1995

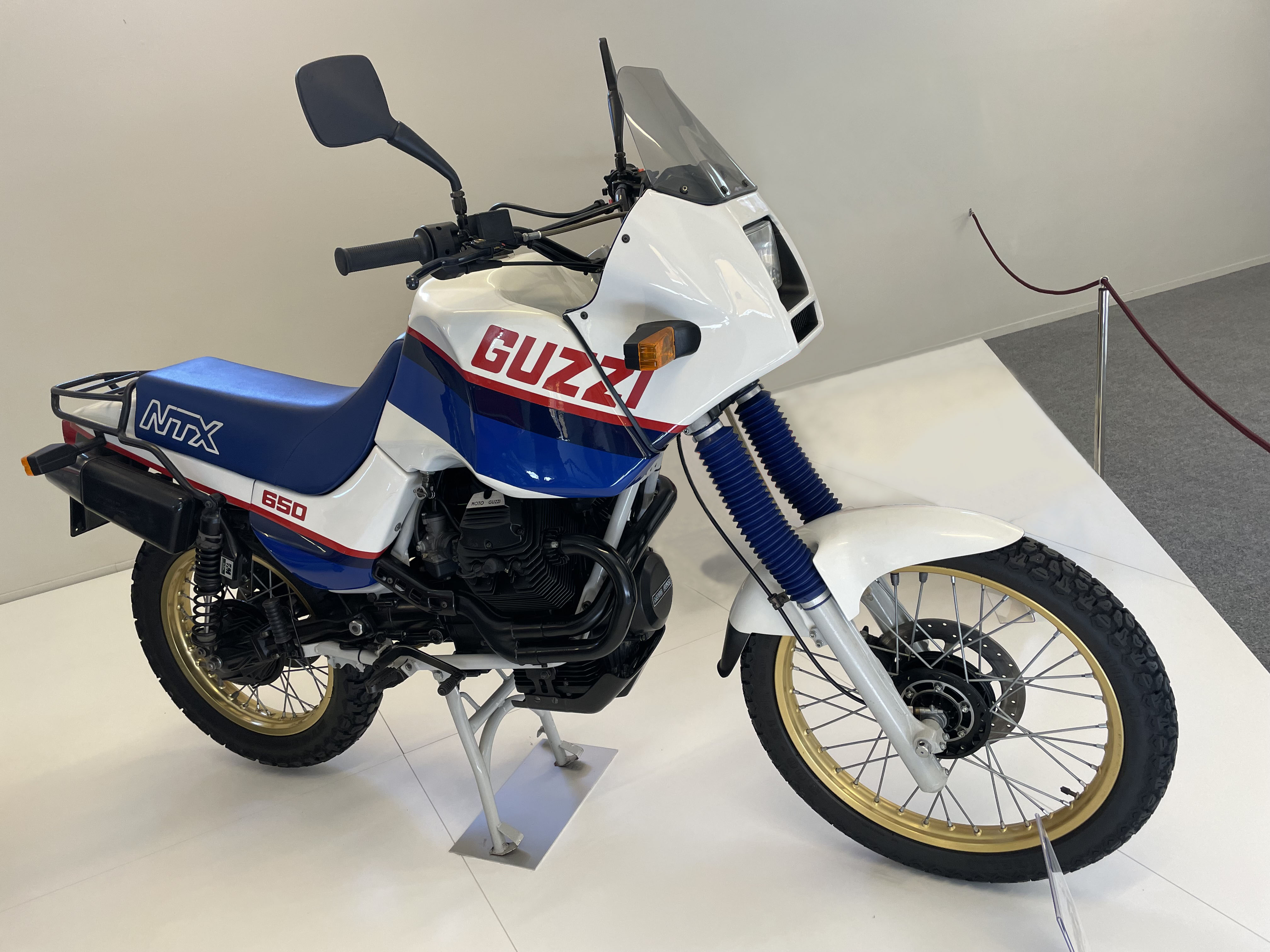
- Manufacturer: Moto Guzzi
- Production: 1986–1995
- Predecessor: Moto Guzzi V65 TT
- Successor: Moto Guzzi Quota
- Class: Enduro
- Engine: OHV 2V/cyl., four stroke, V-twin
- Transmission: 5-speed, manual, shaft drive
- Suspension: Front: telescopic forks
- Brakes: Front: disc Rear: drum

The Moto Guzzi NTX is an enduro-style motorcycle manufactured and marketed by Moto Guzzi from 1986 to 1995.

== Description ==
Presented at the Cologne Show in September 1986 and launched in 1987 it was equipped with an air-cooled, four-stroke 90° V-twin engine, installed longitudinally, with two valves for cylinder timing controlled with a camshaft located in the block and tappets actuated by pushrods and rocker arms. Fuel was supplied by two Dell'Orto carburettors. The NTX had a mechanically operated single-plate dry clutch mated to a five-speed gearbox. The transmission transfers power to the rear wheel via a cardan shaft located in the right swingarm. The frame was a tubular steel double cradle.

The 21" front wheel is anchored to a non-adjustable Marzocchi telescopic fork with a stem diameter of 40mm and travel of 210mm. On the 18" rear wheel there is an aluminum double-sided swingarm with spring-shock absorber units with external reservoirs, adjustable in 5 positions.

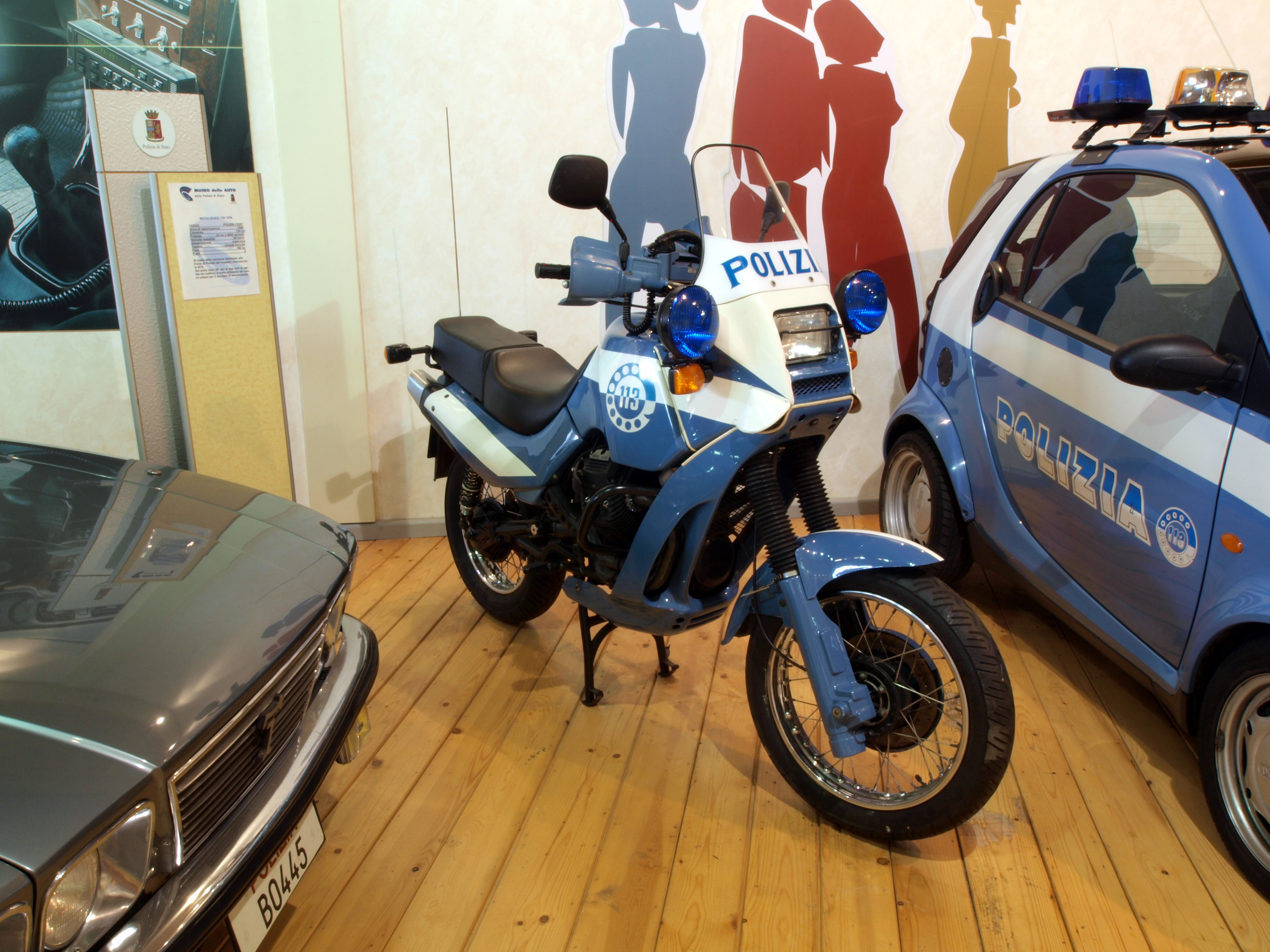
NTX Italian Police version

The front and rear wheels each have hydraulically actuated single disc brakes with two-piston fixed calipers. The diameter of both brake discs is 260mm. The 750's front braking system is fully enclosed.

It was initially available only in 350 cc (21 cu in) and 643 cc (39.2 cu in) displacements. In 1988 both were debuted the 750 variant with the 743.9 cc (45.40 cu in) engine, which had already been presented to Milan Show.

Based on the NTX 750, the 750 Police version, designated X Publicca Amministrazione (X PA), painted in blue and white was set up, built for the Italian State Police. This version differed in the small wheels (18″ front and 16″ rear), double flashing blue light and fixed side panniers.

The 350 was created for the Italian domestic market, but NTX wasn't exported the on UK because it was in effect at the time a ban for plastic fuel tank motorcycle (which was also one of the motorcycle's particular characteristics of NTX).

It was considered among the ugliest modern motorcycles produced.
