= Moto Guzzi Nevada =

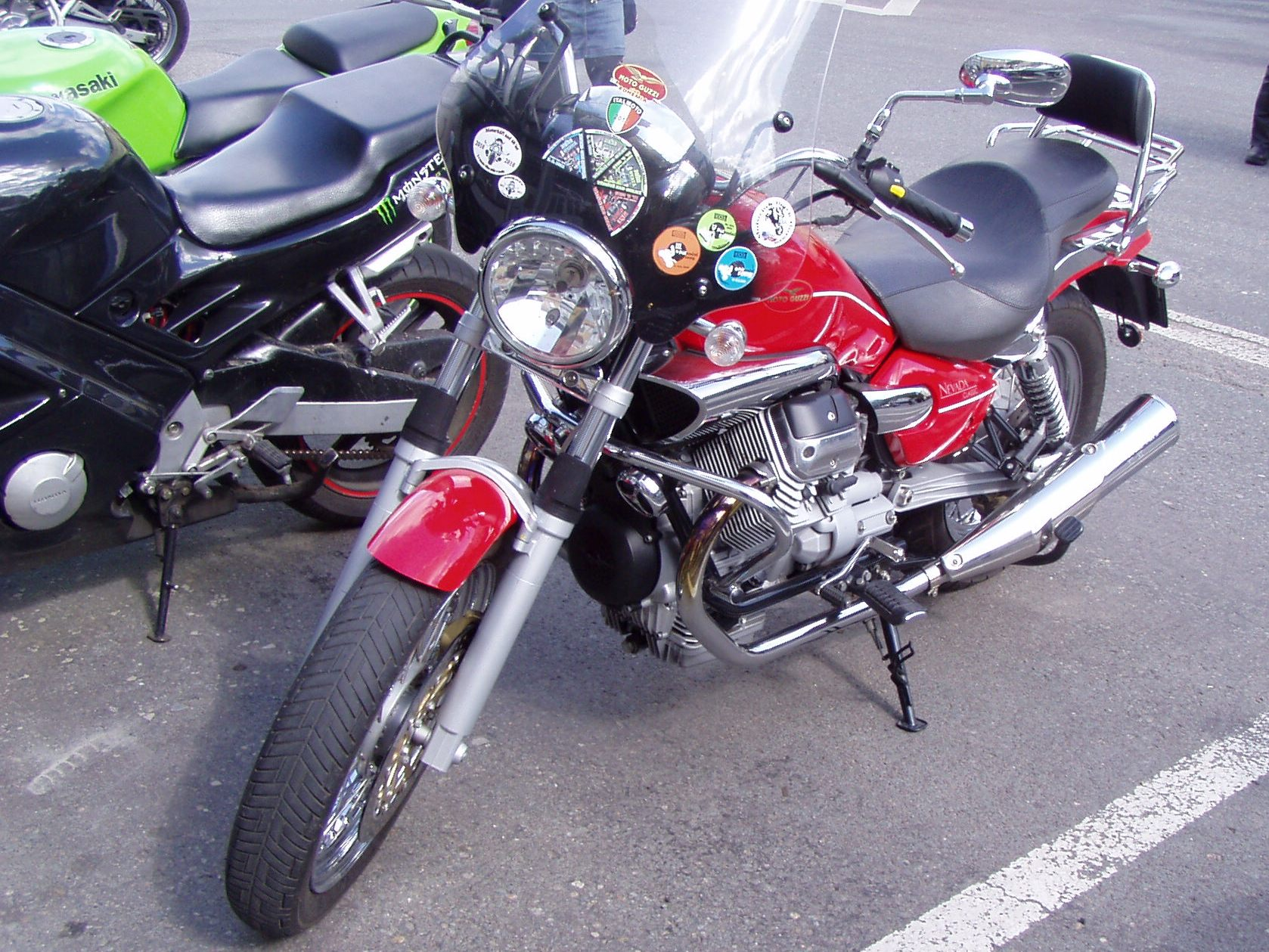
- Manufacturer: Moto Guzzi
- Production: 1991–2016
- Successor: Moto Guzzi V9
- Class: cruiser

The Moto Guzzi Nevada is a series of cruiser motorcycles manufactured and marketed by Moto Guzzi. It was built under the model names Nevada 350 and Nevada 750 from 1991 to 2016.

== History ==
The origin of the Nevada is the V35 Florida. It was developed as a cheap motorcycle with a displacement of 350 cm^{3}. The basic version had no extras. However, these could be added at an additional cost.

For commercial and marketing reasons, it was decided to give a new name after a US state. After California and Florida came Nevada in 1991. The new V35 was thus given a facelift that allowed the model to last into the 2010s and become the best-selling custom motorcycle in Italy. A year later, the Nevada 750 followed, a version with a well-known 744 cm^{3} engine.

Production of the 350cc was discontinued in 1999. In 2002, a restyling with important changes followed. The model shares most of the components with the Breva 750 introduced a year later. The air-cooled V2 engine still has a displacement of 744 cm^{3} and delivers 36 kW (48 hp) at 6800 rpm. It is equipped with electronic injection, regulated catalyst and lambda probe.

The last model names were Nevada 750 Classic and Nevada 750 Aquila near (in English "black eagle", with all-black paintwork). A special anniversary version, dubbed the Nevada 750 Anniversario, was released in 2011 for the 20th anniversary of the Nevada range and the company's 90th anniversary and was sold through 2013. The Nevada was discontinued in 2016.
