= Moto Guzzi V9 =

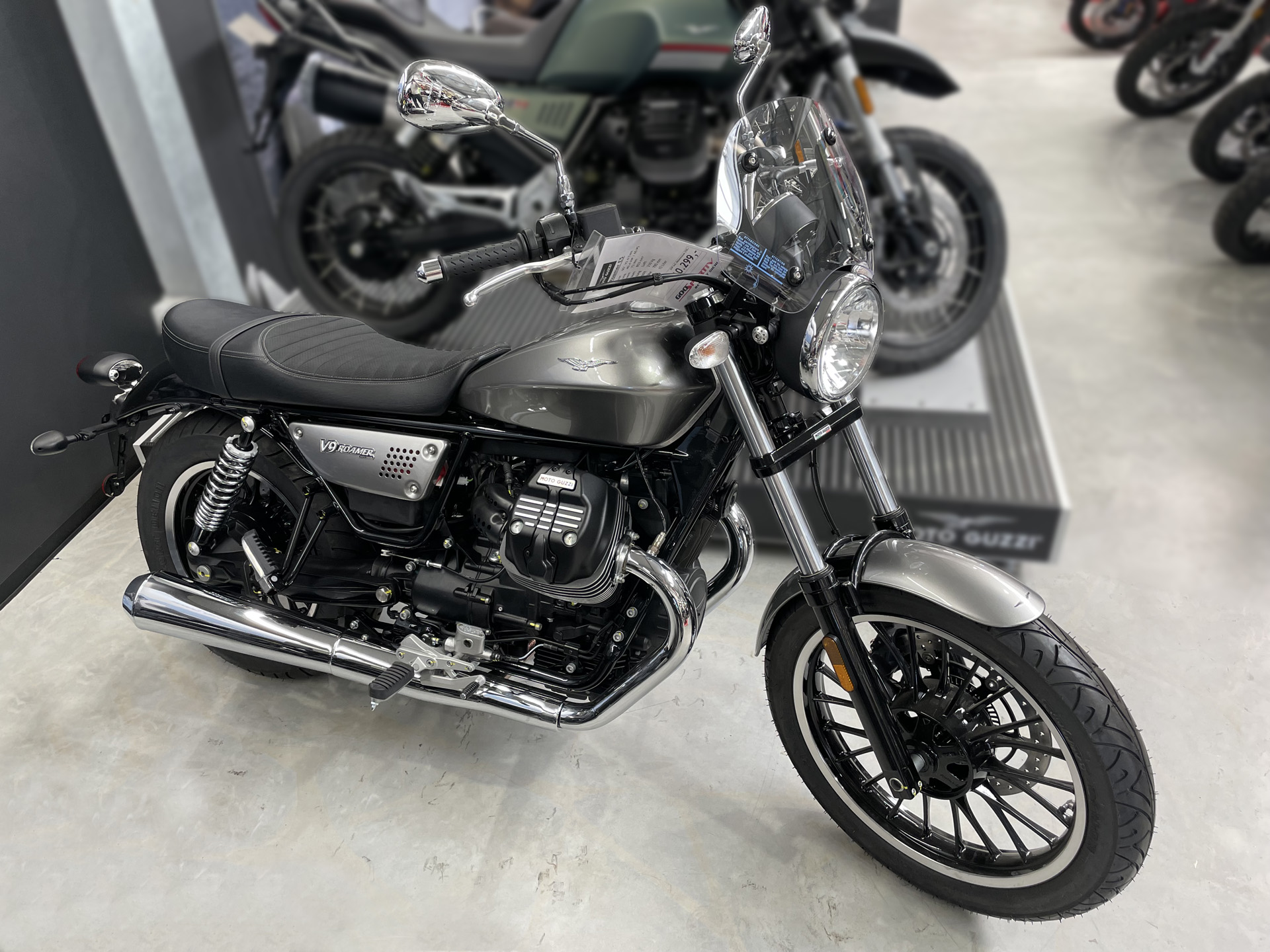
- Manufacturer: Moto Guzzi
- Production: 2016–2024
- Predecessor: Moto Guzzi Nevada
- Class: Cruiser
- Engine: 853 cc (52.1 cu in) OHV 2V/cyl. air-cooled, four-stroke, 90° V-twin
- Bore / stroke: 84 mm × 77 mm (3.3 in × 3.0 in)
- Compression ratio: 10.5:1
- Power: 55 hp (41 kW) @ 6,250 rpm
- Torque: 62 N⋅m (46 lb⋅ft) @ 3,000 rpm
- Transmission: 6-speed, manual
- Wheelbase: 58.3 in (1,480 mm)
- Weight: 440 lb (200 kg) (wet)
- Fuel capacity: 15 L (3.3 imp gal; 4.0 US gal)

The Moto Guzzi V9 is a cruiser motorcycle manufactured and marketed by Moto Guzzi. Introduced in 2016, it is available in two versions: Roamer and Bobber.

== Specifications ==
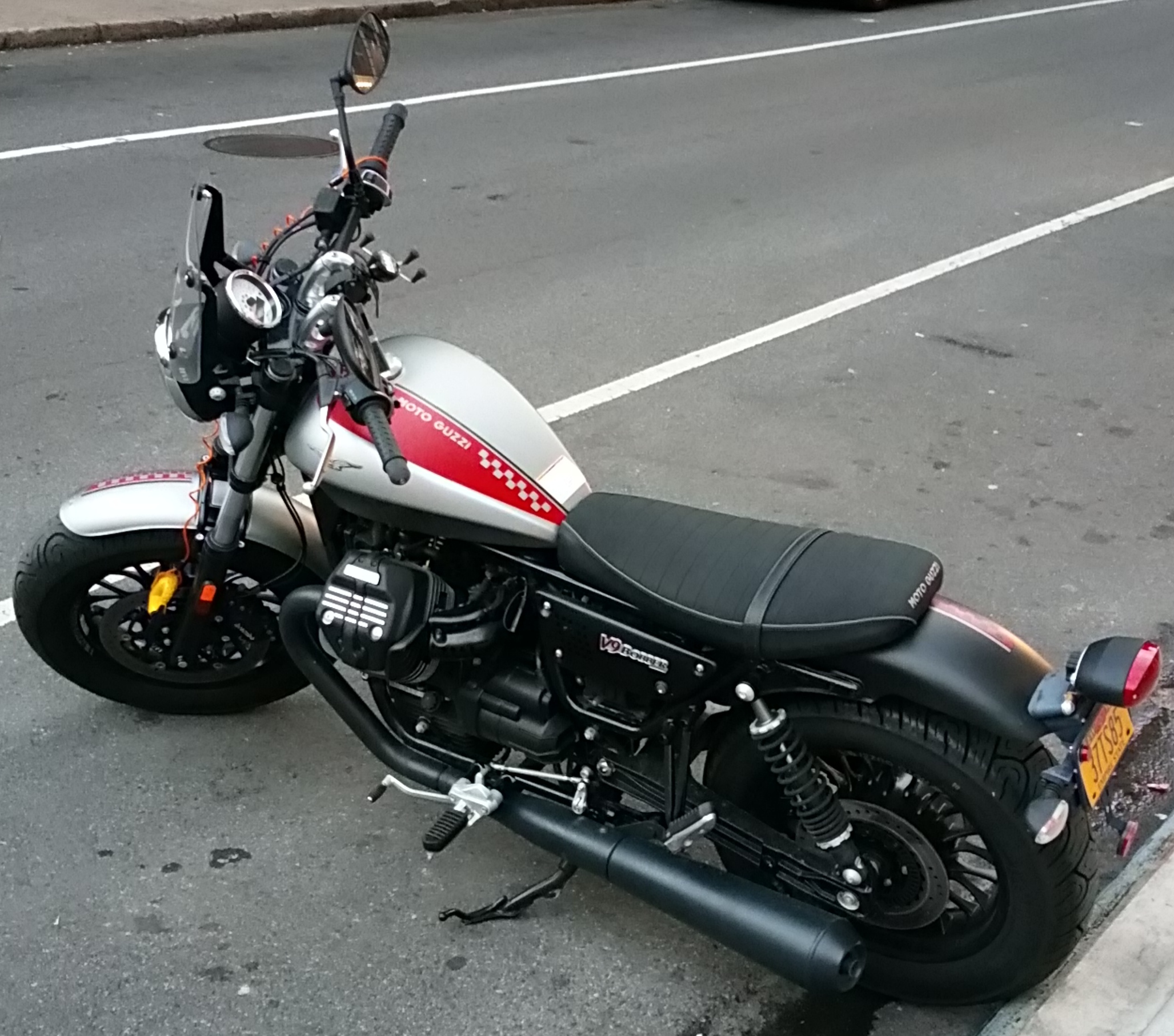
V9 Bobber

As with the other Moto Guzzis, the V9 has an engine is an air-cooled 90° longitudinal V-twin cylinder four-stroke, but in this case it is totally new with a displacement of 853 cm^{3}, with a power of 55 HP at 6250 rpm. It features two valves per cylinder, controlled by a single central camshaft and operated via rocker arms. The intake valve is made of titanium, which allows for a sharper crankshaft profile due to its low weight. Fuel is fed via an electronic injection system and the air intake is controlled by an electronically actuated central throttle body (so-called "ride by wire"), allowing for different response settings. Power is transmitted to the rear wheel via a six-speed gearbox and shaft drive. At launch, the bike was homologated to Euro 4 standards.

The front suspension features a 40 mm telescopic fork with 130 mm travel, while at the rear it uses a single double shock absorber with swingarm.

== Updates ==
In 2021, the V9 underwent an update, with the engine being adapted to the Euro 5 standard developing 65 HP, 10 HP more than before, delivered at 6800 rpm.

The V9 Bobber Special Edition version was presented in 2022, with a special black and gray twin-tone color scheme and bar-end mirrors fixed to the ends of the handlebars.
