= Moto Guzzi California =

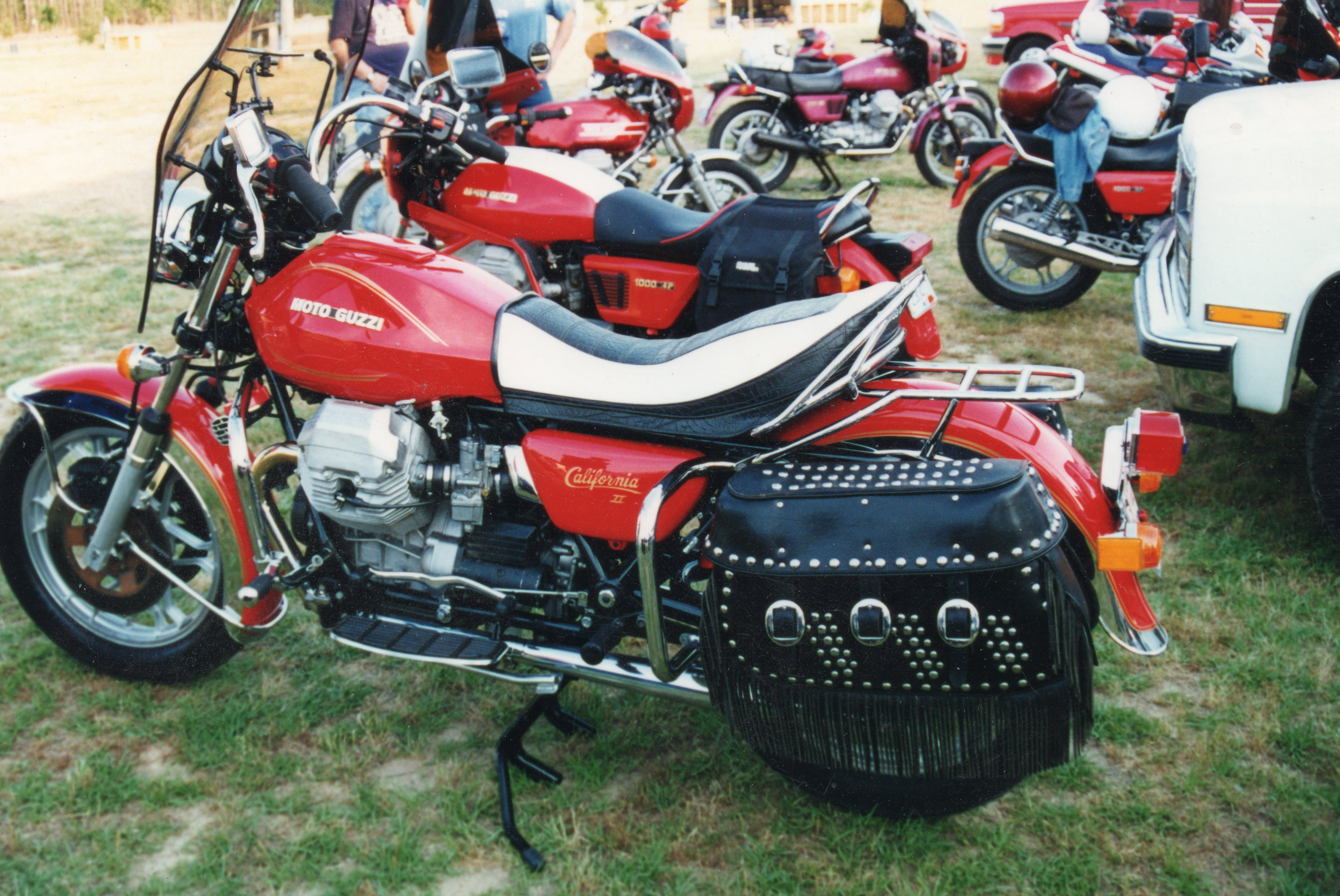
- Manufacturer: Moto Guzzi
- Production: 1971–2021
- Predecessor: 850GT
- Class: cruiser
- Engine: OHV 2V/cyl. air-cooled, four-stroke, V-twin
- Transmission: 5- or 6-speed, manual, shaft drive
- Suspension: Front: telescopic forks Rear: twin shocks
- Brakes: Front: Disc; Rear: Drum or disc

The Moto Guzzi California is a cruiser motorcycle manufactured and marketed by Moto Guzzi since 1971, with a standard seating position, footboards, heel-and-toe gearshift, and linked (discontinued for the new 1400 models) Brembo brakes.

The first California was designed in consultation with the Los Angeles Police Department Traffic Division to modify the Moto Guzzi Ambassador, the winner of the tender for the supply of vehicles for the L.A.P.D. The initial idea was to develop a motorcycle that could participate in a tender called for the Italian Police forces at the request of the then President of the Republic. The 700 cm^{3} V7 engine, however, did not fully satisfy this particular intended use, it was a little undersized for the heavy superstructures required. The commercial evolutions of the V7 that arrived at the end of the sixties, the 757 cm^{3} V7 Special and the 850 cm^{3} V 850 GT, provided the basis for trying the supply again. Given the excellent base and perfect adaptability to the use for which it was intended, Moto Guzzi, at the instigation of the local US importer, participated and won the tender for the supply of vehicles announced by the Los Angeles Police Department.

It originally had a left-foot gearshift, a bulletproof Lexan windshield and a sprung sidestand, along with the requisite siren, radio, extra police lights, and a standing quarter mile time of under 16 seconds. Later other police departments used them, including the California Highway Patrol.

Moto Guzzi have produced a version of the California almost continuously from 1971 to 2021, offering the last iteration as a 1400 cc model. In 2002, Moto Guzzi made an 80th anniversary special edition California model designed by Italian furniture maker Poltrona Frau.

For 2017, Moto Guzzi released a new bagger model called Moto Guzzi MGX21 Flying Fortress. This model is largely based on the California 1400 (1,380 cc) model with its claimed 95 hp and 89 lb-ft. of torque motor. The frame and associated pieces have been tweaked slightly to accommodate the larger 21-inch front wheel and anticipated load, also real carbon fiber is used for all bodywork.

The California has undergone six major evolutions, with many model variants in each generation:

- V7 850 GT California
- 850 T3 California
- California II
- California III
- California 1100
- California 1400
