= Moto Guzzi Quota =

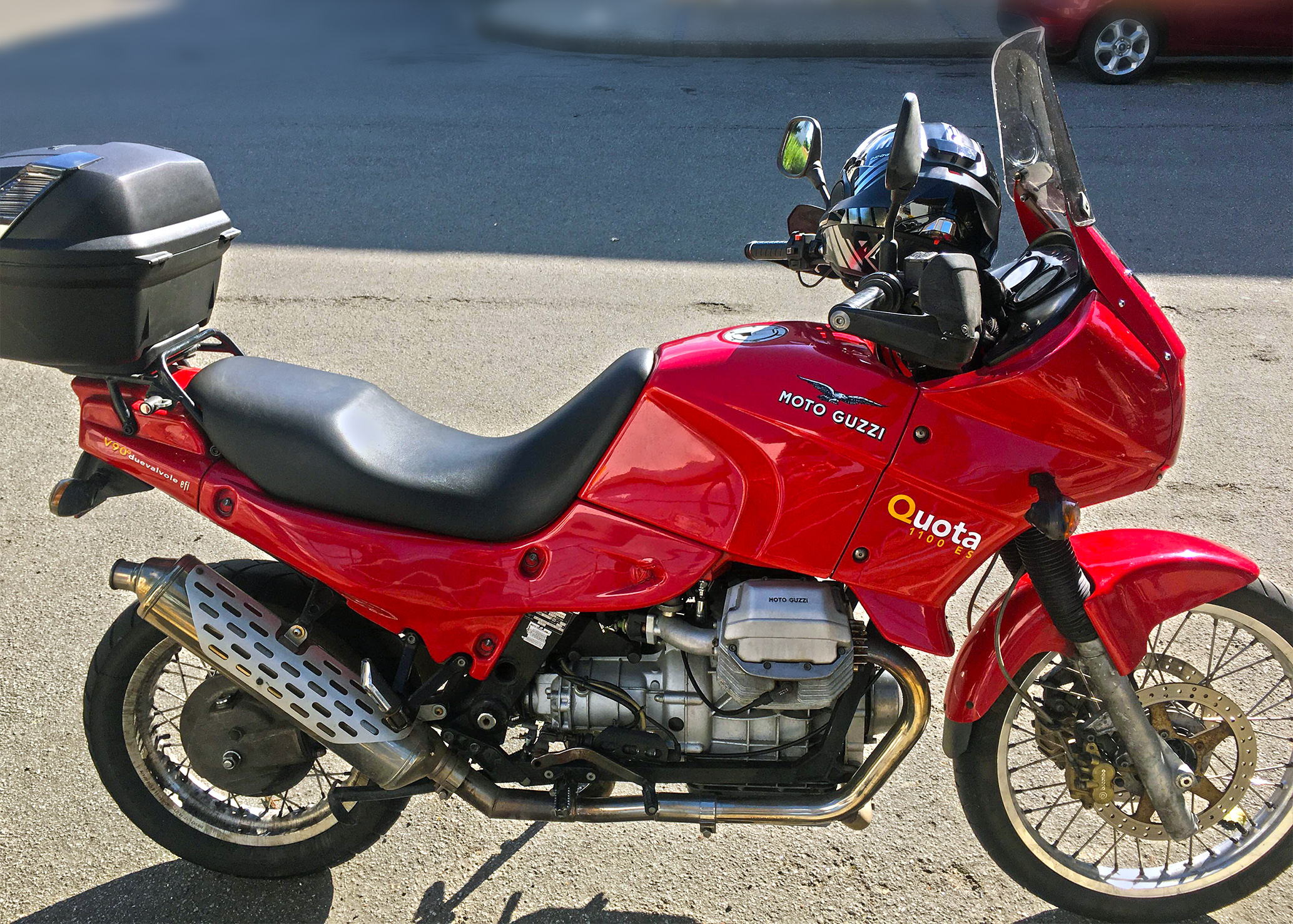
- Manufacturer: Moto Guzzi
- Production: 1992–2001
- Predecessor: Moto Guzzi NTX
- Successor: Moto Guzzi Stelvio
- Class: Enduro
- Engine: OHV 2V/cyl., four-stroke, V-twin
- Transmission: 5-speed, manual, shaft drive
- Suspension: Front: telescopic forks
- Brakes: Front: Disc; Rear: drum

The Moto Guzzi Quota is an Enduro manufactured and marketed by Moto Guzzi from 1992 to 2001.

== Description ==
Quota was presented in 1992 with 1000 cm^{3} motorization, and was produced up until 2001. Models from 1998 forward benefited from an increased displacement at 1064 cm^{3}. Other modifications were a lower saddle, newly designed front end with unified headlight, Brembo brakes, and larger diameter fork stems.

This motorcycle is a large enduro, notable for its use of the longitudinal V-twin engine, and shaft final drive. Compared to the other Guzzi models of the period equipped with the same type of engine, the delivery of the power has been slightly tuned to simplify use off-road.

Certainly its weight, of about 245 kg, did not favor driving on dirt roads, though it did still prove to be fairly agile in spite of this. The extensive fairings also made the bike reliable at highway speeds.

Despite a unique look and extensive capability, the failure to relaunch the commercial motorcycle house dell'Aquila led to poor advertising and sales.

The acquisition by Aprilia, which in the meantime had presented the ETV 1000 Caponord, marked the end of its production. At the end of 2007, Moto Guzzi replaced it with the new model Stelvio.
