= KLR (disambiguation) =

KLR or klr may refer to:

- Kalmar Airport, Sweden (IATA code KLR)
- Kawartha Lakes Railway, Ontario, Canada
- Kawasaki KLR250, a dual-sport motorcycle
- Kawasaki KLR650, a dual-sport motorcycle
- Whistlestop Valley, formerly the Kirklees Light Railway, West Yorkshire, UK
- Khaling language (ISO code klr)
