= Terry Hershner =

American motorcycle designer

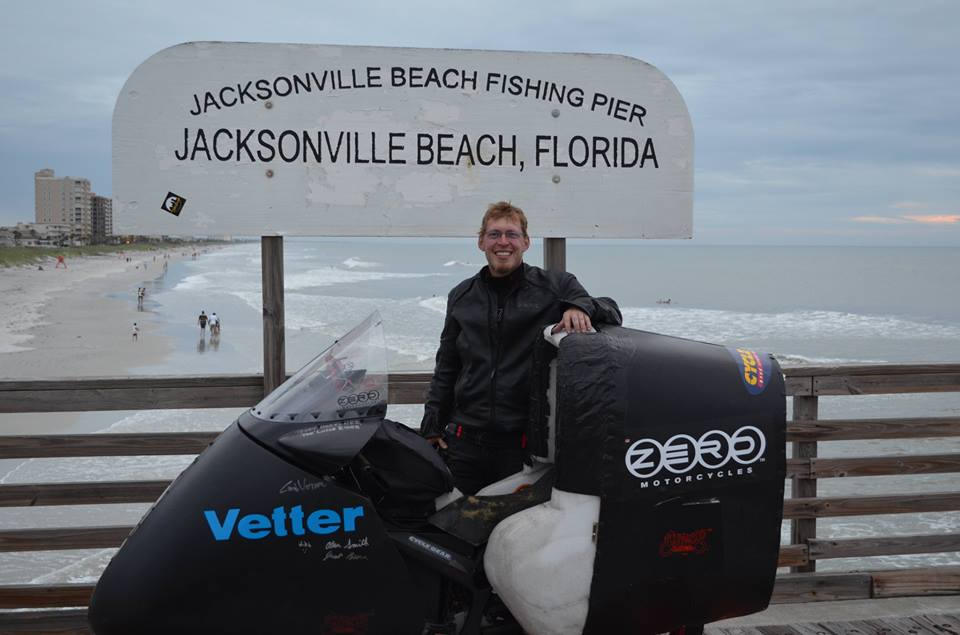
- Hershner on June 5, 2013, moments after completing the first coast to coast run on electric motorcycle
- Known for: Long-distance motorcycling and electric motorcycle modification

Terry Hershner, nicknamed Electric Terry, is an electric vehicle and renewable energy advocate from Florida. He is known for his long-distance trips and record breaking on his electric motorcycle. He rides a modified production 2012 Zero Motorcycles S ZF9 electric motorcycle, outfitted with a Craig Vetter streamlined fairing. In 2013, he was the first person to cross the United States on an electric motorcycle. In 2014, he became the first ever electric motorcycle rider to go 1000 miles in 24 hours and earn an award from the Iron Butt Association, and was also the first electric motorcycle to win the Craig Vetter Fuel Economy Challenge. Hershner is a board member of the Electric Auto Association, frequent public speaker and radio show guest, and transportation advisor to the international environmental student organization IDEAS for Us.

== Education ==
Hershner studied Electrical and Mechanical Engineering at North Carolina State University.

== Electric motorcycle modifications ==
=== 2012 ===
Hershner purchased a new Zero S ZF9 electric motorcycle from Hollywood Electrics on April 26, 2012. It had a range of up to 114 miles in the city and 63 miles with half city/half highway riding. To increase this, Hershner modified his electric motorcycle to increase charging capacity and extend the driving range. He initially added an SAE J1772 charging socket, and three onboard 1 kW battery chargers to raise the total onboard charging to 4 kW. Using the public charging electric vehicle network, he tested the modifications first on a 500-mile trip to Miami, FL, and then a 1200-mile trip to the Bonnaroo Music Festival in Manchester, TN, which he said was the longest distance ridden on an electric motorcycle at that time.

After these two long-distance trips, Hershner made additional modifications by adding two 2500 watt Elcon chargers to the Zero to max out the available power from a public charging station to charge at 7.2 kW from level 2 and 1.8 kW from level 1 for 9 kW combined charging, reducing the charge time to one hour to recharge his 9 kWh ZF9 pack.

In December 2012, Hershner made his first attempt to cross the country on his 2012 Zero S ZF9 electric motorcycle but ran into difficulties in west Texas, as he repeatedly found public charging stations locked behind fences and not accessible to the public. As a result of the inaccessible charging stations and wide gaps between charging locations in the south west desert areas of Arizona, New Mexico and west Texas, he found the need for even farther driving range.

=== 2013 ===
In early spring 2013 he added two 3 kWh accessory batteries mounted as saddle bags, which increased the total capacity to 15 kWh. Realizing there are two Level 2 charging ports within reach at most charging stations, Hershner added a second J1772 socket and chargers to the motorcycle which now allowed him to charge at 14 kW instead of 7 kW.

In an attempt to lower the aerodynamic drag coefficient, in May 2013, American motorcycle and fairing designer, Craig Vetter helped Hershner build a modern version of a Vetter Streamliner. The added fairings allowed Hershner's electric motorcycle go nearly twice as far on a charge, and help span the wide gaps between charging locations in the south west desert along Interstate 10, that left him stranded before.

On June 5, 2013, six months after his first attempt, Hershner successfully completed the first trip across the United States on an electric motorcycle (Kanichi Fujiwara did it a decade earlier as part of a global circumnavigation, but on an electric moped). The solo trip from San Diego, CA to Jacksonville, FL took five days, or 135 hours, with no support vehicle and using only the existing charging infrastructure. Despite having to replace a motor due to a loose sprocket, Hershner completed the trip roughly 36 hours before another electric motorcycle team, also attempting to become the first to ever cross the country. As a result, Hershner became the first person in history to "unofficially" go coast to coast on an electric motorcycle.

On July 7, 2013, shortly after his arrival back to the west coast from Florida, he placed 2nd to a Tesla Model S in the BC2BC All Electric Vehicle Rally riding from Canada to Mexico. Subsequently, on November 24, 2013, Hershner and his passenger, Chelsea Liggatt, became the first to travel "two up" across the United States by electric motorcycle.

=== 2014 ===
In 2014, Craig Vetter and students from Virginia Tech helped Hershner rebuild the tail section out of aluminum to hold 21 kWh of batteries, and up to 24 kW of chargers that would run off 4 J1772 level 2 plugs, at 6 kW each. Later, on August 29, 2014, Hershner became the first electric motorcycle to win the historic Craig Vetter Fuel Economy Challenge travelling 172 miles on a single charge, at speeds up to 80 mph, for 1.3 cents per mile cost in electricity.

On September 15, 2014, the first day of National Drive Electric Week, Hershner became the first electric motorcycle rider to earn an Iron Butt Award (Saddlesore 1000) from the Iron Butt Association. He rode over 1047 miles from Northern California to the Mexico border and back, in 22 hours and 57 minutes using only ChargePoint charging stations.

=== 2015 ===
On May 7, 2015, Electric Terry became the first electric motorcyclist to ride 300 miles on a single charge. He carried 27 kWh of battery on board, more than a Nissan LEAF electric car.
