= Mystery Ship =

Mystery Ship may refer to:

- Travel Air Type R Mystery Ship, an early model of racing airplane
- The Mystery Ship, a 1917 serial adventure film
- Vetter Mystery Ship, a limited-edition motorcycle from 1980
- Mystery Ship (film), a 1941 American film by Columbia Pictures
- Q-ship, a type of armored merchant ship
- Mystery airship, a 19th-century term for an unidentified flying object

== See also ==
- Mary Celeste, an 1861 sailing vessel found mysteriously abandoned at sea
- "Ride Captain Ride", a 1970 popular song that features the phrase in its refrain
