= Vetter Streamliner =

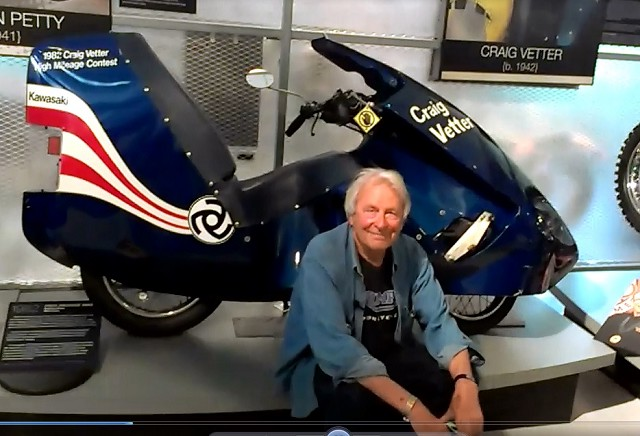
- Vetter posing with his 1981 Streamliner at the AMA Motorcycle Museum in Pickerington, Ohio, July 2016
- Manufacturer: Craig Vetter
- Also called: Vetter High Mileage Luxury Touring Bike
- Production: Prototype, designed and built 1980–1981
- Class: Feet forwards
- Engine: 250 cc Kawasaki four-stroke single
- Power: c. 20 hp (15 kW)
- Fuel consumption: 108 mpg_{‑US} (46 km/L)

The Vetter Streamliner was a feet forwards motorcycle made by Craig Vetter in 1980–1981 to demonstrate high fuel economy with an aerodynamic fairing.

== Design ==
Vetter had been creating his Vetter "Windjammer" fairings for some years before the Streamliner was designed, and created the Craig Vetter Fuel Economy Challenge to heighten interest in aerodynamic-conscious design. Vetter's objective was to surpass the economy of the 1980 mileage contest winner, a conventional Harley-Davidson with tall gearing.

The Streamliner was built around a Kawasaki KZ250 custom touring bike, with foot controls moved to the front. In contest conditions the machine achieved 108 miles per US gallon (46 km/L) (125 mpg in best-case conditions), versus the manufacturer's claimed 80 miles per US gallon (34 km/L) for the original, unfaired model.

Vetter now considers more than 8–10 hp overpowered, and has said that selecting an engine with the appropriate power output is "critical" for mileage contests.

== Influence on industry and legacy ==
Vetter's streamliner is credited with "inspiring others to push the limits of motorcycle fuel economy", with many other entrants in his mileage challenge and one electric motorcycle modeled after Vetter's original.

The Vetter Streamliner is now on display at the AMA Motorcycle Hall of Fame Museum in Ohio.

== Other Vetter Streamliners ==
Vetter also created a fairing for a downhill skateboard speed contest in 1978 which bore the name "Vetter Streamliner". It was featured in a 1978 CBS Sports Spectacular broadcast from Derby Downs in Akron, Ohio.
