= Triumph X-75 Hurricane =

British motorcycle

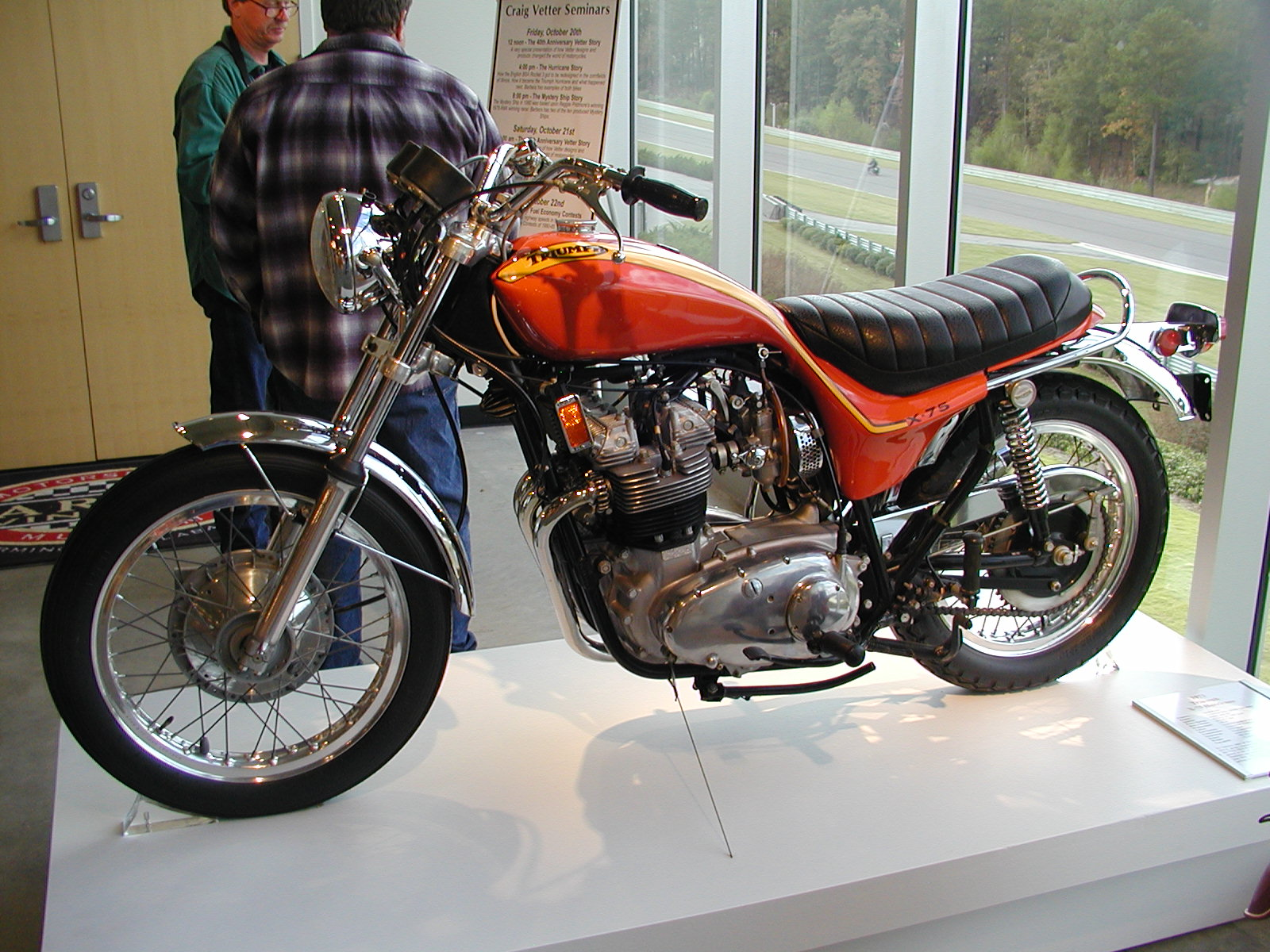
- Manufacturer: Triumph
- Production: 1972–1973
- Class: Standard
- Engine: 740 cc (45 cu in) air cooled transverse triple
- Power: 58 bhp (43 kW) @ 7,250 rpm

The Triumph X-75 Hurricane was a 'factory special' motorcycle designed by fairing specialist Craig Vetter. The X-75 had swooping glassfibre bodywork, a three US-gallon petrol tank, lowered gearing and a distinctive triple exhaust on the right-hand side. The motorcycle is credited with creating a new class of motorcycle, the cruiser.

It was ultimately released as a Triumph model in 1973, the BSA factory having closed its doors in late 1972.

== History ==
Vetter was commissioned by BSA's US distributor to customise the BSA Rocket 3 to appeal more to American tastes.

When, in 1968, the new BSA Rocket 3/Triumph Trident triples were shown to the American BSA-Triumph management, they were underwhelmed. They knew Honda had an important bike (the CB750) coming along, and they felt the triple's price of $1800 was too high and that technical details (like vertically split crankcases and pushrod ohv valve train) were far from "cutting edge". However, they acknowledged that the bike was fast, and a sales team led by BSA Vice-president Don Brown decided to launch the bike by using a Rocket-3 to set some records at Daytona, records which were broken in 1971 by the Kawasaki Z1.

Brown felt that the BSA/Triumph triples needed a different look to succeed in the US, and he engaged designer Craig Vetter to give the BSA A75 a customised face-lift, with a brief to make it "sleeker and more balanced". (Brown revealed the Vetter project to Peter Thornton, President of BSA/Triumph North America, but as Brown's initiative had not been authorised by BSA, Vetter had problems being paid, waiting two years for his fee).

Vetter created the Triumph Hurricane in the summer of 1969, and in October 1969 he unveiled the prototype with "BSA" on the tank as the new ‘Rocket Three’. Thornton and the American officials were impressed, and Vetter's bike was then sent to the UK, but the bike arrived in England just as the BSA marque was about to be ended. At BSA-Triumph's design facility at Umberslade Hall, the design was seen as too "trendy" by chief designer Bert Hopwood; but after very positive public reaction to the design when it appeared on the front of US magazine Cycle World in September 1970, the UK managers changed their minds. They realised they had a large stock of obsolete BSA Rocket-3 parts that could now be turned into a premium-priced motorcycle.

Motorcycle News carried a BSA press release in 1972 containing: "A Vetter model for America only is in the production plan for the '73 season, but no official announcement will be made until later in the year".

Engineer Steve Mettam was given the job of supervising production for the 1972/3 season; and the Vetter BSA Rocket3 became the Triumph X75 Hurricane. 1,183 engines were put aside for X75 production. However, BSA was facing bankruptcy and the design went into a limited production run of 1200 as the Triumph X-75 Hurricane in 1972. Production stopped in 1973 after the X-75 was unable to meet new American noise standards.

The prototype BSA Hurricane is on display at the AMA Motorcycle Hall of Fame museum in Pickerington, Ohio.

Hurricane at Birmingham National Motorcycle Museum

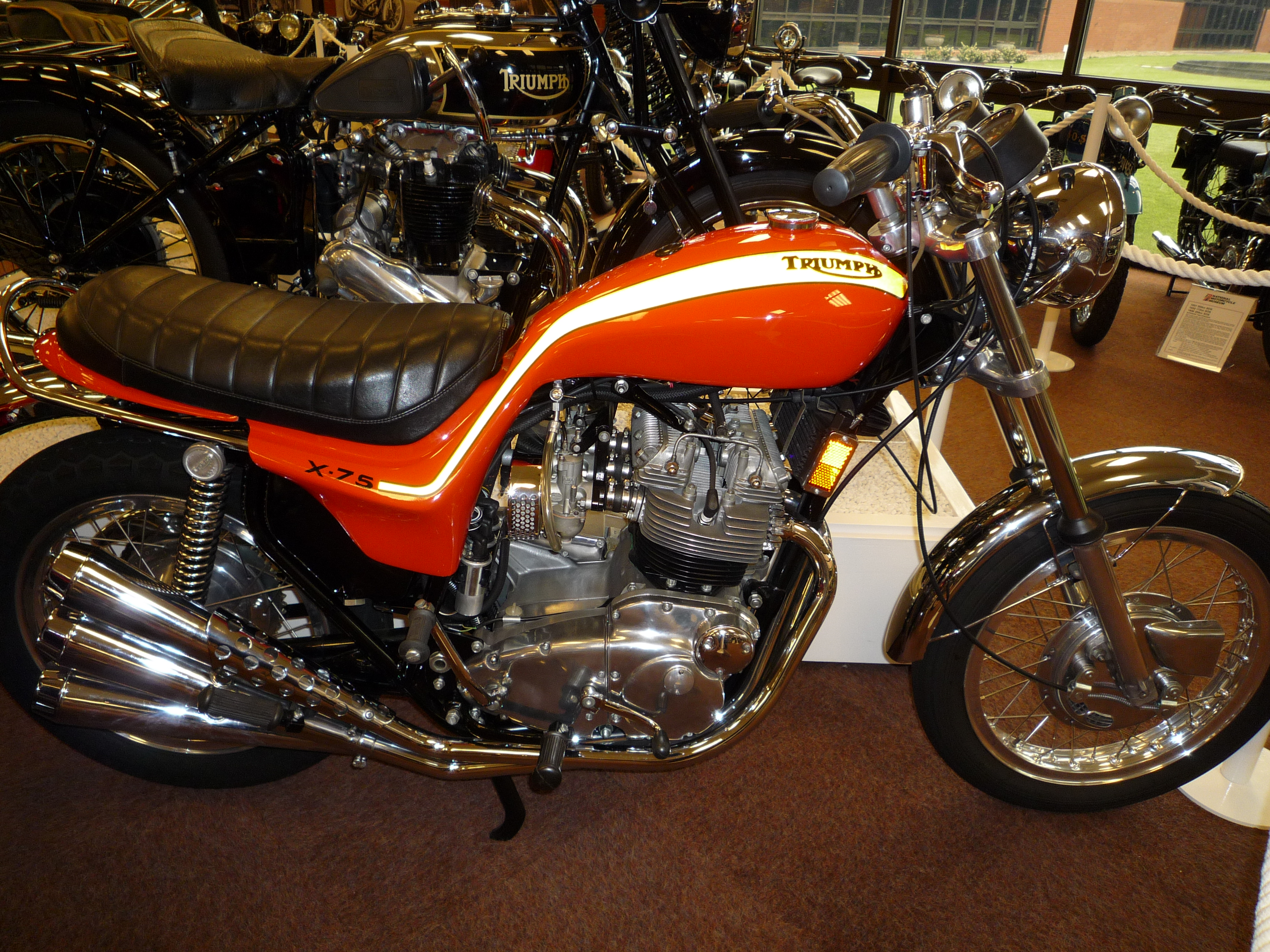

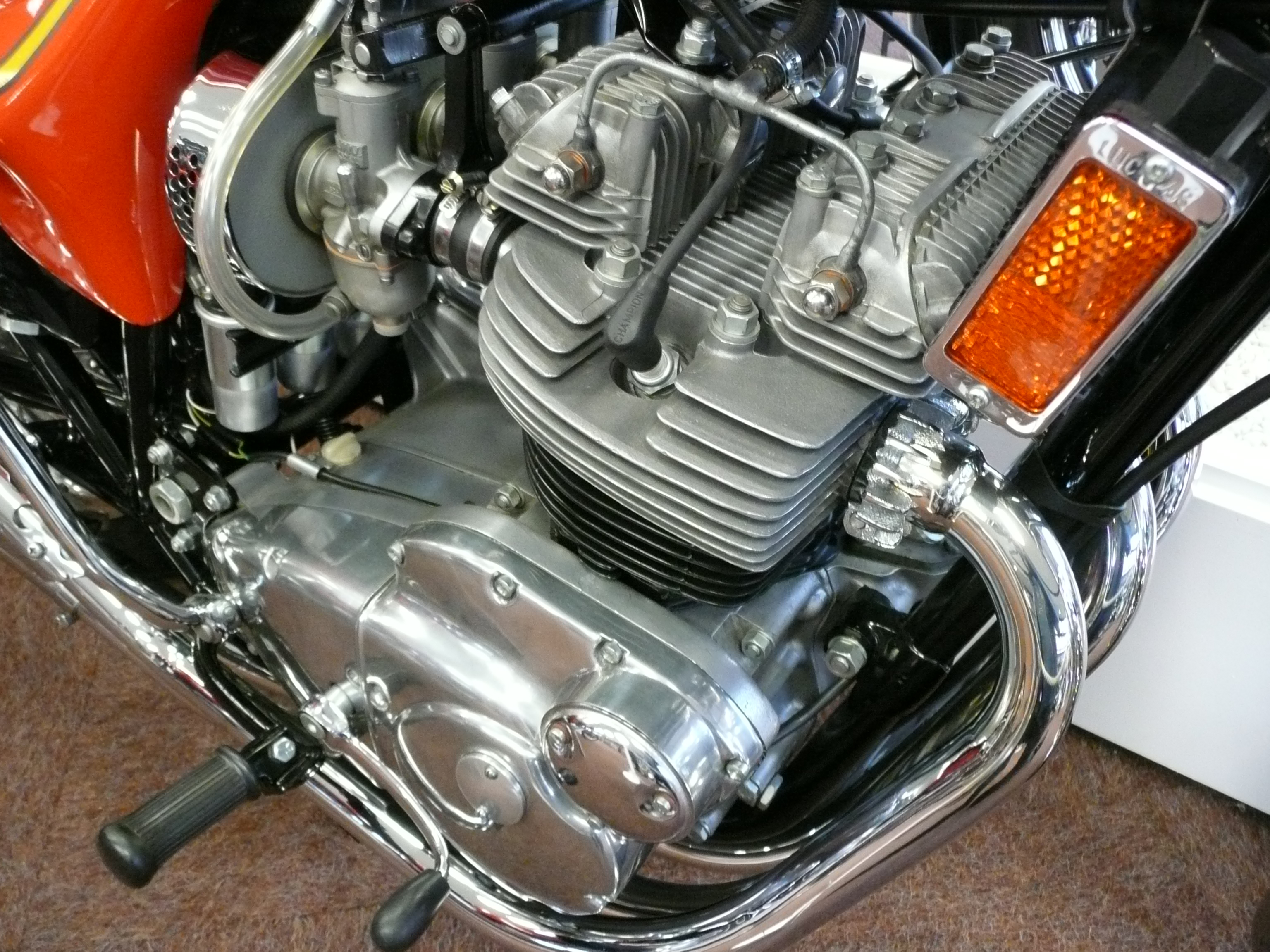

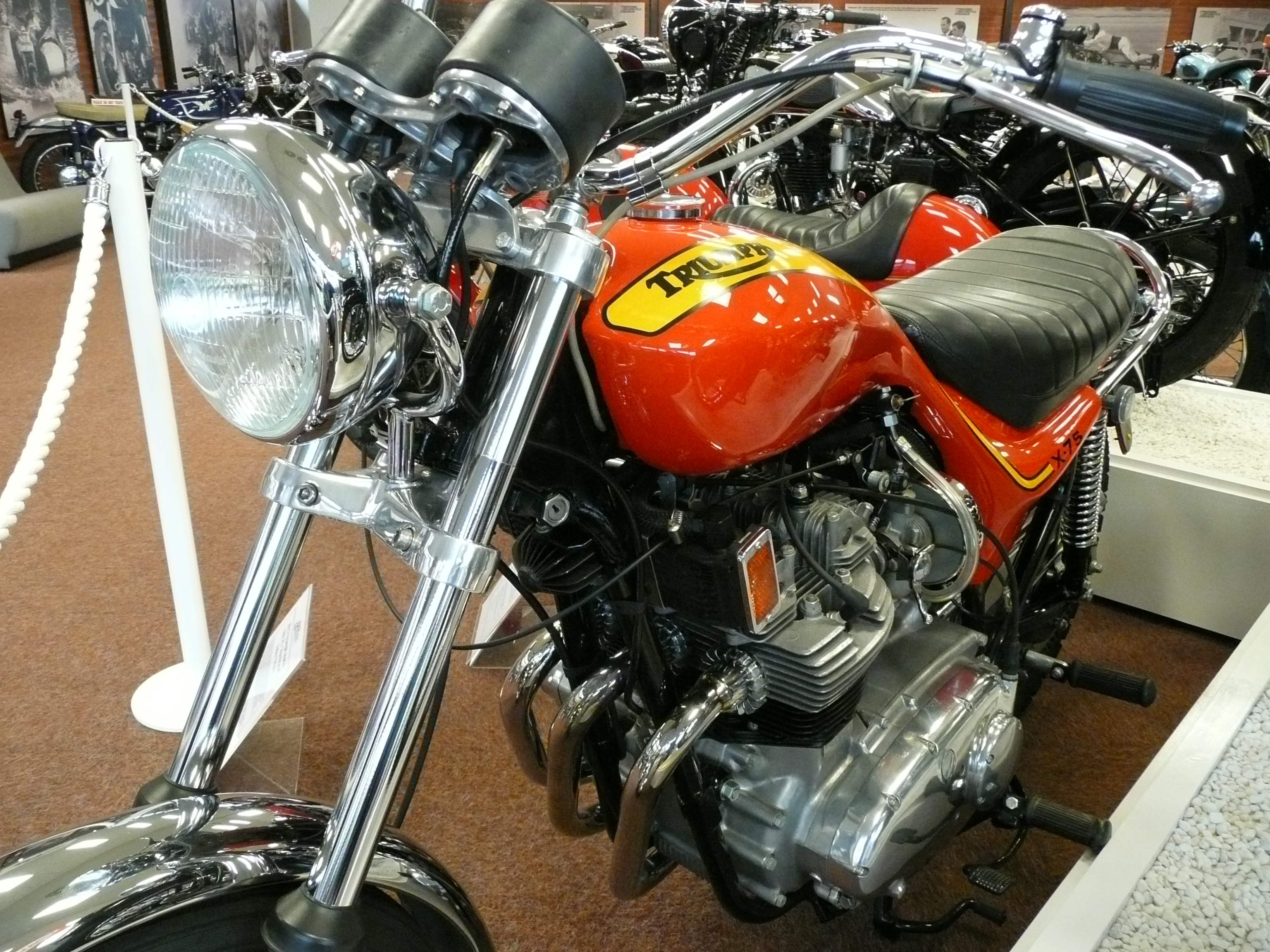

== See also ==
- List of Triumph motorcycles
