= Kawasaki KLR250 =

Motorcycle

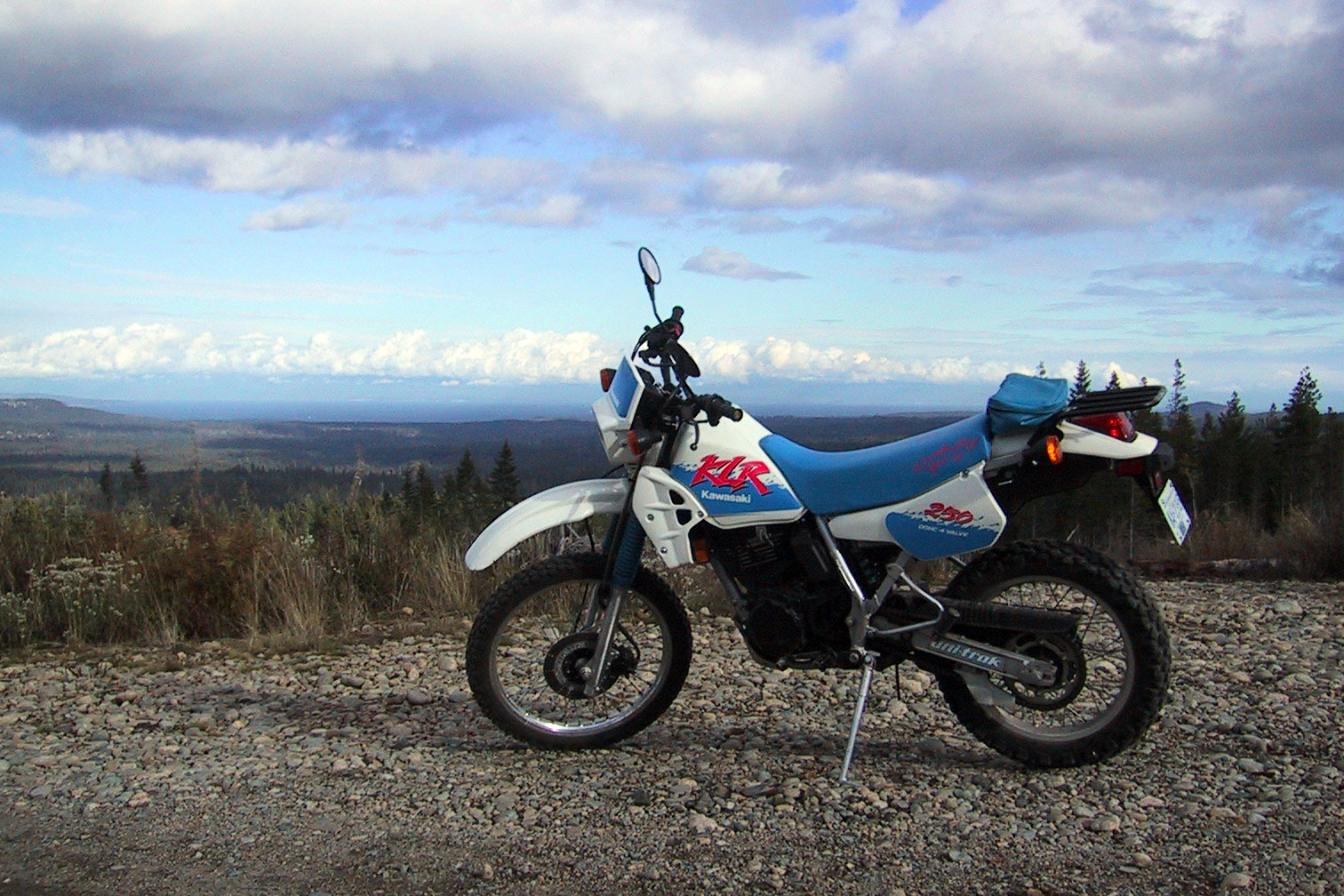
- 1985 KLR 250
- Manufacturer: Kawasaki Motors
- Parent company: Kawasaki Heavy Industries
- Production: 1984–2005
- Predecessor: KL250C
- Engine: 249 cc 4-stroke, DOHC, four-valve, single cylinder
- Power: 23hp - 28hp
- Wheelbase: 55.7 inches (141 cm)
- Dimensions: L: 84.3 inches (214 cm)
- Weight: 258 lb (117 kg) dry (dry)
- Fuel capacity: 2.9 US gal (11.0 litres)

The Kawasaki KLR250/KL250D is a motorcycle produced from 1984 to 2005 as the successor to the 1978 to 1983 KL250C, with only minor changes during the model run. This lightweight dualsport motorcycle was used for several years by the US military for a variety of tasks, including messenger duty and reconnaissance, and the New Zealand Defence Force primarily utilized by light infantry, scouts, and signallers.

== Development & Design ==
It was produced by Kawasaki Heavy Industries in Japan and exported to many parts of the world, including the U.S. and Canada, Europe and Australia. The Chilean national police ("Carabineros de Chile") made extensive use of the KLR250. It is similar in appearance to the larger KLR650. The KLR250 shares many engine parts with an ATV sold by Kawasaki, the KSF250 "Mojave".

In the USA the KLR250 was discontinued at the end of the 2005 model run and was replaced by the KLX250S in 2006. In other markets the KLX250 was introduced in 2001 and has been sold to the current day.

== Specifications ==
The base specifications have remained virtually unchanged throughout the production period but differs from the KL250 Super Sherpa which is air-cooled and has electric start.

=== Engine ===
- Type: Four-stroke, DOHC, four-valve, single cylinder liquid cooled
- Displacement: 249 cc
- Bore and Stroke: 74.0 x 58.0 mm
- Carburetor: Keihin CVK34
- Compression ratio: 11.0:1
- Power Output:

28 horsepower 1985–1989
23 horsepower 1990–2005 @ 9,000 rpm, (U.S. model due to change in cam profile)

- Maximum torque: 23 N-m (2.3 kg-m, 16.5 ft-lb) @ 8,000 rpm (U.S. model)
- Starting Method: Kick

=== Drivetrain ===
- Transmission: 6 Speed
- Final Drive: Chain EK520 L-O 104 links

=== Brakes ===
- Front: Hydraulic disc
- Rear: hydraulic drum

=== Suspension ===
- Front: Air-adjustable hydraulic telescopic fork
- Rear: UNI-TRAK single-shock system (adjustable)

=== Wheels and tires ===
- Front: 3.00 x 21 tire
- Rear: 4.60 x 17 tire

=== Dimensions ===
- Length: 84.3 in
- Seat height: 33.7 in
- Rake and Trail: 28.5 degrees / 4.6 in
- Wheelbase: 55.7 in
- Weight: 258 lb (117 kg) dry
- Fuel Capacity: 2.9 US gal (11.0 litres)
- Engine oil capacity: 2 liters

=== Fuel Efficiency ===
- 80 miles per US gallon (2.9 L/100 km; 96 mpg_{‑imp}) (est)
- Maximum range: 188.5 U.S. miles
