= Ruhstorf an der Rott =

Ruhstorf a.d.Rott
- Municipality
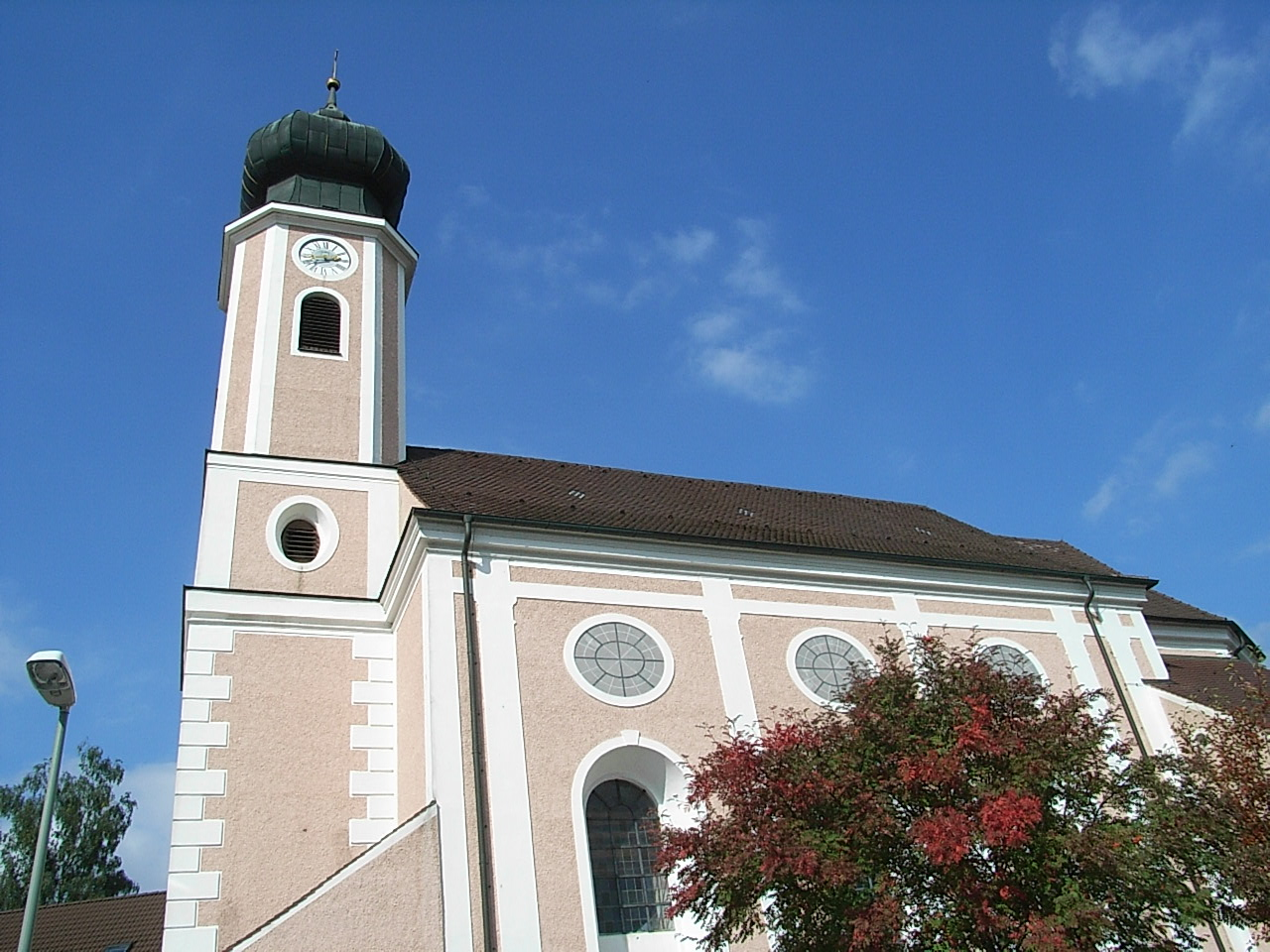
- Church of the Virgin Mary

- Coat of arms

- Location of Ruhstorf a.d.Rott within Passau district
- Interactive map of Ruhstorf a.d.Rott
- Location within Germany Location within Bavaria
- Coordinates: 48°26′16″N 13°20′10″E
- Country: Germany
- State: Bavaria
- Admin. region: Niederbayern
- District: Passau

Government
  - Mayor (2020–26): Andreas Jakob (CSU)

Area
  - Total: 51.39 km^{2} (19.84 sq mi)
- Elevation: 319 m (1,047 ft)

Population (2025-12-31)
  - Total: 7,145
  - Density: 139.0/km^{2} (360.1/sq mi)
- Time zone: UTC+01:00 (CET)
  - Summer (DST): UTC+02:00 (CEST)
- Postal codes: 94099
- Dialling codes: 08531
- Vehicle registration: PA
- Website: www.ruhstorf.de

Ruhstorf (Central Bavarian: Ruaschtoaf or Ruaschdoaf) is a municipality in the district of Passau in Bavaria in Germany. In Ruhstorf, there is a music school and there are two different churches, the „Marienkirche“ (church of the Virgin Mary) and the „Pfarrkirche Christkönig“ (church of Jesus Christ, the king).

Hatz has its seat in the geographic middle of the district.

== Mayor ==
The current mayor of Ruhstorf is Andreas Jakob.
