= Diesel motorcycle =

Motorcycle with a diesel engine

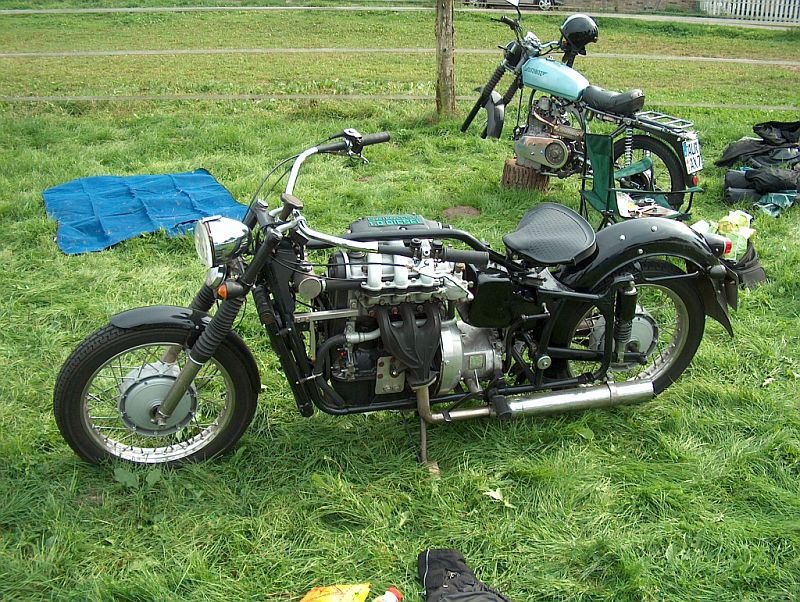
Custom motorcycle with a diesel engine

A diesel motorcycle is a motorcycle with a diesel engine. Few diesel motorcycles have existed as factory offerings, though engine swaps may also be done to convert gasoline-powered motorcycles to diesel.

== Production vehicles ==
=== Sommer 462 ===
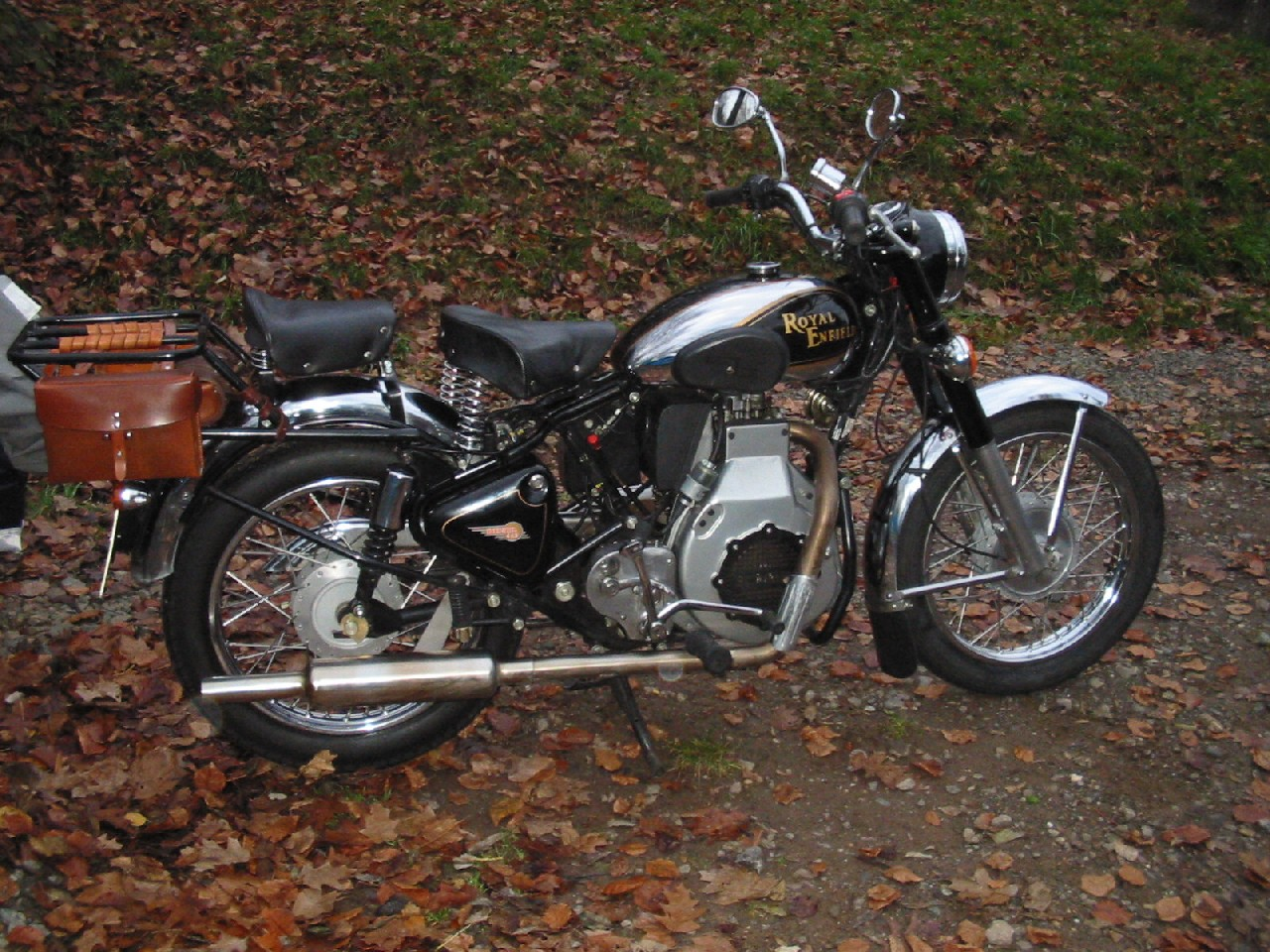
Sommer 462

Sommer Motorradtechnik (de) produces the Sommer 462. It uses a Hatz diesel engine and Royal Enfield parts, and is assembled by hand in Eppstein.

=== Track T-800CDI ===
Track T-800CDI

The Track T-800CDI was produced by Dutch company Evaproducts with an 800 cc common rail turbo-diesel inline-three engine used in Smart cars. It used a continuously variable transmission (CVT) and had a claimed fuel efficiency of up to 140 mpg_{‑US} (1.7 l/100 km). It was only sold in the Netherlands, and the company eventually closed.

=== Royal Enfield Taurus and Sooraj 325 ===
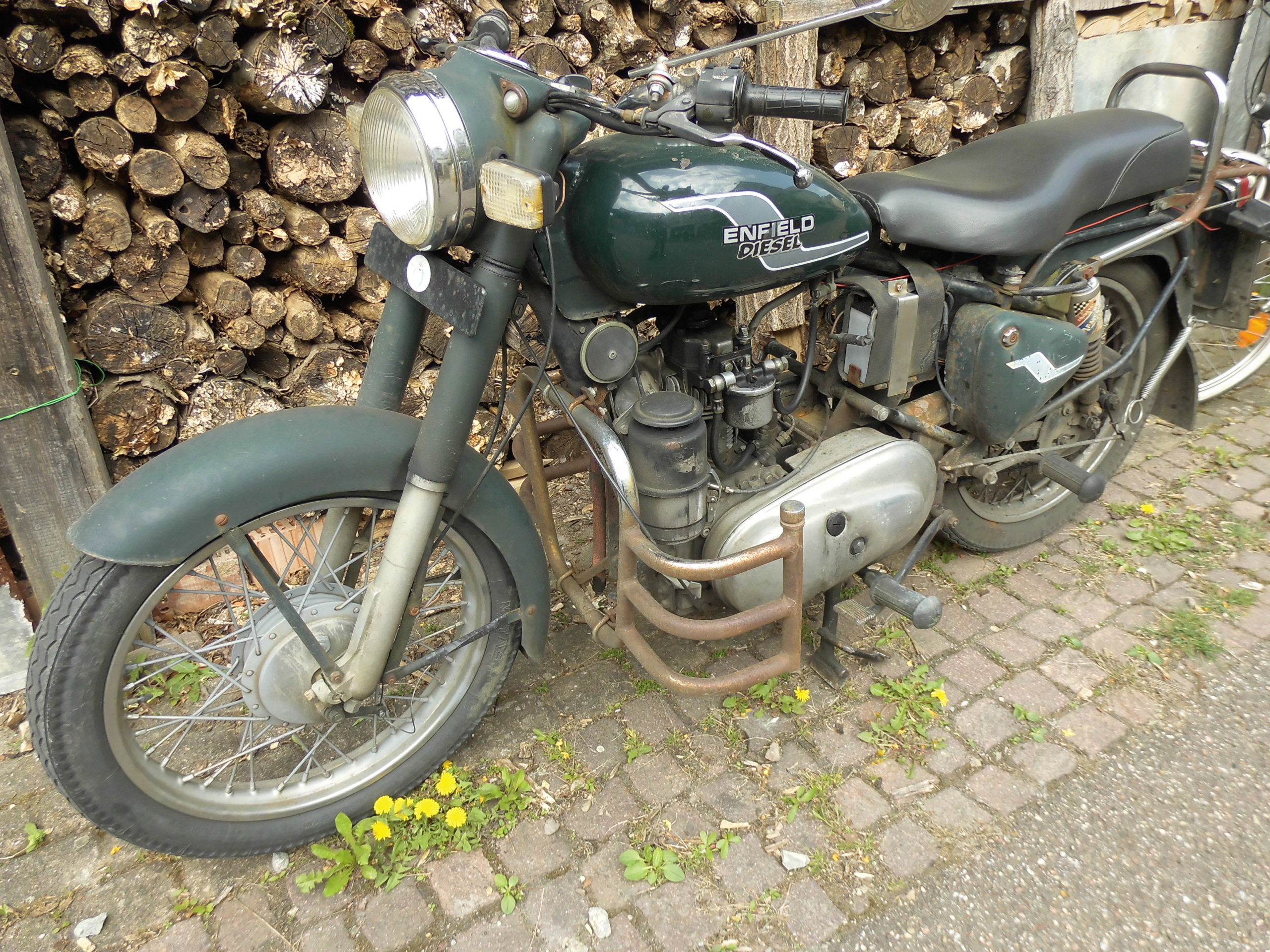
Royal Enfield Taurus

Royal Enfield was among the only manufacturers that had mass-produced a diesel motorcycle, before it was discontinued owing to pollution laws. The Royal Enfield Taurus, derived from the British-designed Bullet and produced in the 1990s, used a 325 cc Lombardini diesel engine.

Sooraj, a tractor company based in Saharanpur, India, also produced a Lombardini-powered diesel motorcycle in the 1980s.

=== HDT M1030M1 ===
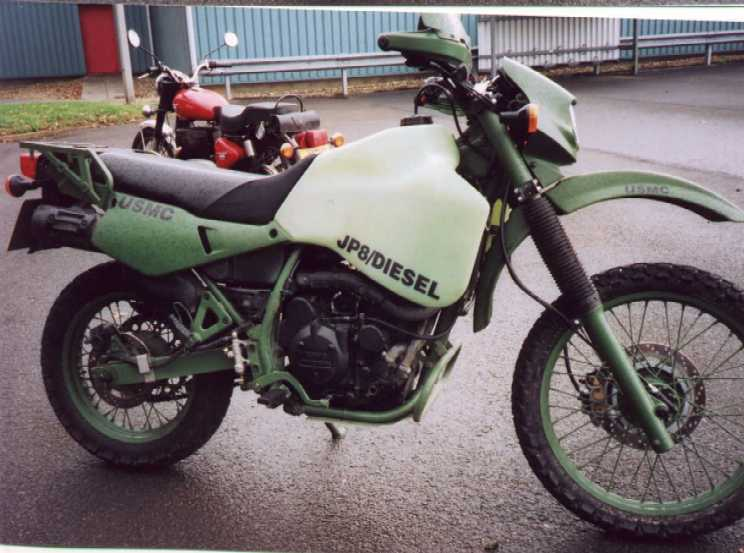
HDT M1030M1

Manufactured by Hayes Diversified Technologies (HDT), the M1030M1 is a Kawasaki KLR650-based motorcycle designed to run on fuels such as diesel and jet fuels, reducing military logistical overhead by doing away with gasoline. Its top speed exceeds 80 miles per hour (130 km/h), and fuel consumption is advertised to be 96 mpg_{‑US} (2.5 L/100 km; 115 mpg_{‑imp}) at 55 mph (89 km/h).

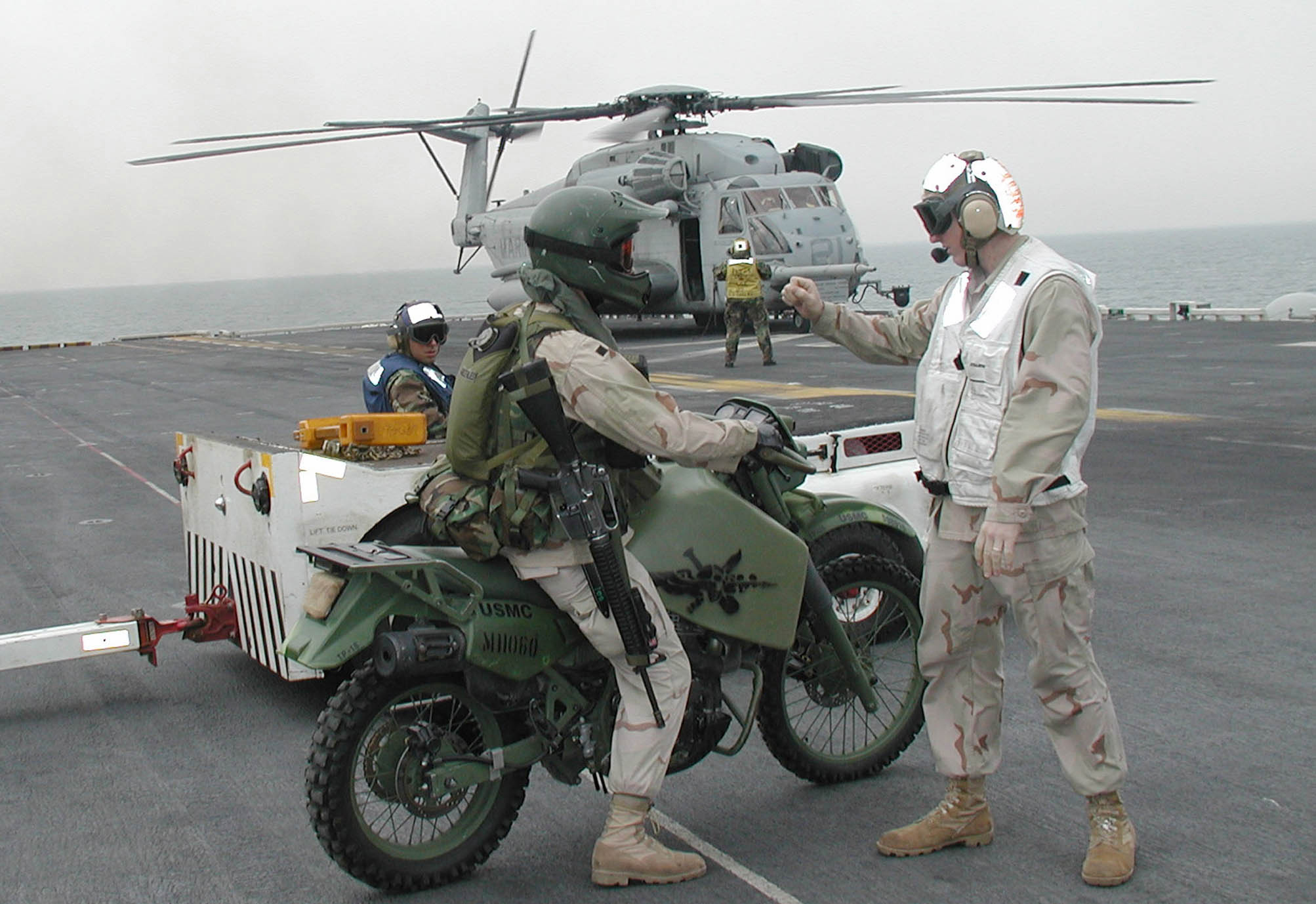
A US Marine on an M1030M1, awaiting a helicopter flight into Kuwait

After several years of engine development at Cranfield University, the HDT M1030M1 entered service with the United States Marine Corps in 2002. The M1030M1E model is sold to the United Kingdom and other European NATO countries. A version for the civilian market, the D650A1 Bulldog, was originally slated for release in March 2006, but due to increased military demand for the M1030M1, production of the civilian Bulldog has been delayed indefinitely.

At the Eurosatory exhibition in 2010, HDT presented the M1030M2, an improved model with an upgraded 670 cc multifuel engine that produces 20% more power. A patented technology called MAC-C1 enables the engine to run on five major jet fuel types and vegetable oil-based biodiesel in addition to standard gasoline and diesel fuel. As of September 2010, no orders had been placed.

M1030M1s have successfully taken part at the British National Rally and the Bonneville Speed Trials. Faired and unfaired M1030M1s won second and fourth place at the 2011 Mid-Ohio Craig Vetter Fuel Economy Challenge.

== Concepts and prototypes ==
=== Neander 1400 ===
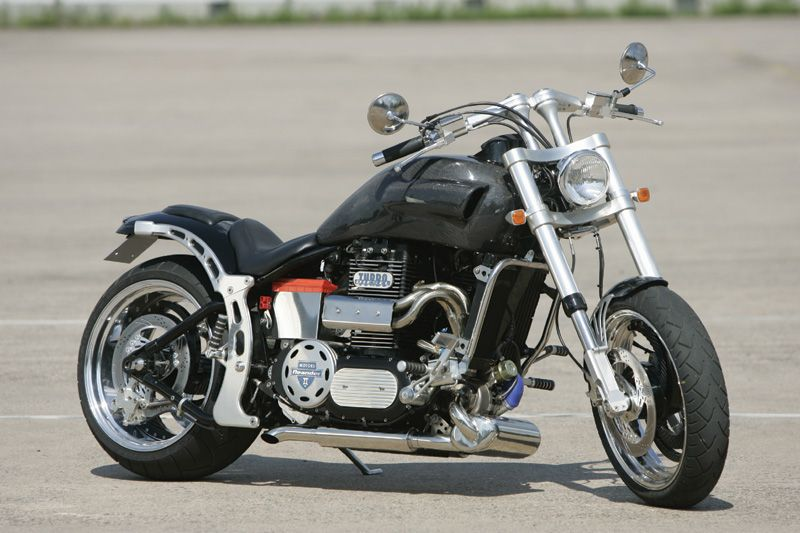
Prototype of the Neander

The Neander 1400 uses a 1430 cc parallel twin turbo-diesel engine with two gear-coupled counter-rotating crankshafts, which the manufacturer claims to remove engine vibrations.

=== Axiom Diesel Knight ===
In 2020, Axiom Diesel presented a prototype of a cruiser using an air-cooled diesel engine. In 2021, they presented the Knight at the International Motorcycle Show (IMS) in Dallas, United States, using a 1-litre turbo-diesel engine mated to a 4-speed gearbox.

=== KiraBike ===
Designed by Applied Minds, the KiraBike is designed as a companion vehicle to the Unimog-based KiraVan expedition vehicle. It uses an inline-three turbo-diesel engine paired to a CVT, and features VHF and UHF communications equipment.

== See also ==
- List of motorcycles by type of engine
