= Hatz =

German diesel engine manufacturer

Motorenfabrik Hatz GmbH & Co. KG
- Type: GmbH & Co.KG
- Industry: Mechanical engineering
- Founded: 1880 (146 years ago)
- Founder: Mathias Hatz
- Headquarters: Ruhstorf an der Rott, Germany
- Area served: Worldwide
- Key people: Christian Hatz (CEO); Wolfram Hatz (CEO)
- Products: Diesel engines, automotive components, generators, pumps
- Revenue: approx. 150 Mio. EUR (2012)
- Number of employees: approx. 1060 worldwide
- Website: www.hatz-diesel.com

Motorenfabrik Hatz is a German manufacturer of diesel engines, based in Ruhstorf an der Rott, Lower Bavaria, Germany. Especially known for its small, lightweight and robust engines, the engines are mainly used in all kinds of small construction machinery, for generators or pumps

== History ==
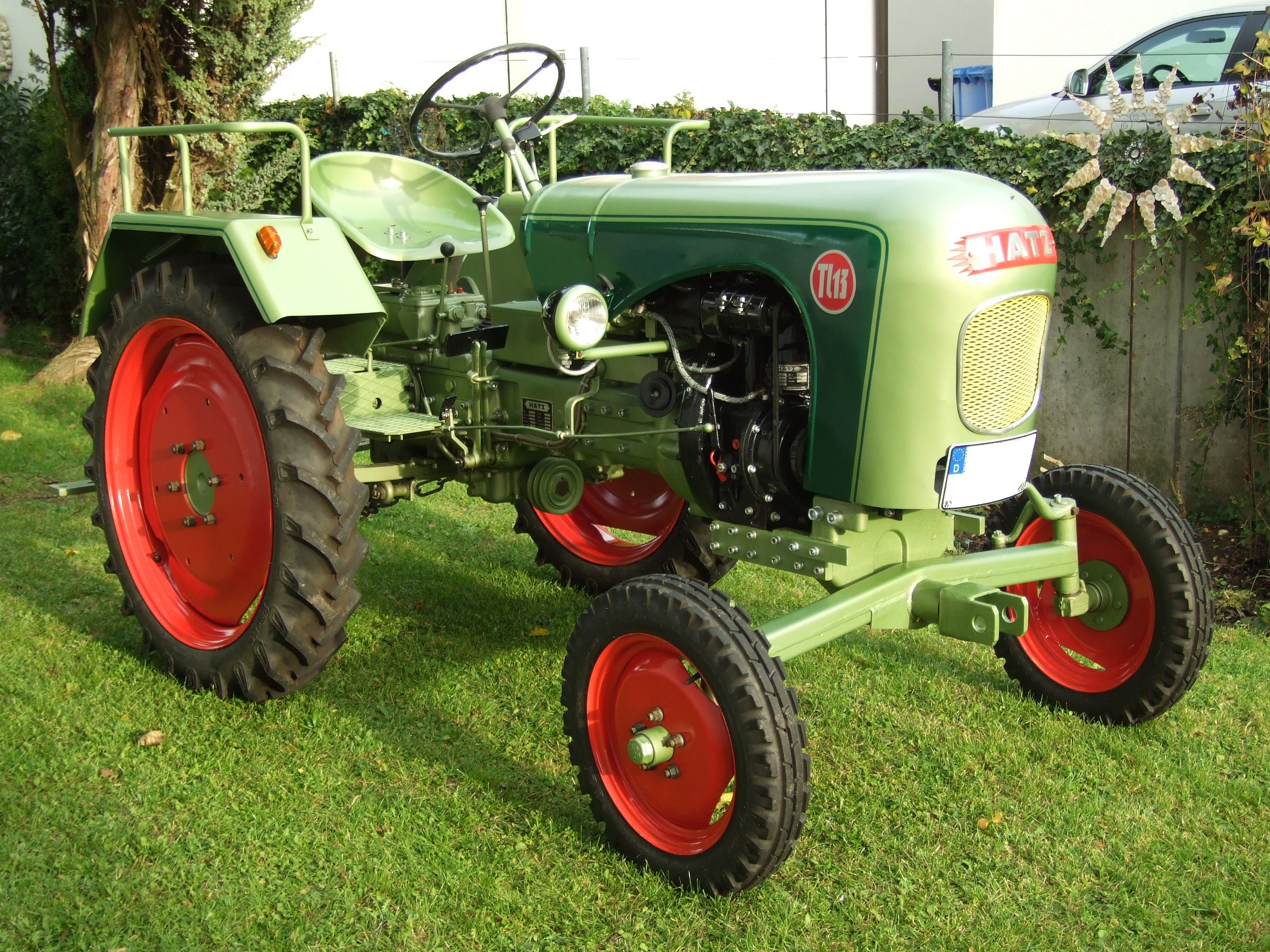
Historical Hatz tractor model TL13

Founded in 1880 by Mathias Hatz, the company began to build engines in 1904. In 1910, Hatz began to produce hot bulb engines for stationary use. Based on that engine, the first Hatz water-cooled diesel engine, the H-series, was developed (max. power: 6 kW; engine speed: 500 rpm; weight: 430 kg). Three years later, a new plant was built at the present location and Hatz started to export engines to South America. In 1936, a two stroke engine with horizontal cylinder layout, the L2, which was especially intended for the use by the construction industry (max. power: 8 kW; engine speed: 1100 rpm; weight: 360 kg) was developed.

In 1950, the first agricultural tractors were presented by Hatz. Another three years later, the first Hatz air-cooled four-stroke diesel engine was introduced, the E80 (max. power 7.5 kW; engine speed: 2000 rpm: 140 kg) which went on sale worldwide. The first high-revving diesel engine which had a housing made of light alloy, the E75 (max. power 3.5 kW), was produced from 1958 onwards. This engine, which weighed just 50 kg and ran with an engine speed of up to 3000 rpm, was the basis of the worldwide success of Hatz.

In 1966, Hatz introduced the world's smallest industrial diesel engine, the E671 (max. power 2.6 kW, engine speed: 3600 rpm; weight: 34 kg). Two years later, the production of more quite small diesel engines was launched. With the “SilentPack”, a capsuled air-cooled engine which went on sale in 1978, the noise emission was reduced by 90% in comparison to a similar uncapsuled engine. At the time of the 100th anniversary of the company, the Motorenfabrik Hatz had approx. 950 employees.

A compact two-cylinder engine, the 2G30 (max. power 15 kW; engine speed: 3000 rpm; weight: 85 kg) was introduced in 1986. Two years later, Hatz began with contract-manufacturing of automotive components like conrods, crankshafts, rocker arms, etc. Today, several million parts are produced for the automotive, agricultural and motorcycle industry.

The B-series engines, which are still the engines with the highest production volume today, were developed and introduced in the 1990s. Engines with vertical crankshaft followed shortly later.

In the 1990s, the fabrication of newly developed products started, for example the air-cooled one-cylinder diesel engines of the series 1B with vertical shaft. Due to their low weight, Hatz diesel engines are also mounted in motorcycles. The motorbike manufacturer Sommer based in Eppstein uses the one-cylinder four-stroke Hatz diesel engine 1B40 (462 cm^{3}, 8 kW/11 PS) for retrofitting of the Indian motorbike series Royal Enfield.

== Products ==
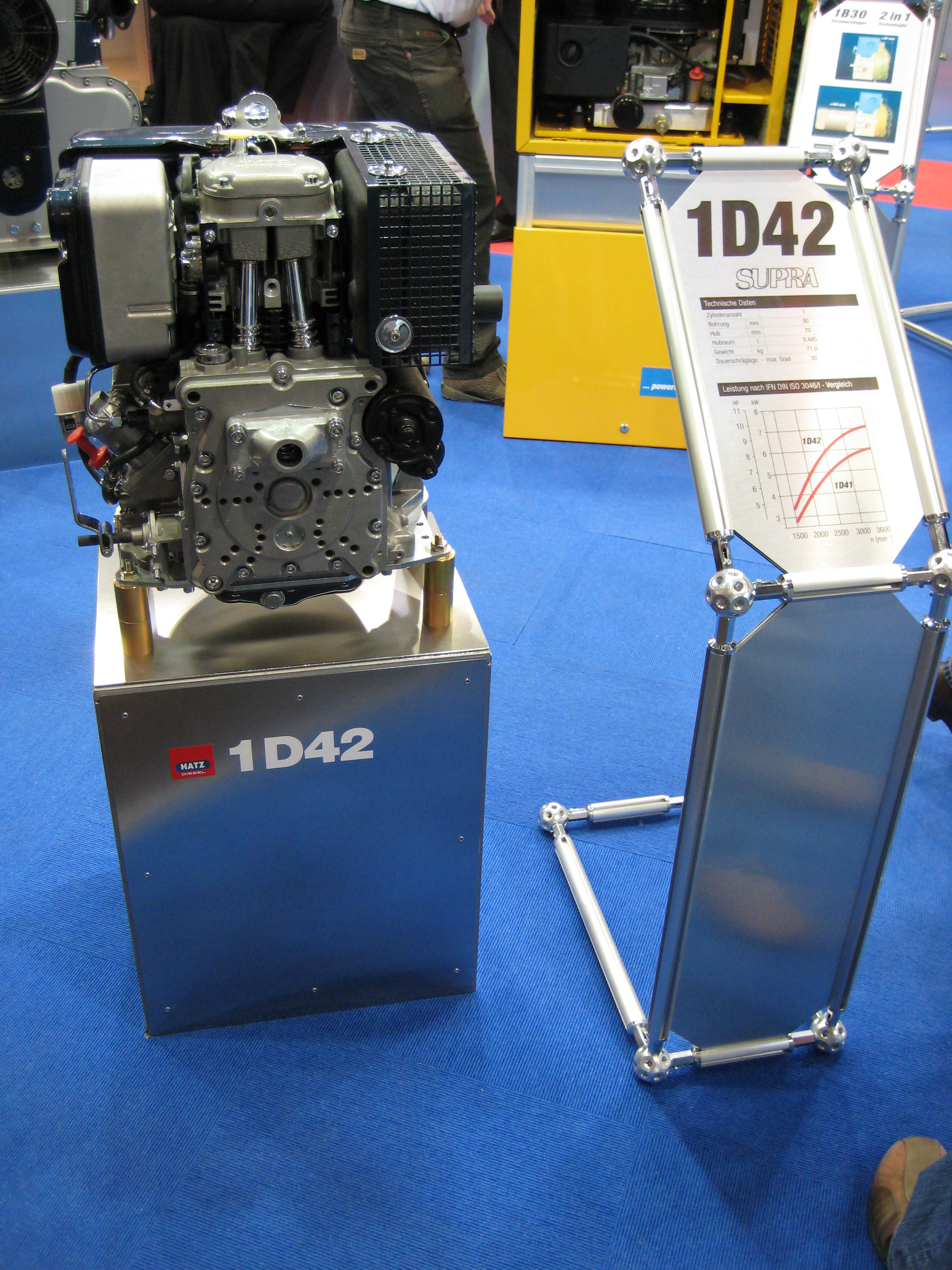
1D42

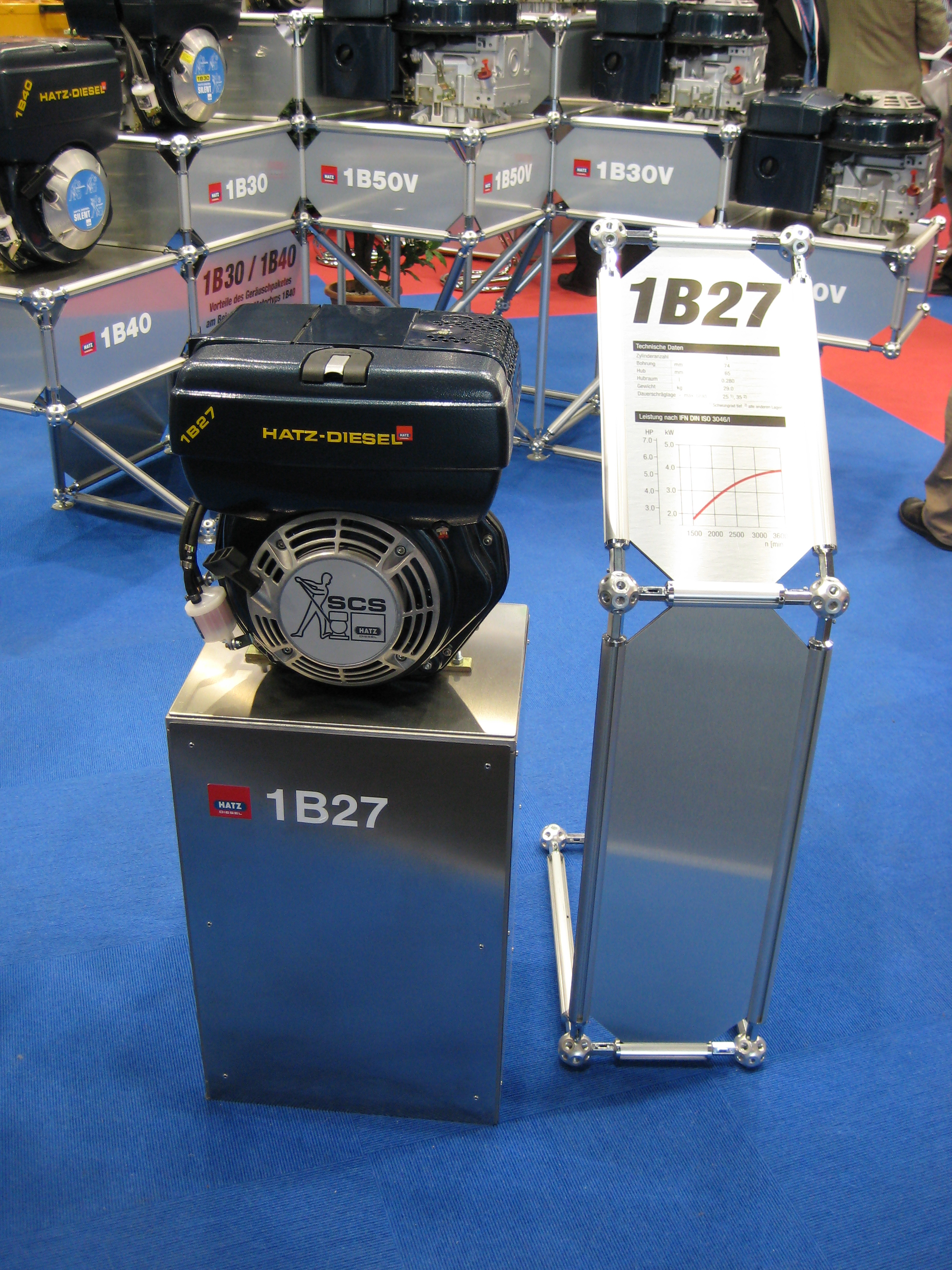
1B27

The product portfolio of Motorenfabrik Hatz comprises 3 business fields: manufacture of diesel engines, of systems and components for the automotive and commercial vehicle industry.

=== Diesel engines ===
The product portfolio of Hatz Diesel currently includes six engine series in a power range from 1.5 to 56 kW. Since 2014 a new water-cooled engine, the H-series, is on sale.

==== B-series ====
With the slogan “The challenger“, the HATZ 1B-series was presented in 1996, showing a number of technical highlights. In a minimum of space, all the important functional components of the engine such as decompression device, injection pump drive, oil pump with oil pump pressure regulator, valve train system for inlet and outlet valve, governor, speed control lever with governor spring and the multi-functional mechanical control system are integrated in the governor housing. Due to these technical features, the B-series scores with a light-weight and compact design. Depending on their cylinder capacity, the air-cooled one-cylinder diesel engines of B-series are available at power ranges from 1.5 to 7.6 kW and a maximum speed of 3600 rpm. Furthermore, models with vertical or horizontal crankshaft are available. The B-series complies with the strict requirements of EPA (Environmental Protection Agency) Tier IV final in the US.

==== D-series ====
The D-series, also referred to as SUPRA offers an even more robust design than the B-series. Therefore, the air-cooled one-cylinder diesel engines of this series are frequently mounted in compaction machines but are also used for other application fields such as generating sets for example. They have a power range of 3.5 to 15.2 kW at a maximum speed of 3600 rpm. The maximum torque is at 40.7 Nm. The SUPRA series particularly excels in its high running smoothness. This is achieved by a new design of the balance weights as well as the optimum use of two counter-rotating balance shafts and consequently a 100% first-order counterbalance. On demand, the engine may be equipped with the patented SILENT PACK ©, which reduces the noise emission by up to 90%. In addition, the engines of the D-series have up to 4 power take-off possibilities at the crank-shaft respectively auxiliary drives. Similar to the B-series, the engine is also available in a horizontal or vertical version. Furthermore, the D-series complies with the strict requirements of the EPA (Environmental Protection Agency) Tier IV final in the United States.

==== G-series ====
The G-series is notable for its low weight and ease of maintenance. The air-cooled two-cylinder diesel engine has a power range of 9.8 to 17 kW at a maximum speed of 3600 rpm and a maximum torque of 53.6 Nm. The cylinders are vertically located and may be exchanged individually. The crankcase is made of aluminium alloy. The engines of the G-series comply with the requirements of EPA(Environmental Protection Agency) Tier IV final in the US.

==== M-series ====
The M-series comprises the Hatz engines with the highest performance. Performance data of the air-cooled two-, three- or four-cylinder engines are available for a power range of 15 to 56 kW at a maximum speed of up to 3000 rpm. The maximum torque of the 4-cylinder version is 219.6 Nm. Due to the air-cooling, the engine may be operated under any climatic conditions and assures high operation reliability. In addition, the system scores with better ease of maintenance and may be easier integrated in existing applications. Since July 2013, a diesel particulate filter and exhaust gas recirculation has been available for the M-series in order to comply with the stricter exhaust gas regulations in the US (EPA Tier IV final) and the EU (Stage IIIB).

==== L-series ====
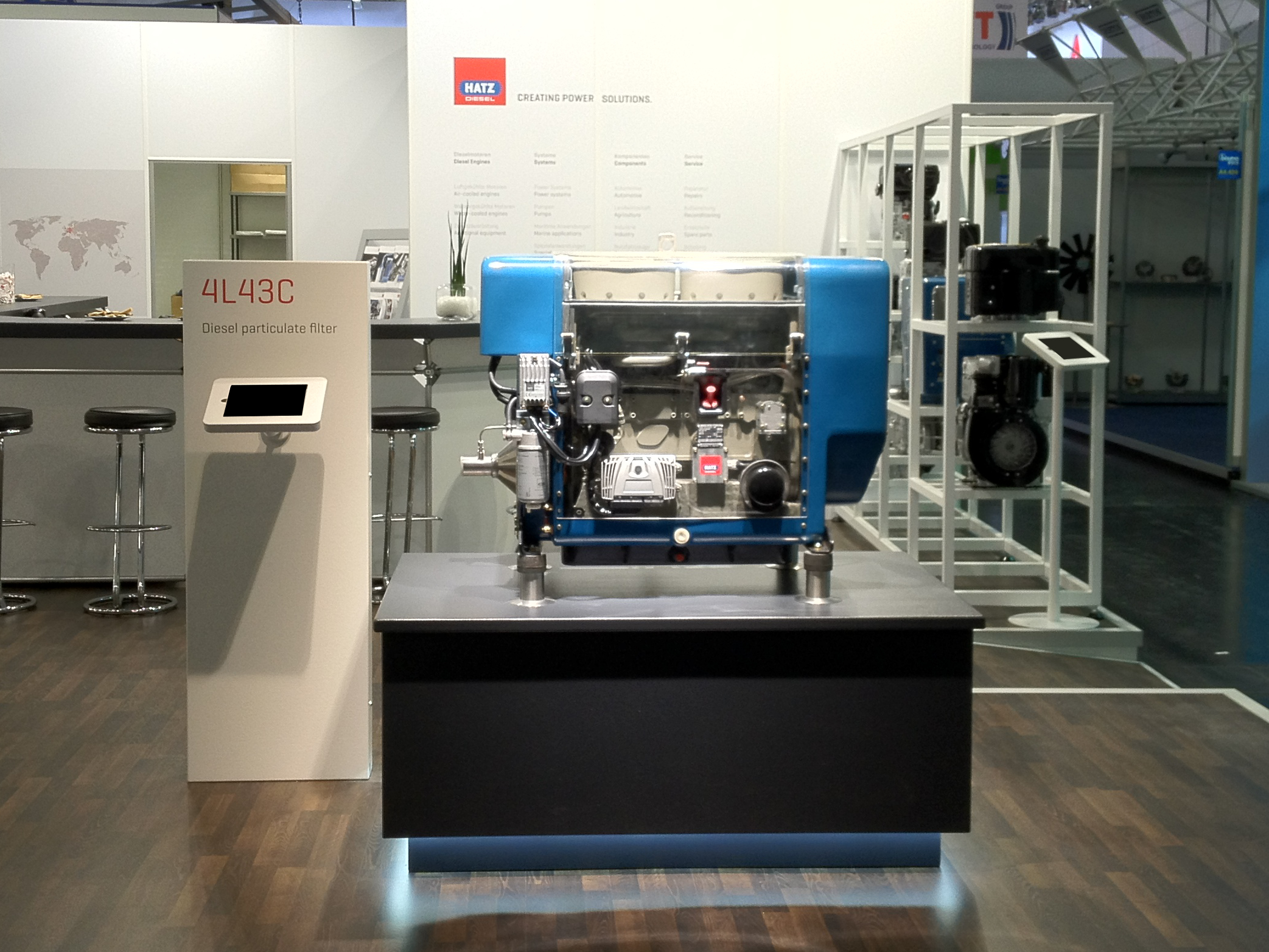
Hatz Diesel 4L43 engine with DPF.

The L-series is mostly identical to the M-series in terms of its design except for the patented SILENT PACK © of the L-series, which reduces the noise level by up to 90% compared to the non-capsulated M-series. The power of the engines, available as two-, three- or four-cylinder versions ranges from 15.0 to 54.2 kW at a speed of up to 3000 rpm. The L-series is also available with a separable diesel particulate filter in order to comply with the current exhaust gas regulation in the EU and the US. Thus, engines of the M- and L-series are the only remaining air-cooled engines with air-cooling in this power class which satisfy the exhaust gas regulation.

==== H-series ====
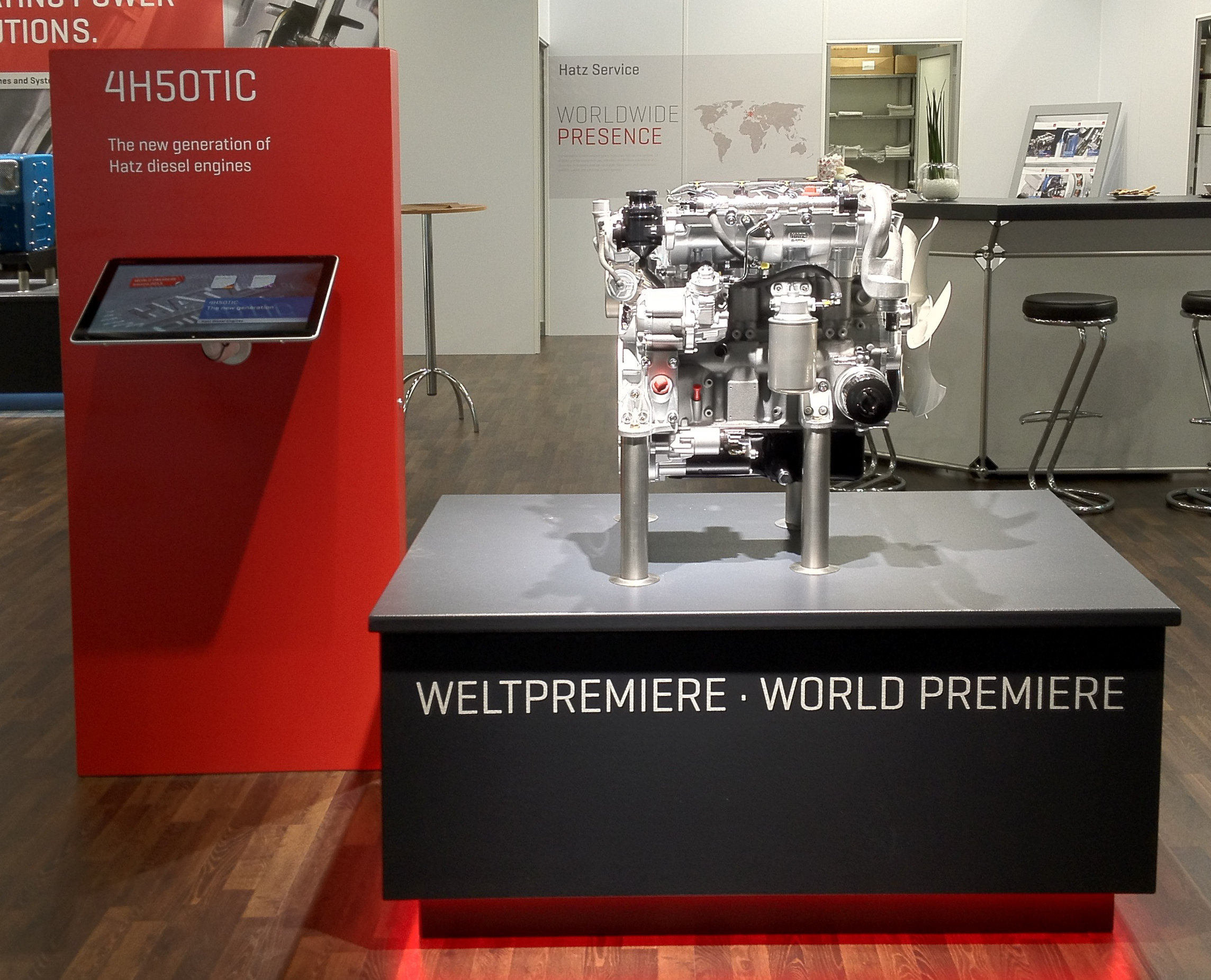
4H50TIC at the bauma 2013

Since beginning of 2014, a new engine series expands the Hatz product portfolio: the H-series. Starting with the water-cooled four-cylinder engine model 4H50TIC, Hatz relies on common rail technology, turbo charger and external exhaust gas recirculation. The turbocharged 2 litre engine achieves a maximum power of 55 kW and sets the benchmark in its power class with a weight of only 173 kg. The engine complies with the strict limit values of EU 97/68 Stage IIIB and EPA Tier 4 final without particulate filter.

=== Systems ===
The Hatz business field of Hatz Systems has developed and produced special systems on the basis of industrial diesel engines. The focus here is on solutions concerning power and energy supply, scalable electricity stations, pumping systems as well as special applications in the maritime and military sector. The range of Hatz Systems extends from 2 kW to several 100 kW power output. In the standard range popular output sizes are offered in the generator set, pumping technology and ship propulsion product groups. As well as these, however, all systems can also be designed on a customer-specific basis. The Special Applications division is particularly involved with individual concepts and customer requirements for systems with industrial engines as power source.

=== Components ===
The business field of Hatz Components produces high precision engine and drive elements such as conrods, crankshafts, casings and rotating and control parts for engine manufacturers throughout the world. The focus here is on commercial vehicle, automobile, motorcycle, agriculture and printing machine industries as well as the branches of racing and energy generation. In the production of conrods, starting from 1-cylinder engines up to heavy duty 12-cylinder applications, all conrod-specific requirements across all segments are mastered. In addition to form, oval and deep hole drilling, this also includes the crack technology as well as separation cut and profile toothing. The machining of high-strength, micro-alloyed steels, aluminium, cast iron, sintered materials is self-evident and is rounded off in particular by the machining of titanium.
