= Kawasaki KLX250S =

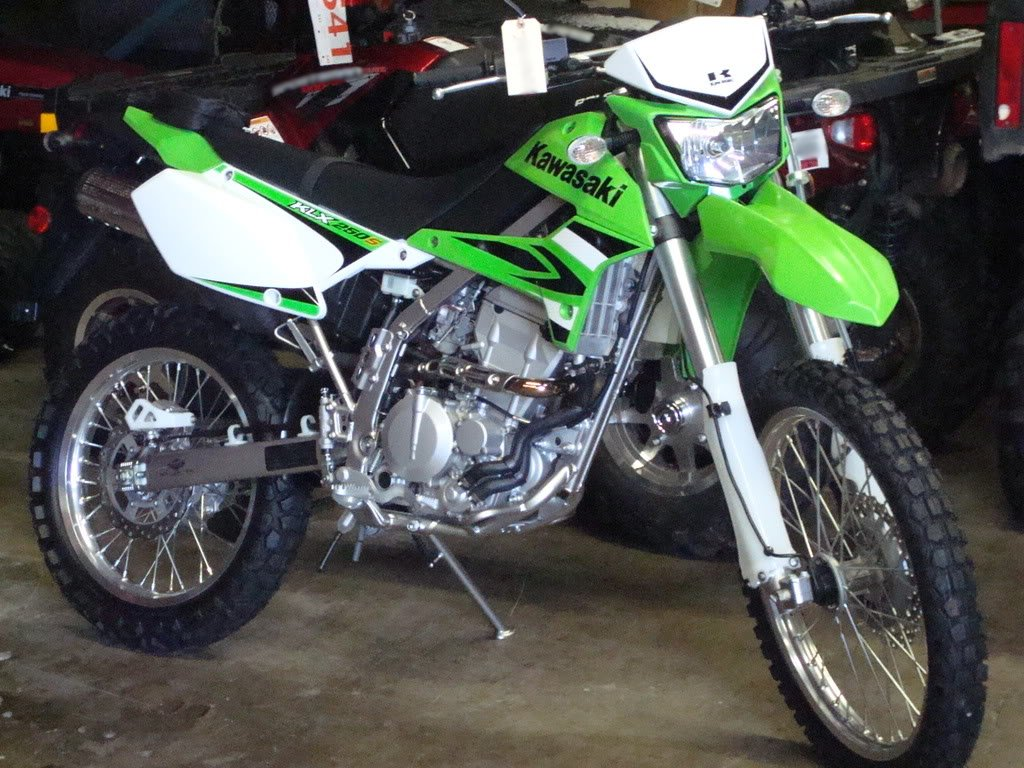
- 2009 KLX250S
- Manufacturer: Kawasaki Motors
- Parent company: Kawasaki Heavy Industries
- Production: Since 2006
- Predecessor: KLR250
- Successor: KLX300R
- Class: Dual-purpose
- Engine: 249 cc four-stroke single cylinder
- Transmission: 6 speed

The Kawasaki KLX250S is a dual-purpose motorcycle. In 2009, Kawasaki released their supermoto inspired KLX 250SF to the public. It is a relatively lightweight dual sport which can be used both on and off-road. Its 249 cc engine has a top speed of 85 miles per hour (137 km/h).

== First generation (2006-2007) ==
=== Specifications ===
Engine type	4-stroke, liquid-cooled, DOHC, 4-valve single-cylinder
Displacement	249 cc
Bore & stroke	72.0 x 61.2 mm
Compression ratio	11.0:1
Carburetor	Keihin CVK34
Ignition	Digital CDI
Transmission	6-speed
Rake/trail	26.5°/4.2 in.
Front suspension	43 mm inverted cartridge fork with 16-click compression damping adjustment
Front suspension travel	11.2 in.
Rear suspension	Uni-Trak with adjustable preload, 16-click compression and rebound damping adjustment
Rear suspension travel	11.0 in.
Front tire size	80/100-21
Rear tire size	100/100-18
Front brake type	disc
Rear brake type	disc
Wheelbase	56.5 in.
Ground clearance	11.6 in.
Seat height	34.8 in.
Dry weight	262 lb.
Fuel tank capacity	1.9 gal.

== Second generation (2009-2020) ==
=== Specifications ===
Engine Type	4-Stroke, Liquid-Cooled, DOHC, 4-Valve Single
Displacement	249 cc
Bore & Stroke	72.0 x 61.2 mm
Compression Ratio	11.0:1
Carburetor	Keihin CVK34, EFI (UK, Asian spec) (Added to US model in 2018)
Ignition	Digital CDI
Transmission	6-Speed
Rake/Trail	27.5°/4.3 in.
Front Suspension	43 mm Inverted Cartridge Fork with 16-Way Compression Damping Adjustment
Front suspension Travel	10.2 in. (285 mm)
Rear Suspension	Uni-Trak with Adjustable Preload, 16-Way Compression and Rebound Damping Adjustment
Rear suspension Travel	9.1 in. (231 mm)
Front Tire Size (S)	80/100-21 (110/70-17 on the SF version)
Rear Tire Size (S)	100/100-18 (130/70-17 on the SF version)
Front Brake Type	250 mm semi-floating petal disc with two-piston hydraulic caliper
Rear Brake Type	240 mm petal disc with single-piston hydraulic caliper
Wheelbase	56.7 in. (1440 mm)
Ground Clearance	11.0 in. (279 mm)
Seat Height	34.8 in. (88.4 cm)
Dry Weight	278 lbs (126 kg)(curb weight)
Fuel Tank Capacity	7.7 litre (2.04 US Gal)

=== Differences from previous generation ===
- All-digital instrument console
- New, stiffer seat
- New fender shape and headlight
- Thicker spokes
- Increased fuel capacity
- New swing arm design
- Less front and rear suspension travel
- Slightly less ground clearance
- Supermoto inspired KLX 250SF version available for 2009 and 2010 model years
