= Vetter Mystery Ship =

- Manufacturer: Craig Vetter
- Production: 1980
- Class: Sportbike
- Engine: 1,015 cc DOHC inline-4
- Frame type: Gusseted steel tubular frame
- Weight: 495 lb (225 kg) (dry)
- Fuel capacity: 6 US gal (23 L)

The Mystery Ship was a limited edition motorcycle created by Craig Vetter and released in 1980. Only 10 were built, of which seven were sold. An example is on display at the AMA Motorcycle Museum in Ohio, and another at Barber Vintage Motorsports Museum in Leeds, Al. The one on display at the Barber museum is #9 and is a Turbo charged model.

It was based on a Kawasaki KZ1000 motor and modified chassis, with aftermarket magnesium racing wheels, Yoshimura exhaust, and custom Vetter-designed fairing. Frame modifications took two days labor per vehicle. The $10,000 price, though described as "outrageous" at three times the price of the unmodified KZ1000, was not enough to cover production costs.

The name "Mystery Ship" was derived from the Travel Air Mystery Ship aircraft.

== Legacy and influence ==
The Mystery Ship influenced the fully faired look of modern sportbikes. Cycle World said this of the design:

The Mystery Ship's styling certainly did anticipate attempts by the Japanese manufacturers to integrate a protective fairing with the bodywork of sporting machines. Honda's technological tour de force 1981 CX500 Turbo was the bike that followed most closely in its wake. Not far behind were the turbo bikes of Yamaha, Suzuki, and Kawasaki--all of which were attempts to merge style and rider protection with performance. And this trend, when crossed with the full-fairing style of GP bikes, gave us the look of today's sportbikes.

American Motorcyclist said the Mystery Ship "set the stage for specialty motorcycle companies like Bimota."
