= Craig Vetter =

American entrepreneur and motorcycle designer (born 1942)

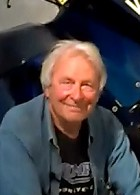
- Vetter in 2016
- Born: July 28, 1942 (age 84); Selma, Alabama, US
- Education: University of Illinois at Urbana–Champaign
- Occupation: Motorcycle designer
- Spouse: Carol Vetter
- Awards: AMA Motorcycle Hall of Fame

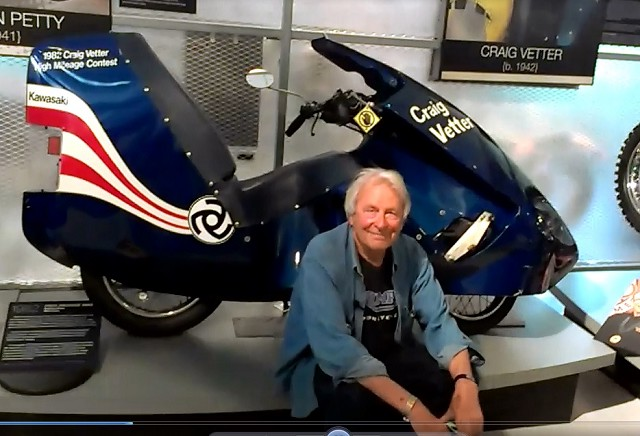
Craig Vetter posing with his 1981 streamliner at AMA Motorcycle Museum in Pickerington, OH, in July 2016.

Craig Vetter (born July 28, 1942) is an American entrepreneur and motorcycle designer. His work was acknowledged when in 1999 he was inducted into the AMA Motorcycle Hall of Fame.

His Vetter Fairing Company created aftermarket motorcycle fairings in the 1970s before manufacturers themselves included fairings on their products. The product has been cited as once being so ubiquitous that the term "Windjammer" was interchangeable with "fairing". The company at one time was the second largest motorcycle industry manufacturer in the United States, behind only Harley-Davidson.

He founded Equalizer Corp, and his innovative human-powered design won the Boston Marathon wheelchair class in 1982.

In 1998, Vetter's design for the British Triumph Hurricane was selected to be in the Guggenheim Museum's The Art of the Motorcycle exhibit which toured the world, and has since a much-valued collector's item among owners' groups.

== Education ==
Vetter graduated from the industrial design program at University of Illinois Urbana-Champaign.

== Motorcycle touring accessories ==
Vetter designed wind-cheating fairings co-ordinated with hard luggage in complementary colors. These were later produced with factory decals and fitted before delivery as a factory option.

== Notable motorcycle designs ==
The Triumph X-75 Hurricane was conceived by Vetter in 1969 as a BSA using the inclined cylinders and crankcases of the BSA Rocket 3. By the time it went into production in 1972, the BSA marque was being wound down and the bike was rebranded as a Triumph. The Hurricane has been credited with launching the cruiser category of motorcycles, factory-customized instead of customized by the consumer.

The prototype Mystery Ship was initially modeled around a Rickman Metisse frame in the mid-1970s, but the finished article was based on the 1978 team Vetter Championship-winning AMA Superbike Kawasaki ridden by Reg Pridmore. It has been described as a forerunner of the fully faired look of modern sportbikes.

The Vetter Streamliner was based on a Kawasaki Z250 touring motorcycle and demonstrated aerodynamic design in pursuit of practical fuel efficiency. It is on display at the Motorcycle Hall of Fame Museum.

== Vetter Racing ==
After designing the Hurricane in the early 1970s, from 1973 to 1976 Vetter became a Rickman dealer importing Street Metisse frame kits from UK for Triumph twins, and CR (Competition Replica) frame kits for Honda 750 and Kawasaki 900 engines.

He decided he wanted to learn to race, starting in 1975 with a 1960s Aermacchi fitted with a Yamaha YZ250 single-cylinder two-stroke engine and a Rickman CR with a Honda CB750 power plant, then progressing to a Kawasaki Z900 engined machine which was later bored-out to 1100 cc by Russ Collins.

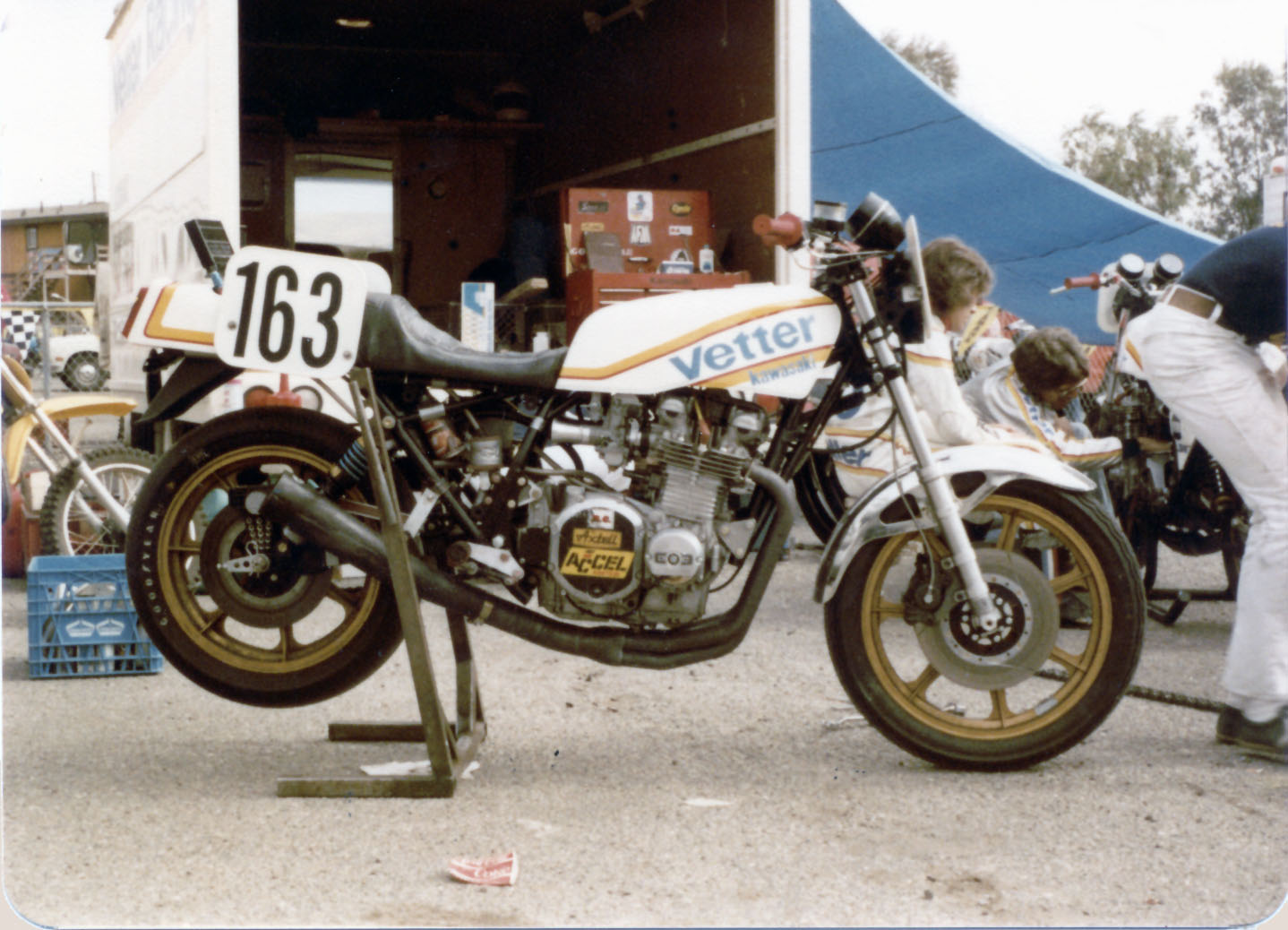
Reg Pridmore's 1979 Vetter Kawasaki Z1000 MkII at Sears Point showing Reg and Keith Code working on a bike

Vetter entered the Rickman Kawasaki into the AMA Cafe Bike class, aggregating good points at mid-West tracks during the 1975 season culminating with a third-place in the Amateur Production/Cafe class at the Daytona Final during the Speed Week in March 1976.

In 1976, Vetter crashed his Yamaha RD350 when racing at Road Atlanta suffering a significant leg injury.

Wanting to run a team, Vetter procured the services of English-born AMA Superbike Championship winner Reg Pridmore for the 1978 season to ride a team Vetter Kawasaki Z1000 prepared by (the late) Pierre Des Roches. Pridmore became the 1978 Superbike Champion to add to his previous 1976 and 1977 titles, and again rode for Vetter in 1979.

== Wheelchairs ==
In addition to motorcycles, he has also designed a racing wheelchair manufactured and sold by his Equalizer Corp. One of these chairs took Jim Knaub to a first-place finish and world record at the 1982 Boston Marathon.

== Vetter Fuel Economy Challenge and streamlining ==
From 1980 to 1985 Vetter turned his attention to attaining increased fuel economy by way of streamlined fairings, sponsoring the Craig Vetter Fuel Economy Challenge where contestants were able to enter their own original design concepts. After a 25-year break, the contest resumed from 2011 with revised Vetter Fuel Challenge rules allowing for alternative fuel categories and requiring street usability including goods-carrying capability.

== Personal life ==
On August 12, 2015, Vetter suffered serious life-changing injuries after colliding with a deer when riding his personal streamlined Honda CN250 Helix scooter near to his home in California. In 2016 he was awarded the AMA Dud Perkins Lifetime Achievement Award.

Vetter was on the Board of Directors of the American Motorcycle Heritage Foundation from 2008 to 2013, a cash donor to the AMHF, and Chairman of the Motorcycle Hall of Fame Design and Engineering Committee.
