= Vetter Fairing Company =

- Industry: Motorcycle accessories
- Founded: Rantoul, Illinois, USA (November 1966)
- Defunct: 1983
- Fate: Assets acquired by Bell-Riddell Inc.
- Number of locations: 2nd plant in San Luis Obispo, CA made saddle bags, tail trunks and the smaller Quicksilver fairing and shipped Windjammers to western US. Peak employment in San Luis Obispo 340
- Key people: Craig Vetter, founder
- Production output: 10,000 original Windjammer; 25,000 Windjammer II; 75,000 Windjammer III; 150,000 Windjammer SS
- Number of employees: c. 500

The Vetter Fairing Company was a manufacturer of motorcycle accessories including the Windjammer series of motorcycle fairings. The business was founded by Craig Vetter in 1966, sold in 1978, and went bankrupt in 1983. Bell-Riddell Inc. acquired the assets, and produced fairings for a few years.

Their fairings and trunk/hard bag setups were frequently used to turn a "standard" (no fairing or luggage) motorcycle into a "full bagger" (AKA full dress) setup in the times before Honda started producing full baggers from the factory. With the advent of the full dress Goldwing, Calvalcade, Venture, and others, demand for an aftermarket solution reduced and Vetter went out of business.

== Notes and references ==
=== References ===
- Assoc, American Motorcyclist (August 2000), "Against the Wind: How Craig Vetter changed motorcycling", American Motorcyclist: 33–42
- Holter, James (August 2012), "Craig Vetter, motorcycling's most free-thinking inventor", American Motorcyclist: 40–45
