= Craig Vetter Fuel Economy Challenge =

Motorcycle fuel efficiency contest

- Genre: Motorcycle rally/technology demonstration
- Frequency: Annually
- Locations: Ohio, California, Nevada
- Inaugurated: 1980
- Founder: Craig Vetter
- Most recent: July 13, 2014
- Next event: October 11, 2014 (San Luis Obispo to Carmel, California)
- Website: Craig Vetter Fuel Economy Challenge

The Craig Vetter Fuel Economy Challenge is a motorcycle fuel efficiency contest created in 1980 by motorcycle fairing inventor Craig Vetter. The contest was cited in Vetter's Motorcycle Hall of Fame induction.

The contest initially ran from 1980 to 1985, with the inaugural run from Colorado Springs to Cripple Creek, Colorado. After a 25-year break, the contest resumed from 2011 with revised Vetter Fuel Challenge rules allowing for alternative fuel categories and requiring street usability including goods-carrying capability. This is considered a particularly important future need for electric motorcycles like the Zero, where battery constraints limit usable range, and the need for lengthy recharging cycles at public electrical points punctuates journeys and necessitates careful trip planning.

A streamlined motorcycle designed by Charly Perethian with a 185 cc Yamaha motor achieved 372 miles per US gallon (0.632 L/100 km; 447 mpg_{‑imp}) at the 1983 challenge, and is now displayed in the Smithsonian Institution.

== Results ==
Winners by year are tabulated below. Data as published by Craig Vetter at the contest website. All vehicles are full faired streamliners unless noted.

Year	Location	Winner	Fuel economy	Model	Notes
1980	Colorado Springs–Cripple Creek, Colorado	Lammy Johnstone	97.9 mpg_{‑US} (2.40 L/100 km; 117.6 mpg_{‑imp})	1000 cc Harley-Davidson	
1981	Templeton–Cambria, California	Mike Hishki	189 mpg_{‑US} (1.24 L/100 km; 227 mpg_{‑imp})	Honda Passport	Matt Guzzetta/Don Vesco "Project 200" streamliner entered, disqualified
1982	San Luis Obispo–Monterey, California	Charly Perethian	282 mpg_{‑US} (0.83 L/100 km; 339 mpg_{‑imp})	185 cc 1982 Yamaha	Vehicle now in Smithsonian
1983	Carmel–Carmel, California	Charly Perethian	372 mpg_{‑US} (0.632 L/100 km; 447 mpg_{‑imp})	185 cc 1982 Yamaha	Vehicle now in Smithsonian
1984	Carmel–Carmel	Masakazu Matsuzawa	377 mpg_{‑US} (0.624 L/100 km; 453 mpg_{‑imp})	Honda XL 125	Record 557 mpg_{‑US} (0.422 L/100 km; 669 mpg_{‑imp}) achieved by Dan Hannebrink on first stage
1985	Carmel–Big Sur–Laguna Seca	Masakazu Matsuzawa	470 mpg_{‑US} (0.50 L/100 km; 560 mpg_{‑imp})	1980 Honda XL 80	

Results from the 2010s can not be directly compared as there was a major rule change that required a minimum cargo capacity and minimum top speed. Additionally, winners were declared by cost spent on pump gas (or electricity), not strictly mileage, significant as there is a mix of motor types.

Craig Vetter hit a deer while riding his stream-lined Honda Helix on August 14, 2015. To help him stay focused on his recovery, volunteers helped coordinate and document the 2015 and 2016 Vetter Challenge Rides in Ohio.

Year	Location	Winner	Fuel economy	Model	Notes
October 2010	San Luis Obispo	Winner (by MPG)/Second place (by fuel cost)	089.5 mpg_{‑US} (2.63 L/100 km; 107.5 mpg_{‑imp})	Hayes Diesel motorcycle (not streamlined)	First public demonstration; bio-diesel
October 2010	San Luis Obispo	Winner (by cost of fuel consumed)	081.4 mpg_{‑US} (2.89 L/100 km; 97.8 mpg_{‑imp})	Custom Ninja 250-engined trike	
May 2011	Carmel	Fred Hayes	128 mpg_{‑US} (1.84 L/100 km; 154 mpg_{‑imp})	Hayes MD670F2 Diesel motorcycle (semi faired)	
July 2011	Lexington, Ohio	Max Perethian	157 mpg_{‑US} (1.50 L/100 km; 189 mpg_{‑imp})	1989 Honda NX250 (semi faired)	1982–1983 winner Charly Perethian designed; son rode machine Stock bike got 86 mpg on tests before streamlining
November 2011	Las Vegas to Barstow	Fred Hayes	133.2 mpg_{‑US} (1.766 L/100 km; 160.0 mpg_{‑imp})	Diesel streamliner (rider semi exposed)	Achieved second place with 143.53 mpg at prior contest
May 2012	Carmel	Fred Hayes	109.6 mpg_{‑US} (2.146 L/100 km; 131.6 mpg_{‑imp})	Diesel streamliner (rider semi exposed)	
July 2012	Lexington, Ohio	Fred Hayes	143.6 mpg_{‑US} (1.638 L/100 km; 172.5 mpg_{‑imp})	Diesel streamliner (rider semi exposed)	Electric motorcycle entrant had lower cost per mile but did not meet cargo requirement.
November 2012	Las Vegas to Barstow	Fred Hayes	125.92 mpg_{‑US} (1.8680 L/100 km; 151.22 mpg_{‑imp})	Diesel streamliner (rider semi exposed)	
May 2013	Carmel	Fred Hayes	149.68 mpg_{‑US} (1.5714 L/100 km; 179.76 mpg_{‑imp})	Diesel streamliner (rider semi exposed)	
July 2013	Lexington, Ohio	Fred Hayes	162.5 mpg_{‑US} (1.447 L/100 km; 195.2 mpg_{‑imp})	Diesel streamliner (rider semi exposed)	
July 2014	Lexington, Ohio	Alan Smith	181.6 mpg_{‑US} (1.295 L/100 km; 218.1 mpg_{‑imp})	Kawasaki Ninja 250 (rider semi exposed, Vetter fairing)	
August 2014	Wendover to Tooele, Utah	Terry Hershner (winner, cost basis)	116.5 watt-hours/mile	Zero Motorcycles electric customized with 20 kW-Hr of batteries, and Vetter Fairing	80 mph speed limits. 171 mile ride This was the first time an electric motorcycle was able to complete a Vetter Challenge with the liquid fuel bikes. At all other events, the electric motorcycles lacked range to complete the course with the group and were disqualified from winning the overall lowest fuel cost per mile. Hershner $.017/mile fuel cost Hayes $.023/mile fuel cost Smith $.026/mile fuel cost
August 2014	Wendover to Tooele, Utah	Alan Smith (winner, pump fuel)	139.3 mpg_{‑US} (1.689 L/100 km; 167.3 mpg_{‑imp})	Kawasaki Ninja 250 (rider semi exposed, Vetter fairing)	80 mph speed limits. 171 mile ride This was the first time an electric motorcycle was able to complete a Vetter Challenge with the liquid fuel bikes. At all other events, the electric motorcycles lacked range to complete the course with the group and were disqualified from winning the overall lowest fuel cost per mile. Hershner $.017/mile fuel cost Hayes $.023/mile fuel cost Smith $.026/mile fuel cost
August 2014	Wendover to Tooele, Utah	Fred Hayes (winner, alternate fuel [biodiesel])	164.0 mpg_{‑US} (1.434 L/100 km; 197.0 mpg_{‑imp})	Diesel streamliner (rider semi exposed)	80 mph speed limits. 171 mile ride This was the first time an electric motorcycle was able to complete a Vetter Challenge with the liquid fuel bikes. At all other events, the electric motorcycles lacked range to complete the course with the group and were disqualified from winning the overall lowest fuel cost per mile. Hershner $.017/mile fuel cost Hayes $.023/mile fuel cost Smith $.026/mile fuel cost
October 2014	San Luis Obispo to Salinas, California	Vic Valdes (winner, pump fuel and overall)	187.0 mpg-US	Kawasaki Ninja 250 (rider semi exposed, Vetter fairing)	$.0176 / mile (winner of pump fuel and overall winner of this event having lowest fuel cost per mile)
October 2014	San Luis Obispo to Salinas, California	Terry Hershner (winner, electric)	138 watt-hours/mile	Zero Motorcycles electric (with Vetter fairing - missing windshield and front turret causing higher than normal fuel usage).	$.0225 / mile
July 2015	Mike Corbin Appreciation Ride, California	Alan Smith (winner pump fuel and overall)	177.0 mpg-US	Kawasaki Ninja 250 (rider semi exposed, Vetter fairing)	$.0203 / mile
July 2015	Mike Corbin Appreciation Ride, California	Terry Hershner (winner electric)	125.4 watt-hours/mile	Zero Motorcycle Electric (without fairing)	$.0219 / mile
July 2015	Lexington, Ohio	Alan Smith (winner pump fuel)	161 mpg - US	Kawasaki Ninja 250 (rider semi exposed, Vetter Fairing)	$.0174 / mile
July 2016	Lexington, Ohio	Vic Valdes (winner pump fuel and overall)	187 mpg - US	Kawasaki Ninja 250 (rider semi exposed, Vetter fairing)	$.0110 / mile
July 2016	Lexington, Ohio	Kraig Schultz (winner electric)	92 watt-hours/mile	Custom Built Electric with Vetter Fairing from the 1980's with Airplane Canopy	$.0126 / mile
July 2017	Lexington, Ohio	Vic Valdes (winner pump fuel and overall)	236 mpg - US	Kawasaki Ninja 250 (rider semi exposed, Vetter fairing)	$.0097 / mile
July 2017	Lexington, Ohio	Virginia Tech (winner electric)	101.9 watt-hours/mile	Zero Motorcycles Electric (with Vetter fairing and custom tail built by Virginia Tech student team)	$.0134 / mile

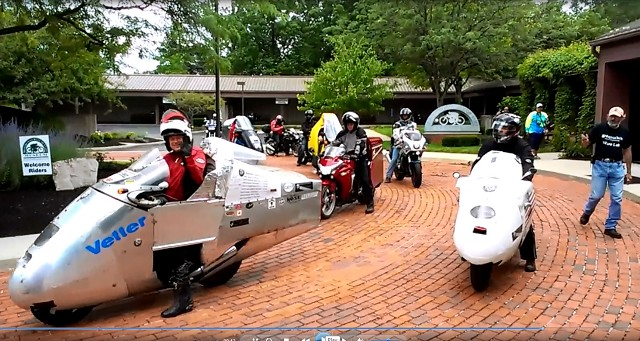
Winning Vehicle (Silver Streamliner) for July 2015 Vetter Challenge in Lexington, Ohio. 2005 Ninja 250 with Vetter Fairing, 161 mpg Bike built by and ridden by Alan Smith. Picture taken by Kraig Schultz at AMA Motorcycle Museum. White bike to right is Vic Valdes (2nd place, 152mpg) and Maroon Bike to rear is Scott Endler (3rd place 117mpg)

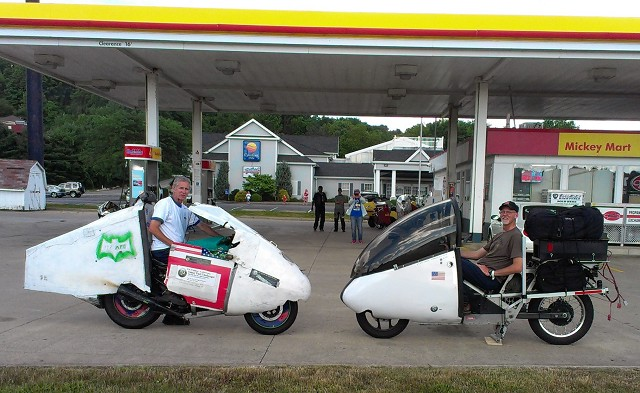
Winning Vehicles for July 2016 Vetter Challenge in Lexington, Ohio. Bike to Left is 1999 Ninja 250 with Vetter Fairing, 187 mpg Bike built by and ridden by Vic Valdes. Bike to Right is 2011 Custom Electric with 1980’s Rifle/Vetter Fairing Built and Ridden by Kraig Schultz 92 Wh/Mile.

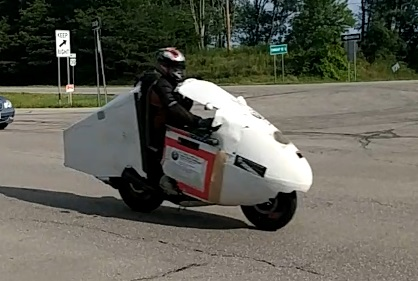
Winning Gas Vehicle for July 2017 Vetter Challenge in Lexington, Ohio. 1999 Ninja 250 with Vetter Fairing, 236 mpg Bike built and ridden by Vic Valdes. 2017-07-08

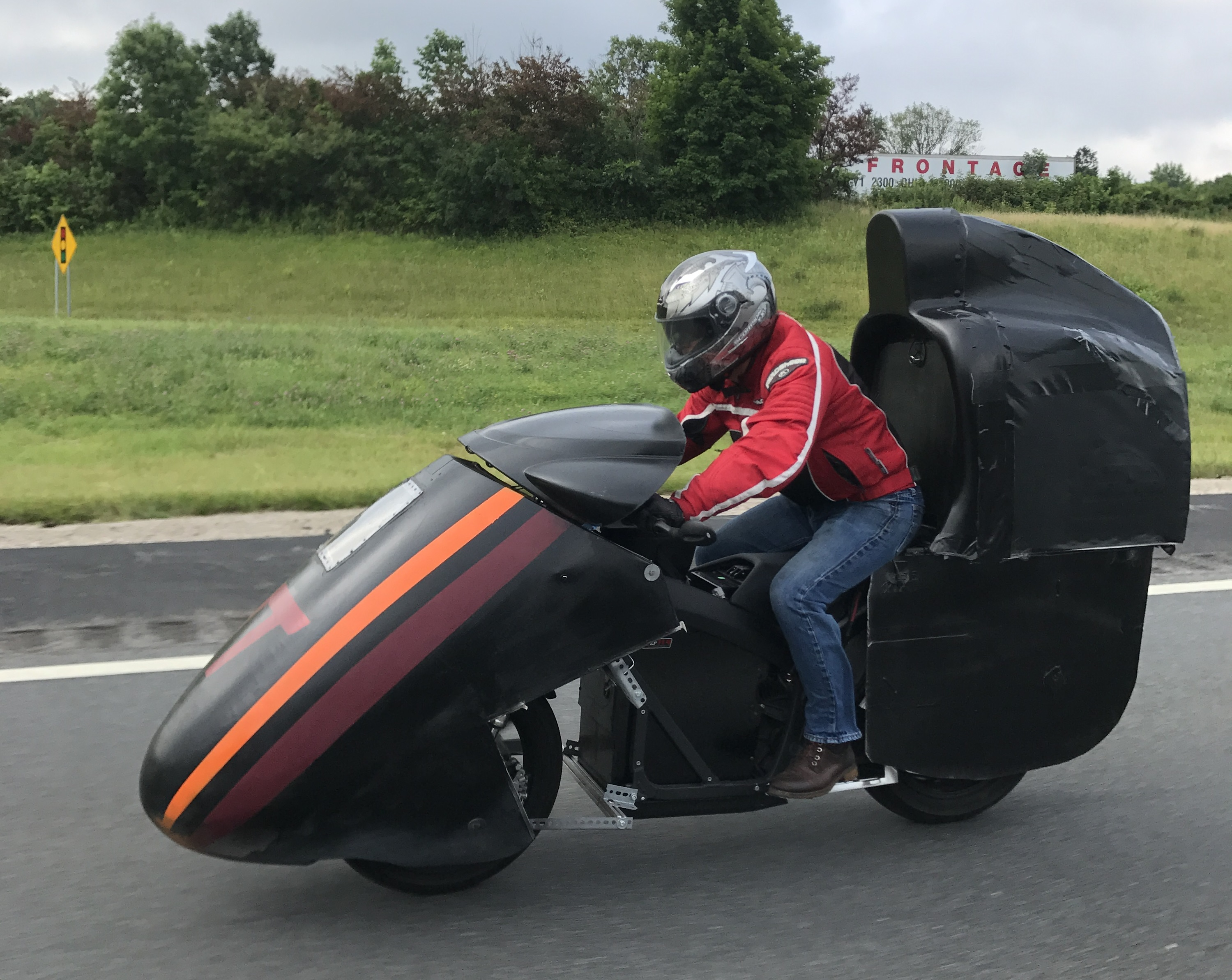
Winning Electric Vehicle for July 2017 Vetter Challenge in Lexington, Ohio. 2014 Zero S with Vetter Fairing, 101.9 Wh/mile built by Virginia Tech Students and ridden by Jacob Dennis. 2017-07-08

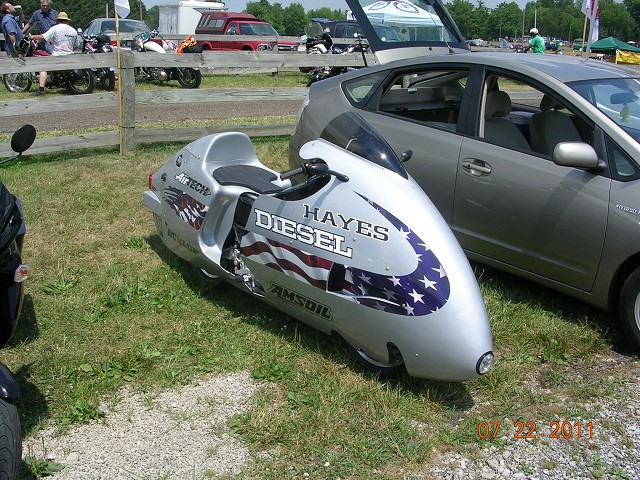
Winning Overall and Diesel Vehicle Categories for 2011, 2012 and 2013 Vetter Challenges in Ohio and California/Nevada. Hayes Diesel Engine with Airtech Fairing, 109-164 mpg bio fuel. Bike built and ridden by Fred Hayes. This Picture was taken by Kraig Schultz in July 2011. In 2012, external saddle bags were added to rear of bike.

Pictures of Winning Vehicles:

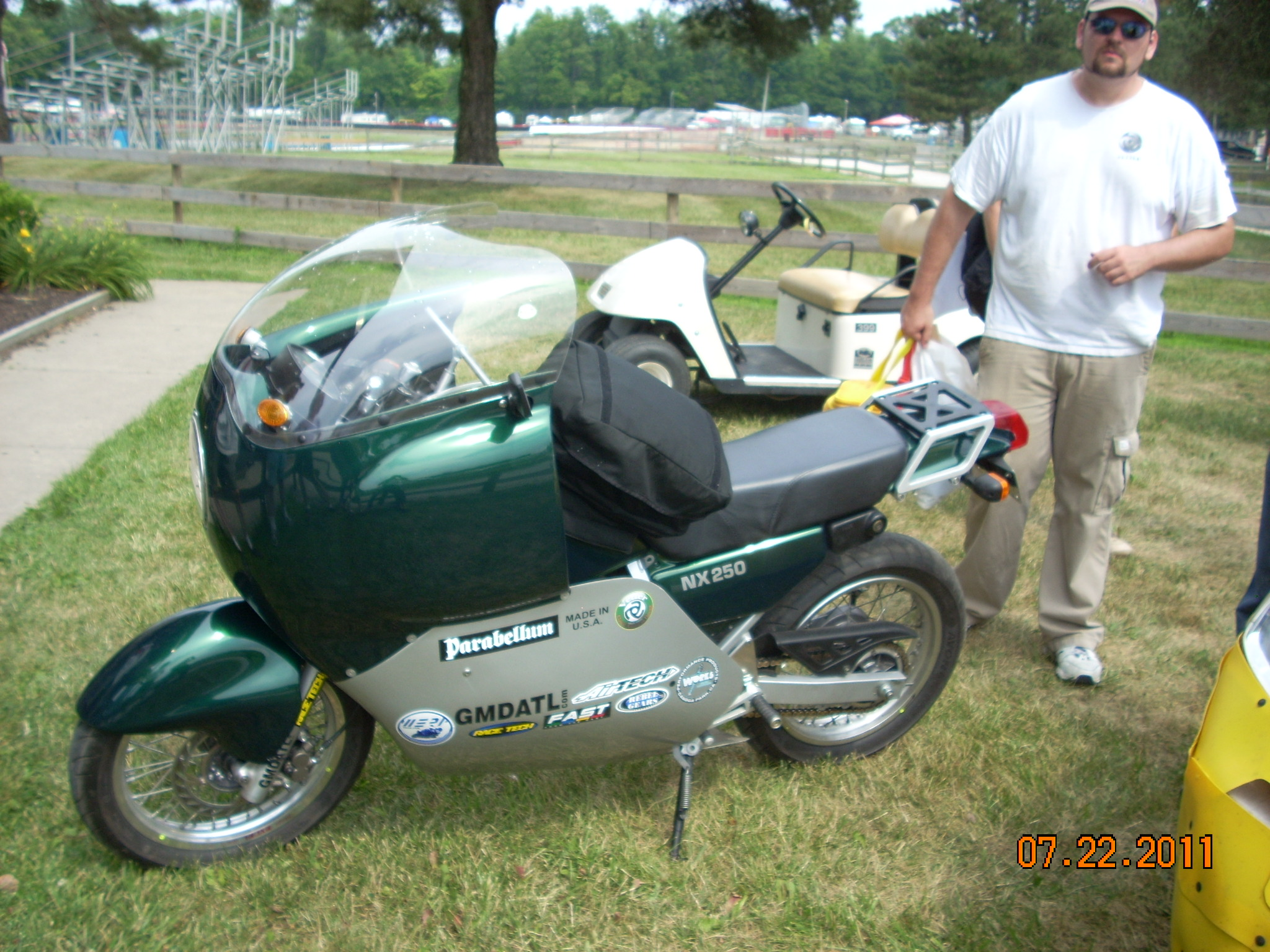
Winning Vehicle for July 2011 Vetter Challenge in Lexington, Ohio. 1989 Honda NX250 with Parabellum Fairing, 157mpg Bike built by Charly Perethian; ridden by Max Perethian. Morgan Vetter is Standing Next to Bike.
