= Kawasaki KLR650 =

Sport motorcycle

The Kawasaki KLR650 is a 652 cc (39.8 cu in) dual-sport motorcycle intended for both on-road and off-road riding. It was a long-standing model in Kawasaki's lineup, having been introduced in 1987 to replace the 564 cc (34.4 cu in) 1984–1986 Kawasaki KLR600, and remaining almost unchanged through the 2007 model. The 2008 model was the first significant redesign of the KLR650 since its inception. It was built with a 652 cc four-stroke, DOHC, dual-counterbalanced, single-cylinder, liquid-cooled engine. The second significant redesign in 2022 added new features such as electronic fuel injection and an anti-lock braking system.

The KLR is widely used as an inexpensive adventure/touring bike. The addition of luggage and personalized modifications (GPS, heated handgrips, larger windscreens) make it more functional on long trips. The bikes have been used for long distance and intercontinental trips, as well as full global circumnavigation rides e.g., by Dr. Gregory Frazier in 2001 and 2002.

== First generation (1987–2007) ==
Kawasaki KLR650
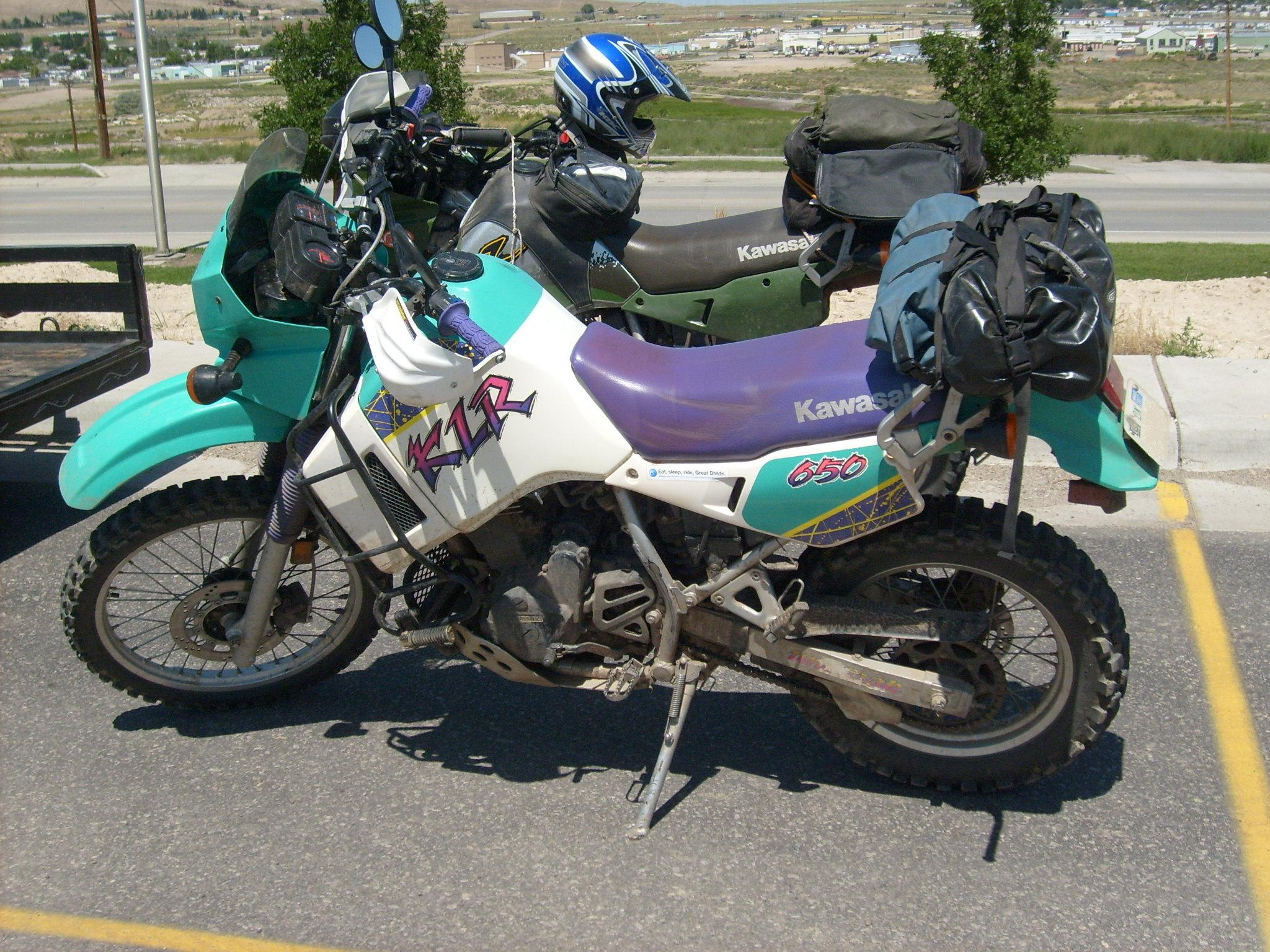
- 1995 KLR650
- Manufacturer: Kawasaki
- Production: 1987–2007
- Assembly: Japan (1987–2001); Rayong, Thailand (2001–2007)
- Engine: 652 cc single, liquid-cooled, 4-stroke, DOHC, 4-valves
- Bore / stroke: 100 mm × 83 mm (3.9 in × 3.3 in)
- Compression ratio: 9.5:1
- Power: 36.5 hp (27.2 kW) @ 6,100 rpm
- Torque: 35.2 lb⋅ft (47.7 N⋅m) @ 4,600 rpm
- Ignition type: Electric start
- Fuel delivery: Keihin CVK-40 constant velocity carburetor
- Transmission: wet, 5 speed
- Suspension: Front 38mm Telescoping; Rear: Uni-Trak swingarm
- Brakes: Front: disc Rear: disc
- Rake, trail: 28°, 111 mm (4.4 in)
- Wheelbase: 58.3 in (1,480 mm)
- Dimensions: L: 2,295 mm (90.4 in); W: 960 mm (38 in); H: 1,350 mm (53 in)
- Seat height: 35 in (890 mm)
- Weight: 337 lb (153 kg) (dry); 416 lb (189 kg) (wet)
- Fuel capacity: 6.1 US gal (23 L; 5.1 imp gal)
- Oil capacity: 2.6 US qt (2,500 ml)

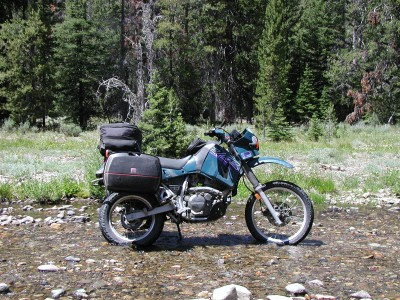
1998 KLR650

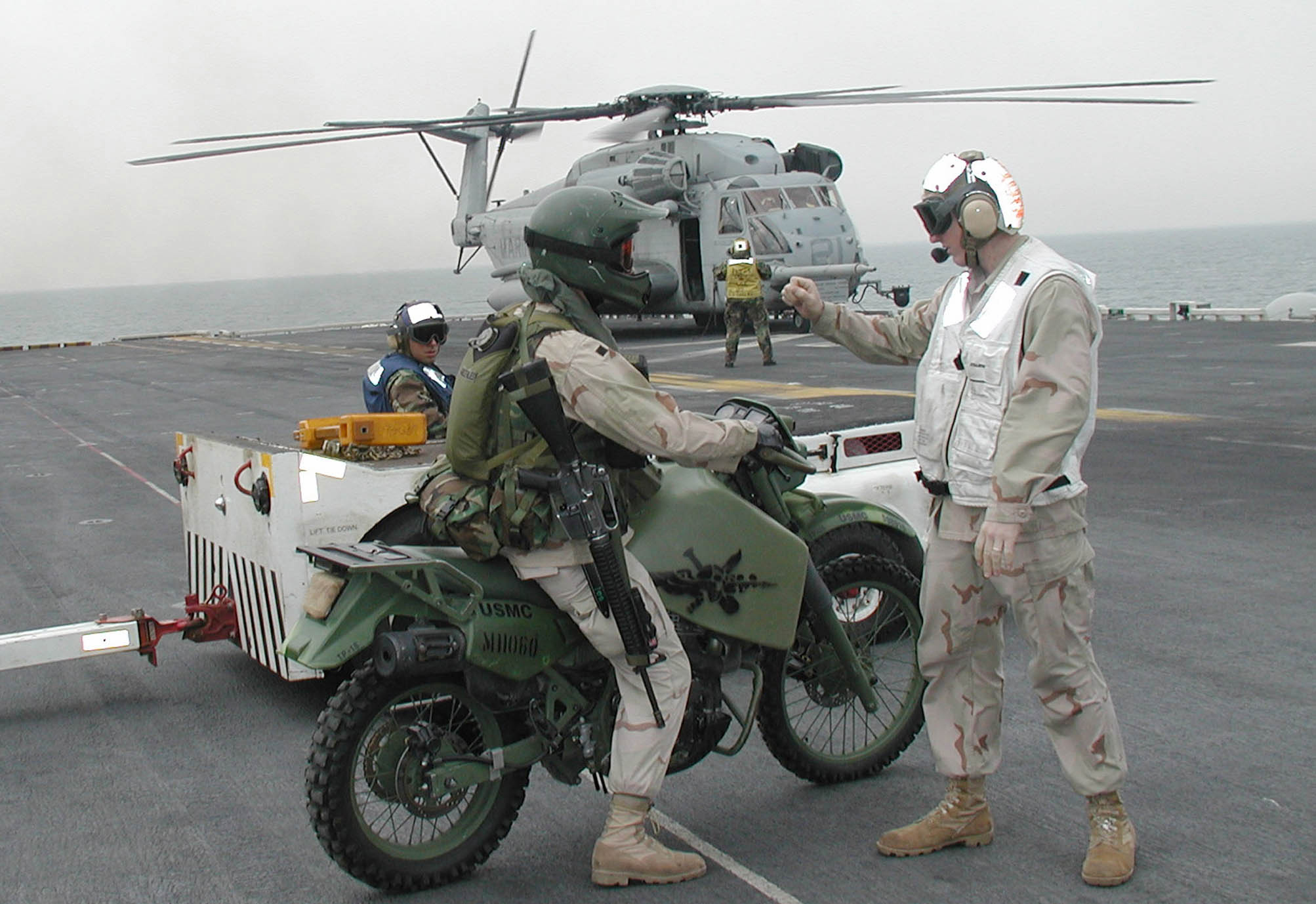
US Marine Corps KLR650 preparing to load onto a helicopter, 2003.

Variants

- KLR650-A: The "A" model was introduced in 1987, based on its KLR600 predecessor (1984 to 1986). The "A" model remained nearly unchanged until the introduction of the 2008 model in USA, Canada, Australia and South Africa. It is not sold in Europe due to emission regulations.
- KLR650-B or Tengai: The Tengai got Adventure/Dakar styling, a full fairing blending into the tank, different sidepanels, and an unsprung front mudguard. It was sold in the US starting 1990 and in other countries for two years afterward – this could be classified as a separate model in its own right as the others are more trail bike orientated. Its name "Tengai" is a traditional Japanese saying which means "The End of The Sky."
- KLR650-C: The "C" model gets completely new bodywork and is a more dirt-oriented motorcycle fitted with stiffer 41 mm (1.6 in) front forks, improved brakes, tubular engine guard, smaller 14 L (3.1 imp gal; 3.7 US gal) fuel tank, and steel wheel rims. Lacking a temperature gauge, it has an over-heat lamp.
- The U.S. Military has KLR650s modified by Hayes Diversified Technologies to burn military-spec fuels including diesel. (M1030M1) All-new engines were designed to replace the 4-stroke gasoline engines. The new engines employ the original unit-construction main cases and transmission, but with new piston, cylinder, and other components. The balancing system that is used in the gasoline KLR650 engines (to reduce engine vibration) was removed from the military diesel KLR engines. Some components of the military diesel version can be applied to "civilian" KLR650 models, such as the nonspillable absorbed glass mat battery which offers several advantages over the conventional unsealed KLR batteries.

Incremental changes

Aside from livery/colors, the 1st Generation KLR650 did not change much between its 1987 introduction and the 2008 redesign. The key differences are:

- 1987: Crankshaft is unique to this year.
- 1988: Beefed up the engine cases with extra bolts between the crank and countershaft; crank has a different part number, and may be lighter.
- 1990: Countershaft improved with longer splines for increased engagement with sprocket.
- 1992: Changes to front brake master cylinder.
- Mid-1996: Changed valve cover, added bracket to hold cam chain bumper; changed crank to heavier unit; improved clutch basket with 1 more clutch plate; changed countershaft sprocket retainer from slotted plate to large nut; changed second and third gear ratios. Kickstarter no longer fits with new clutch basket. At least some early 1996 models had the matte black engine cases and covers rather than the later hammer-finished dark gray coloration found in the 1997 and later models.
- 2001: Around this time final assembly moved from Japan to Thailand. All major parts still made in Japan.
- 2007: New shift lever

== Second generation (2008–2018) ==
Kawasaki KLR650
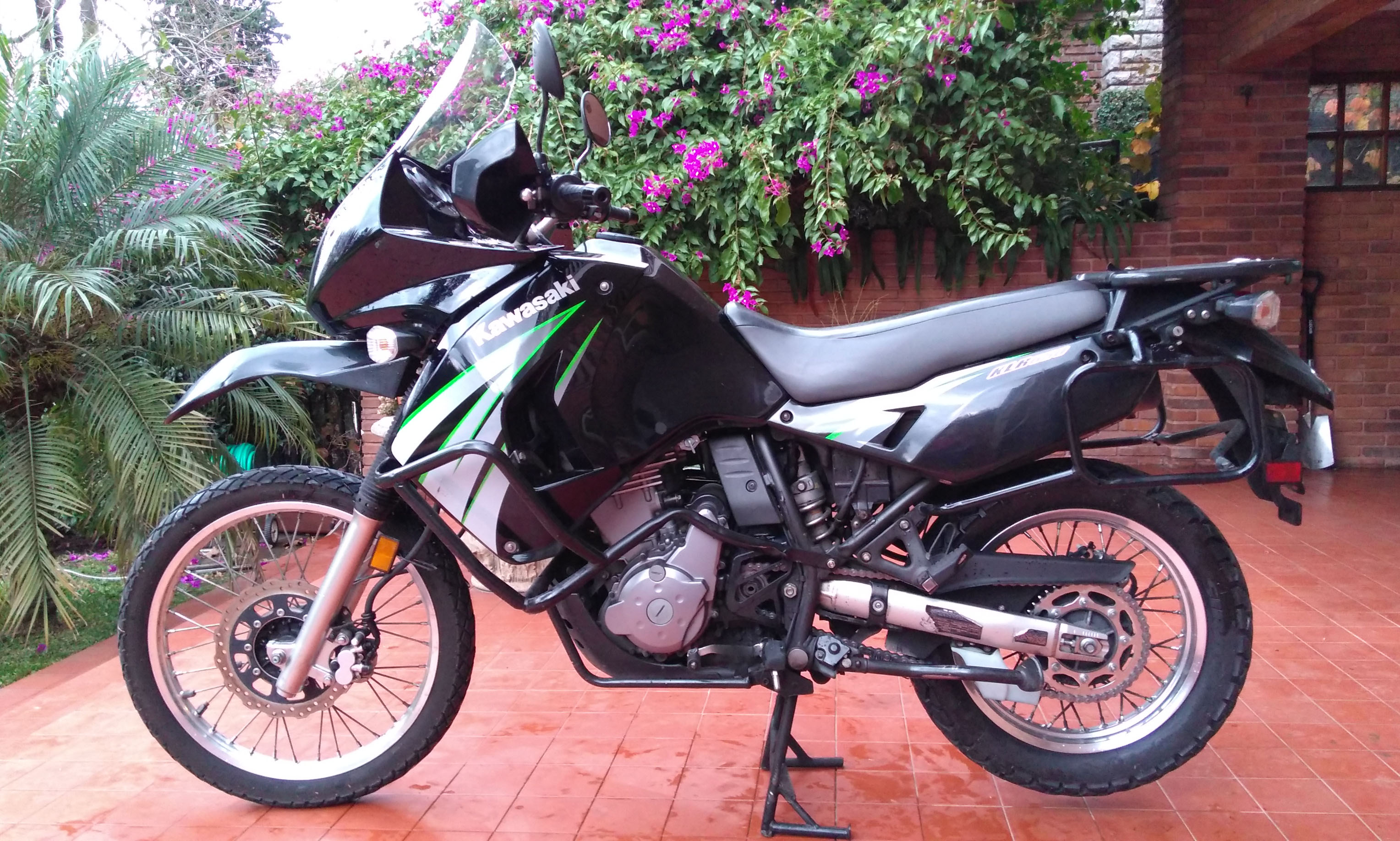
- 2009 KLR650
- Manufacturer: Kawasaki
- Production: 2008–2018
- Assembly: Rayong, Thailand (2008–2018)
- Engine: 652 cc single, liquid-cooled, 4-stroke, DOHC, 4-valves
- Bore / stroke: 100 mm × 83 mm (3.9 in × 3.3 in)
- Compression ratio: 9.5:1
- Power: 36.5 hp (27.2 kW) @ 6,100 rpm
- Torque: 35.2 lb⋅ft (47.7 N⋅m) @ 4,600 rpm
- Ignition type: Electric start
- Fuel delivery: Keihin CVK-40 constant velocity carburetor
- Transmission: wet, 5 speed
- Suspension: Front 38mm Telescoping; Rear: Uni-Trak swingarm
- Brakes: Front: disc Rear: disc
- Rake, trail: 28°, 111 mm (4.4 in)
- Wheelbase: 58.3 in (1,480 mm)
- Dimensions: L: 2,295 mm (90.4 in); W: 960 mm (38 in); H: 1,350 mm (53 in)
- Seat height: 35 in (890 mm)
- Weight: 337 lb (153 kg) (dry); 432.1 lb (196.0 kg) (wet)
- Fuel capacity: 6.1 US gal (23 L; 5.1 imp gal)
- Oil capacity: 2.6 US qt (2,500 ml)

In 2008 the KLR650 was extensively redesigned compared to the minor year over year updates seen throughout the first generation. A vast majority of the changes are comfort and quality of life improvements, rather than performance-related changes.

Changes from first generation

- New trim, fairings, and turn signals
- New instrument panel and gauge cluster
- Redesigned handlebar control switches
- Twin-piston rear brake caliper (previously single piston)
- Alternator upgraded to 17 A output, providing 36 additional watts
- Stock carburetor main jet reduced from Keihn size 148 to size 145.
- Reinforced idler-shaft lever (called the doohickey by KLR riders).
- Fork diameter increased from 38 to 41 mm (1.5 to 1.6 in)
- New rear swingarm
- Larger petal-style vented brake rotors (280mm/240mm)
- Increased radiator capacity

Other minor changes were also done, such as a dual beam headlight, larger luggage rack, firmer seat and larger-diameter wheel spokes. With the numerous changes and improvements, the second generation KLR gained 16 lb (7.3 kg) of dry weight to the bike.

Incremental changes

During production of the second generation of KLR, the following changes were made:

- 2009: New piston rings are thinner and have more tension, resulting in a significant reduction in oil consumption.
- Mid-2011: New clutch basket with only 6 clutch plates (vs 7 since 1996). The change starts at engine number KL650AEA72320.
- 2014 1/2: (Mid year) The 41mm forks were upgraded to make the springs 40% firmer and to increase the firmness of the rebound damping by 27%. The Uni-Trak rear linkage suspension were upgraded to provide a 63% increase spring rate and to increase the firmness of the rebound damping by 83%. Changes to the seat were made to make it narrower with a more tapered front. The width of the rear of the seat has been increased and has become less tapered.

== Third Generation (2022–present) ==
Kawasaki KLR650
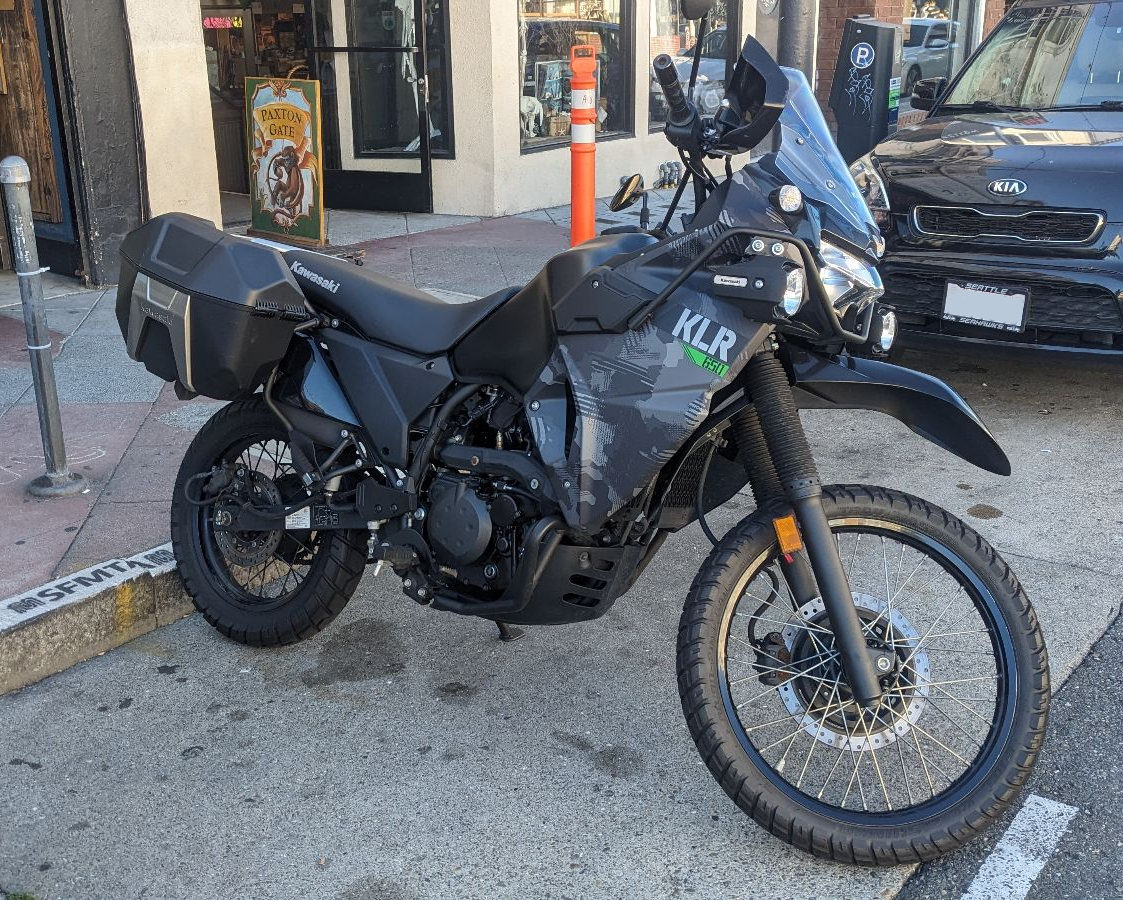
- Manufacturer: Kawasaki
- Production: 2022–present
- Assembly: Rayong, Thailand
- Engine: 652 cc single, liquid-cooled, 4-stroke, DOHC, 4-valves
- Bore / stroke: 100 mm × 83 mm (3.9 in × 3.3 in)
- Compression ratio: 9.5:1
- Power: 40 hp (30 kW) @ 6,100 rpm
- Torque: 39.1 lb⋅ft (53.0 N⋅m) @ 4,500 rpm
- Ignition type: Electric start
- Transmission: wet, 5 speed
- Suspension: Front 41mm Telescoping; Rear: Uni-Trak swingarm
- Brakes: Front: disc Rear: disc
- Rake, trail: 28°, 111 mm (4.4 in)
- Wheelbase: 60.6 in (1,540 mm)
- Dimensions: L: 2,295 mm (90.4 in); W: 960 mm (38 in); H: 1,350 mm (53 in)
- Seat height: 35 in (890 mm)
- Weight: Non-ABS: 456.2 lb (206.9 kg), ABS: 460.6 lb (208.9 kg) (wet)
- Fuel capacity: 6.1 US gal (23 L; 5.1 imp gal)
- Oil capacity: 2.6 US qt (2,500 ml)

After 3 years of being out of production, the third generation of the KLR 650 was redesigned and unveiled on January 26, 2021. The KLR650 was released at a price of ฿268,500 (US$8,395.87) in Thailand.

Changes from second generation

- Carburetor replaced for electronic fuel injector system
- ABS added (optional)
- New bodywork, trim, and fairings
- Adjustable windshield
- LCD gauge cluster
- Larger front disk brake
- Alternator upgraded to 26 A output

Other minor changes include new exhaust pipe diameter, revised cam profiles, and a new catalyzer. The third generation KLR gained 24 lb (11 kg) of dry weight to the bike.

Variants

KLR650-S: Introduced in 2023, this variation offers shorter foot pegs, higher hand grips, and a slightly slimmer seat.
