= Types of motorcycles =

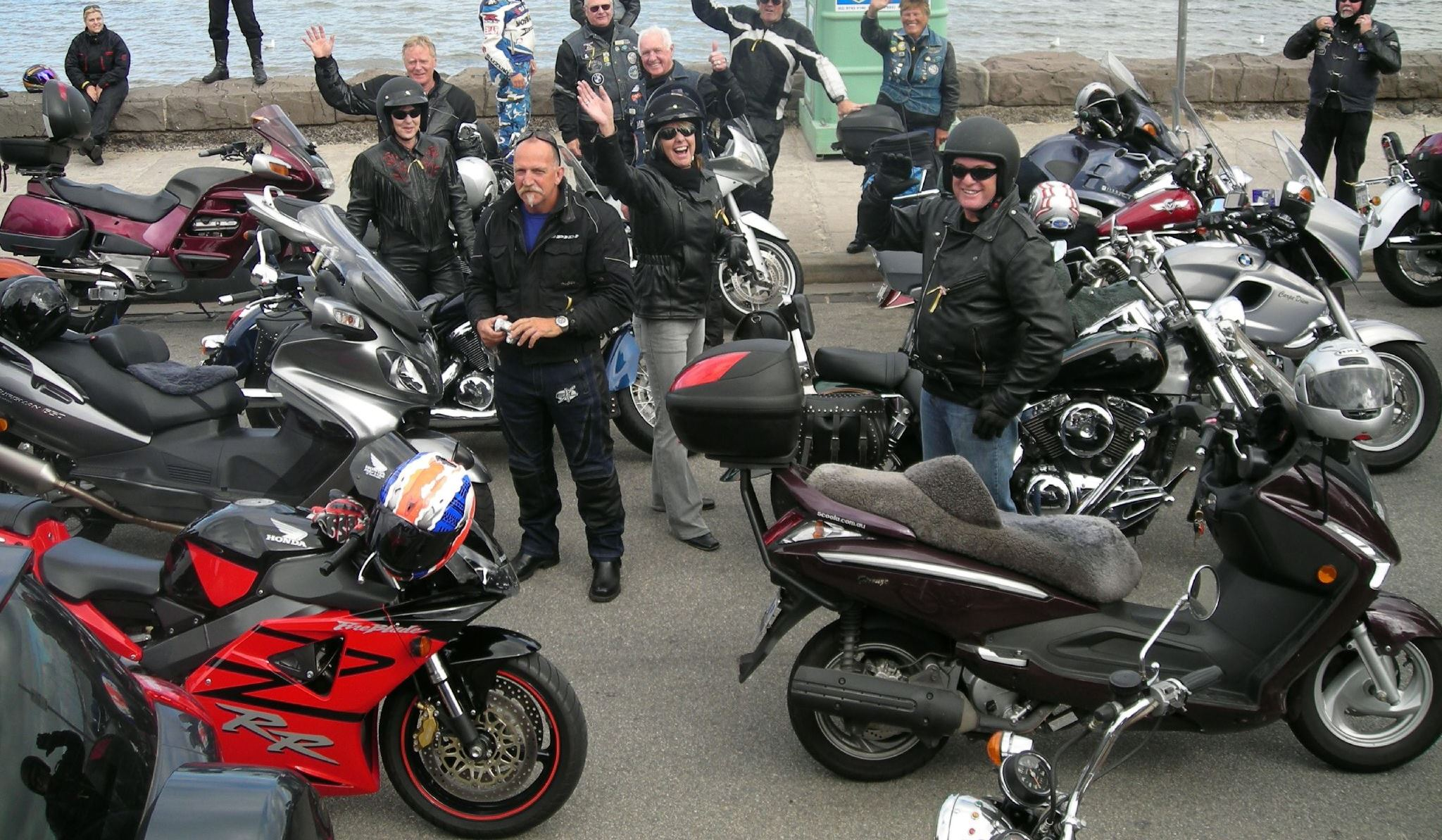
A group of sport bikes, cruisers, scooters, and touring bikes

In the market, there is a wide variety of types of motorcycles, each with unique characteristics and features. Models vary according to the specific needs of each user, such as standard, cruiser, touring, sports, off-road, dual-purpose, scooters, ' 'speedway' ', etc. Often, some hybrid types like sport touring are considered as an additional category.

There is no universal system for classifying all types of motorcycles. However, some authors argue that there are generally six categories recognized by most motorcycle manufacturers and organizations, making clear distinctions between these six main types and other motorcycles. For example, scooters, mopeds, underbones, minibikes, pocket bikes, electric bikes such as Surrons or Talaria or even Stark Vargs, and three-wheeled motorcycles are often excluded from the main categories within these classifications, but other classification schemes may also include these types of motorcycles.

Nevertheless, there are strict classification systems enforced by competitive motorcycle sport sanctioning bodies, or legal definitions of a motorcycle established by certain legal jurisdictions for motorcycle registration, emissions, road traffic safety rules or motorcyclist licensing. There are also informal classifications or nicknames used by manufacturers, riders, and the motorcycling media. Some experts do not recognize sub-types, like naked bike, that "purport to be classified" outside the usual classes, because they fit within one of the main types and are recognizable only by cosmetic changes.

Street motorcycles are motorcycles designed for being ridden on paved roads. They have smooth tires with tread patterns and engines generally in the 125 cc (7.6 cu in) and over range. Typically, street motorcycles are capable of speeds up to 100 mph (160 km/h), and many of speeds in excess of 125 mph (201 km/h). Street motorcycles powered by electric motors are becoming more common, with firms like Harley-Davidson entering the market.

== Standard ==
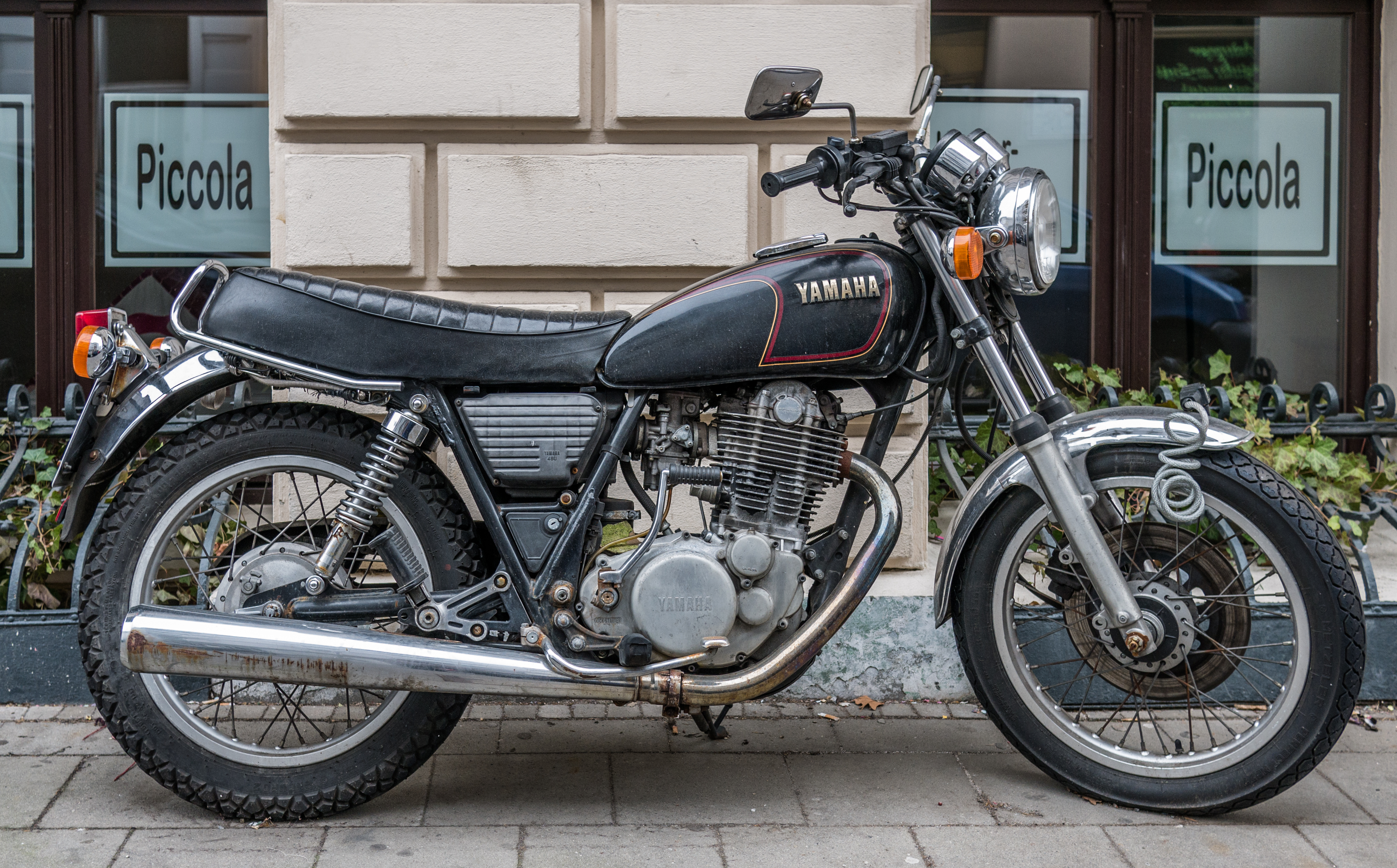
Yamaha standard motorcycle

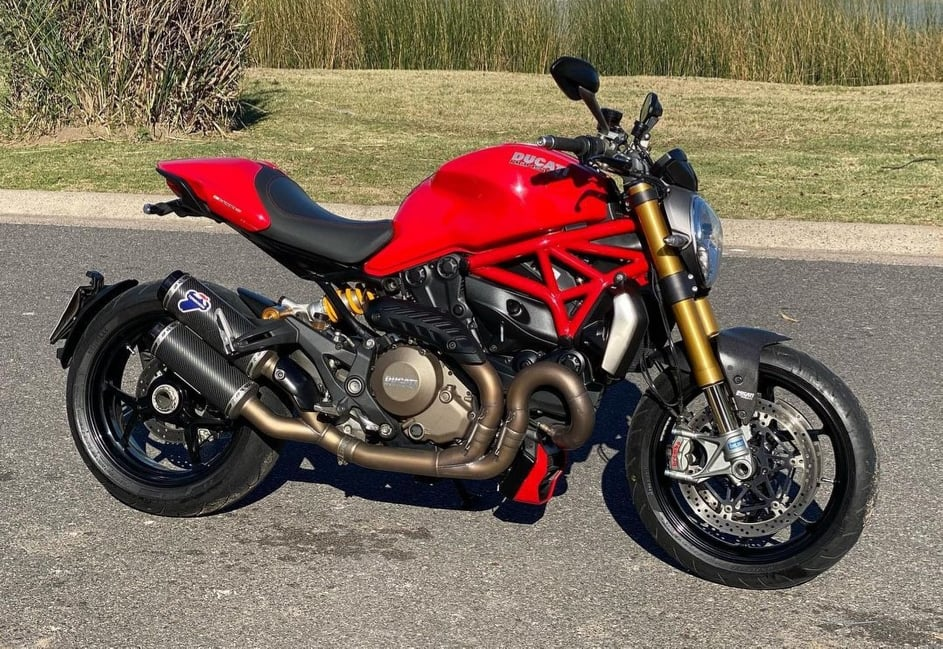
Ducati Monster 1200S naked bike

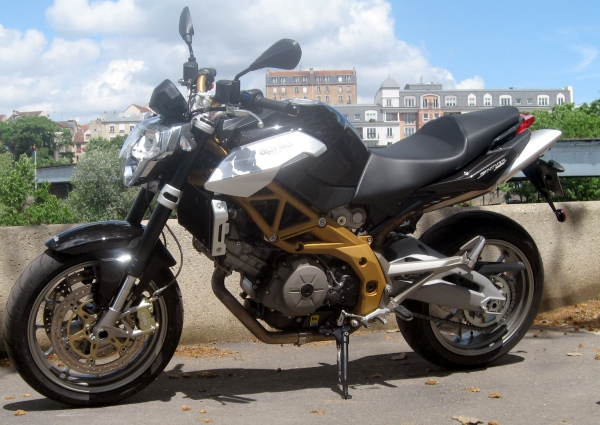
Aprilia naked bike

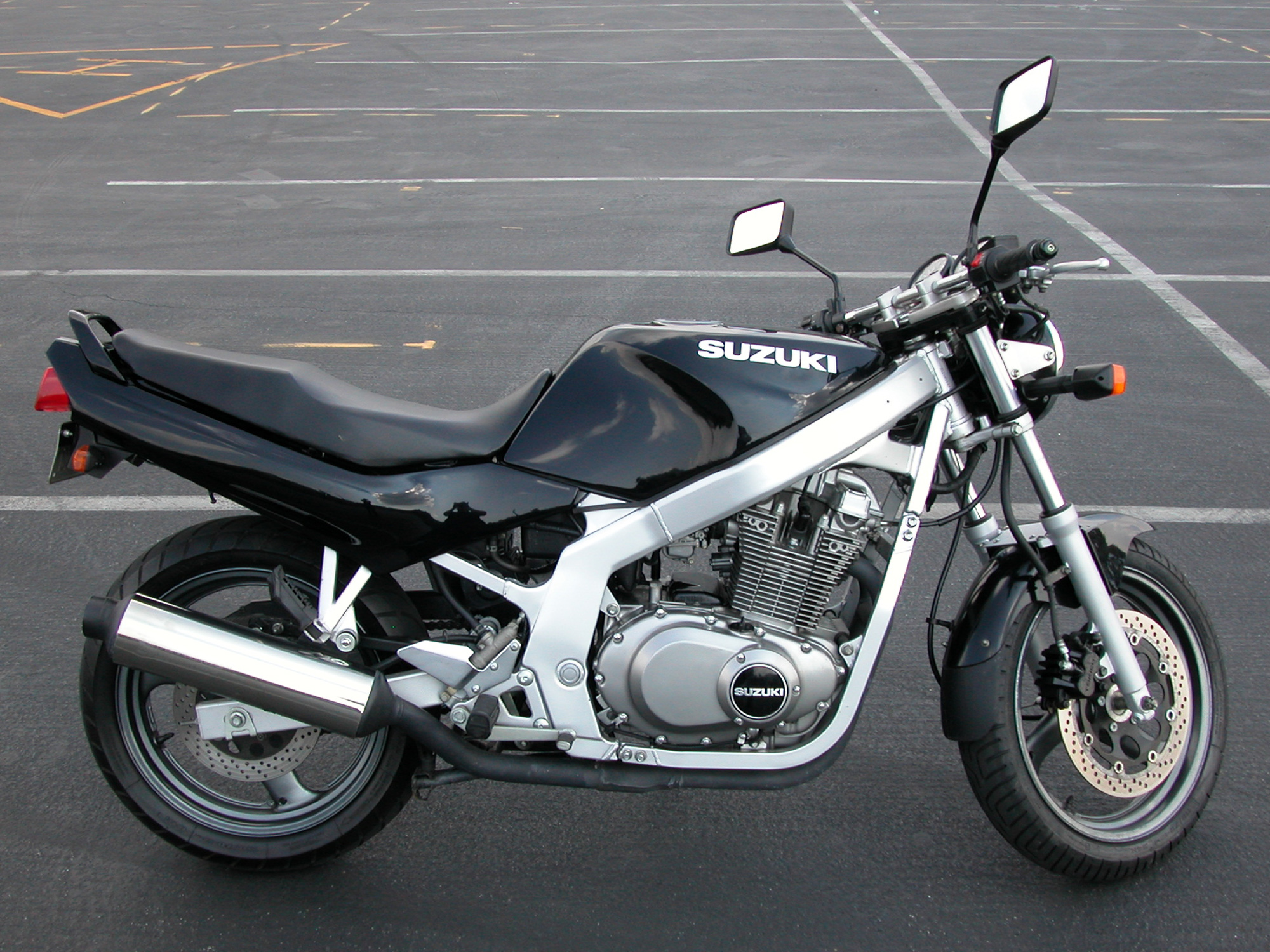
A modern Suzuki standard motorcycle

Standard motorcycles (also called naked bikes, or roadsters) are street motorcycles that conform to a stereotypical image of a motorcycle, with an exposed engine and fuel tank above it; fairings and windscreens are not available from the manufacturer (hence the modern usage naked bikes). With handlebars that are set neither high nor low, and footpegs neither placed forward nor "rear-set", standards give an upright rider posture between the semi-recumbent cruiser and the forward crouch of a sport bike. A standard's relationship between footpegs, handlebars and seat gives the rider a comfortable and natural posture.

Beginning motorcyclists learn to ride on standard bikes due to their comfort, ease of control, and safety, and many experienced riders choose to continue riding standards.

== Cruiser ==
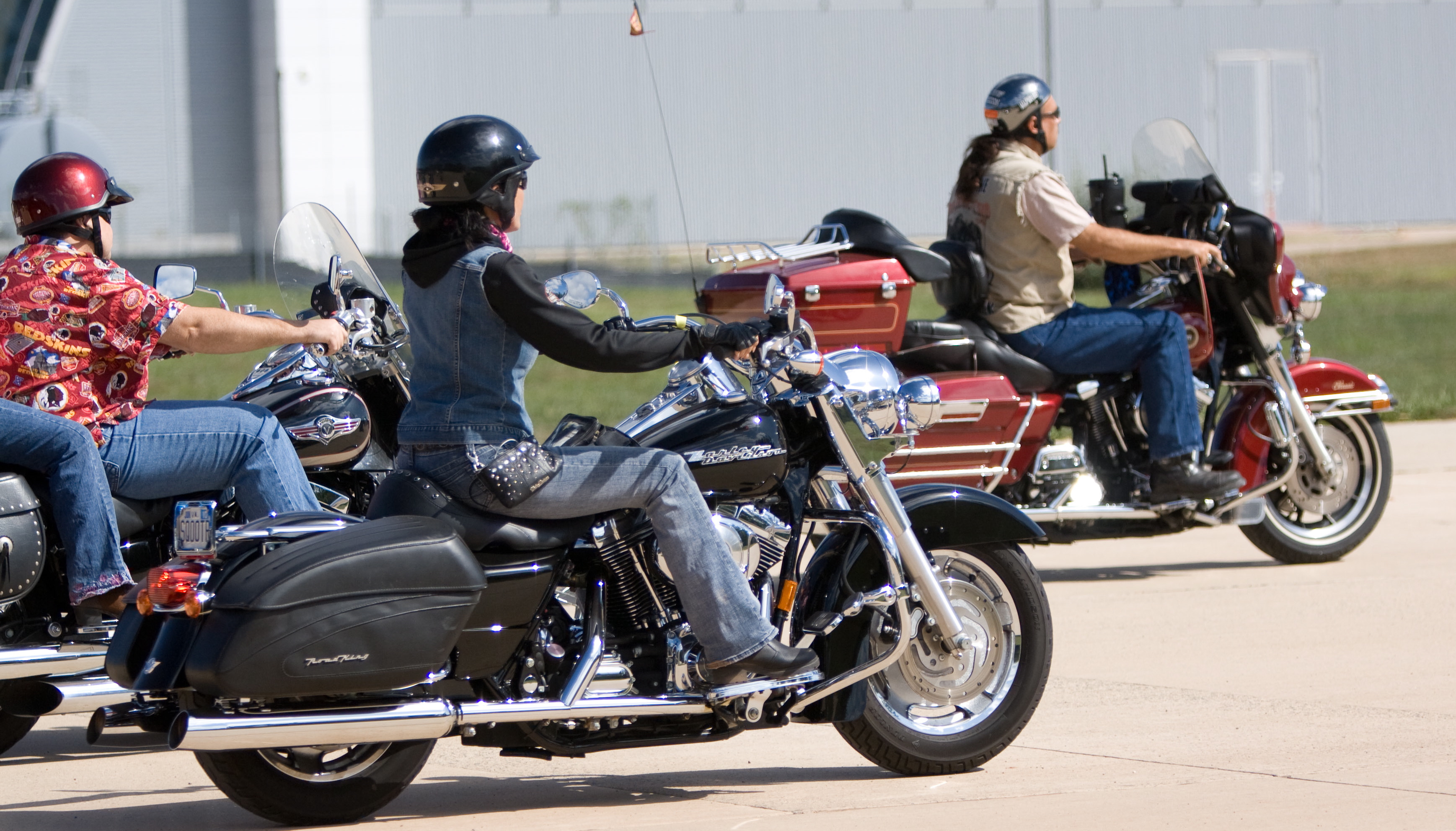
Harley-Davidson cruisers

Cruiser motorcycles (or simply cruisers) are styled after American motorcycles from the 1930s to the early 1960s, such as those made by Harley-Davidson, Indian, and Excelsior-Henderson. Harley-Davidsons largely define the cruiser category, and large-displacement V-twin engines are the norm, although other engine configurations and small to medium displacements also exist. Their engines are tuned for low-end torque, making them less demanding to ride because it is not necessary to shift as frequently to accelerate or maintain control.

The riding position places the feet forward and the hands are up relatively high, so that the spine is erect or leaning back slightly. At low to moderate speeds, cruisers are more comfortable than other styles, but riding for long periods at freeway speeds can lead to fatigue from pulling back on the handlebars to resist the force of the wind against the rider's chest. Cruisers have limited cornering ability due to a lack of ground clearance.

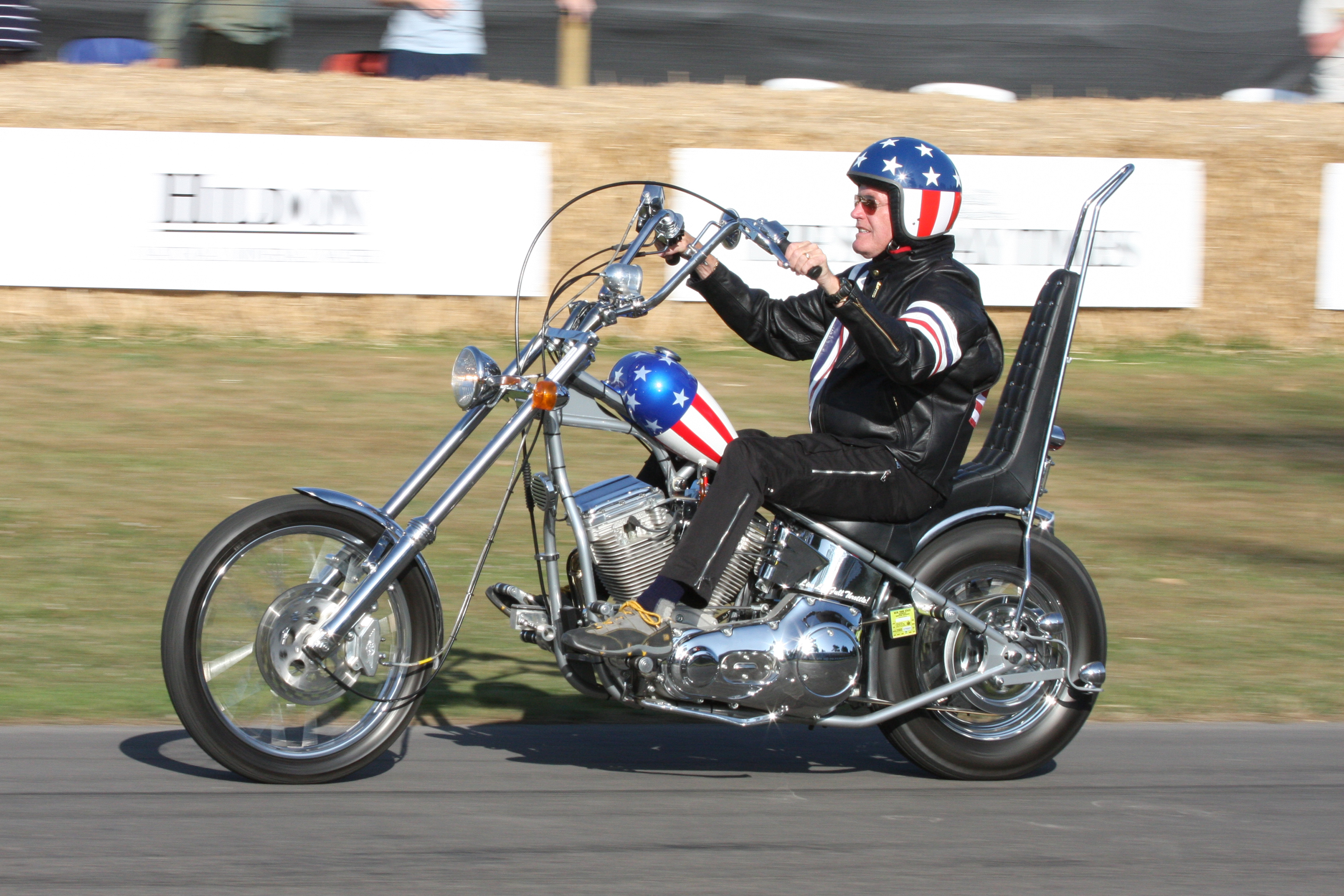
Actor Peter Fonda aboard an Easy Rider chopper

Choppers are a type of cruiser, so called because they are a "chopped", or cut-down, version of a production cruiser. Choppers are usually custom projects that result in a bike modified to suit the owner's ideals, and, as such, are a source of pride and accomplishment. Stereotypically, a chopper may have raked-out forks, small fuel tanks and high handlebars. Choppers were popularised in the Peter Fonda film Easy Rider. Being designed primarily for visual effect, choppers will rarely be suitable for lengthy cruising.

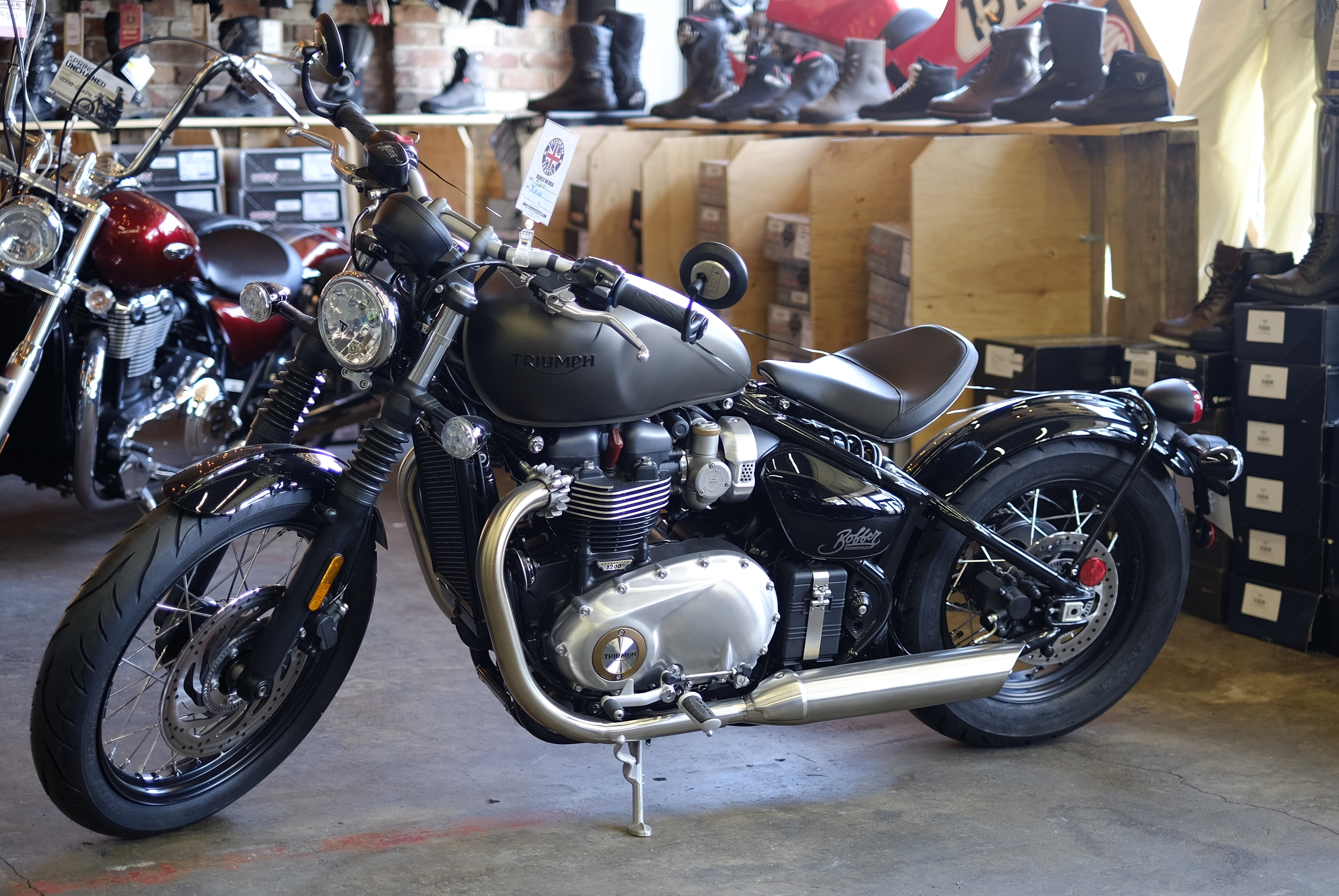
Triumph Bobber 2017

Related to the chopper motorcycle is the bobber, a solo bike which is created by "bobbing" a factory bike by removing superfluous weight and bodywork from a motorcycle to reduce mass and increase performance. A common element of these motorcycles is a shortened rear fender that creates a "bobbed" look.

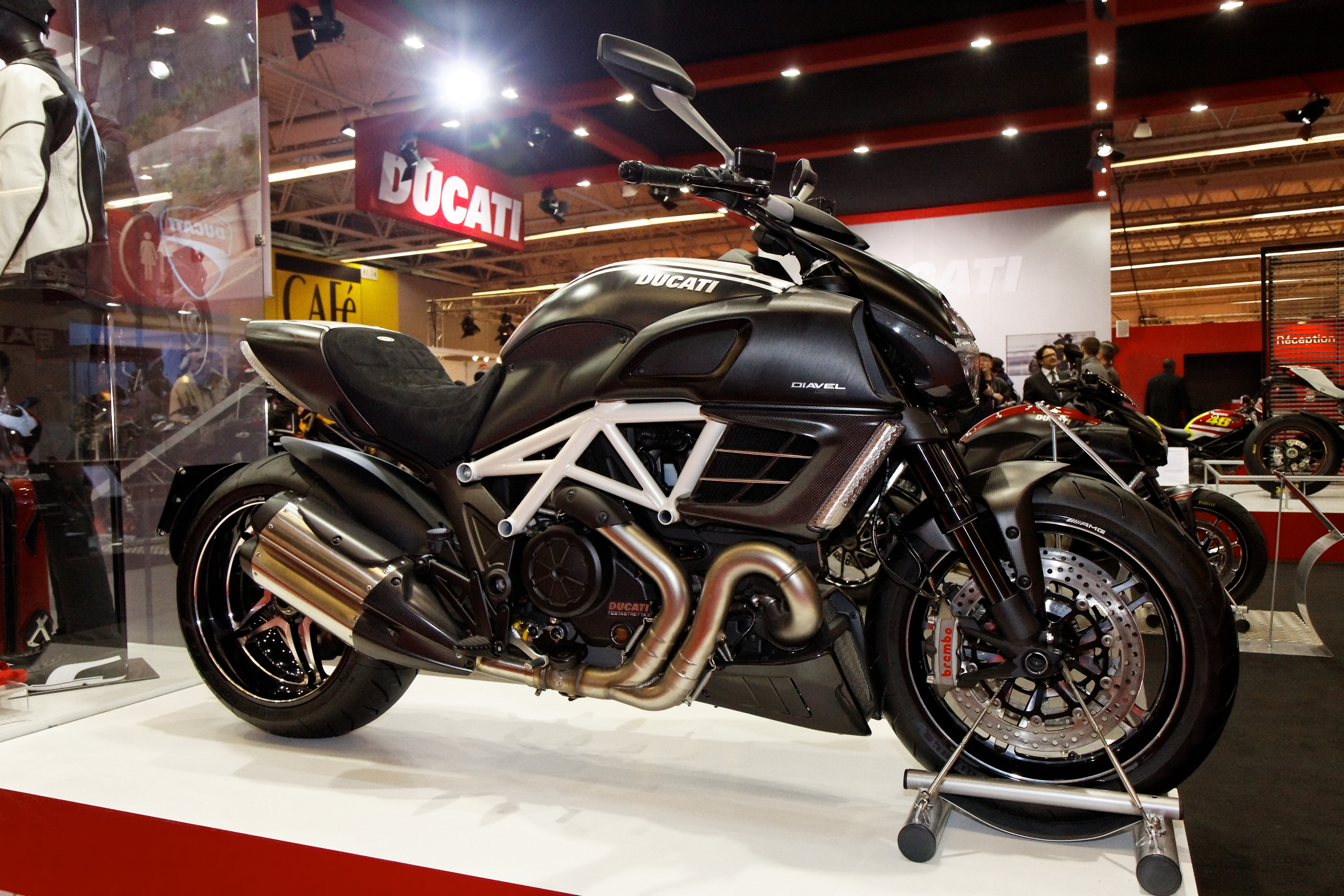
Ducati Diavel power cruiser

Power cruiser is a name used to distinguish bikes in the cruiser class that have significantly greater levels of power. They typically have with upgraded brakes and suspensions, better ground clearance, and premium surface finishes, as well as more exotic or non-traditional styling.

== Touring ==
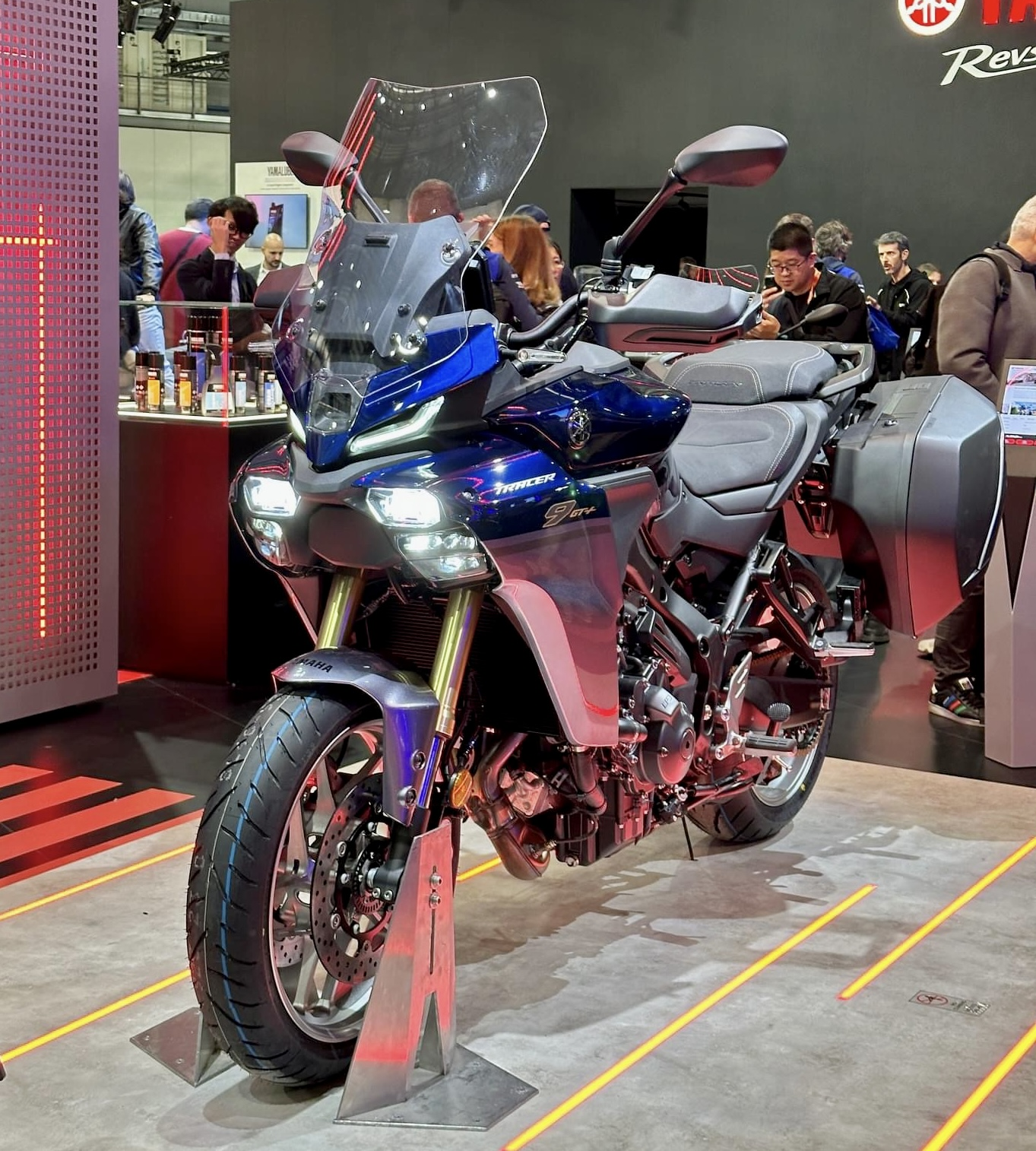
Yamaha Tracer 900, a touring bike

Although any motorcycle can be equipped and used for touring, touring motorcycles are specifically designed to excel at covering long distances. They have large-displacement engines, fairings and screens that offer good weather and wind protection, large-capacity fuel tanks for long ranges between fill-ups, and a relaxed, upright seating position. Passenger accommodation is excellent and expansive luggage space is the norm for this class. Such bikes can have wet weights of 850–900 lb (390–410 kg) and top 1,300–1,400 lb (590–640 kg) fully loaded with a rider, passenger and gear.

Bagger, full dresser, full dress tourer, or dresser are various names for touring motorcycles, sometimes used disparagingly or jocularly, and originally referring to a Harley-Davidson or other cruisers with full sets of saddlebags. This can now refer to any touring motorcycle.

== Sport ==
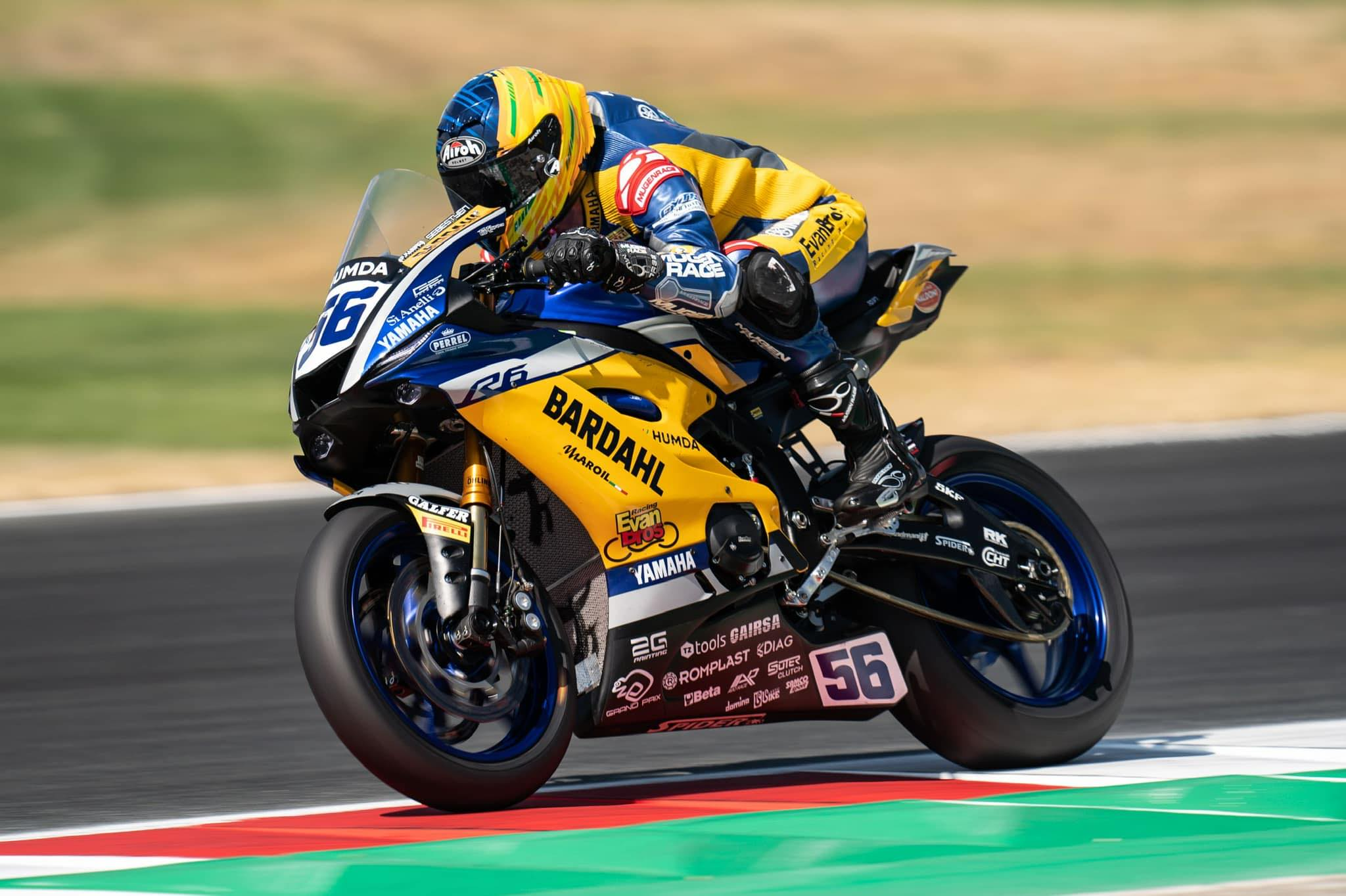
A Yamaha YZF-R6 sport bike

Sport bikes are road bikes that emphasize top speed, acceleration, braking, handling and grip, typically at the expense of comfort and fuel economy in comparison to other motorcycle types. Sport bikes have comparatively high performance engines supported within a lightweight frame. Inline-four engines dominate the sport bike category, with V-twins and parallel twins having a significant presence; and most other engine configurations appear in small numbers at times. High-performance braking systems may use upgraded brake pads, multi-piston calipers and larger vented rotors. Sports bike suspension systems may be more sophisticated, with greater adjustments for compression and rebound. Sport bikes have fairings to completely enclose the engine, along with windscreens that effectively deflect the air at high speeds away from the rider, thereby minimising overall drag.

Sport bikes may have footpegs that are both higher and set further back than on a standard bike, improving ground clearance when cornering and enabling a more prone position for the rider. There may be a long reach to the hand controls, which positions the body and center of gravity forward, above the fuel tank. The rider leans forward into the wind, the force of which may support the rider's weight at high speeds. However, at lower speeds a rider may experience excessive weight on the arms and wrists, causing fatigue.

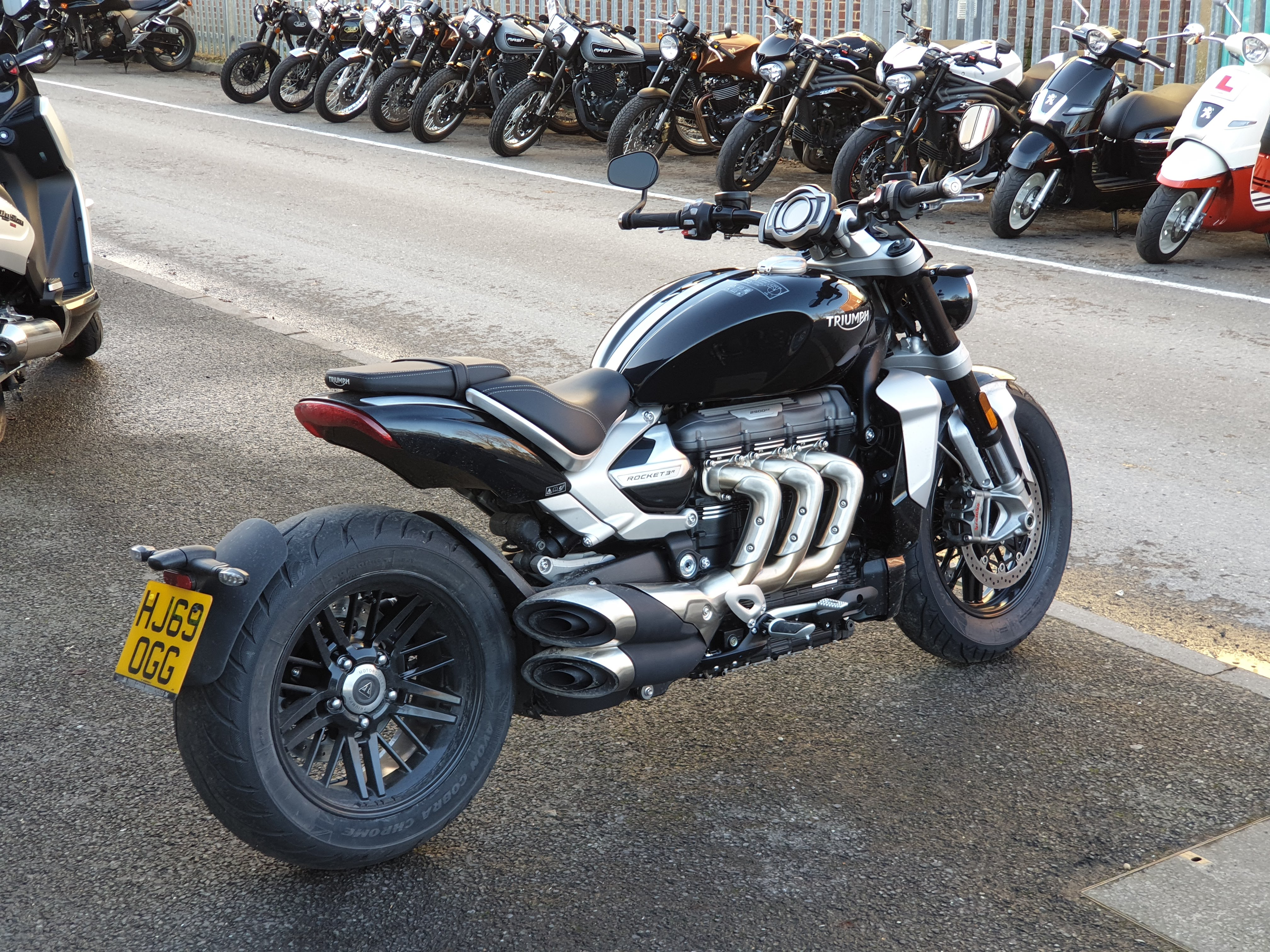
A Triumph Rocket 3 with 2,458 cc engine.

Muscle bike is a nickname for a motorcycle type, derived from a sport bike design, that puts a disproportionately high priority on engine power.

Streetfighters are derived from sport bikes, originally being customized sport bikes with the fairings removed and higher handlebars replacing the low clip-on handlebars. Since the 1990s, factory streetfighters have been produced. As with naked bike and muscle bike (below), the name streetfighter is used to help clarify the middle ground occupied by designs that blend elements of both sport bikes and standards. Café racer originated among British motorcycle enthusiasts of the early 1960s in London. Café racers were initially just standard production bikes that were later modified by their owners and optimized for speed and handling for quick rides over drag racing strip or short distances.

== Off-road ==
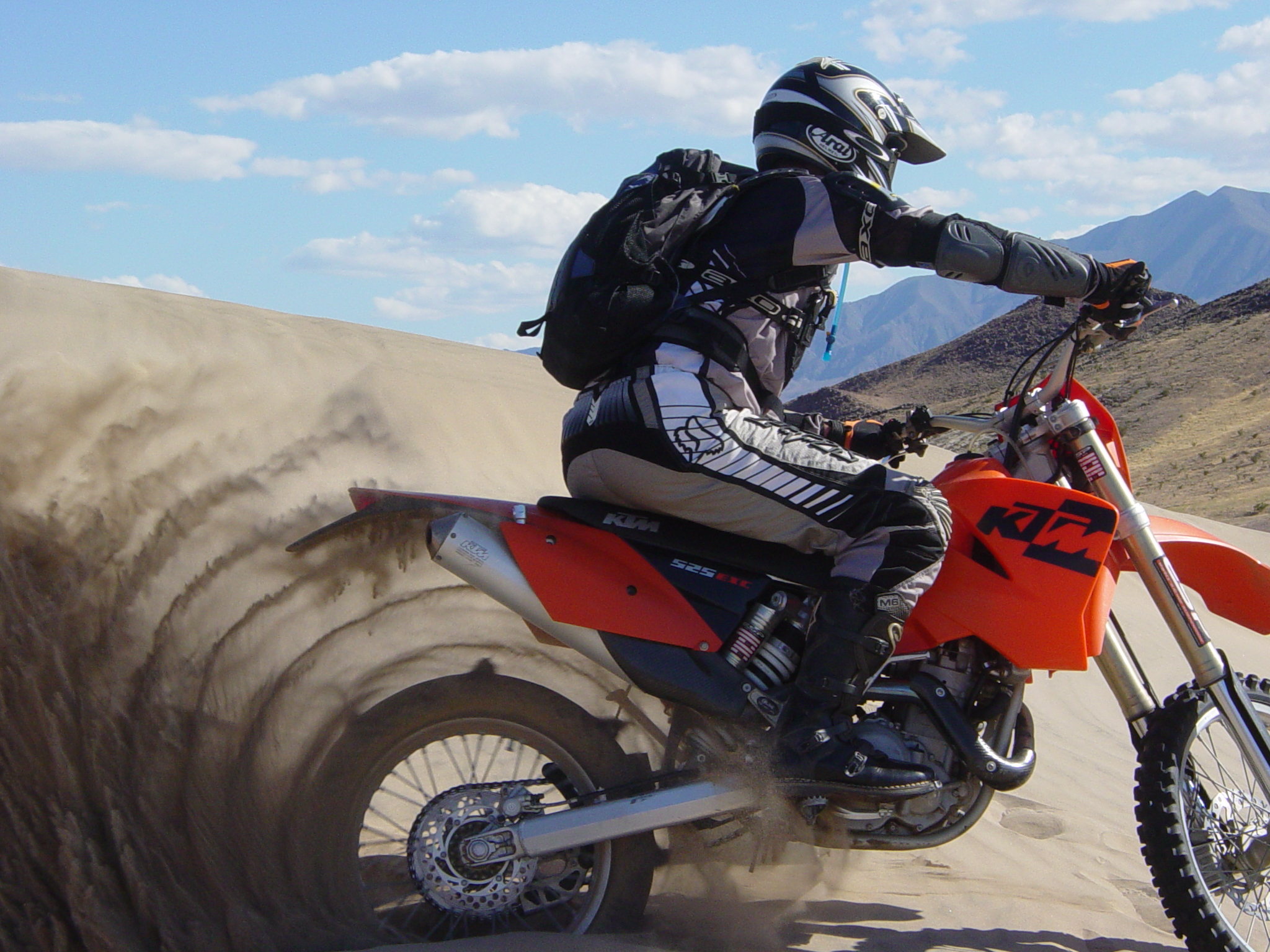
A KTM dirt bike with a paddle tire

Off-road motorcycles, also known as dirt bikes, trailbikes or scramblers, are specially designed for off-road use. The term off-road refers to driving surfaces that are not conventionally paved. These are rough surfaces, often created naturally, such as sand, gravel, river beds and crossings, mud or snow. These types of terrain can best be traversed with bikes that are designed to better handle off-road conditions. Compared to road-going motorcycles, off-road machines are lighter and more flexible, typically have long travel suspension, high ground clearance, and are geared lower to provide more torque in off-road situations. Wheels may have knobby or hybrid dual-purpose tires, often clamped to the rim with a rim lock. Many competitive events exist and have prompted the development of varied off-road motorcycle sports, for which a number of specialized motorcycles have been built:

- Motocross — Such bikes are raced on short, closed off-road tracks with a variety of obstacles. The motorcycles have a small fuel tank for lightness and compactness. Long-travel suspension allows riders to take jumps at high speed. Motocross engines are single-cylinder two-stroke or four-stroke units, which vary in size from 50cc up to about 500cc. At the professional level, bikes are split up into two levels based on their displacements: MX and MX Lite. The MX Lite class contains 125cc two-stroke engines and 250cc four-stroke engines, while the MX class pits 250cc two-stroke engines against 450cc four-stroke engines. The actual displacement for both four-strokes and two-strokes can be under what is listed for the different bikes. The differences in power, displacement, torque, and weight are all variables that balance the competition between two-stroke and four-stroke engines. Motocross sidecar outfits have bigger engines, usually four-stroke and often twin-cylinder. Motocross bikes are also used in freestyle motocross.
- Enduro — A modified off-road bike which is something between a dual-sport motorcycle and motocrosser, with some having the addition of a horn, lights, effective silencing and a number plate. Enduro riders compete over a longer course (which may include roads); and an enduro event may last between one day and six days (such as the International Six Days Enduro). Some enduro events (known as "multi-lappers") are held on rather shorter circuits somewhat like extended motocross tracks. "Multi-lappers" are especially popular with novice riders.
  - Hard enduro — Enduro bike with more focus on durability, maneuverability, agility and low-end torque.
  - Rally raid, or "rallies" — A special type of enduro bike with a significantly larger fuel tank for very long distance racing, typically through deserts (e.g. Paris-Dakar rally). Engine capacities tend to be larger, usually between 450 cc and 750 cc.
- Dual-sport — A dual-sport bike is a multi-purpose bike, made for on-road and recreational off-road riding. A dual-sport bike may resemble an enduro bike, but since a dual-sport bike is not intended to be used for competition, it may be less rugged, and equipped with dual-purpose tires and with more road legal equipment, such as indicators, mirrors and extra instruments. Dual-sport bikes require a number plate to be ridden on most state and county roads.

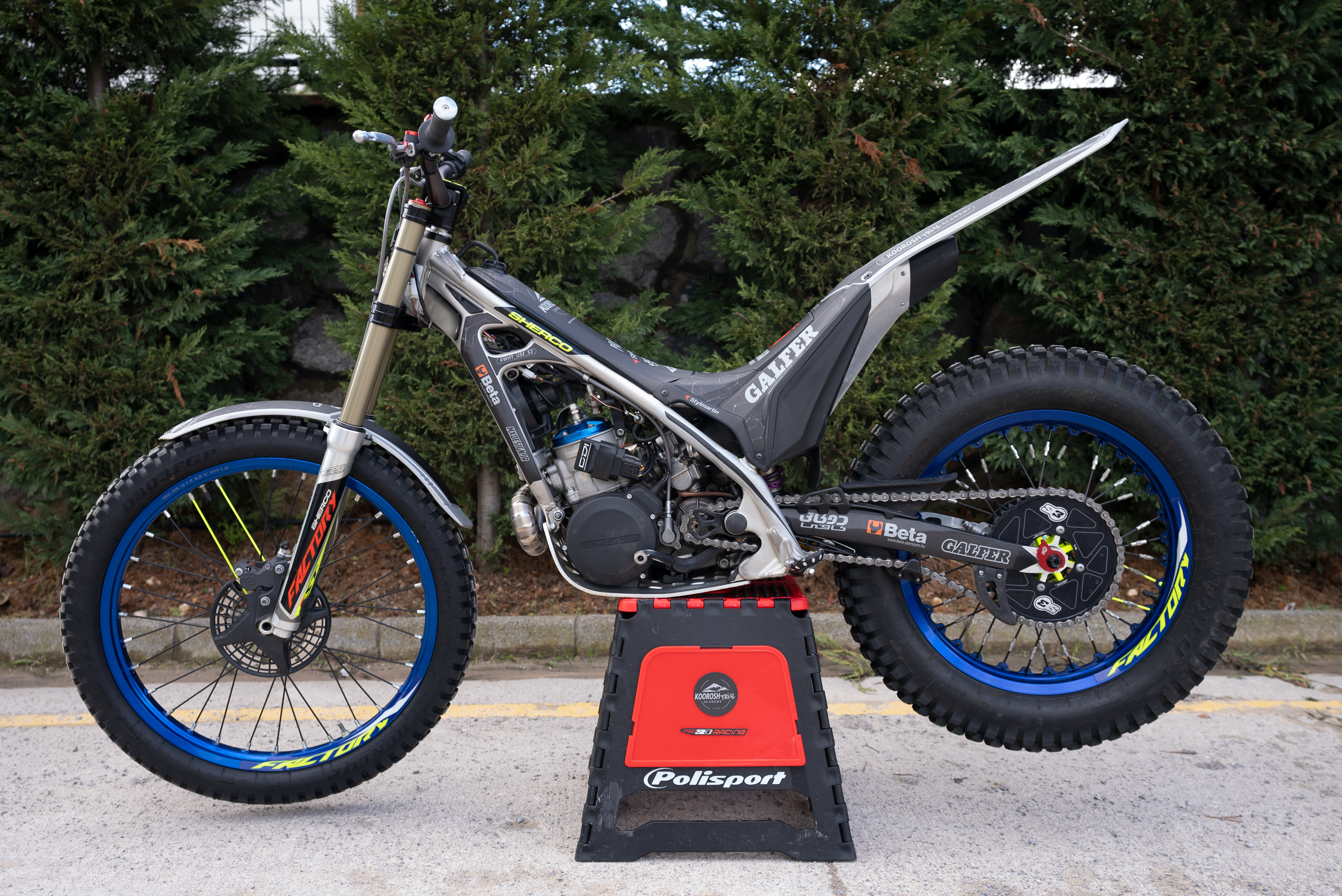
Trial motorcycle

- Trials — A specialized form of off-road competition testing balancing skills and precision rather than speed. For a trials bike, low weight and crisp throttle response power are prioritized, so trials bikes tend to have a small (125 cc to 300 cc) engine, with two-strokes being common. During the trial, the rider stands on the foot-pegs, so a trials bike will have only a vestigial seat, or no seat at all. Fuel tanks are very small, giving a very limited range. Trials bikes are designed to tackle obstacles which would be impossible for other kinds of motorcycle.
- Hillclimbing — Longer wheelbase to prevent backflip, and paddle or spiked tyres. Unlike the small screws/studs found on snow tyres, each spike is 4cm long and 1cm thick, bolted on with two washers on interior and exterior of tyre. 1, 2 or 3 in a row, spaced equidistantly around the circumference of a tyre.

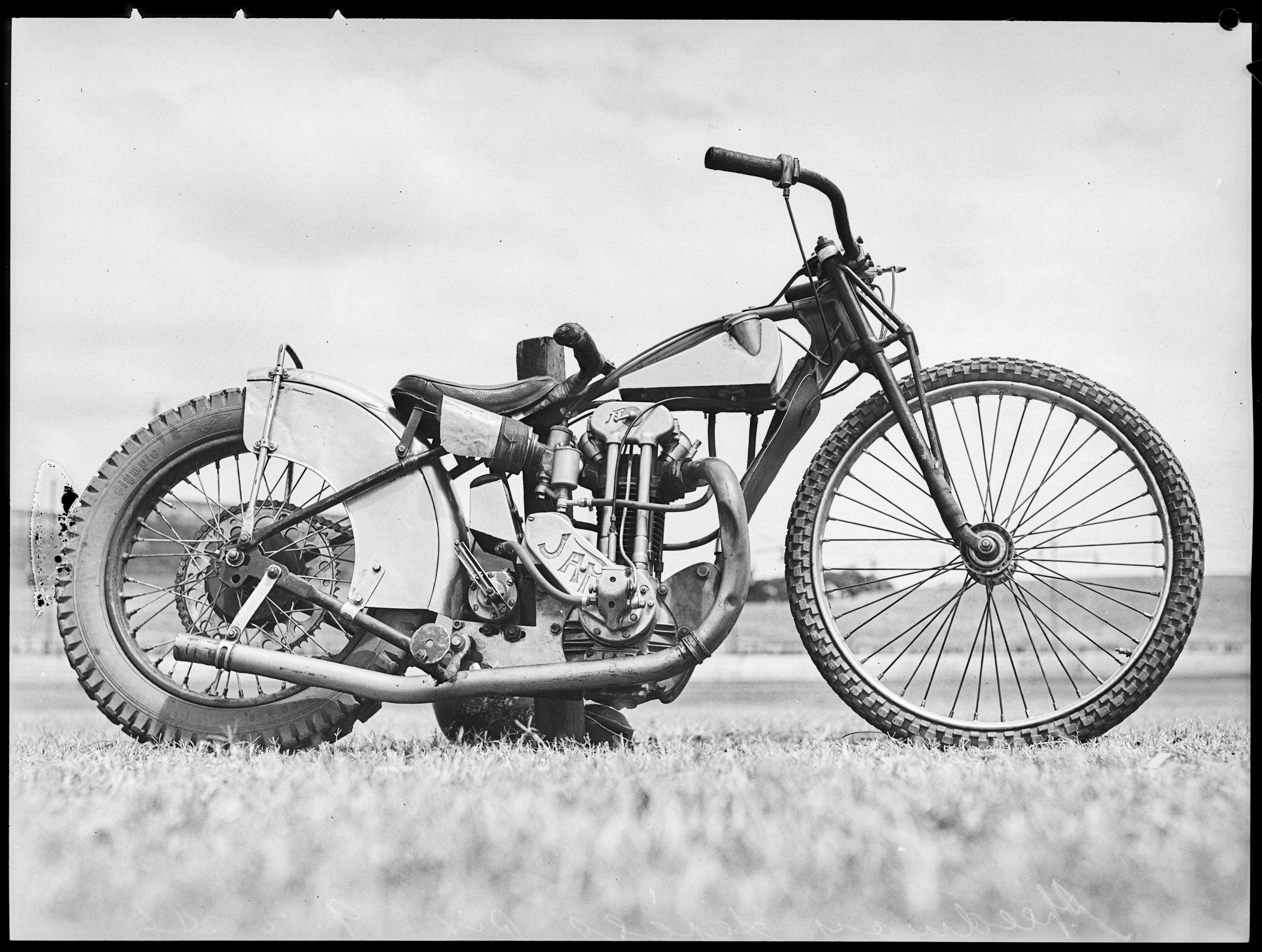
Speedway track bike

- Track racing — High-speed oval racing, typically with no brakes, nor rear suspension. The engines, fueled by methanol, are long-stroke four-stroke singles, such as JAP and Jawa. They have at most two gears. Some types, such as speedway, and grass-track bikes, are designed to take left turns only.
- Snow bikes — A snow bike takes a typical dirt-bike and replaces the rear wheel with a single tread system similar to a snowmobile and the front wheel with a large ski. They are much smaller and more nimble than a snowmobile, and they have a tighter turning radius, which lets the rider go where many snowmobiles cannot. The first prototype of motorcycles with a rear tread date all the way back to the 1920s, with failed attempts to bring them onto the market until recent times. Many motorcycles made after the 1990s or later can be fitted with a kit that transforms them into a snow bike.

== Dual-purpose ==
Dual-purpose motorcycles, sometimes called dual-sports, adventure (ADVs), scramblers or on/off-road motorcycles, are street legal machines that are also designed to enter off-road situations.

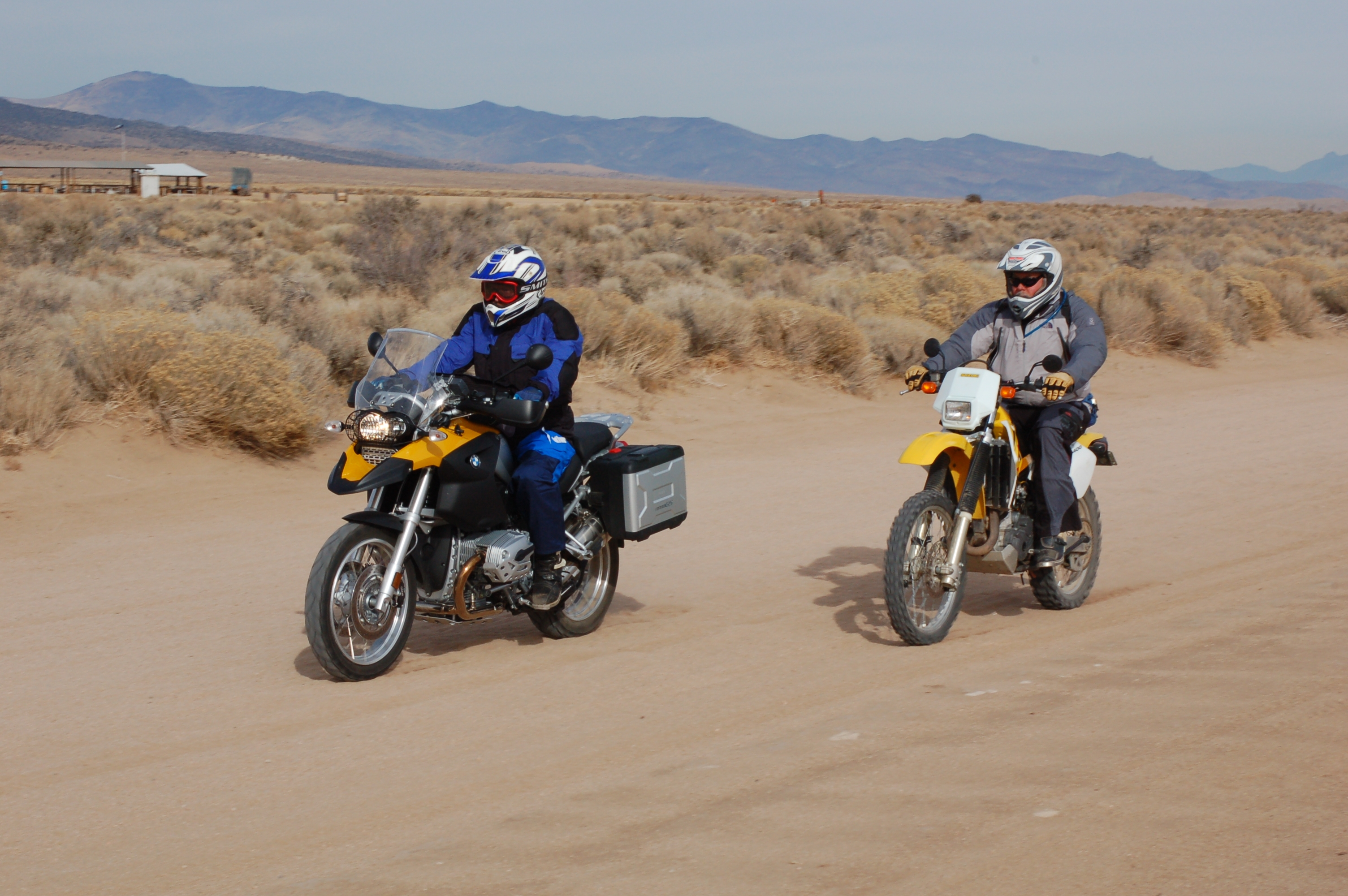
A BMW R1200GS (left) and Suzuki DR-Z400 (right), examples of adventure and dual-sport bikes.

Dual-sport, typically based on a dirt bike chassis, they have added lights, mirrors, signals, and instruments that allow them to be licensed for public roads. They are higher than other street bikes, with a high center of gravity and tall seat height, allowing good suspension travel for rough ground.

Adventure motorcycles (ADV) are motorcycles with touring capability on paved and unpaved roads. As a dual-purpose bike they have a significant on-pavement bias and perform well on pavement at higher speeds unlike most dual-sports. Their size, weight and sometimes their tires may limit their off-road capability. Most adventure motorcycles function well on graded dirt and gravel roads but are less than ideal on more difficult off-pavement terrain.

Supermoto (also known as a supermotard or motard) are designed to compete on a single course that alternated between three genres of motorcycle racing: road racing, track racing, and motocross. This increasingly popular type of motorcycle is often a dual-sport that has been fitted by the manufacturer with smaller rims and road tires. Supermotos are quickly gaining popularity as street bikes due to their combination of light weight, durability, relatively low cost, and sporty handling.

== Sport touring ==
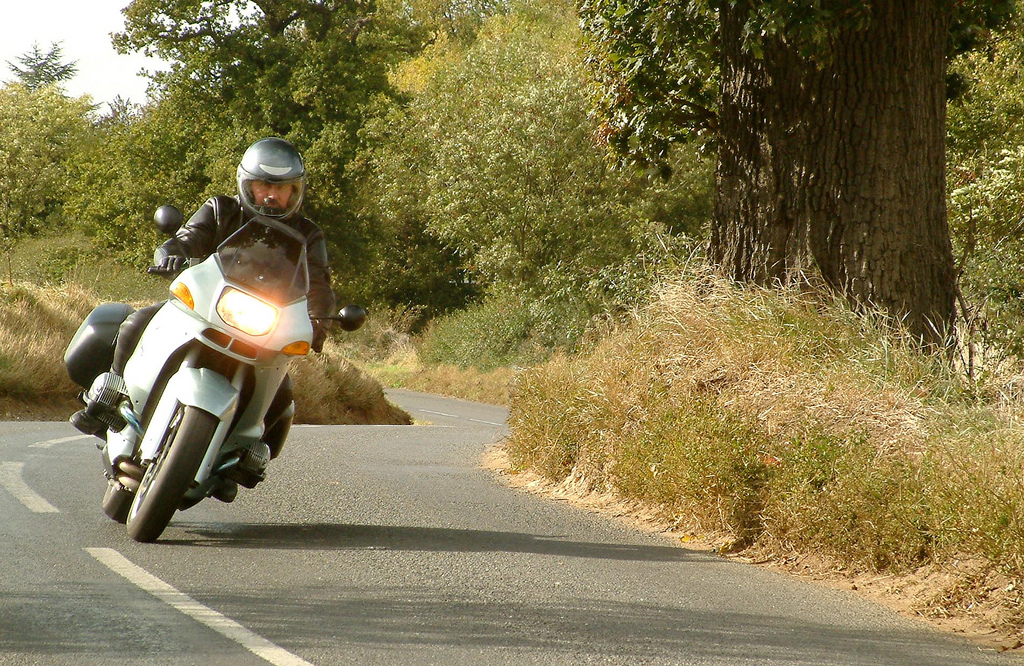
A BMW R1100RS sport-touring motorcycle

Sport touring motorcycles combine attributes of sport bikes and touring motorcycles. The rider posture is less extreme than a sport bike, giving greater long-distance comfort. Accommodation for a passenger is superior to a sport bike as well, along with increased luggage capacity. Being lighter, at 550–720 lb (250–330 kg) wet, than a pure touring bike and often having racier engines, suspensions, and brakes, sport tourers corner better and are more at home being aggressively ridden on curvy canyon roads. The distinction between touring and sport touring is not always clear as some manufacturers will list the same bike in either category in different markets. The Honda ST1300 Pan-European, for example, was listed by Honda as a sport touring motorcycle in the United States and Australia, but as a touring motorcycle in Europe.

== Scooters ==
Scooters are a type of motorcycle distinguished by their continuously variable automatic transmission (CVT) and distinctive design. Unlike traditional motorcycles, scooters feature an open frame structure, a seat, and a flat foot platform, allowing the rider to maintain an upright posture without straddling the engine. This configuration not only enhances rider comfort but also contributes to fuel efficiency. (Note: Motor scooters are sometimes classified as a vehicle independent of motorcycles, given their large number of differences and their different evolution.) Currently, three main types of scooters are recognized, each with its own characteristics and applications:

Standard scooter: This type of scooter is ideal for urban mobility due to its ease of handling and parking. They are lightweight, comfortable, and agile vehicles, perfect for navigating through dense city traffic. Their wheels are usually smaller than those of conventional motorcycles, with diameters ranging from 12 to 15 inches (30.5−38 cm), and they have an engine displacement ranging from 50cc to 150cc (3.1−9.2 cu in).

Maxi-scooter: Maxi-scooters are equipped with high-displacement engines, ranging from 200cc to 250cc (12.2–15.3 cu in), designed for covering long distances at high speeds. Although they are heavier and less agile than standard scooters, they are commonly used in cities and suburbs due to their larger fuel tank capacity and larger wheels, which can reach 15 or even 16 inches (38.1−40.7 cm).

Mega-scooter: also known as touring scooters, like maxi-scooters, mega-scooters feature a higher-displacement engine, ranging from 400cc to 850cc (24.5−51.9 cu in), and superior performance, designed for covering long distances at high speeds. However, their considerably greater weight and lower agility make them less suitable for use in the city than on highways. A scooter is considered to fall into the mega-scooter category when its displacement exceeds 400cc.

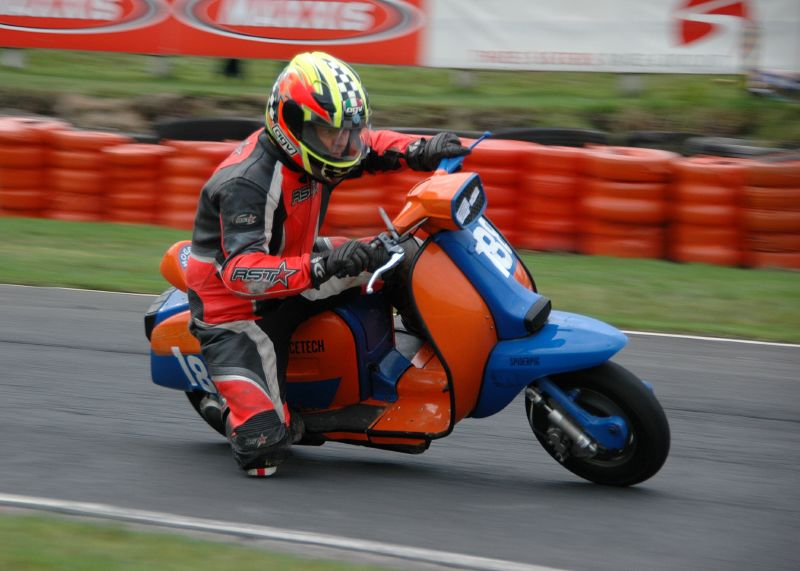
Road racing a Lambretta standard scooter

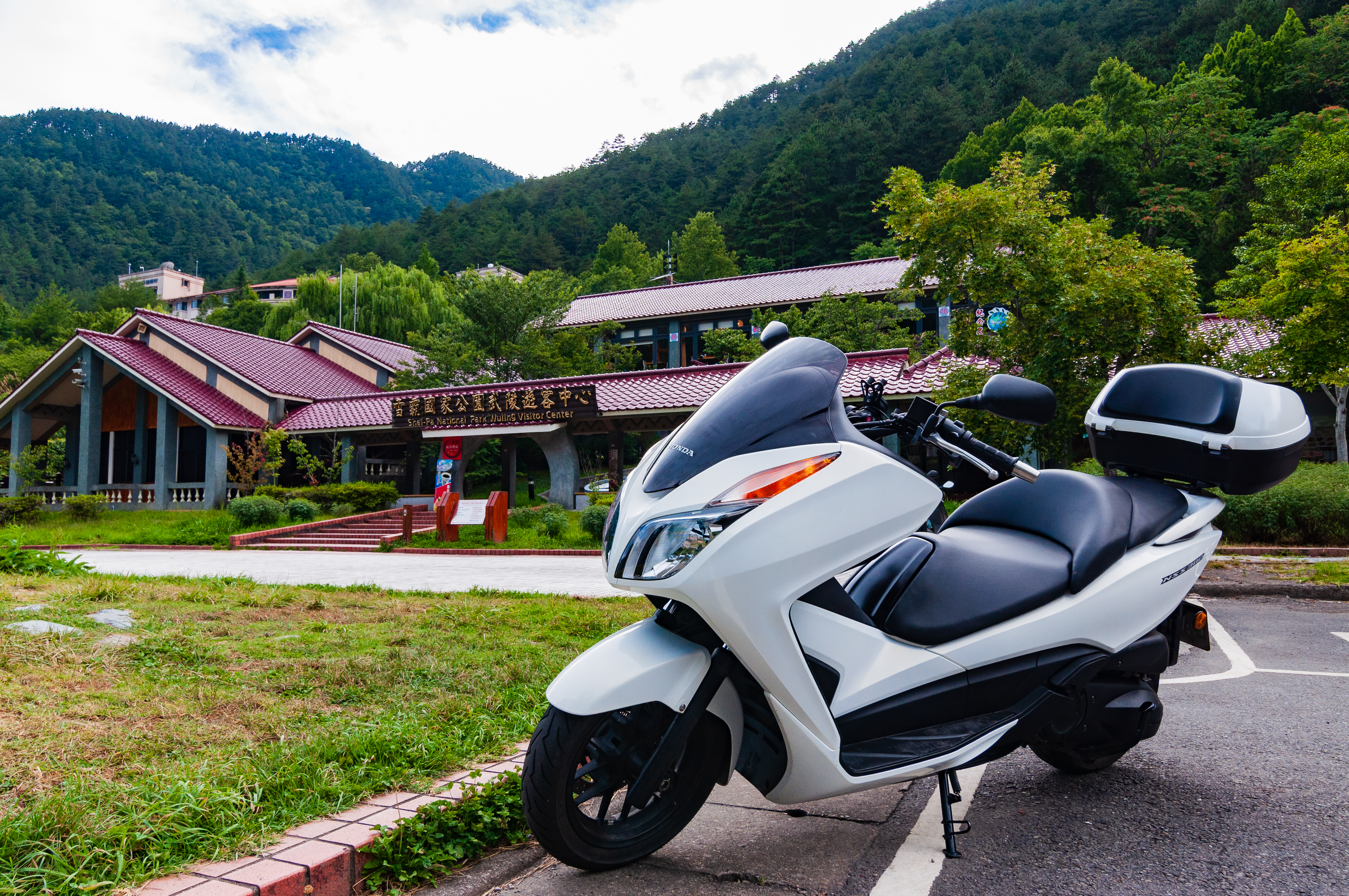
Maxi-scooter Honda NSS250

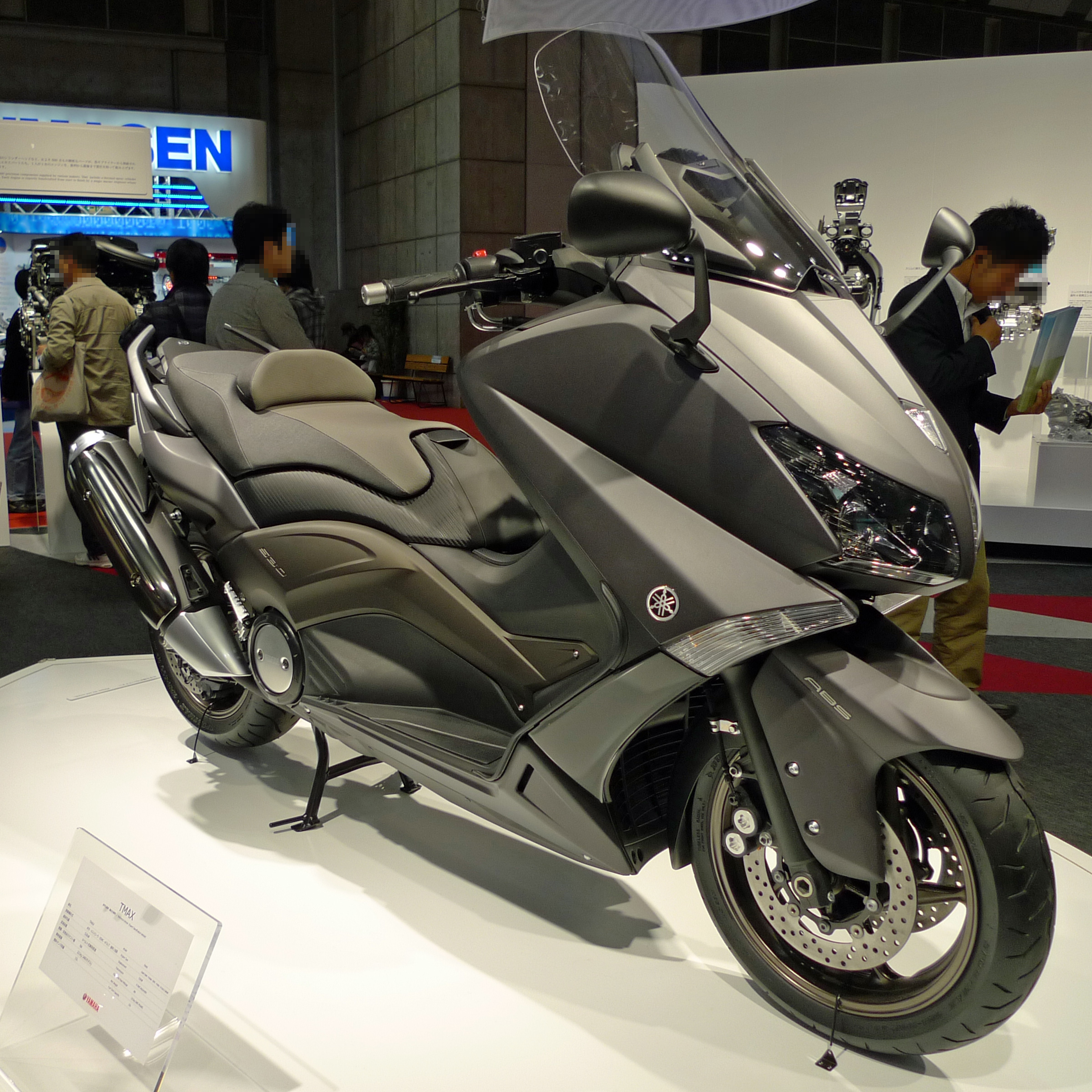
Mega-scooter Yamaha TMAX

== Underbones and mopeds ==
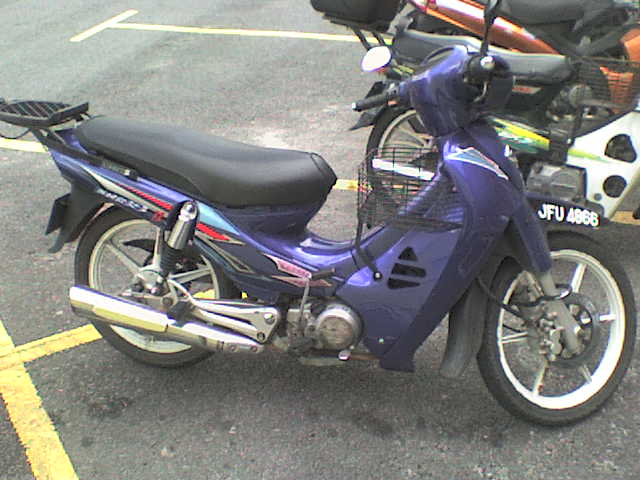
Modenas Kriss 120cc underbone

Underbones are small-displacement motorcycles with a step-through frame, descendants of the original Honda Super Cub. They are differentiated from scooters by their larger wheels and their use of footpegs instead of a floorboard. They often have a gear shifter with an automatic clutch.

The moped used to be a hybrid of the bicycle and the motorcycle, equipped with a small engine (usually a small two-stroke engine up to 50 cc, but occasionally an electric motor) and a bicycle drivetrain, and motive power can be supplied by the engine, the rider, or both. There are also Sport mopeds – a type of moped that resembles a sport bike.

In many places, mopeds are subject to less stringent licensing than bikes with larger engines and are popular as very cheap motorbikes, with the pedals seeing next to no use. Mopeds were very popular in the United States during the fuel-crisis of the late 1970s and early 1980s, but their popularity has fallen off sharply since the mid-1980s. In response to rising fuel prices in the first decade of the 2000s, U.S. scooter and moped ridership saw a resurgence. Sales of motorcycles and scooters declined 43.2% in 2009, and continued to decrease in the first quarter of 2010, with scooter sales doing worst, down 13.3% compared to a 4.6% drop for all two-wheelers.

Other types of small motorcycles include the minibike, monkey bike, Welbike, pocketbike, and pit bike.

== Enclosed and feet forwards ==
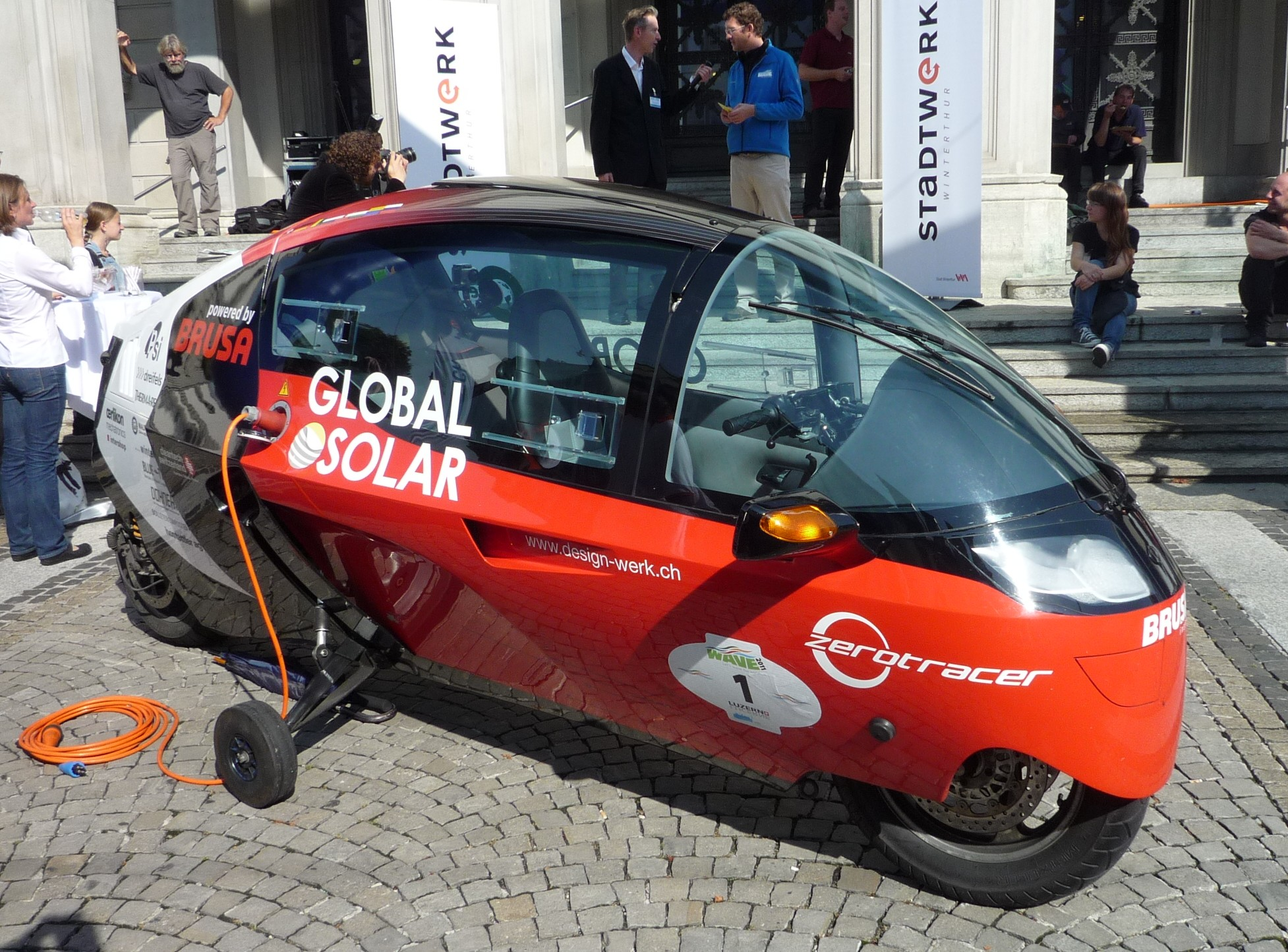
Zerotracer, winner of the Zero Emissions Race competition, is an electric feet forwards cabin motorcycle

Enclosed motorcycles include cabin motorcycles and streamliner motorcycles.

Feet forwards motorcycles include the 1911 Wilkinson TMC and the 1918 Ner-A-Car. Contemporary examples include the Quasar, powered by a Reliant Robin engine, and the Peraves range powered mainly by BMW K Series engines.

== Utility ==
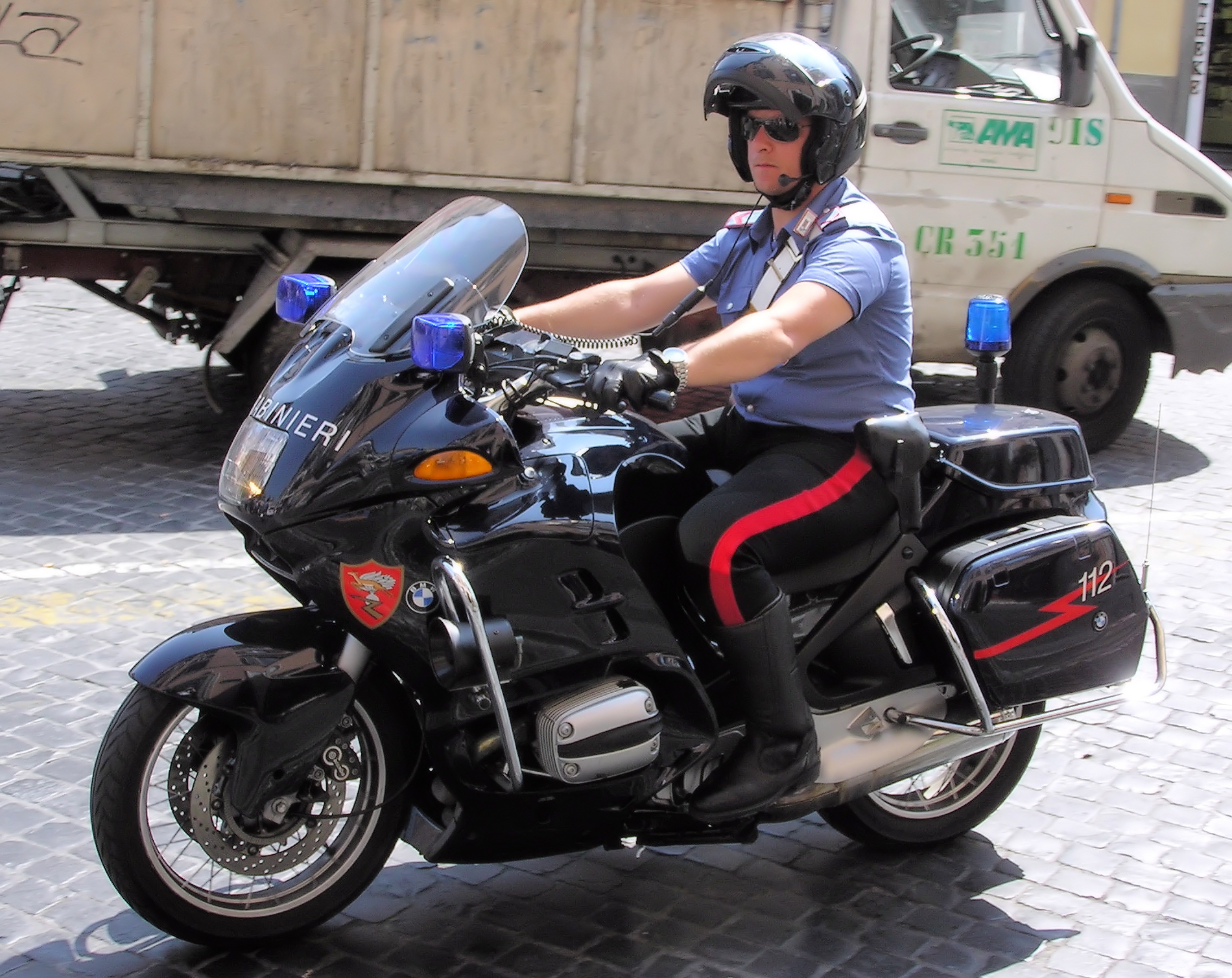
Police motorcycles are job-related motorcycles

Some motorcycles are specially adapted for specific job functions, such as those used by the ambulance, blood bikes, fire, and military services, and for specialized delivery services, such as pizza deliveries. Beginning in the 1960s with the Mountain Goat specialized motorcycles were developed for use on farms. Some people considerably prefer it for long road trips and biking expeditions. The Motocrotte (or cainette) was used in Paris to collect dog waste with vacuum suction in the 1980s and 1990s, and was still in use in other French cities as of 2016.

A derny is a motorized bicycle used for motor-paced cycling events.

== Tricycles ==
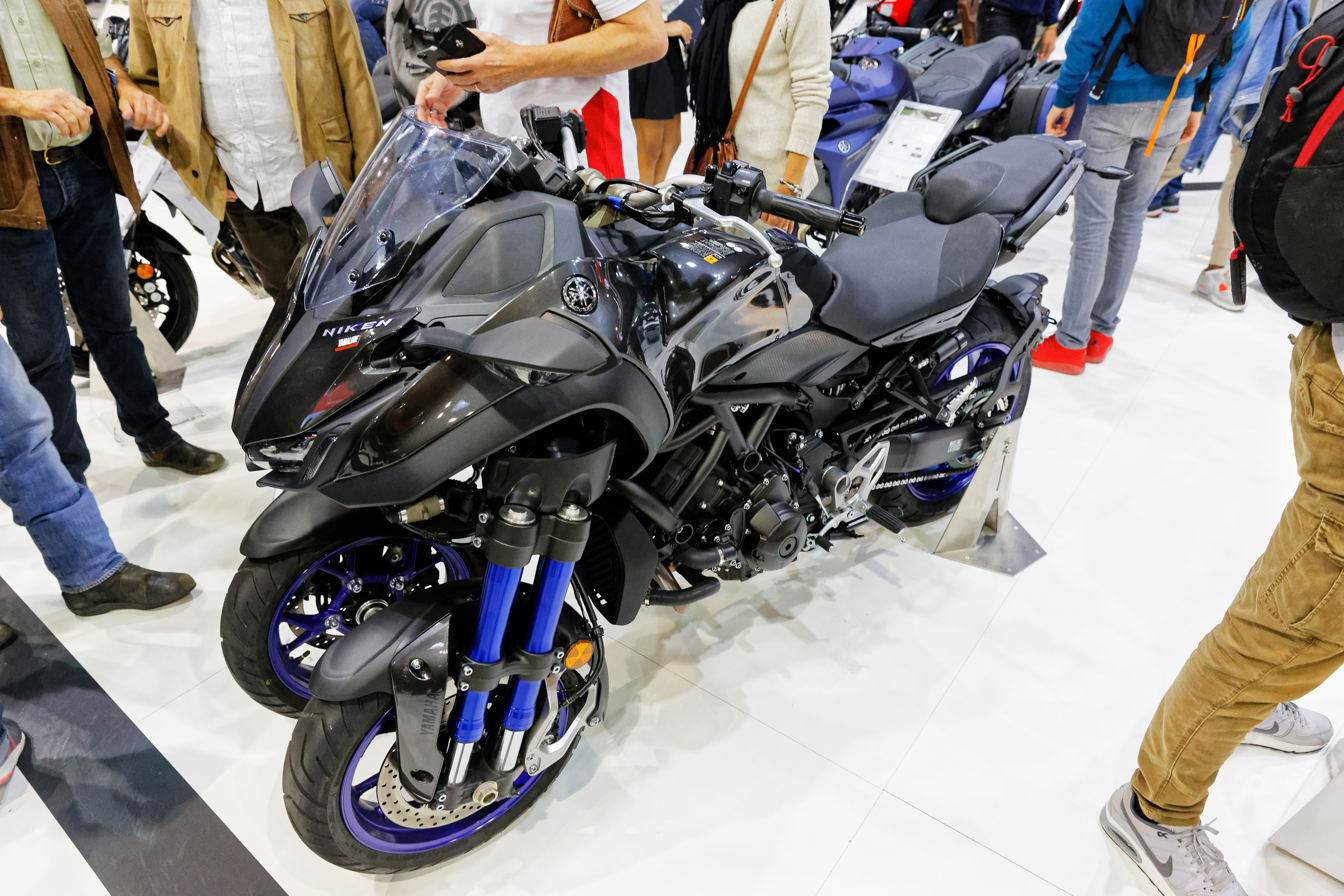
Yamaha Niken with three wheels

While motorcycles typically have two wheels, some motorized tricycles are classed as three-wheeled motorcycles. Some brands have made various types of three-wheelers direct from the factory. Most of these vehicles are treated as motorcycles for registration or licensing purposes.

Tilting three-wheelers keep all three wheels on the ground when they lean to negotiate curves. These include Honda's Gyro range, all of which have a front wheel that leans and a pair of rear wheels that do not, and the Piaggio MP3, which has two front wheels and a single rear wheel, all of which lean. The Yamaha Niken is also a tilting three wheeler but has smaller track width such that it is considered a motorcycle by some authorities.

== See also ==
- List of motorcycle manufacturers
- List of motorized trikes
- List of scooter manufacturers
- Motorcycling
- Outline of motorcycles and motorcycling
- Custom motorcycle
