= Cabin motorcycle =

Fully or partially enclosed motorcycle

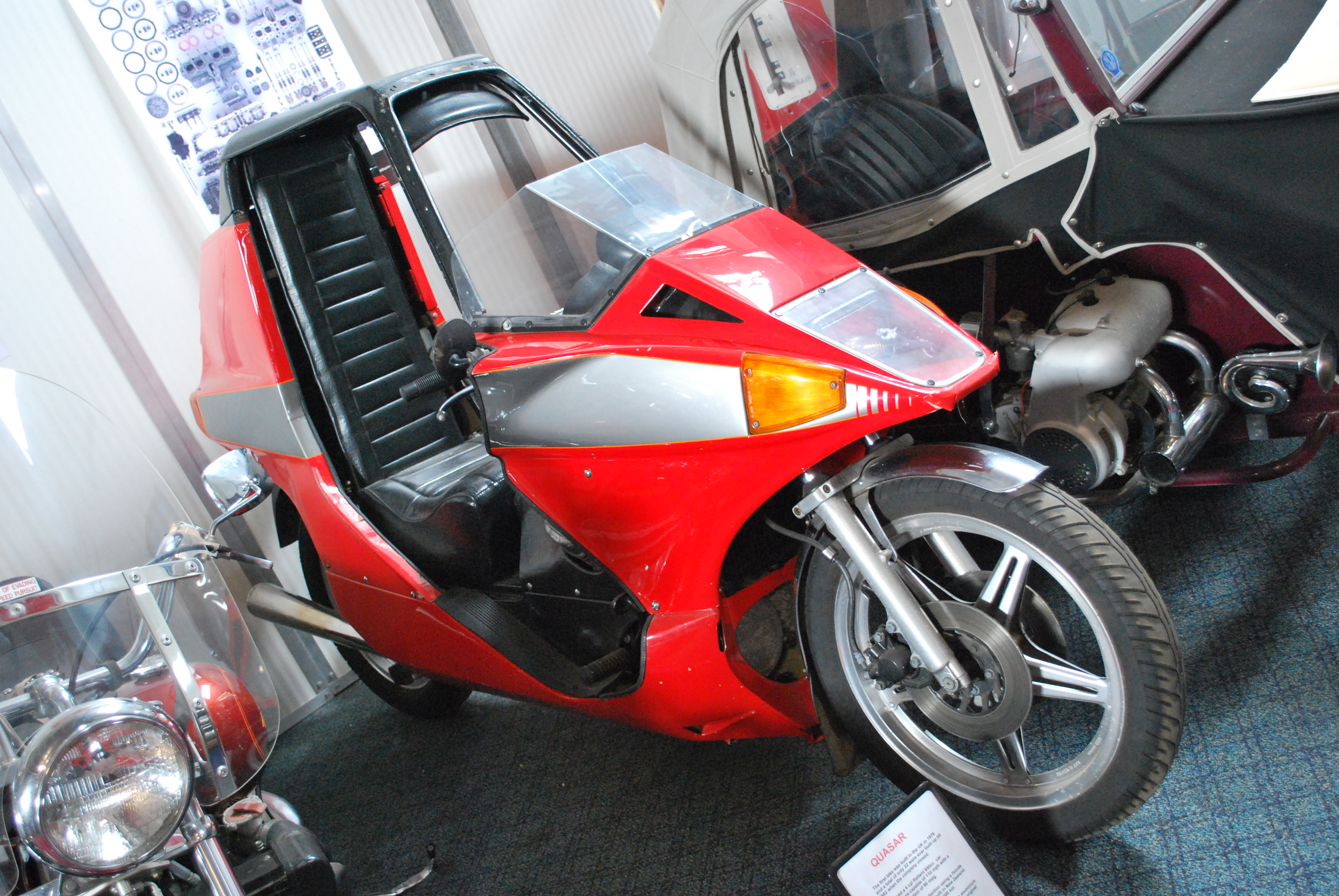
The Quasar, one of the first cabin motorcycles

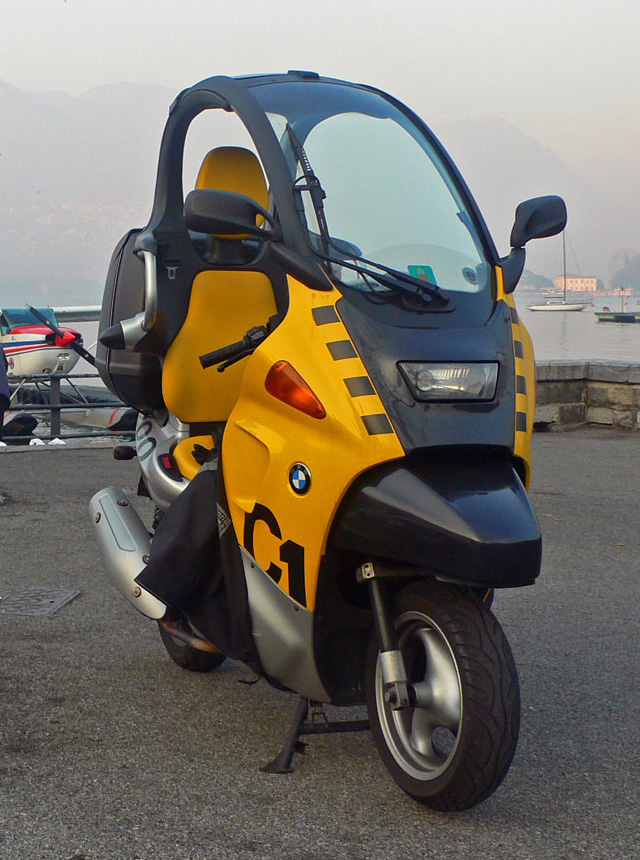
BMW C1

A cabin motorcycle is a fully or semi-enclosed motorcycle. They first appeared in the 1920s In parts of Eastern Europe, they are known as dalniks.

These fully enclosed non-production motorcycles used for land-speed record-breaking attempts, such as the NSU Delphin III, are known as streamliners.

== Manufacturers and models ==
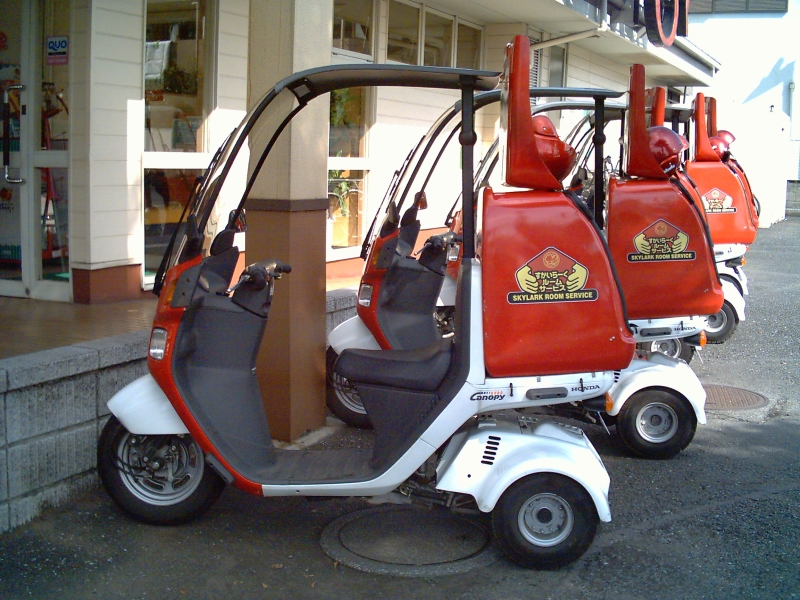
Honda Gyro Canopy

=== Fully-enclosed ===
- Lit Motors – C-1
- Peraves – Ecomobile, MonoTracer, E-Tracer, Zerotracer

=== Semi-enclosed ===
- BMW Motorrad – C1
- Benelli Adiva
- Honda – Gyro Canopy
- Quasar
- The Auto Moto
- Supine Exodus
