= Gyrocar =

Self-balancing two-wheeled automobile

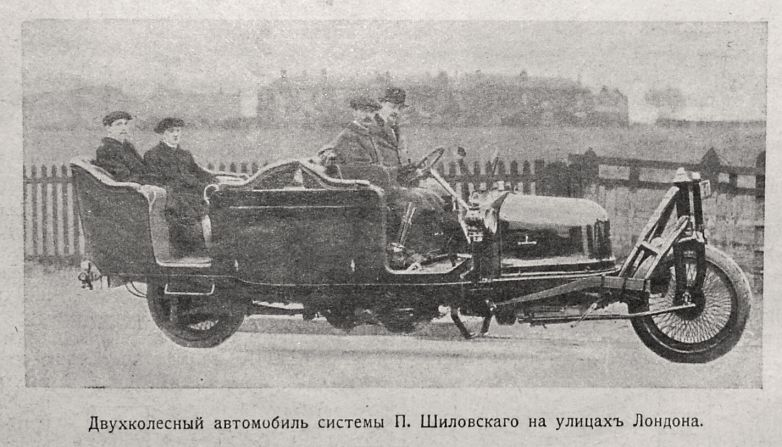
Shilovsky's gyrocar in 1914, London

A gyrocar is a two-wheeled automobile. The difference between a bicycle or motorcycle and a gyrocar is that in a bike, dynamic balance is provided by the rider, and in some cases by the geometry and mass distribution of the bike itself, and the gyroscopic effects from the wheels. Steering a motorcycle is done by precessing the front wheel. In a gyrocar, balance was provided by one or more gyroscopes, and in one example, connected to two pendulums by a rack and pinion.

The concept was originally described in fiction in 1911 "Two Boys in a Gyrocar: The story of a New York to Paris Motor Race" by Kenneth Brown, (Houghton Mifflin Co). However the first prototype Gyrocar, The Shilovski Gyrocar, was commissioned in 1912 by the Russian Count Pyotr Shilovsky, a lawyer and member of the Russian royal family. It was manufactured to his design by the Wolseley Tool and Motorcar Company in England in 1914 and demonstrated in London the same year. The gyrocar was powered by a modified Wolseley C5 engine of 16–20 hp (12–15 kW), with a bore of 90 mm and a stroke of 121 mm. It was mounted ahead of the radiator, driving the rear wheel through a conventional clutch and gear box. A transmission brake was fitted after the gearbox – there were no brakes on the wheels themselves. The weight of the vehicle was 2.75 tons and it had a very large turning radius.

In 1927, Louis Brennan, funded to the tune of £12,000 (plus a £2000 per year) by John Cortauld, built a rather more successful gyrocar. Two contra-rotating gyros were housed under the front seats, spun in a horizontal plane at 3500 rpm by 24V electric motors powered from standard car batteries. This was the greatest speed obtainable with the electric motors available, and meant that each rotor had to weigh 200 lb (91 kg) to generate sufficient forces. Precession was in the vertical fore-aft plane. The car had a Morris Oxford engine, engine mountings, and gearbox. Two sidewheels (light aircraft tailwheels were used) were manually lowered on stopping; if the driver forgot and switched off the gyros and walked away, the car would continue to balance itself using the gyro momentum for a few minutes, and then the wheels would automatically be dropped to stop tipping.

== See also ==
- Ford Gyron
- Cabin motorcycle
- Cyclecar
- Gyro monorail
- Segway PT
- Sharopoyezd
- Bicycle and motorcycle dynamics
- Bi-Autogo, another 2-wheeled car
- Self-balancing unicycle
- Lit Motors
