= Pyotr Shilovsky =

Russian inventor and politician (1872–1955)

- Пётр Петрович Шиловский
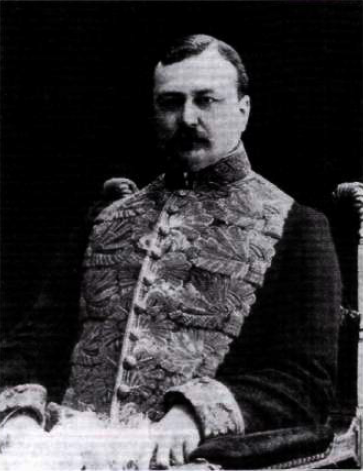
- Born: Pyotr Petrovich Schilovsky; September 22, 1872
- Died: June 30, 1955 (aged 82); Herefordshire
- Occupation(s): Inventor politician
- Known for: Inventing the gyrocar

Pyotr Petrovich Schilovsky (Russian: Пётр Петро́вич Ши́ловский) (September 22, 1872 – June 30, 1955 in Herefordshire) was a Russian count, jurist, statesman, and governor of Kostroma from 1910 to 1912 and of Olonets Governorate from 1912 to 1913. He is best known as the inventor of the gyrocar, which was built under his direction by the Wolseley Tool and Motorcar Company beginning in 1912, and was demonstrated for the first time in London in April 1914. In 1922, Schilovsky emigrated to the United Kingdom.

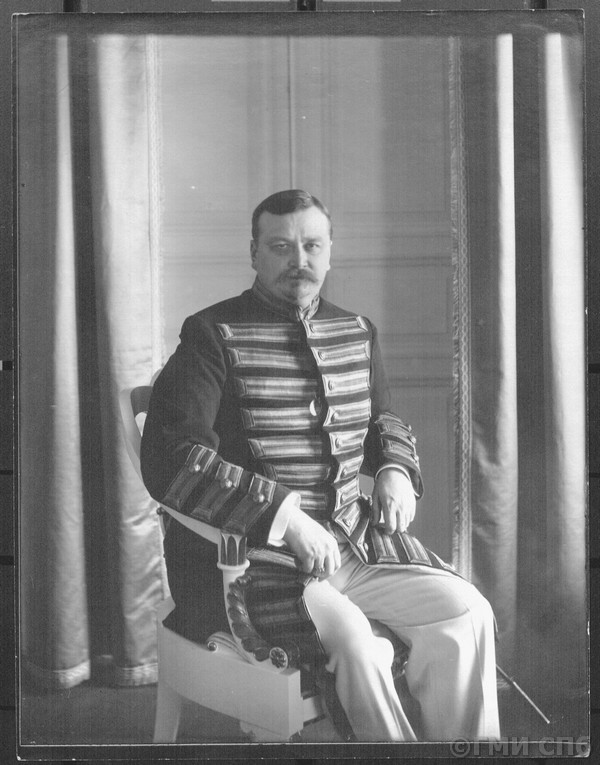
P. P. Shilovsky in 1913

== Gyrocar ==
After developing a model gyro monorail in 1911, he designed a gyrocar which was built by Wolseley Motors Limited and tested on the streets of London in 1913. Since it used a single gyro, rather than the counter-rotating pair favoured by Brennan and Scherl, it exhibited asymmetry in its behaviour, and became unstable during sharp left hand turns. It attracted interest but no serious funding.

The gyrocar was rediscovered in 1938, when workmen uncovered its remains in the Ward End property of Wolseley. Although it had been buried it was said the chassis was in excellent condition, the engine turned over and the gyros still pivoted, the main issue was damage to the aluminium bodywork. After being excavated, it was transferred into the Wolseley Museum.In 1948, Wolseley had run out of storage space and the remains were scrapped
