= Ecomobile =

Cabin motorcycle

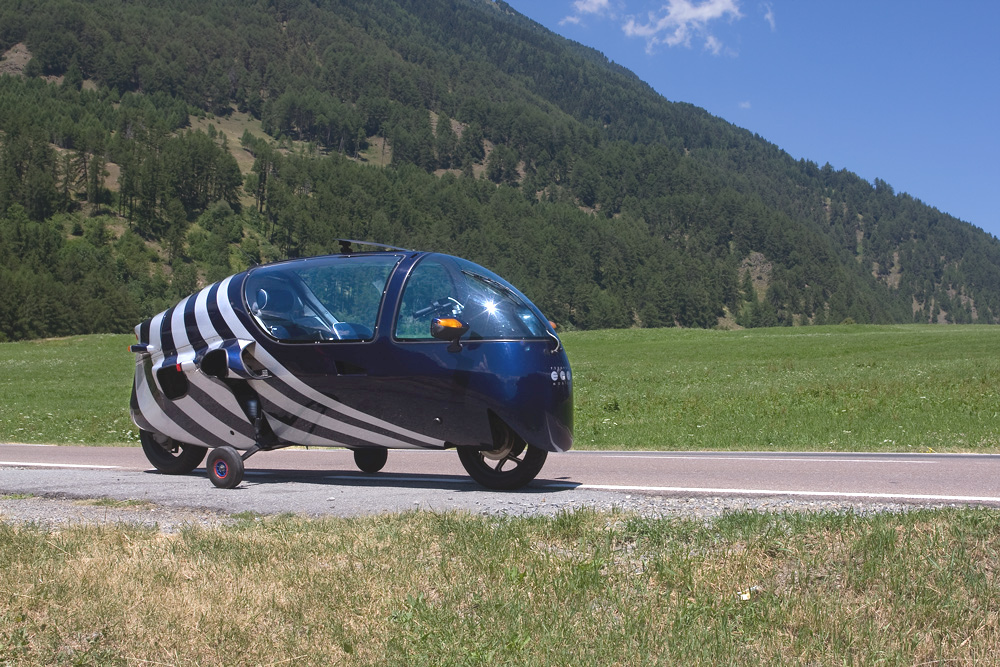
Peraves Ecomobile (standing with extended support wheels)

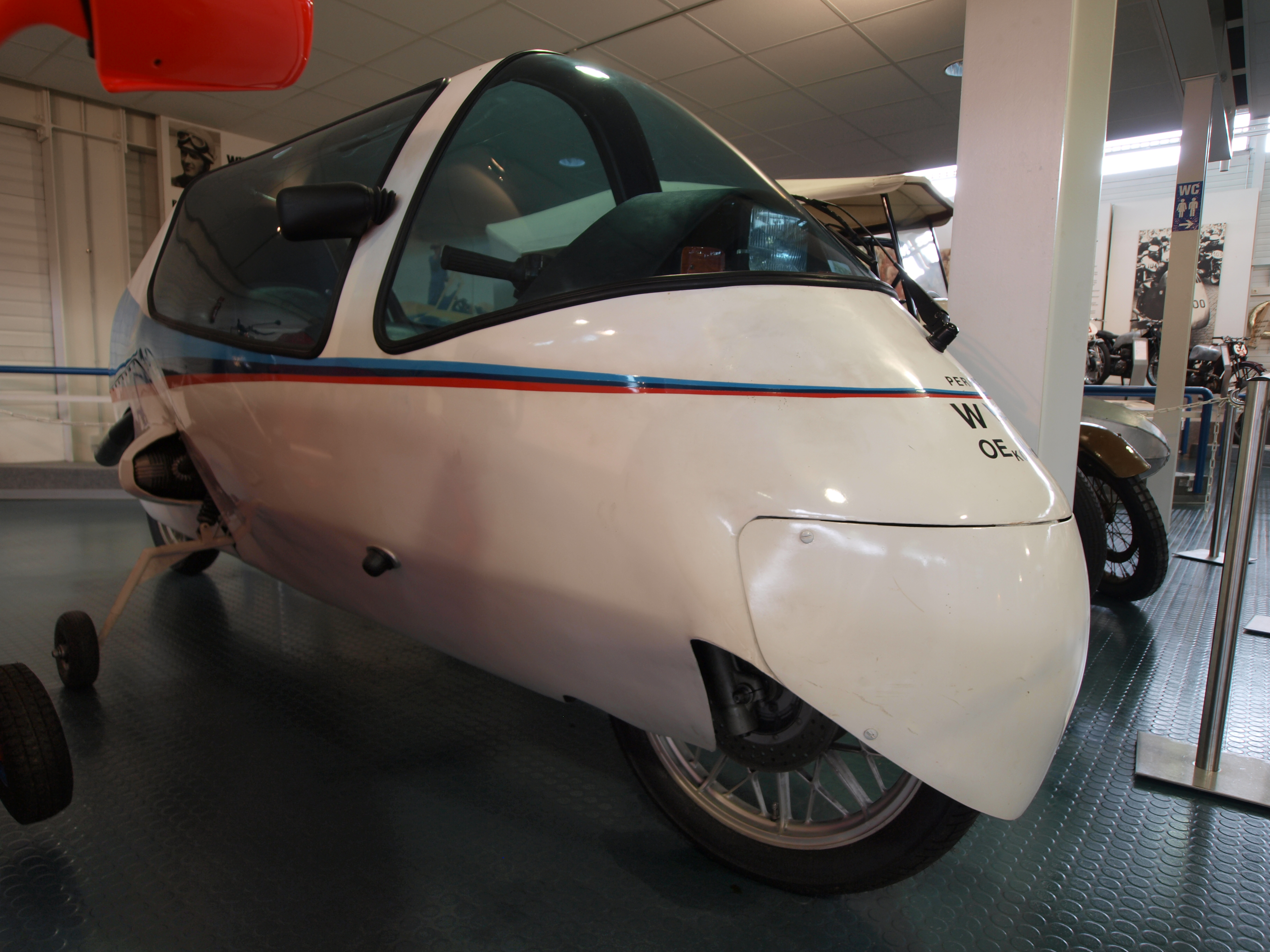
Ecomobile with BMW-R motor (first generation)

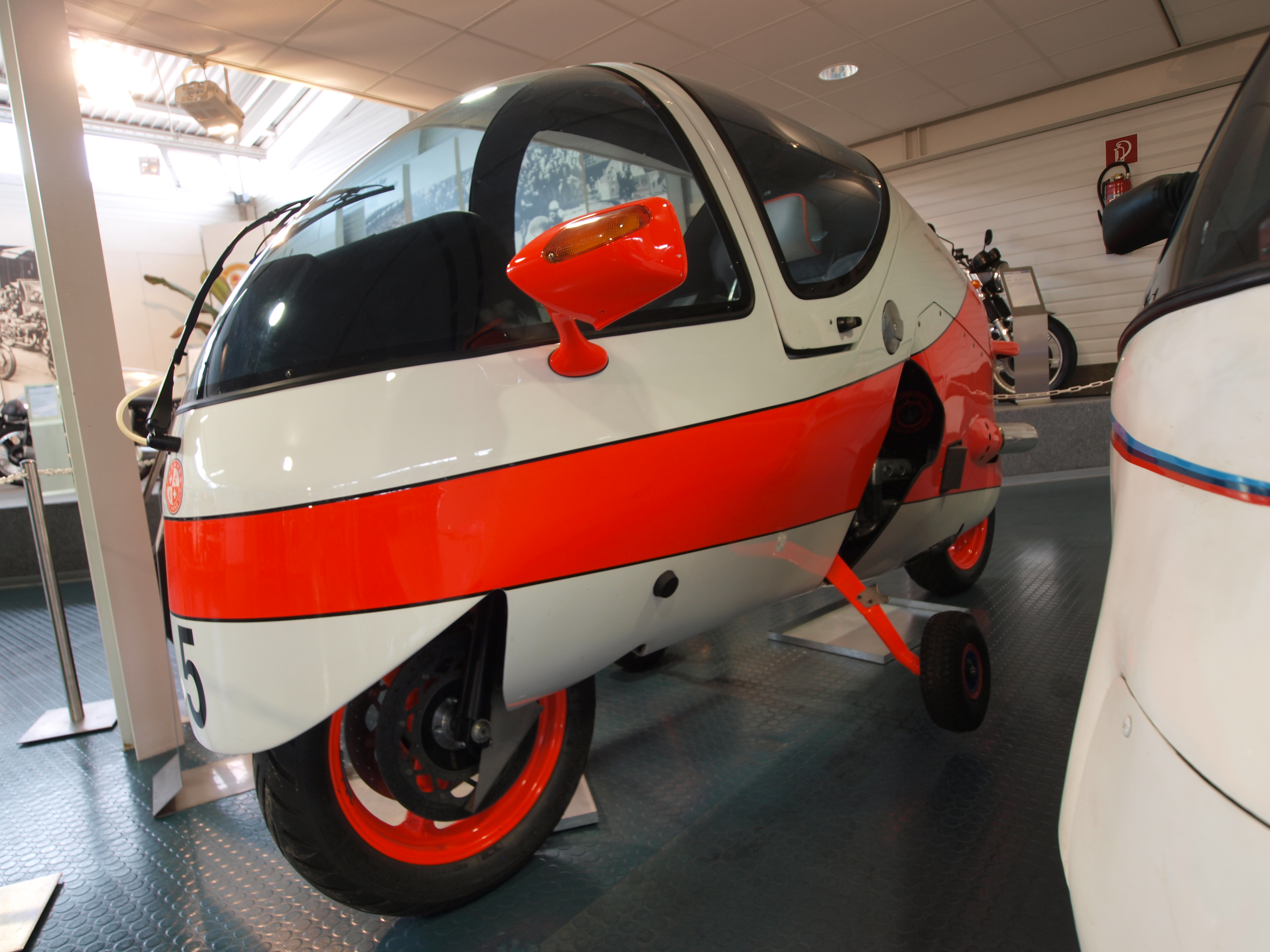
Ecomobile with BMW-K-Motor

The Ecomobile is a cabin motorcycle produced by Peraves AG, manufactured in Winterthur, Switzerland since 1984.

== History ==
Arnold Wagner of Switzerland received a patent in 1983 for a support device for a single-track vehicle, a requirement for cabin motorcycles, for which he also received a patent in 1984.

=== ECO ===
The first vehicles were manufactured in 1984 under the name "Oemil" (OEkoMobIL) or "Peraves Oemil" with a BMW R 100 engine through S/N 5003, and a BMW K 100 offered after that. Since Peraves wanted to avoid confusion with the eco-movement, the "OEkoMobIL" in "Ecomobile" was renamed "ECO" (internal name W18 K5). By 2005, 91 ECOs powered by BMW K-type engines had been manufactured.

=== MonoTracer ===
In 2006, the MonoTracer was released, using BMW K 1200 RS engines; individual specimens with turbocharging and up to 190 hp (140 kW) are said to have reached a top speed of 315 km/h (196 mph). Fifty-eight MonoTracers were built, of which twelve were made with electric drive, called MonoTracer-MTE-150. In 2010, the two prototypes of the MonoTracers MTE (also called X-Tracer) won the $2.5 million X-Prize with far the best efficiency of > 200 mpg-e equivalent consumption 1.1 L/100 km (260 mpg_{‑imp}; 210 mpg_{‑US}).

From 2009, vehicle production had been partly outsourced to the joint venture Bohema Mobil and Peraves CZ in Brno-Medlanky (Czech Republic). In October 2014, Peraves AG filed for bankruptcy and was dissolved.

The technology will continue to be offered (as of 2016) from the Czech Republic. For trademark reasons, the vehicle was renamed MonoTracer Monoracer. At the end of 2016, the production of the gasoline-powered model was to be discontinued and, from 2017, only a battery-electric variant would be offered.

==== Zerotracer ====
The Zerotracer is an electric powered MonoTracer, purpose-built for the Zero Emissions Race.

=== MonoRacer ===
In 2020 Peraves AG released four models. Each has a 140 L (4.9 cu ft) storage compartment, driver and passenger seat with a 3-point seat belts .

- MonoRacer-130-E, with 400 km (248.5 miles) battery pack.
- MonoTracers-E with battery swap option.
- MonoRacer-K12 with gasoline BMW-engines.
- MonoRacer adapted (electric or petrol) for drivers with disabilities, hands driven.

== Construction ==
The MonoTracer is 3.65 m (12.0 ft) long, 1.52 m (4 ft 11.8 in) high, and 1.25 m (4 ft 1.2 in) wide with a curb weight of 485 kg (1,069 lb). The two occupants sit one behind the other, secured by three-point belts. The vehicle body is made of aramid fiber reinforced plastic with laminated steel tube or cast aluminum reinforcement parts. In the rear of the vehicle is a luggage area. The aerodynamic drag coefficient is low due to a c_{d} of 0.19 (cf., Porsche Cayman c_{d} 0.29, unfaired motorcycle c_{d} 0.7) and the small frontal area of around 1 m^{2}. The BMW K1200RS engine of 85 kW (114 hp) gives a top speed of over 240 km/h (150 mph). Fuel consumption is 3.6 L/100 km (78 mpg_{‑imp}; 65 mpg_{‑US}) at 90 km/h (56 mph) and 4.4 L/100 km (64 mpg_{‑imp}; 53 mpg_{‑US}) at 120 km/h (75 mph).

To make the closed cab practical, hinged support wheels are mounted on both sides. These are lowered or raised by a switch on the handlebars. To prevent false actuation, such as stalling or under-speeding, or inadvertent deployment at high speeds, a computer system blocks such actuation errors as a function of speed and lateral acceleration. The driver will be alerted by green lights indicating possible lifting or lowering. If the supports, which require about 0.5 seconds to extend, are not extended at walking speed, a warning tone will sound. If the driver does not respond with lowering, the vehicle tilts on its side while stationary. The retracted support wheels catch the fall softly and the vehicle takes no damage. In fast corners, with an inclination of 52 to 55 degrees, it is possible to bring the retracted, inner-curve support wheels on the ground and to negotiate the curve on three wheels.

The drive is purchased from BMW: four-cylinder motorcycle engines from either the BMW K100 (Ecomobile) or BMW K1200RS (MonoTracer) which develop between 90–130 hp (67–97 kW). The five-speed motorcycle transmission has been modified to give the driver four forward gears and one reverse gear. MTE electric vehicles are powered by Brusa or AC Propulsion MTE engines.

== Licensing ==
For driving license purposes, the Ecomobile and MonoTracer are treated by governments as a motorcycle, and requires a Class A (motorcycle) driving license in the EU. Driving such a cabin motorcycle requires some training. In particular, the driver must be aware that due to vehicle's smaller size, they may not be perceived by drivers as readily as other, larger vehicles.

== See also ==
- Alternatives to car use
- Bicycle and motorcycle geometry
- Velomobile
