= Lit Motors =

American cabin motorcycle developer

Lit Motors Inc.
- Type: Private
- Industry: Transport
- Founded: February 2010; 16 years ago
- Founder: Daniel K. Kim
- Headquarters: San Francisco, California, U.S.
- Key people: Daniel Kim
- Products: Electric vehicles

Lit Motors Inc. is a San Francisco-based startup founded by Daniel K. Kim in 2010. Lit Motors designs conceptual two-wheeled vehicles with a focus on innovative technologies, including the AEV (Auto-balancing Electric Vehicle), often referred to as the "C-1," a fully electric, gyroscopically stabilized vehicle, and the Kubo cargo scooter.

The inspiration for Lit Motors came to Kim in 2003, when he was injured by a chassis while manually assembling a bio-diesel Land Rover Defender 90. This experience led Kim to "chop a car in half," leading to the creation of the C-1 concept.

Since 2011, the company has developed a number of prototypes, but as of July 2025, has not given an exact release date for a production model.

== Legal Issues ==
Lit Motors has been sued by four early investors, resulting in approximately $300,000 in legal judgments against Lit Motors and an arrest order against Kim for failure to appear at court hearings related to these lawsuits. On January 7, 2020, a San Francisco court granted a motion assigning Lit Motor's US patents to the plaintiffs in this lawsuit and restraining Lit Motors from selling its patents. Later in January a settlement was reached and paid, and the patents were reassigned back to Lit.

== Designs ==
=== AEV / C-1 ===
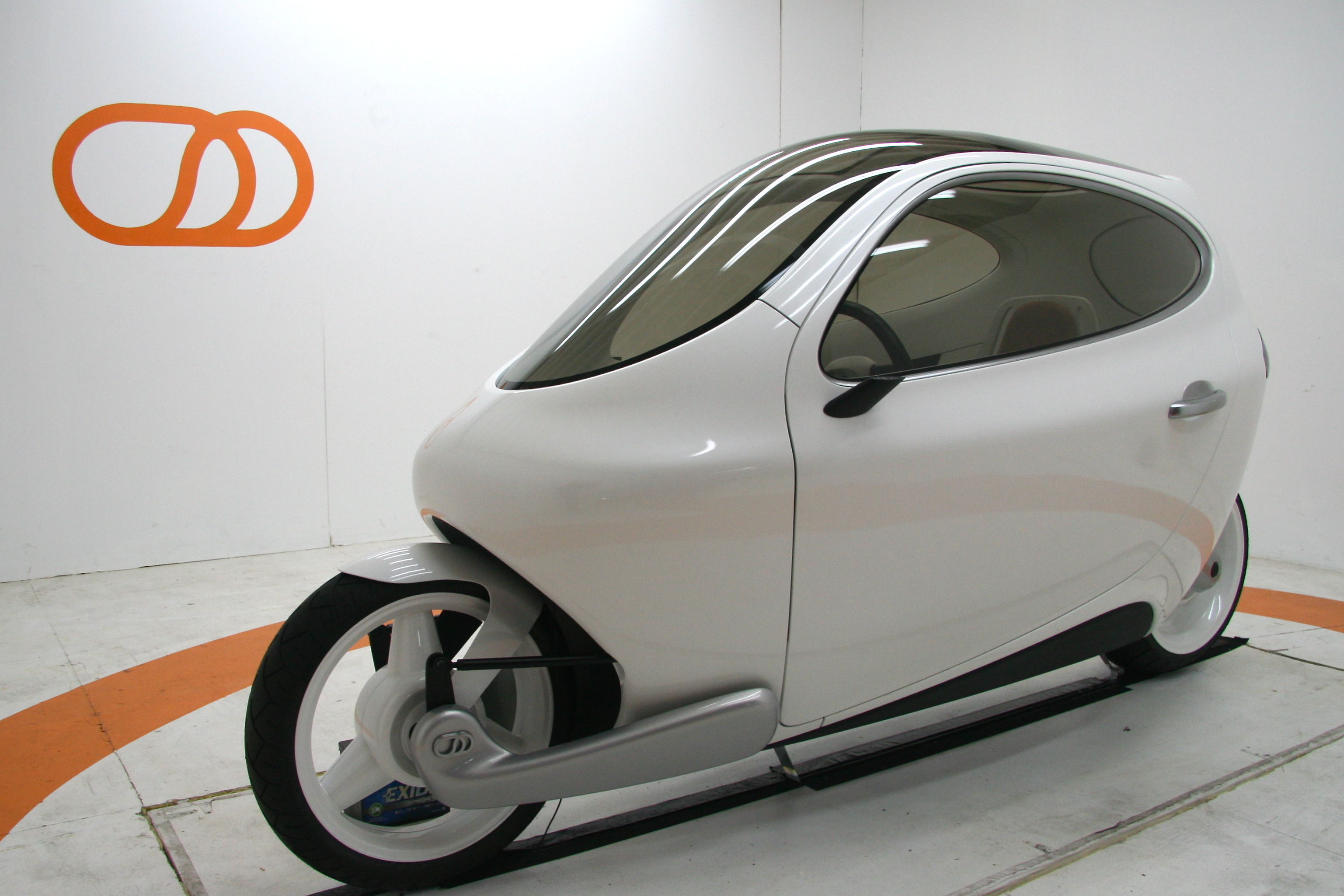
C-1

Early in 2010, the company revealed a non-functioning show model of the C-1. This version showcased an enclosed two-wheeled vehicle self-balanced by two single-gimbal control moment gyroscopes, to be powered by lithium iron phosphate batteries. Design specifications and computer renderings indicated that it could hold a second passenger seated in the area directly behind the driver's seat in a semi-reclined position, with their legs straddling the front seat.

Similarly to a motorcycle, the original C-1 design has two wheels, but uses a small steering wheel instead of handlebars. The show model featured direct-drive in-hub motors in both wheels designed to provide a high amount of torque, stability, and traction control, while allowing for the body form to be about half the size of a car. However, recent prototypes show neither wheel with direct drive, indicating that the design may be undergoing changes.

Safety features are intended to include a steel unibody chassis, seat belts, airbags, and a gyroscope stability system.

Release	Balancing gyroscope Torque	Gyroscope Spin Up	Motor Output	Top Speed	Range per charge	Charge time
N/A	800Nm	<70 seconds	2 x 20 kW	100+ mph	170 miles*	4-6 hrs

*Range per charge based on a constant speed of 60 mph, coefficient of drag of 0.2, and battery capacity of 13kWh, according to information on the company's Wefunder page.

==== Production timeline ====
In 2011, the company announced plans for a first small production run in 2013, with the intention of selling the C-1 for $16,000. This initial price would vary depending on the state and federal tax incentives available at the time. The company began taking pre-order deposits through a tiered system priced from $250 to $10,000.

At the November 2012 Gigaom Roadmap Conference, a Lit representative said that the company had "another couple years’ engineering work before it's really ready to go on a small scale production. By a couple, I mean a year, two years or so, and then another couple years after that to scale to a big manufacturing." In a later interview by Gigaom, Daniel Kim stated that the C-1 was still about 2 to 2.5 years from production, indicating an expected production time frame of May - November 2015.

In May 2014, in an article by Forbes, Kim said that the company was “working around the clock to get something that is ready for production within eight months,” with 20 full-time employees at Lit at the time the article was published. Lit continued to post updates in 2015 showcasing an early-stage development prototype.

On March 14, 2015, Kim was involved in a motorcycle accident on the Laguna Seca Raceway. Kim suffered numerous injuries, necessitating an extended hiatus from leading development on the C-1 as he recovered. In February 2016, Forbes released an article on Lit Motors that discussed the effect of Kim's injuries on development and included a new production timeline: "Today [Daniel Kim] is close to securing a new round of funding–a year later than planned. The money will be used to facilitate the next challenging stage of growth: building infrastructure from the ground up. His plan is to have a production-ready prototype in 24 months."

On May 24, 2016, at the Pioneers.io Festival, Danny Kim presented on the Lit AEV stating, "I know that if we put 20 million dollars into our bank account today, we'll be able to deliver it in 2 years - 24 months." A September 22, 2016 Forbes article speculated on Lit Motor's past and future, suggesting a possible future acquisition by Apple. Forbes also commented on the lack of progress due to low fundraising: "Despite Kim’s grand vision, few investors were willing to bet on the company. In six years, Kim has raised less than $5 million." During 2016, Lit Motors removed the ability to accept pre-order deposits. Company postings throughout the rest of 2016 on social media continued to show a rough model "EP-4" prototype driven at low speed.

In 2018, Lit temporarily ceased email newsletters and social media updates. In mid-September, Lit launched a reconfigured website, though with no new progress updates. The website would receive additional changes in the following years.

On April 1, 2022, Lit Motors began posting company updates on their website, with the first post on their blog summarizing company developments that had occurred in the last few years: Kim returning to the company in 2019 after recovering from his motorcycle accident; the company relocating to a design lab in Portland, OR; and the hiring of new personnel, including new VPs for Controls, Embedded Systems, and CMGs. Lit closed out the post by announcing a new funding goal of $9 million to develop a fully drivable prototype.

In January 2023, Lit announced that they would be reopening preorders in February of the same year, with a goal of 10,000 pre-order sales by 2026. Also in February, Lit announced a partnership with Mirko Konta, the CEO of Ideenion. Later, in June, Lit was granted a patent for a new control system developed for use in future C-1 prototypes. In August, Lit announced the hiring of Stefan Schäper, an ex-Audi employee, as the VP of Chassis and Integration.

On February 20, 2024, Lit Motors launched a fundraising campaign on Wefunder with a funding goal of $5 million. As of July 2024, they have raised approximately $1.3 million of this goal. On April 1, 2024, Lit announced the development of a new “pathfinder” chassis to serve as “a low cost iteration exploring our new vehicle architecture and validate our new embedded and balance system at a standstill.”

In March 2025, Lit Motors participated in the ARPA-E Innovation Summit held in Washington, D.C., where the company showcased recent advancements in its core technology. During the event, Lit Motors demonstrated the effectiveness of its proprietary control model, which validates the performance of its dynamic vehicle platform. This control system is based on a clean-sheet dynamic model and utilizes a pair of custom-designed sub-scale gyroscopes.

This development marks a significant milestone for the company, as the controls—now running on a production-ready embedded system—are both functional and scalable. The updated control model addresses limitations present in the previous prototype (EP-4), enabling improved system responsiveness and precision. With the planned integration of Stability Augmented Steering, the platform is expected to enhance the auto-balancing electric vehicle’s (AEV) suitability for everyday driving.

=== Kubo ===
The Kubo is a cargo scooter design dubbed the "pick-up truck of the developing world." Initial designs were for a fully electric scooter run on lithium iron phosphate batteries, designed to carry cargo boxes measuring up to 22 in. by 22 in. by 22 in. and weighing up to 300 pounds. With a top speed of 35 mph, it would have a range of at least 50 miles per charge. In an interview from May 28, 2013, Kim detailed the Kubo design as using lithium polymer batteries with a 40-45 mile range, with the ability to use the cargo space to hold additional batteries to extend the range to 200 miles. He claimed that by summer of 2013, a small production run of 5-10 units would occur, followed by 100–1,000 units in another 6 months time, before ramping up to 50,000 - 200,000 units for full production. He also claimed a selling price of $500–$800USD in China, and $2,000–4,000 in the United States.

In December 2013, Kubo was launched on Kickstarter with July 2014 delivery expected, but Lit Motors fell far short of meeting its funding goal with only $56,667 pledged of the $300,000 goal. Despite only 10 backers having pledged between $5,000 and $6,000 to purchase the Kubo scooter, Lit Motors affirmed that they are "definitely continuing with kubo!" in an update on the campaign. As of July 2024, current information on the company website is limited to basic details about the vehicle and its purpose.

== See also ==
- Gyrocar
- Elio Motors
- Aptera Motors
- Peraves Ecomobile
- Toyota i-Road
- Yamaha Tricity
- BMW C1
- Carver One
