= The Auto Moto =

- Company type: Private
- Industry: Motor scooters
- Founded: Los Angeles, California
- Headquarters: Los Angeles, California
- Website: www.theautomoto.com

TheAutoMoto.com Corporation is a wholesale powersports distribution company based in Los Angeles, with its primary warehouse in Van Nuys, California. TheAutoMoto.com Corporation currently specializes in a partially enclosed three-wheel tilting scooter called The Auto Moto.

== Products ==
The Auto Moto is a three-wheel scooter powered by a 150cc single cylinder 4 stroke engine with an automatic CVT transmission and positraction rear wheels. It incorporates a rocker system that allows the cab to rock from side to side while carving through turns, all the while keeping its two back wheels and engine firmly planted on the ground. The Auto Moto gets a claimed 83 miles per US gallon (2.8 L/100 km; 100 mpg_{‑imp}), making it more fuel-efficient than most hybrid cars on the market. The Auto Moto features an FM radio player with MP3 connection that plays music through its integrated stereo system. Other standard features included on The Auto Moto are a built in 72 liter trunk, 2 dashboard storage compartments, an ABS braking system for the front disc brake, a cell phone call recognition system, seating for two, an alarm system, and a full windshield with windshield wiper. Being that The Auto Moto has three wheels, some states only require the use of a regular car driver license to operate it.
