= Zerotracer =

Electric vehicle

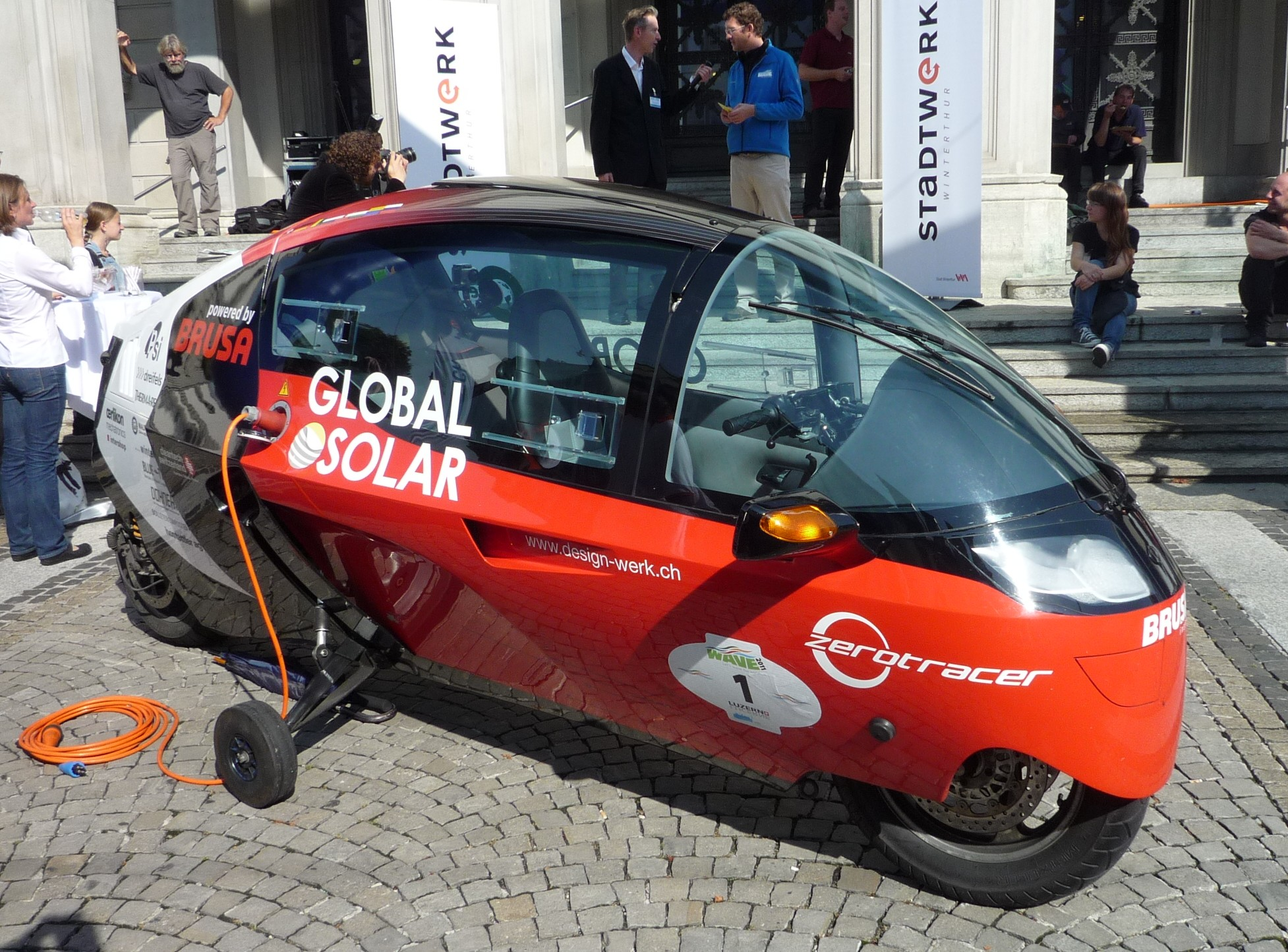

Overview
- Manufacturer: Designwerk
- Also called: Ecomobile
- Production: 2009

Body and chassis
- Platform: MonoTracer
- Related: Peraves

Powertrain
- Engine: Electric

Dimensions
- Length: 3,650 mm (143.7 in)
- Width: 1,400 mm (55.1 in)
- Height: 1,520 mm (59.8 in)

The Zerotracer is a purpose-built Electric vehicle for the Zero Emissions Race which went around the world in 2010/11. The vehicle, based on the MonoTracer by Peraves AG of Switzerland, seats two in a closed cabin, while its driving characteristics are more similar to a motorbike. The race started under UNEP patronage on 16 August 2010 in front of the Palace of Nations at Geneva where it ended on 24 February 2011 completing 80 days of travel – inspired by Jules Verne's novel, Around the World in Eighty Days. Of the only three vehicles completing the race, Zerotracer accumulated the highest score of points to win.

== Zero Emission Race Route ==
Geneva – Bruxelles – Berlin – Kyiv – Moscow – Chelyabinsk – Almaty – Ürümqi – Shanghai – Vancouver – US West Coast – Cancún 2010 United Nations Climate Change Conference – Casablanca – Geneva.

== Performance and development ==
Zerotracer covered the through route from Geneva to Shanghai without any breaks caused by technical problems. This is due to its fully developed concept deriving from the Monotracer, a very similar concept using a petrol engine. Manufacturer Designwerk is considering commercial production of the vehicle.
