= Zero Emissions Race =

Trip around the world using solar energy

The Zero Emissions Race is an annual trip around the world, launched in Geneva in 2010 by Louis Palmer, a Swiss teacher who had previously driven an electric car dubbed the "Solar Taxi" around the world primarily powered by solar energy. That journey took 18 months and was completed in December 2008.

== Solar Taxi (2006 - 2008) ==
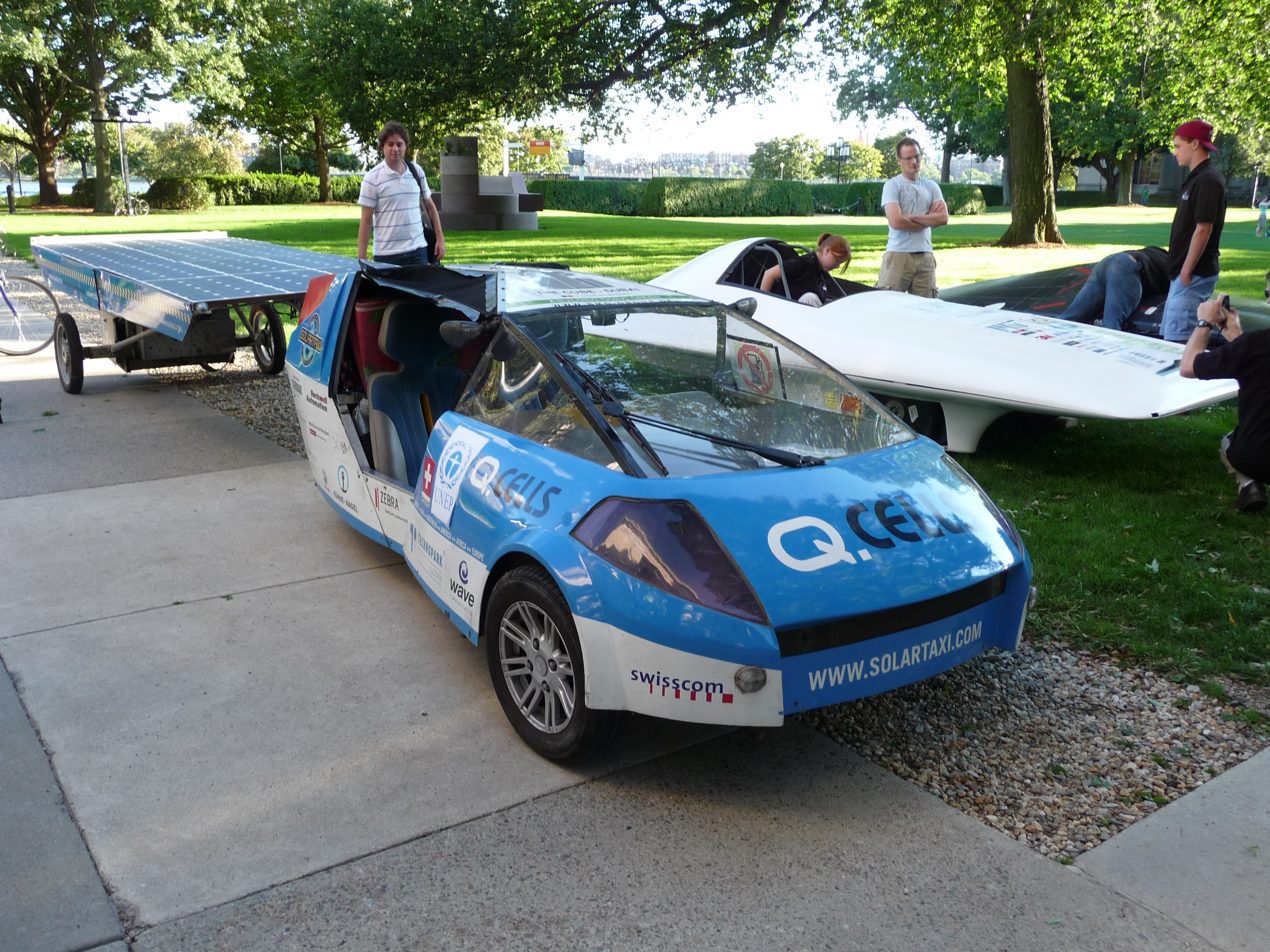
Palmer's Solar Taxi

Before the Zero Emissions Race Palmer covered 54,000 kilometers (34,000 mi) in a custom made EV called the "Solar Taxi", a small, lightweight two-seater vehicle. He trailed a solar array with 12 solar panels behind him. The panels generated electricity, which was stored in batteries, also located in the trailer. Thus, the Solar Taxi is essentially a solar-charged vehicle, rather than a solar vehicle, meaning the energy created by the solar panels is first stored in batteries, rather than being tapped to directly, and immediately propel the vehicle forward.

The Solar Taxi could travel for 300 kilometers on a single charge and reach speeds of 90 kilometres per hour (56 mph).

Passengers included UN Secretary-General Ban Ki-moon, Monaco's Prince Albert, Hollywood filmmaker James Cameron, New York Mayor Michael Bloomberg and Sweden's Prime Minister Fredrik Reinfeldt.

== Zero Emissions Race (2010 - 2011) ==
After his historic solar-powered trip around the world, Palmer followed up by organizing the Zero Emissions Race. With the Zero Emissions Race, Palmer invited international teams to drive their own cars around the world. The only condition is that the energy used by each electric vehicle be offset by the generation of electricity via renewable energy forms (sun, wind, wave, geothermal, etc.) at designated production facilities in the racers' home countries. Four teams took up Palmer's invitation and, as of October 2010, they are in the midst of an 80-day EV journey around the world.

The First Annual Zero Emissions Race began on August 16, 2010 in Geneva, Switzerland and headed east. After exactly 80 driving days, 30,000 kilometres (19,000 mi) and 17 countries the race arrived back to Geneva on February 27, 2011. "With this race we want to show, that seven billion people on this planet need renewable energy and clean mobility", said Palmer. "Petrol is running out, and the climate crisis is coming... and we are all in running against time." The winner of the race (by points) became Zerotracer.

The event was sponsored by Canadian Solar, among others.

Palmer is a strong advocate of electric vehicles and especially the electric vehicle + renewable energy mix. "People love this idea of a solar car," Palmer told the BBC outside the venue of the COP14 UN climate talks. "I hope that the car industry hears...and makes electric cars in future."

With the Zero Emissions Race, which Palmer hopes will run every two years, Palmer is seeking to further sell the public on the idea of battery powered vehicles whose "engines" are filled with renewable energy-generated electricity.

"The success of ZERO Race depends on the number of people reached and inspired enough to take action towards a more sustainable way of life," said Palmer. "Growing traffic and environmental pollution are situations that are just asking for solutions. The ZERO Race is very much about showing realistic ways towards a cleaner and greener future for the planet and its people."

Palmer says that he hopes that a two-seater electric vehicle with a range of 155 miles (250 km) will eventually be sold for as little as US$12,820.

== See also ==
- Alternative fuel vehicle
- Electric vehicle
- Photovoltaics in transport
- Solar vehicle
- Solar-charged vehicle
