= Alligator (motorcycle) =

Motorcycle design

- Manufacturer: All American Racers
- Production: 2002–? (limited to 36)
- Class: Feet forwards motorcycle
- Engine: 710 cc Honda XR650 single-cylinder

The Alligator is a feet forwards motorcycle built by Dan Gurney Alligator Motorcycle Company which is the motorcycle division of the former driver/racing team owner's All American Racers workshop in Santa Ana, California. Although not the first of such design, it is unique for its unconventional low-slung seating position which allows for its low center of gravity.

== History ==
The bike design traces itself back to the pioneering era when Gottlieb Daimler designed a similar prototype in 1886, since then the conventional seating position has been used on all bikes with the exception of the few bikes like the commercially successful Ner-a-car and unsuccessful Quasar.

The bike design was first instigated when Gurney took a 1976 Honda XL350 as a base to develop the first design evolution known as the A-1 (a.k.a. "Grandpa Gator") and was completed in 1980.

The bike was named after the reptile of the same name, due to the bike's long, low appearance and was also chosen to reflect the North American nature of the species.

After several years of R & D, with eighty nine different riders consisting of professional motorcycle and car racers, prominent bike enthusiasts, engineers, journalists and regular Sunday riders to help develop the bikes through test rides along with Gurney's busy schedule running a team, six different prototype configurations all have logged thousands of miles before Gurney and his team decided on a sixth evolution, the A-6, with full fairing to be launched in 2002 with an intention to build no more than 36 as it was the number that appeared on the Eagle-Weslake Formula One racer which won the 1967 Belgian Grand Prix. The bike is then made available to consumers for $35,000, considering its price, beside its rare nature of the bike with a carbon fiber body over a chromoly frame powered by a 70 horsepower (52 kW) single-cylinder Honda XR650 engine, bored out to 710 cc, which is capable of 140 mph (230 km/h) and 0-60 mph in 3.1 seconds. The weight of the Alligator is 320lbs.

In 2002 AAR announced plans to build an updated version of the Alligator, called the 'Instigator', which was to be powered by a 1,820 cc S&S V-twin engine, but production never began.
