= Feet forwards motorcycle =

Class of motorcycle design

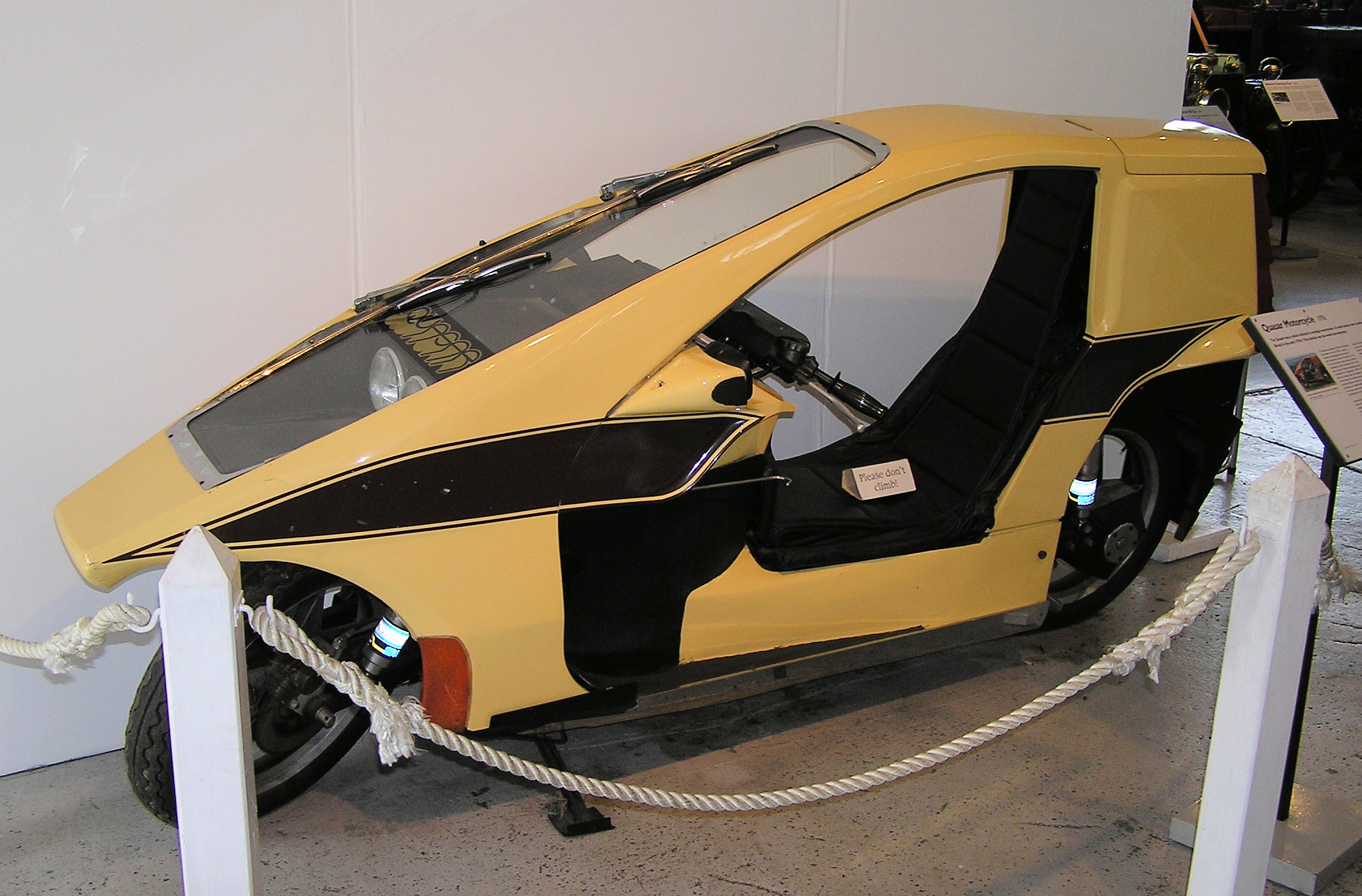
Quasar, an early FF motorcycle

A feet first (FF) motorcycle is a class of motorcycle design which positions the rider with their feet ahead, like a car, rather than below and astride, as with conventional bikes. As there are other types of motorcycle (e.g. choppers) that have a 'feet forward' position, an alternative term sometimes used is advanced single track vehicle. The name "feet first" (also referred to as "feet forward") was first used by Royce Creasey.

== History ==
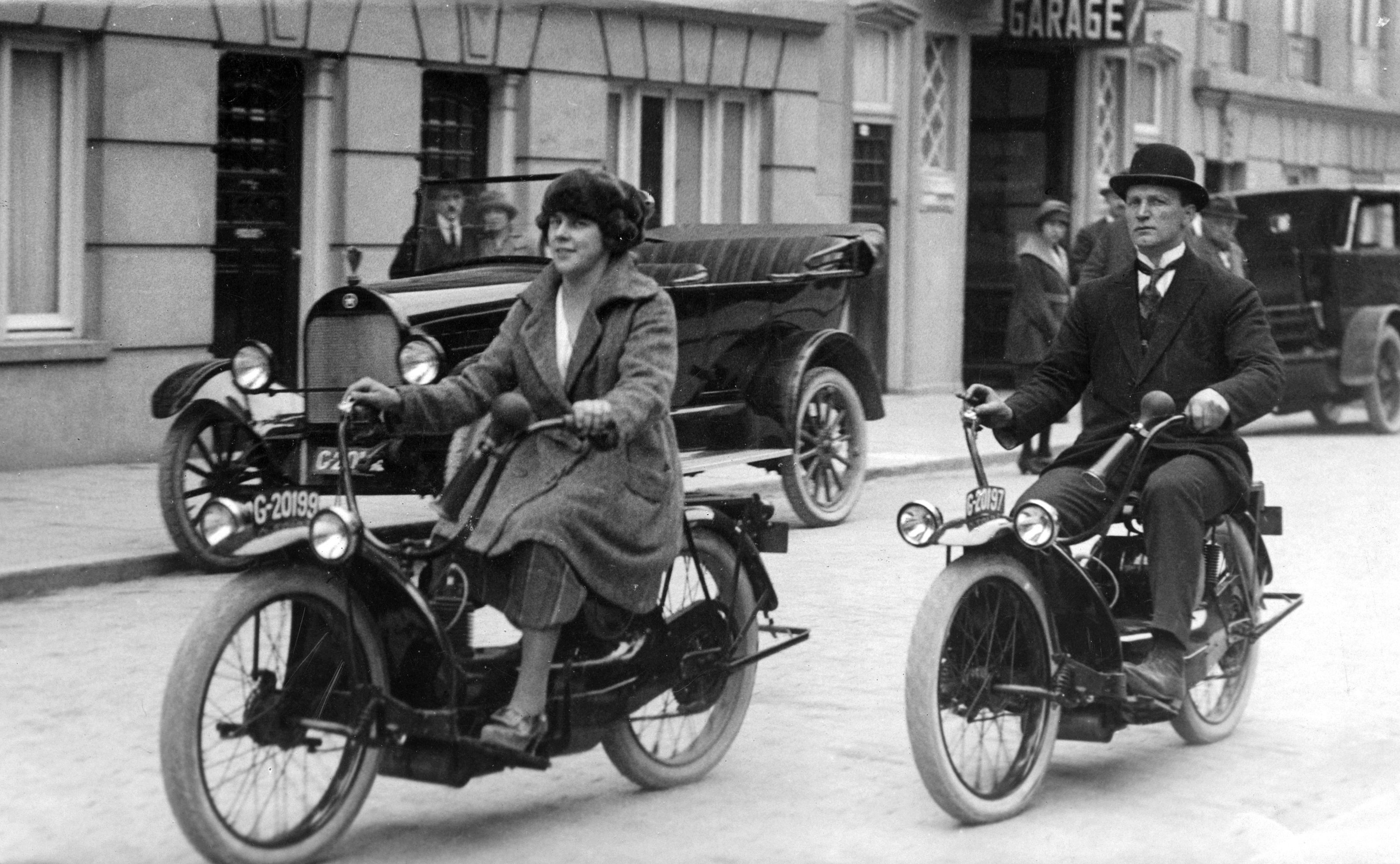
Ner-A-Cars in the Netherlands, 1923

Designers have experimented with the feet forward riding position since the early days of motorcycling.

In 1909 P.G Tacchi designed a four-cylinder machine with a 700 cc 'L' head air-cooled engine, an enclosed shaft drive and a bucket seat. The machine was known as a TAC-Wilkinson, and was manufactured by the Wilkinson Sword Company.

Ten years later in America Carl A. Neracher designed the Ner-a-Car It had a feet-forward riding position, a pressed steel frame and hub centre steering but in other respects was somewhat similar to a conventional motorcycle.

Designed by Sir Alliot Verdon Roe in 1926, the Ro-Monocar used a 250 cc Villiers two-stroke engine, and featured a high degree of enclosure for the rider and a bucket seat. This seating position provided a high degree of comfort for the rider.

The Fred Wood designed Whitwood monocar used OEC duplex steering, retractable outriggers, and tandem bucket seats, and was offered with engine sizes ranging from 250 to 996 cc between 1933 and 1935.

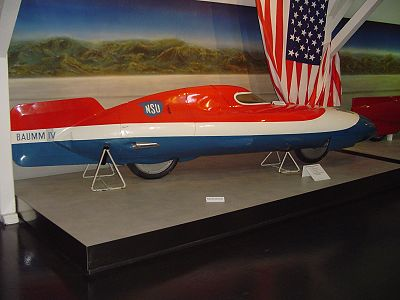
1950s NSU Baumm IV record bike

In the 1950s NSU produced the feet forward fully enclosed monocoque constructions by Gustav Adolf Baumm (1920–1955). The "Flying Hammock" riding position allowed an exceptionally small frontal area. The consequent low wind resistance made it possible for H.P. "Happy" Mueller to achieve 150 mph (241 km/h) from a 125cc engine at the Utah Salt flats in 1956.

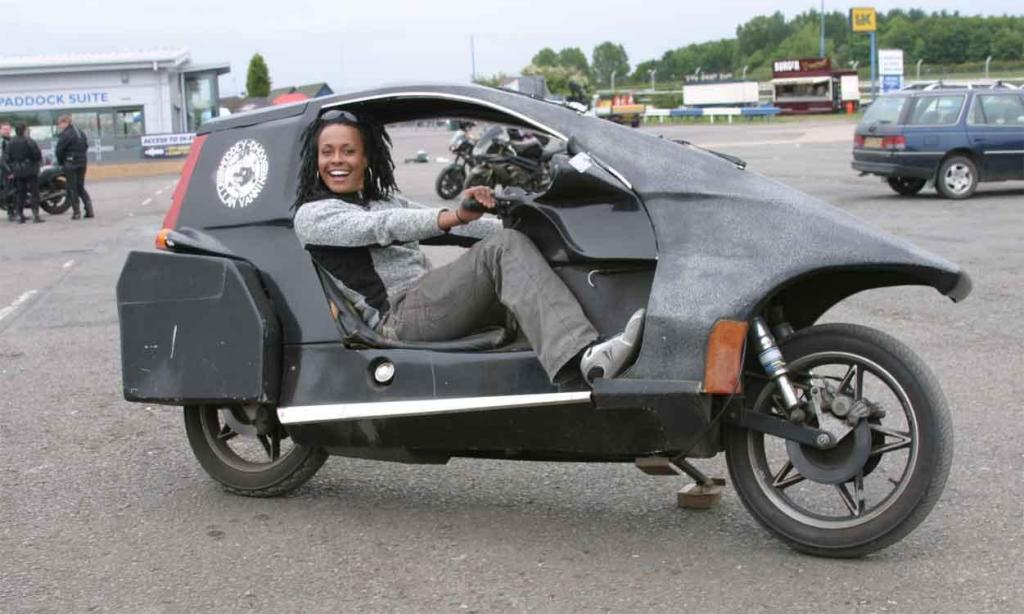
Motorcycle journalist Jane Omorogbe riding a Quasar

The first recognisably modern design was the 1975 Quasar, built by Malcolm Newell and Ken Leaman. The design was not a great commercial success – just 22 examples were sold up until 1982 – but it generated a great deal of interest, and started others thinking about the FF concept. Thomas Engelbach's own design of a feet forward motorcycle came in 1980, with the innovative patent for an automatic stabilizing system that incorporated outrigger wheels. The design was successfully tested but proved that the market was not ready for this model.

Since 1985 Swiss manufacturer Peraves has produced a small series of feet forward cabin motorcycles; 89 Ecomobile were built from 1985 to 2005. The restyled Peraves Monotracer appeared in prototype form in 2006 and went into production in 2007. Following the outstanding successes of the all-electric E-Tracer, X-Tracers and Zerotracer the MonoTracer-E MTE-150 went into production in 2012 and the company ceased making the petrol driven MTI-1200. The company website said they would make a maximum of 36 vehicles per year from 2013 but production ceased with no more than some ten all-electric machines built.

In 1989 the Royce Creasey designed Voyager achieved a pre-production run of five prototypes made by SCL Ltd in Powys South Wales

=== 21st century ===
In 2002, Dan Gurney's All American Racers produced a limited run of 36 Alligator models.

The early 2000s saw enclosed scooters like the Benelli Adiva and BMW C1.

In 2008, the Buddfab Streamliner set the speed record for a 50cc engine at 145 mph (233 km/h) with 20+ hp, then in 2009 the 125cc speed record at 186 mph (299 km/h). The Honda RS125 engine used produces 44 ps.

In 2010, Dutchman Allert Jacobs, creator of the Quest velomobile, streamlined a Honda Innova underbone motorcycle to more than double the fuel economy from 1 liter per 48 km (113 mpg) to 1 per 101 (237mpg).

In 2013, Suprine Machinery, Inc and designer John Chelen, introduced the EXODUS, a 1200cc BMW flat four with five speeds and reverse, where the rider is safely surrounded by a roll cage and a skid plate. Only weighing 680 pounds, with a full 8 gallon gas tank, the EXODUS exceeds speeds of 155 MPH with over 80 MPG at 55MPH.

In March 2014 Honda unveiled the Honda NM4 model at the Osaka Motorcycle Show and it was on sale worldwide by the end of the year. In the United States it uses the original 700cc engine, whereas in Europe it has a 750cc engine. All versions use Honda's Dual Clutch Transmission (DCT) system to provide both automatic and semi-automatic control.

In 2024 the Thai company Rapid unveiled the K-1988 e-bike at the Bangkok International Motor Show as a homage to the 1988 movie Akira where a feet-forwards motorbike is portrayed. A similar design using a “Ceramic double-rotor two-wheel drive” and a twin-cylinder Kawasaki motor in an entirely custom-made frame, with dual single-sided swingarms front and rear and hub-centre steering has been under development.

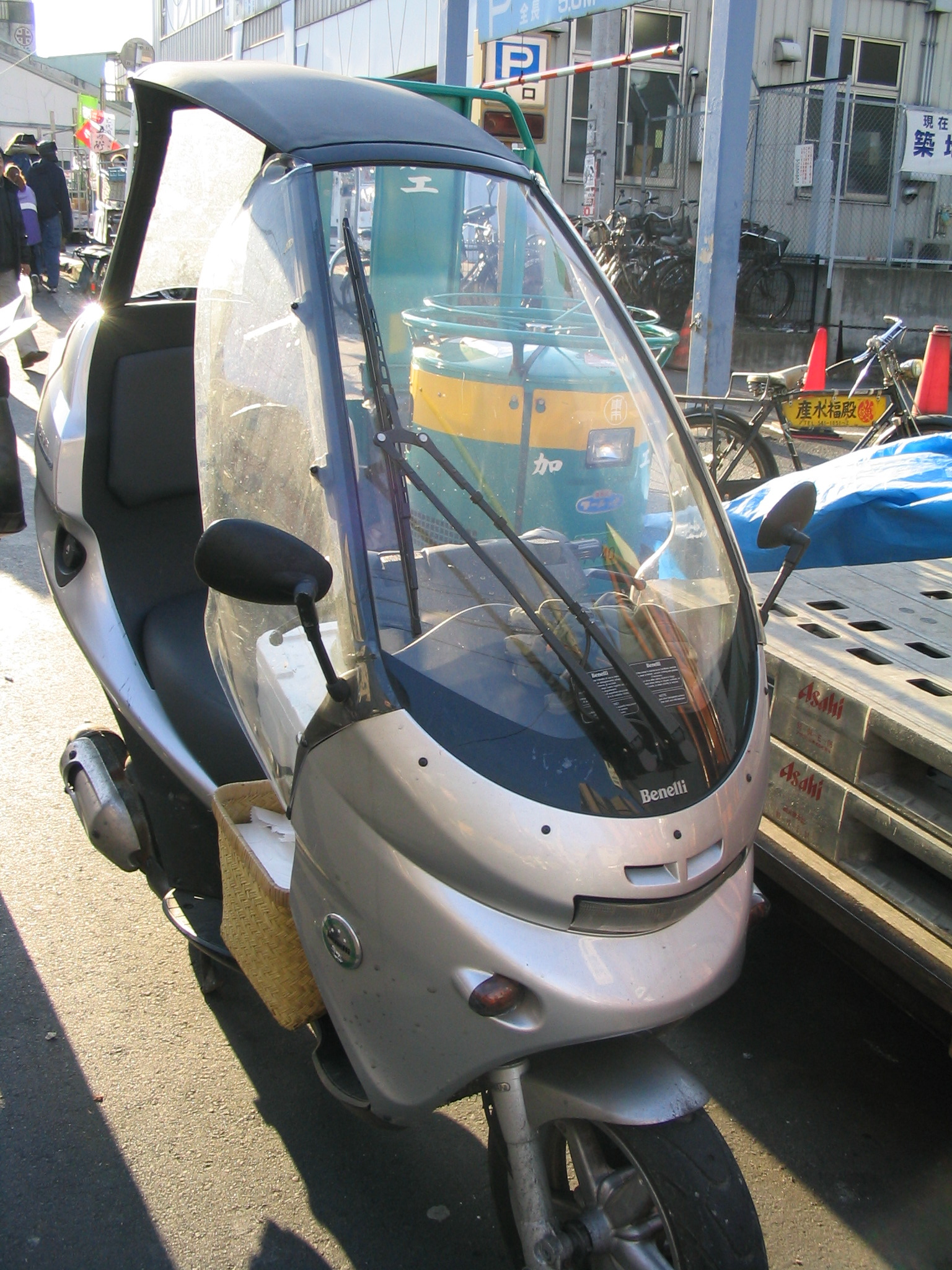
The Benelli Adiva is a convertible; the roof folds away

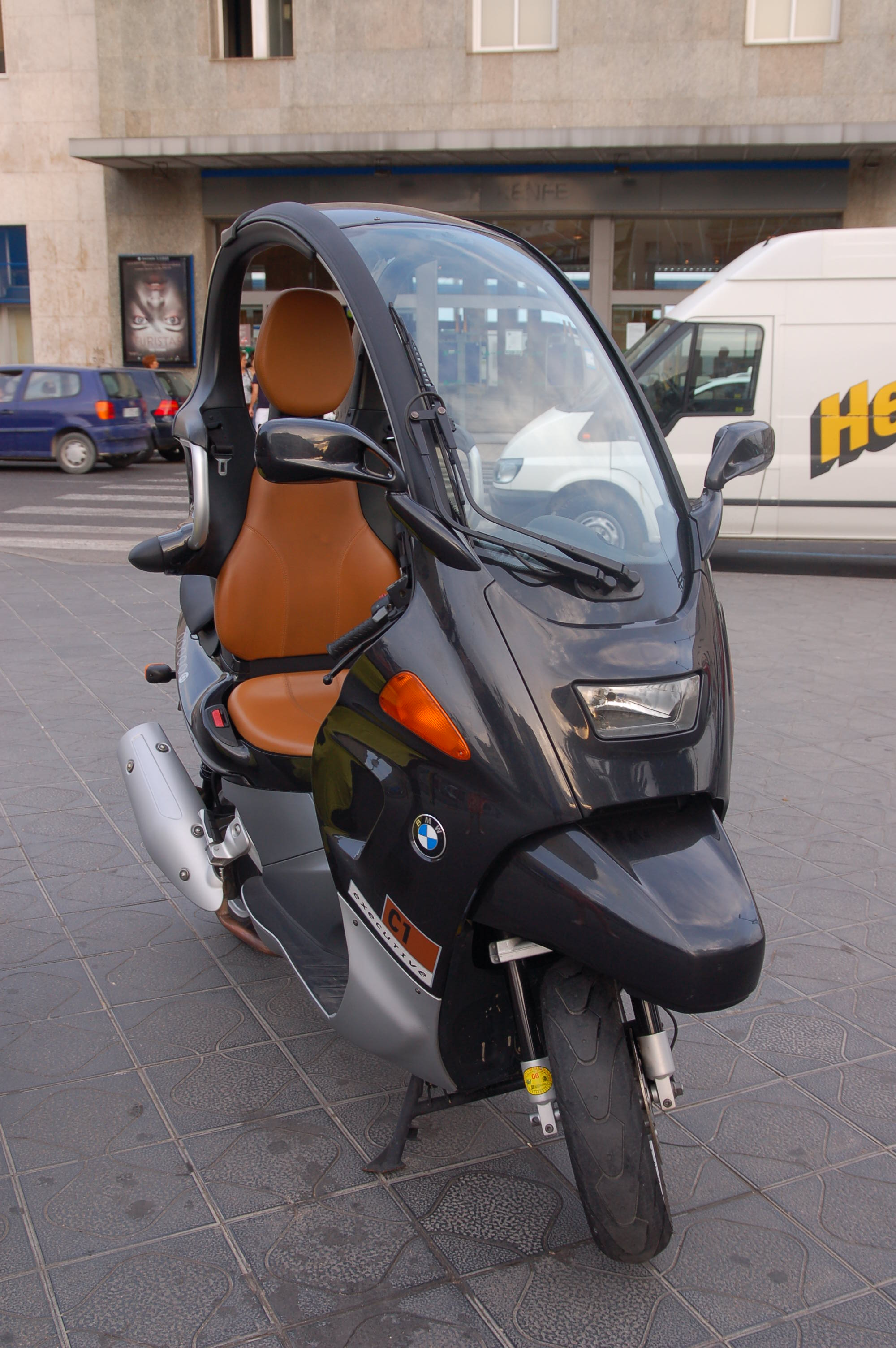
The BMW C1 has a structural enclosure

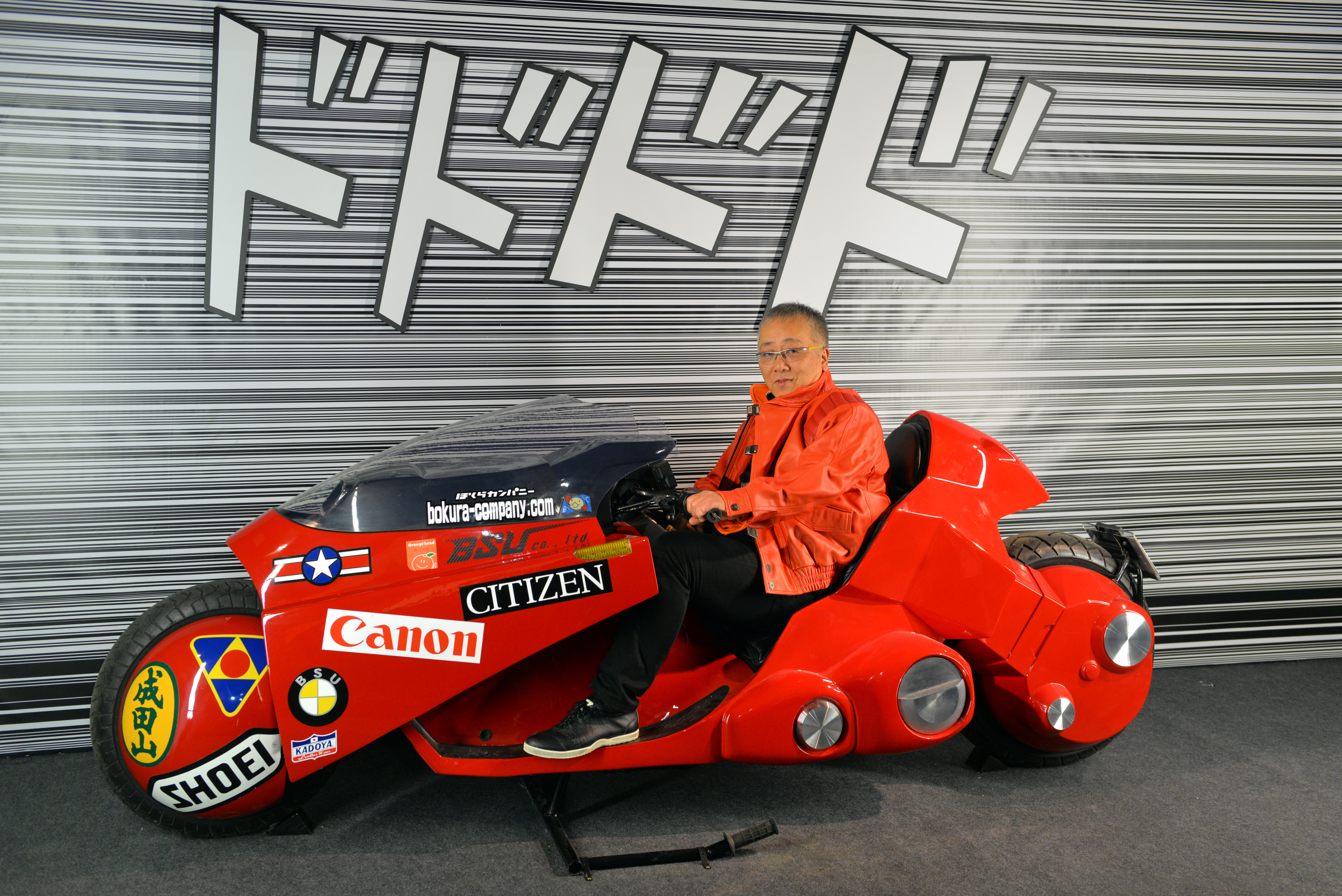
Replica of the fictional motorbike from the movie Akira

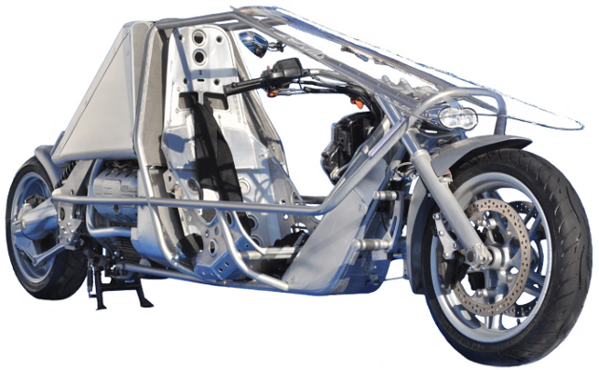
The Exodus feet-forwards motorcycle

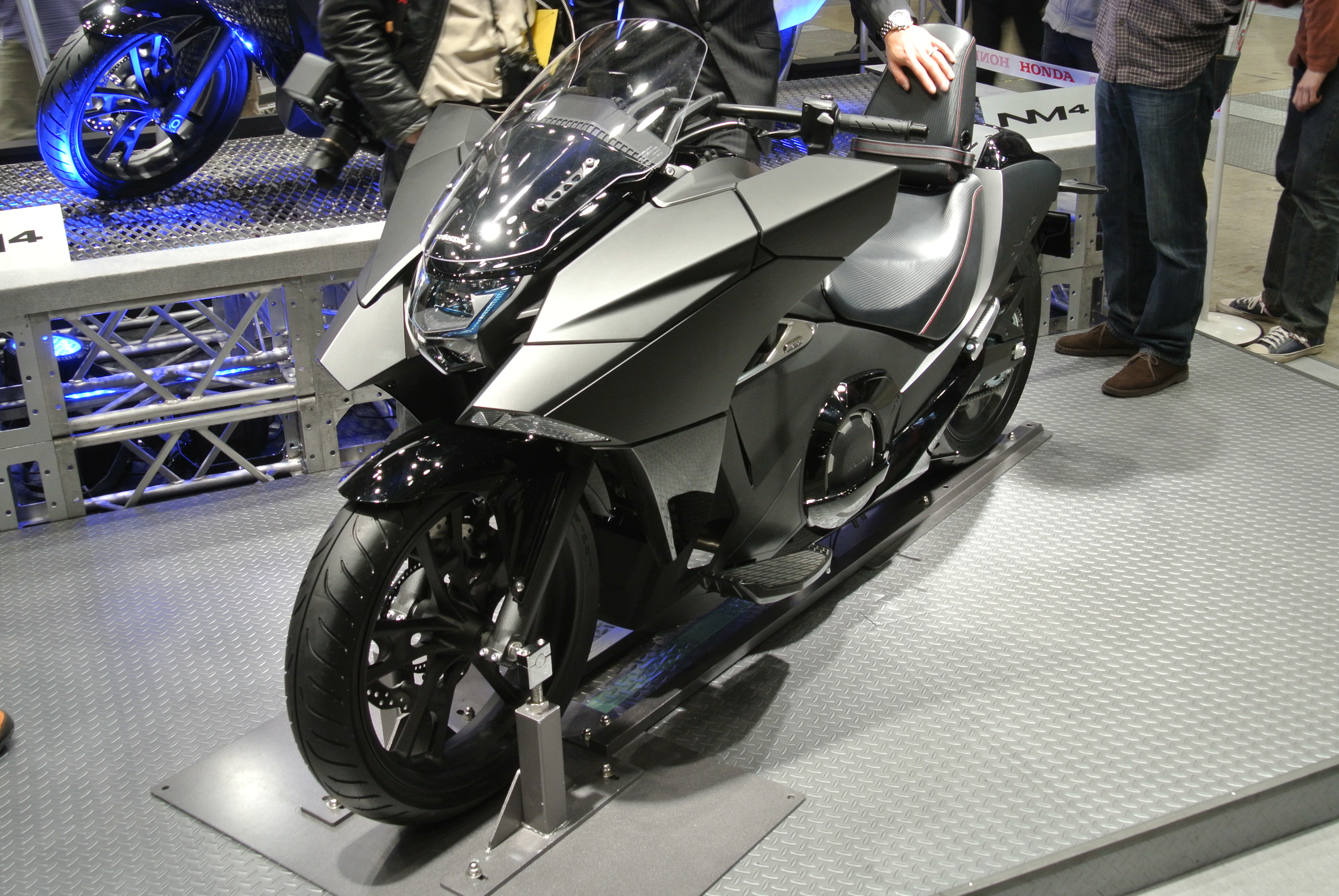
Concept Honda NM4

== Rationale ==
Modern motorcycles are simply well-developed motorized bicycles, and as such have drawbacks. Chief among these are:

- Safety – riders involved in an accident are at significantly higher risk of injury or death compared with car drivers.
- Weather – motorcycles do not offer the advantages of an enclosed car in poor weather.
- Convenience – conventional motorcycle riders need to wear a helmet and protective clothing.
- Efficiency – motorcycles have a relatively tall profile that reduces aerodynamic performance. "A feet-forward sitting position is easier to streamline" according to inventor Craig Vetter.
- Skill – motorcycles riders need training and practice to become skilled at riding.

Likewise, in dense urban environments, the car has a number of drawbacks:

- Road occupancy – a car takes up much more space than a single person, and most cars transport only one person. Similarly the area occupied when parked consumes considerable space.
- Environment – a car uses more fuel than a motorcycle for the same journey. It is also more expensive in terms of resources to build in the first place.
- Performance – Journey times – a car is generally a lot slower than a motorcycle for city journeys due to congestion. A greater percentage of weight redistribution to counter directional momentum is available.

The FF motorcycle is an attempt to marry the advantages of bikes and cars, while avoiding the drawbacks of either. However any FF STV has no roll stability so actual benefits are overstated by some proponents when comparing a FF motorcycle with a motorcar. In addressing these issues, most FF designs arrive at a low-slung faired body, with the rider in a reclining position.

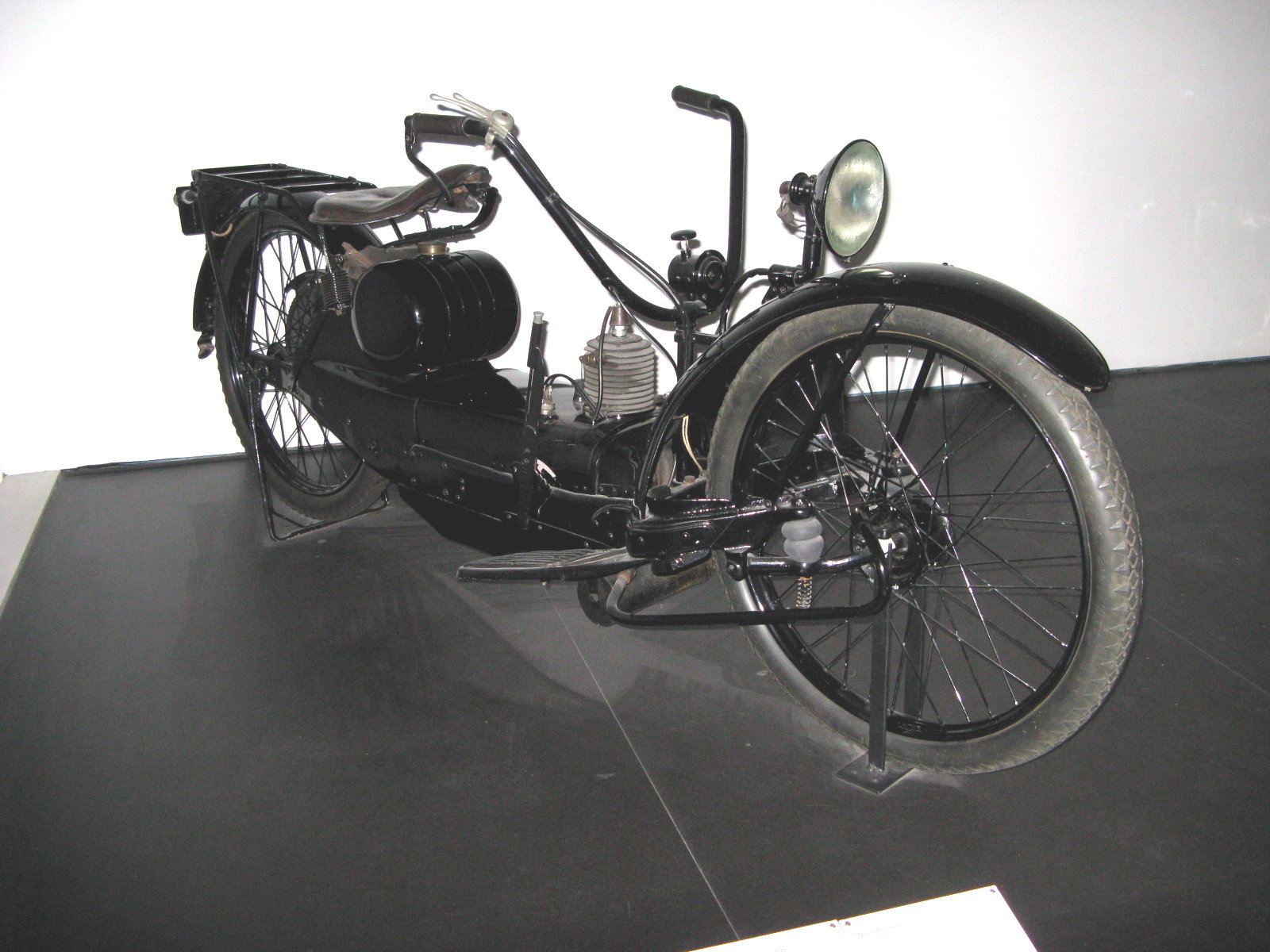
1924 Ner-A-Car

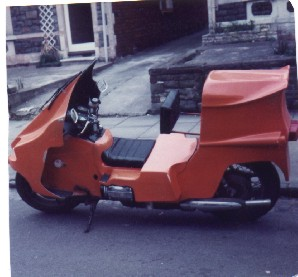
Newell-designed Gold Wing FF

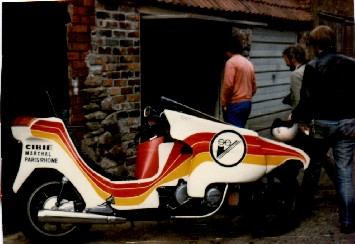
Newell-designed Kawasaki Z1300 FF

A number of FF concepts have been tried, but so far a commercially successful design has not appeared. There has been a revival of interest in the motor scooter as a means of personal transportation, and in some respects these vehicles have some features in common with FF motorcycles.

== Problems faced ==
The problems faced by the designer or marketer of an FF motorcycle are many. Some of these are perceptual. Experienced motorcyclists tend to be resistant to the idea, arguing that it's not a "proper" bike, and there is nothing wrong with the standard motorcycle. To car drivers, many of the disadvantages of the car are either not recognised or simply put up with and the overall convenience is hard to give up. Many car drivers would not consider a conventional motorcycle or scooter as an alternative, seeing it as a far less convenient and less safe option. To these people, an FF motorcycle needs to be seen (and hence marketed) as a two-wheeled car rather than an enclosed motorcycle. As the FF design moves the rider from an upright or Head First (HF) posture to a recumbent position (as in the Quasar and Dan Gurney's Alligator), the machine becomes lower and may make it harder to see in traffic. However, most FFs have seat which is no lower than the average car, and much higher than many sports cars. Those who ride them regularly say that the problems of having a seat at this height are largely in the minds of those who have never tried one.

There are some engineering issues too, which some designs can overcome. Designs such as the Quasar require the rider/driver to use one foot to stabilise the machine when stationary, by putting his foot out of the open side onto the road. This approach precludes the use of a fully enclosed body. The fully enclosed Peraves Ecomobiles and MonoTracers use stabiliser wheels deployed by the rider when the machine is travelling very slowly or stopped. Redesigning the motorcycle is necessary as a contributor in the autonomous vehicle arena and the FF design with the power plant moved to the back of the rider better distributes the weight and increases potential to lower the center of gravity.

== See also ==
- Lit Motors, a two-wheel, gyroscopically stabilized, enclosed cabin, electric vehicle with a steering wheel
- Motorized tricycle
