= Quasar (motorcycle) =

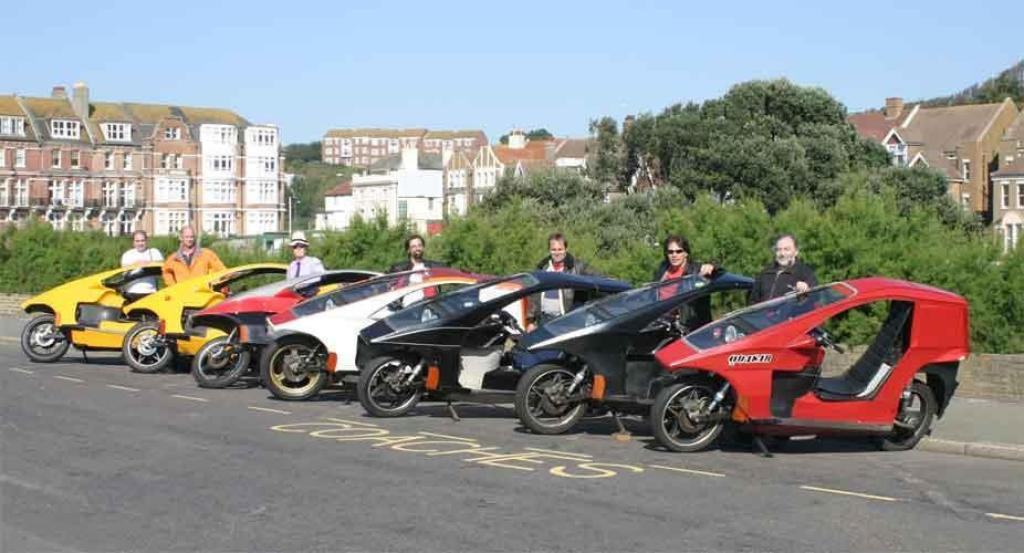

Overview
- Manufacturer: Malcolm Newell; Ken Leaman; John Malfoy
- Production: 1975-1982
- Assembly: United Kingdom
- Designer: Malcolm Newell, Ken Leaman

Body and chassis
- Class: Motorcycle
- Body style: Roofed Feet forward motorcycle
- Layout: FF

Powertrain
- Engine: Reliant 4 cylinder, water cooled, 850 cc
- Transmission: Reliant 4 speed (reverse removed)

Dimensions
- Wheelbase: 77 in (1.95 m)
- Length: 110 in (2.8 m)
- Width: 28 in (0.71m)
- Height: 54 in (1.37m)
- Kerb weight: 704 lb (320 kg)

Chronology
- Successor: Malcolm Newell's Phasars; Royce Creasey's Voyagers

The Quasar is a semi-enclosed feet forward motorcycle, created by Malcolm Newell and Ken Leaman, who made a number of similar vehicles. It repurposed an 850 cc four-cylinder inline engine used in the Reliant Robin three-wheeled light car and is capable of cruising at 90–100 mph (145–160 km/h) and exceeding 100 mph in favourable conditions.

== Design ==
In the Quasar, the rider sits feet forward or feet first, changing the usual position of the rider from on top and straddling the vehicle, to inside and sitting down. Unlike most motorcycles, the Quasar is a cabin motorcycle with a roof which goes over the rider. While normally not a problem, tall riders with larger, more modern helmets may have trouble fitting inside although it is also possible to carry a passenger with an intimate squeeze. In the front of the bike the laminated glass windscreen had car-style windscreen wipers and a heater. The use of a semi-enclosed 'cockpit' caused blind spots where the driver had to move his head around to make sure visibility was not obscured by the screen supports in corners. There is 60 litres (2.1 cu ft) of storage space behind the rider and wrap-around panniers were available as a factory option. Ingeniously, they are no wider than the narrow mirrors.

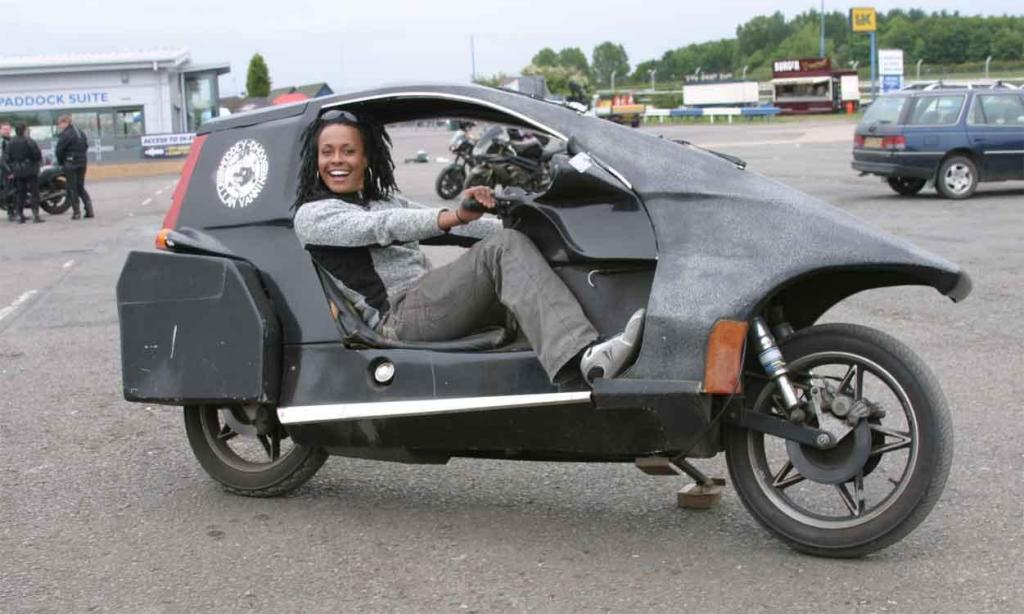
Broadcaster Jane Omorogbe in a Quasar

== History ==
After his previous idea for a trike named the "Revolution" failed, forcing him to close his motorcycle shop called "Chitty Chitty Bang Bang" in Devizes, Wiltshire, Malcolm Newell met Ken Leaman while on holiday in Scotland, and the two combined forces to design and build the first Quasar prototype. The first production Quasar was sold in December 1976, having been built by Ken and Malcolm at Wilson Brothers of Bristol, where Ken was employed full-time. Wilson kept the rights to the machine, although Ken did all the work on it in his own time.

Although they had launched a publicity campaign to gain interest in the bike, even after they began to receive enquiries Wilson Brothers did not provide enough funds for production to meet demand. Between December 1976 and October 1979, they only produced a total of seven vehicles. In 1980, John Malfoy, who had originally designed the Quasar's unique fluorescent rear light, persuaded his employers, Romarsh, of Calne, to manufacture five Quasars under licence from Wilson Brothers. All five vehicles were sold by December 1981, and a further batch of ten was prepared starting in August.

When Romarsh collapsed, John Malfoy bought the remaining parts and assembled several more machines, and Malcolm Newell independently made at least one more from parts. Only 21 Reliant engined Quasars were produced, but Newell went on to build several more in his own workshop at Field Cottage, in Heddington. These later Quasars were fitted with motorcycle engines and several also had a Bob Tait-designed hub centre steering system, as did some of Malcolm's Phasars. The later machines included several with Suzuki GS engines, both chain and shaft drive, a Honda VF750 powered machine and one with a Kawasaki Z1300 6-cylinder engine. Malcolm also produced a whole range of Phasar machines powered by engines from the Honda Goldwing and VT500, Moto Guzzi V50 and Convert, Z13, and Yamaha liquid-cooled 350s. He was working on a leaning trike, with two narrow leaning front wheels when he died in 1994, aged just 54.

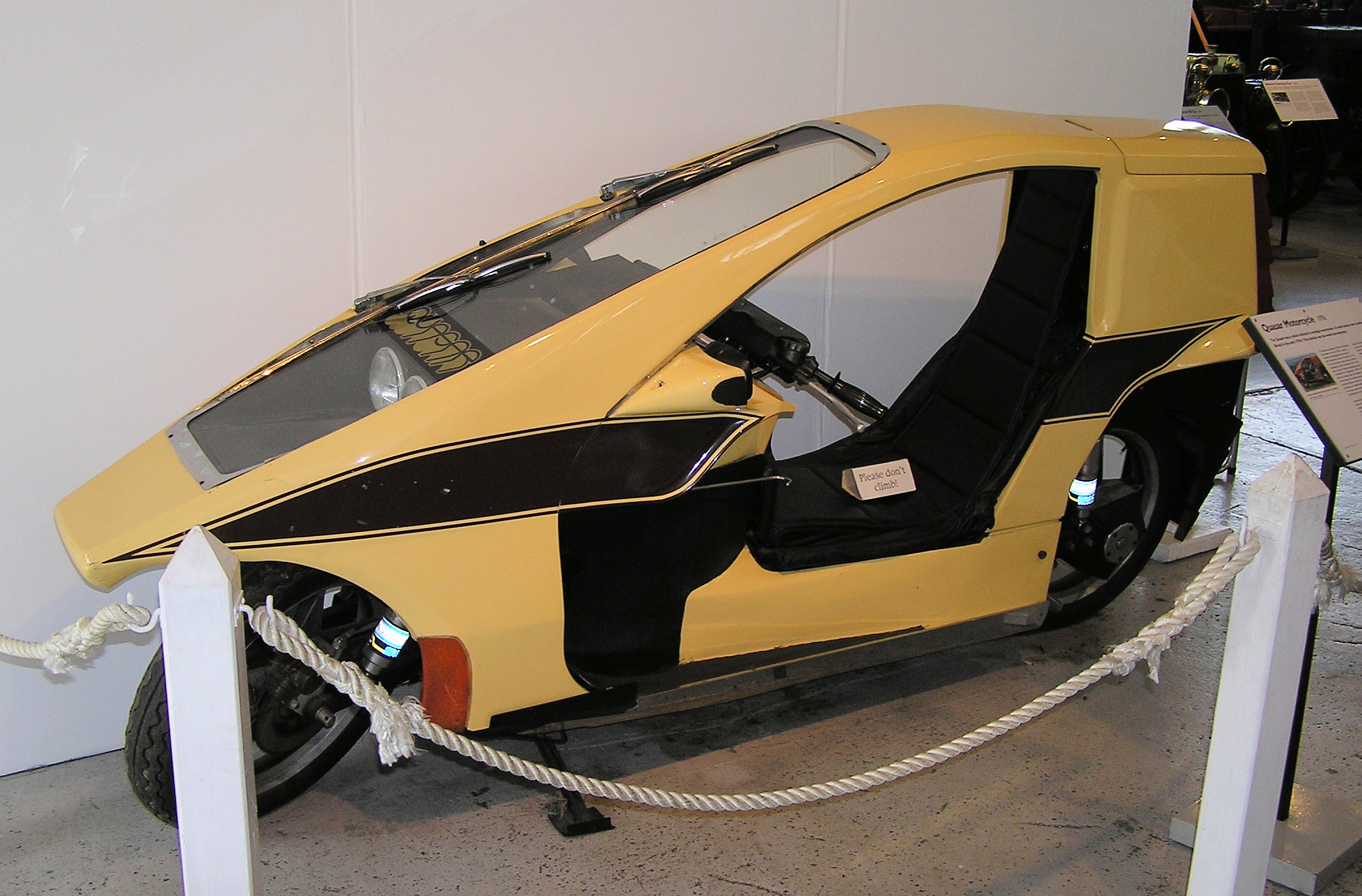
Quasar motorcycle TWS 632T, built in 1976, previously on display in Bristol, England

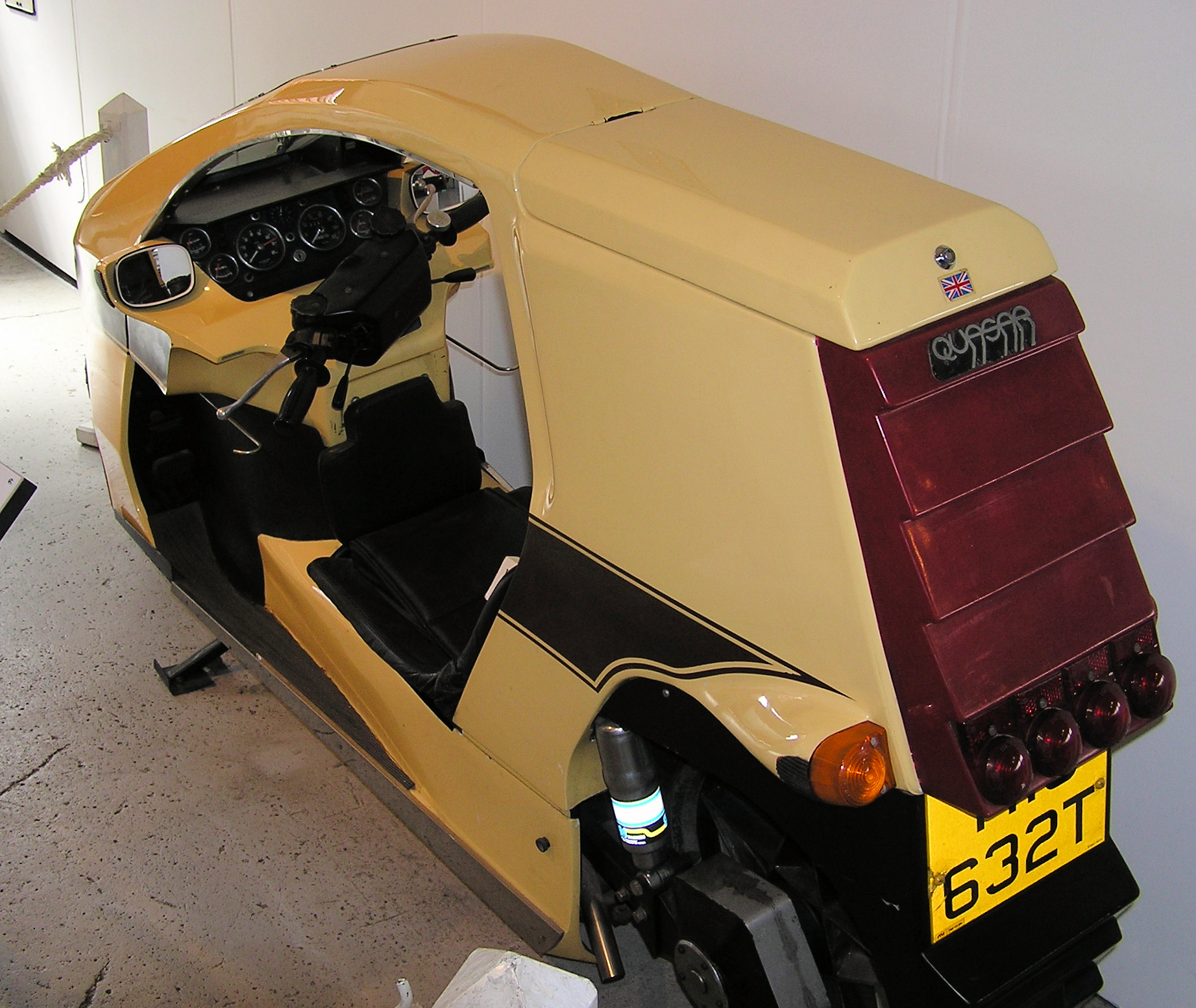
Rear view of Quasar motorcycle TWS 632T

Malcolm Newell and three Quasars were featured in a BBC TV motoring programme Top Gear which was broadcast on 14 April 1988. The same programme also featured the first public outing of Royce Creasey's prototype Voyager, which was a roofless development of the Quasar, and the Oekomobil/Ecomobile fully enclosed motorcycle made in Switzerland by Arnold Wagner's company, Peraves. The item was written and presented by bike journalist Paul Blezard who bought a Quasar of his own in 2005 and sold it in 2010 to buy Ian Pegram's Genesis, a kind of modern Quasar with the safety features of BMW's C1 roofed scooter. The original Quasar featured in the Top Gear programme was owned by enthusiast Mark Crowson, who embarked upon preserving and improving the Quasar heritage left by the late Malcolm Newell and the late John Malfoy. Crowson owns several Quasars and Phasars two of which are both lighter, faster and better handling than the originals and has also refurbished many others with help from his brother John Crowson. He and his white Quasar were featured on the cover of the July 2000 issue of Classic Bike, which had an eight-page feature on the machines by Paul Blezard and a couple of pages about Quasars from multiple world champion Phil Read, who picked up his MBE from Buckingham Palace after riding a Quasar there wearing top hat and tails.

== Legacy ==
Although the Quasar lacked funding to continue production and only 21 of the original design were ever made, with about 10 still on the road as of 2012, it is still well known in the feet forward motorcycle community. Riders of Quasars still gather at bike meetings.
