= BMW CE 04 =

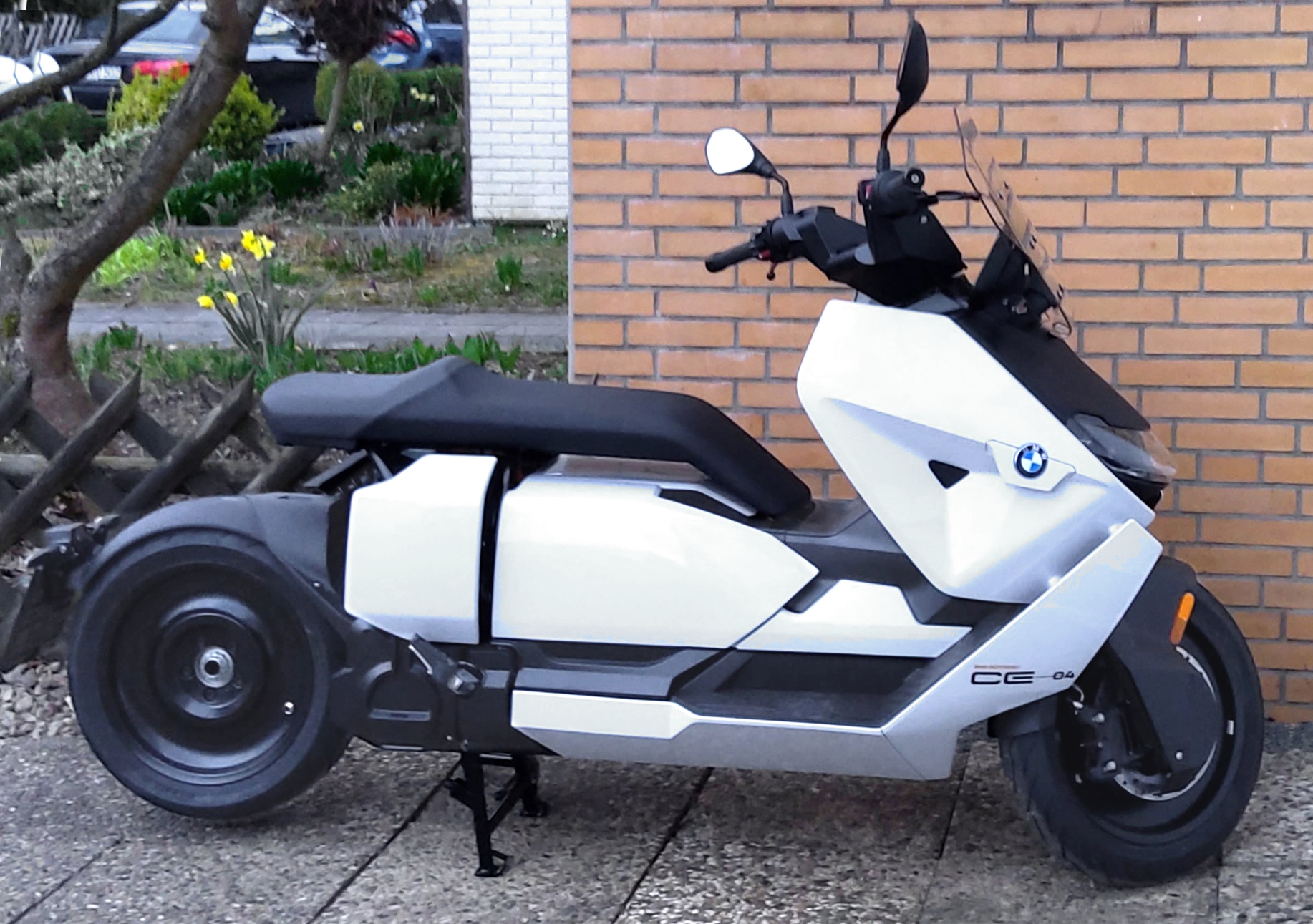
- Manufacturer: BMW Motorrad
- Parent company: BMW
- Production: 2022-present
- Predecessor: BMW C evolution
- Class: Electric scooter
- Engine: EMP156 synchronous electric motor, permanent magnet with liquid cooling
- Top speed: 75 mph (121 km/h)
- Power: 42 hp (31 kW) @ 4900
- Torque: 45.7 lb⋅ft (62.0 N⋅m) @ 1500
- Transmission: 1-speed
- Suspension: F: telescopic fork, 3.9 in (99 mm) travel R: suspension strut, 3.6 in (91 mm) travel
- Brakes: F: 4-piston fixed caliper, dual 265 mm (10.4 in) disks with ABS; R: 1-piston floating caliper, 265 mm (10.4 in) disc
- Tires: F: 120/70R-15; R: 160/60R-15
- Wheelbase: 66.0 in (1,680 mm)
- Dimensions: W: 33.7 in (860 mm) with mirrors H: 45.3 in (1,150 mm)
- Seat height: 30.7 in (780 mm)
- Weight: 509 lb (231 kg) (dry)
- Related: BMW CE 02

The BMW CE 04 is an electric scooter produced by BMW Motorrad.

== History ==
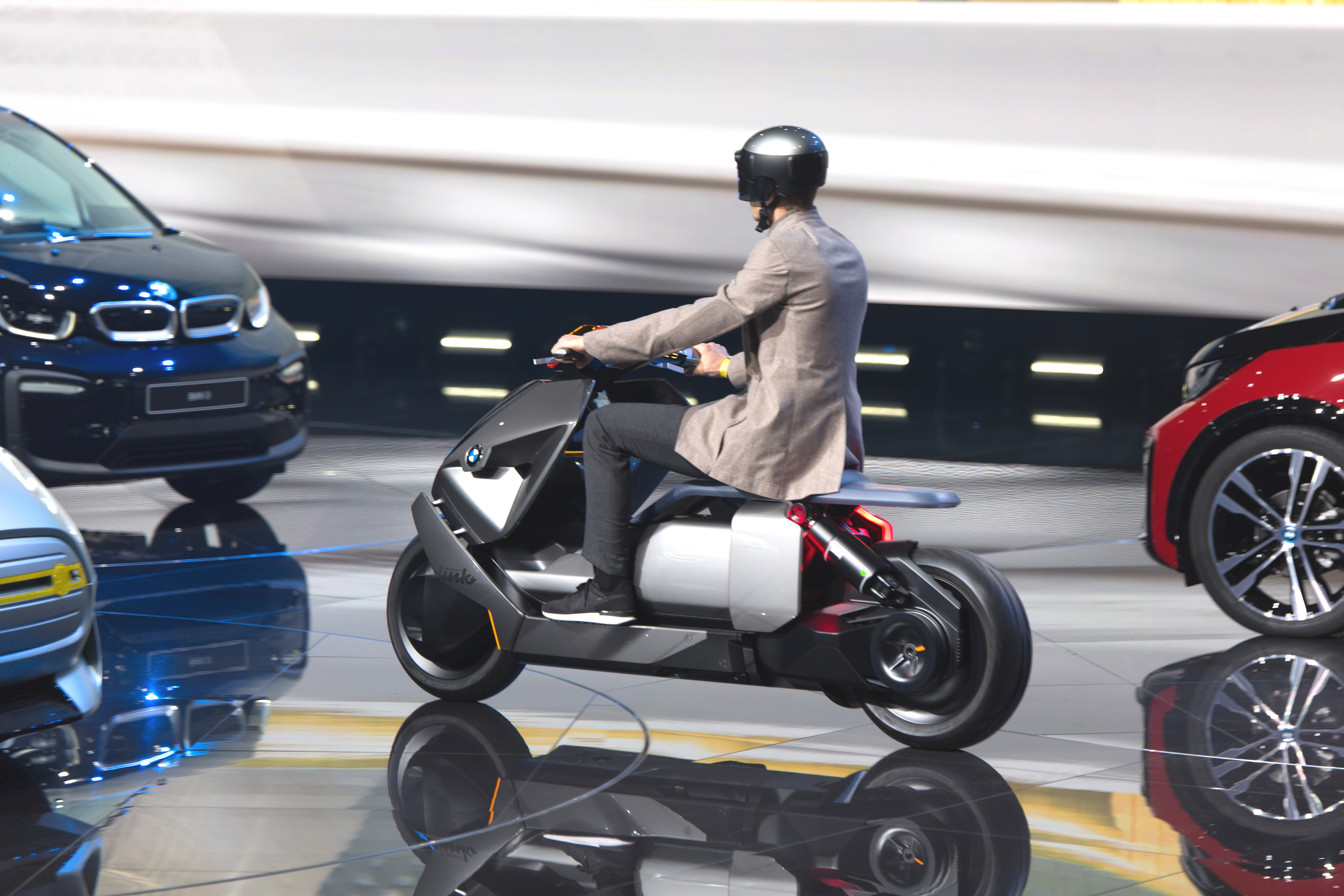
BMW Concept Link at Frankfurt 2017

The Concept Link design study gave an initial preview for the successor to the C evolution electric scooter as early as 2017, when it was shown at the Concorso d'Eleganza Villa d'Este in Lake Como, Italy. The Concept Link featured a touchscreen instrument panel and luggage compartment beneath the rider's seat, using space made available through an electric traction motor; the "Link" name referred to internet connectivity features, including the ability to plot routes and select music based on the rider's appointment calendar. As an accessory, a jacket wirelessly linked to the scooter allowed the rider to manipulate controls by making specific gestures.

An updated concept named Definition CE 04 was shown in November 2020 at BMW's "Next/Gen 2020" virtual show; at the time, BMW hinted a closely related production model would follow. The Definition concept included a large screen in the instrument panel, connected to the user's smartphone; the matching riding jacket was illuminated for visibility and contained a pocket that would charge the phone wirelessly. By March 2021, leaked patent images indicated that BMW had completed the design for a production version of the CE 04 with very few changes from the earlier Concept Link and Definition concepts.

In July 2021, BMW officially presented the final production version of the CE 04, which is scheduled to go on sale in February 2022. The "04" in the name refers to the market segment (400 cc gasoline-powered scooters) at which it is intended. The suggested retail price is US$11,795 (equivalent to $12,674 in 2024) in the United States and £11,700 in the United Kingdom. At Milipol 2021 in November, BMW showed a CE 04 equipped with a police package, which adds typical emergency vehicle equipment including LED strobe lights, siren, additional secured storage, and extra radio.

== Design ==
=== Styling ===
The CE 04 implements the styling from the Concept Link in production form with changes to make it road-legal, including mirrors and license plate mounts; The Verge noted the Concept Link looked like "[it would] be right at home in a sci-fi movie like Blade Runner" in 2017 and called the follow-up Definition CE 04 concept of November 2020 "straight out of a William Gibson novel. The elongated, low vehicle body and the diagonally rising front end create a clean break from the look of scooters as we know them." Deliberate rear panel gaps were left to provide a hint of the mechanics of the scooter.

=== Powertrain and battery ===
The powertrain of the CE 04 is derived from BMW automobiles. The traction motor is a shortened version of the electric motor used in the X3 xDrive 30e and 225xe plug-in hybrid models, generating a peak of 42 hp (31 kW) (20 hp (15 kW) continuous) and 46 lb⋅ft (62 N⋅m) of torque. The scooter can accelerate from 0–30 mph (0–48 km/h) in 2.6 seconds. The maximum speed is 75 mph (121 km/h).

A derating version is available, for driving license reasons and their specifications are reduced to 31 hp (23 kW) (15 hp (11 kW) continuous).

The electric traction motor is mounted to the chassis, not the swingarm, reducing unsprung weight. A toothed belt drive is used to transmit power from the motor to the rear wheel. Three driving modes are available (eco, rain, and road), controlling the amount of throttle response and regenerative braking; an optional driving mode (dynamic) provides the most aggressive throttle response and strongest regeneration.

The scooter is equipped with a 147.6 V, 60.6 Ah / 8.9 kWh (8.5 usable) lithium-ion storage battery originally designed for the iX and i4. The battery is attached to a cooling plate with fins, allowing heat to dissipate through the air. Estimated range is 80 mi (130 km) and 62 mi (100 km) for the derating version, using the WLTP cycle. It is capable of AC charging at up to 6.9 kW; it is not equipped with DC fast charging. Charging times (for battery state from 0% to 100%) are estimated to range from 4 hours, 20 minutes (using a 2.3 kW / Level 1 AC supply) to 1 hour, 40 minutes (6.9 kW / Level 2). On Level 2 charging, it takes 45 minutes to bring the battery from 20% to 80% state of charge.

The CE 04 is fitted with mechanical brakes made by the Spanish brand JJuan; the front fork has twin 265 mm-diameter (10.4 in) discs with 4-piston fixed calipers, while the rear wheel is equipped with a single 265 mm (10.4 in) disc and single-piston floating caliper. A two-channel anti-lock braking system from Bosch is fitted; as an option, the ABS Pro system includes a tilt sensor, regulating braking during cornering.

=== Features ===
The instrument panel features a 10.25 in (260 mm) TFT color screen with integrated navigation and connectivity with the rider's smartphone through a Bluetooth and a Wi-Fi connection. Additionally, it features a ventilated smartphone storage compartment with a USB-C charging port. LED lights are standard. Traction control is available as an option. An adaptive headlight is optional, which provides additional light depending on lean angle.

A reversing aid is provided, controlled by a handlebar-mounted switch on the left side. When activated, the vehicle reverses at a walking pace.
