= BMW CE 02 =

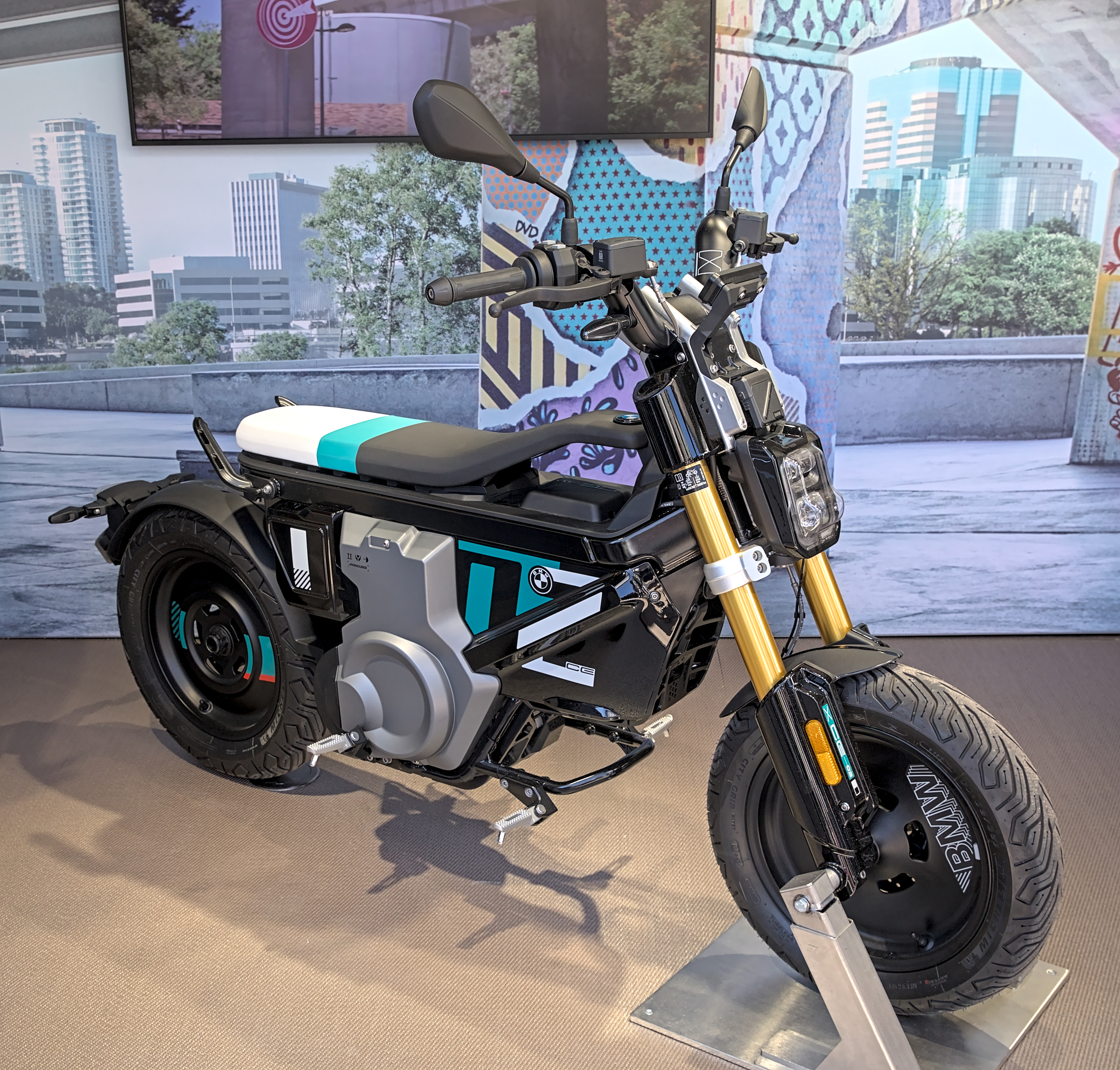
- Manufacturer: BMW Motorrad
- Parent company: BMW
- Production: 2023-present
- Class: Electric scooter
- Engine: externally excited synchronous electric motor, air cooled
- Top speed: 59 mph (95 km/h)
- Power: 15 hp (11 kW) @ 5000
- Torque: 40.5 lb⋅ft (54.9 N⋅m) @ 1000
- Transmission: 1-speed, belt drive
- Suspension: F: upside-down telescopic fork, 4.6 in (120 mm) travel R: 2.2 in (56 mm) travel
- Brakes: F: 2-piston floating caliper, 239 mm (9.4 in) disc with ABS; R: 1-piston floating caliper, 220 mm (8.7 in) disc
- Tires: F: 120/80R-14; R: 150/70R-15
- Wheelbase: 53.2 in (1,350 mm)
- Dimensions: W: 34.5 in (880 mm) with mirrors H: 44.9 in (1,140 mm)
- Seat height: 29.5 in (750 mm)
- Weight: 291 lb (132 kg) (dry)
- Related: BMW CE 04

The BMW CE 02 is an electric scooter produced by BMW Motorrad, which markets it as an e-Parkourer for city use.

== History ==
BMW filed in September 2020 for trademarks for the CE 04, realized as a maxi-scooter, and the CE 02, a mini-motorcycle. The CE 02 concept was released one year later in 2021, targeting the same market as the Honda Monkey and Grom. Alexander Buckan, BMW Motorrad's head of vehicle design, described the concept as "[embodying] youthful freedom and a carefree spirit — rather like a skateboard on two wheels".

The production CE 02 was shown in July 2023. In the United States, it will be available starting with the 2024 model year with a suggested retail price of $7,599. The "Highline" package adds $875.

== Design ==
=== Styling ===
Like a scooter, the CE 02 uses hand controls exclusively; however, the rider straddles the vehicle and rests their feet on footpegs like a motorcycle. Compared to the concept version, the production model adds practical features, including mirrors, a guard for the belt drive, and a front fender. The Highline version can be distinguished by the gold-colored front fork.

=== Powertrain and battery ===
The CE 02 uses an externally-excited, air-cooled synchronous motor. There are two versions available, one with 5 hp (3.7 kW) output and another with 15 hp (11 kW) output. The lower-output version is intended for young riders with a Class AM driving licence for mopeds in European markets, and is limited to 28 mph (45 km/h), while the higher-output version has a top speed of 59 mph (95 km/h).

There are two slots for removable, air-cooled lithium-ion batteries, each 48 V with a capacity of 1.96 kW-hr. The bundled external charger will recharge at a rate of 900 W; an optional Highline package includes an upgraded charger with 1.5 kW maximum rate. The low-output CE 02 uses a single battery and has an estimated range of 28 mi (45 km), charging from 20% to 80% state of charge in 85 minutes. The high-output version has an estimated range of 55 mi (89 km) and charges from 20% to 80% in 168 min., dropping to 102 min. with the 1.5 kW charger.

The electric traction motor is mounted to the chassis, not the swingarm, reducing unsprung weight. A toothed belt drive is used to transmit power from the motor to the rear wheel. There are two driving modes: Flow, which offers maximum regenerative braking, and Surf, which offers a sharper throttle response. The Highline package adds a third driving mode, Flash, which offers the sportiest feel. There is a power-saving mode which limits output to 4 kW (5.4 hp) to maximize range.

=== Features ===
The CE 02 is equipped with a 3.5 in (89 mm) TFT display and a USB-C port for charging personal electronic devices. A Bluetooth interface can be added as part of the Highline package, allowing riders to use their smartphone as a navigation display.
