= BMW C1 =

Enclosed scooter made by BMW, 2000–2002

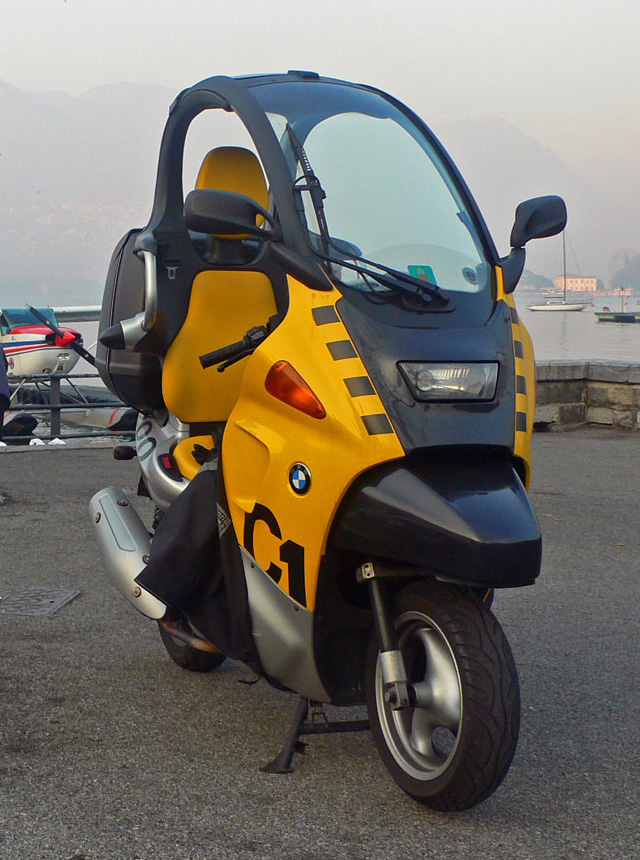
- BMW C1 "Family's Friend" model
- Manufacturer: Bertone
- Parent company: BMW
- Production: 2000–2002
- Successor: BMW C evolution
- Class: Scooter
- Engine: 124.9 or 176.3 cc (7.62 or 10.76 cu in) four-stroke single, 4V/cyl
- Bore / stroke: 125: 56.4 mm × 50.0 mm (2.22 in × 1.97 in); 200: 62.0 mm × 58.4 mm (2.44 in × 2.30 in)
- Compression ratio: 125: 13.0:1; 200: 11.5:1
- Power: 125: 15 hp (11 kW)@9250; 200: 18 hp (13 kW)@9000
- Torque: 125: 12 N⋅m (8.9 lbf⋅ft)@6500 200: 17 N⋅m (13 lbf⋅ft)@6500
- Transmission: CVT, 3.0–0.9:1
- Frame type: Aluminum space frame
- Suspension: F: Telelever fork R: Swing arm
- Brakes: F/R: disc, 220 mm (8.7 in) dia.
- Tires: F: 120/70R13; R: 140/70R12
- Wheelbase: 1,488 mm (58.6 in)
- Dimensions: L: 2,075 mm (81.7 in); W: 1,026 mm (40.4 in) with mirrors H: 1,766 mm (69.5 in)
- Weight: 185 kg (408 lb) (dry)
- Fuel capacity: 9.7 L (2.1 imp gal; 2.6 US gal)

The BMW C1 is an enclosed scooter made by Bertone for BMW. Compared to a conventional scooter, the C1 offered extra safety features and protection from the elements. The rider would sit in a car-type seat (with a four-point seat-belt) and adopt a feet-forward posture. Introduced in 2000, it was available throughout Europe, but sales were disappointing and the C1 was discontinued in 2002. In 2009 the C1-E electric version was presented as a concept.

== Models ==
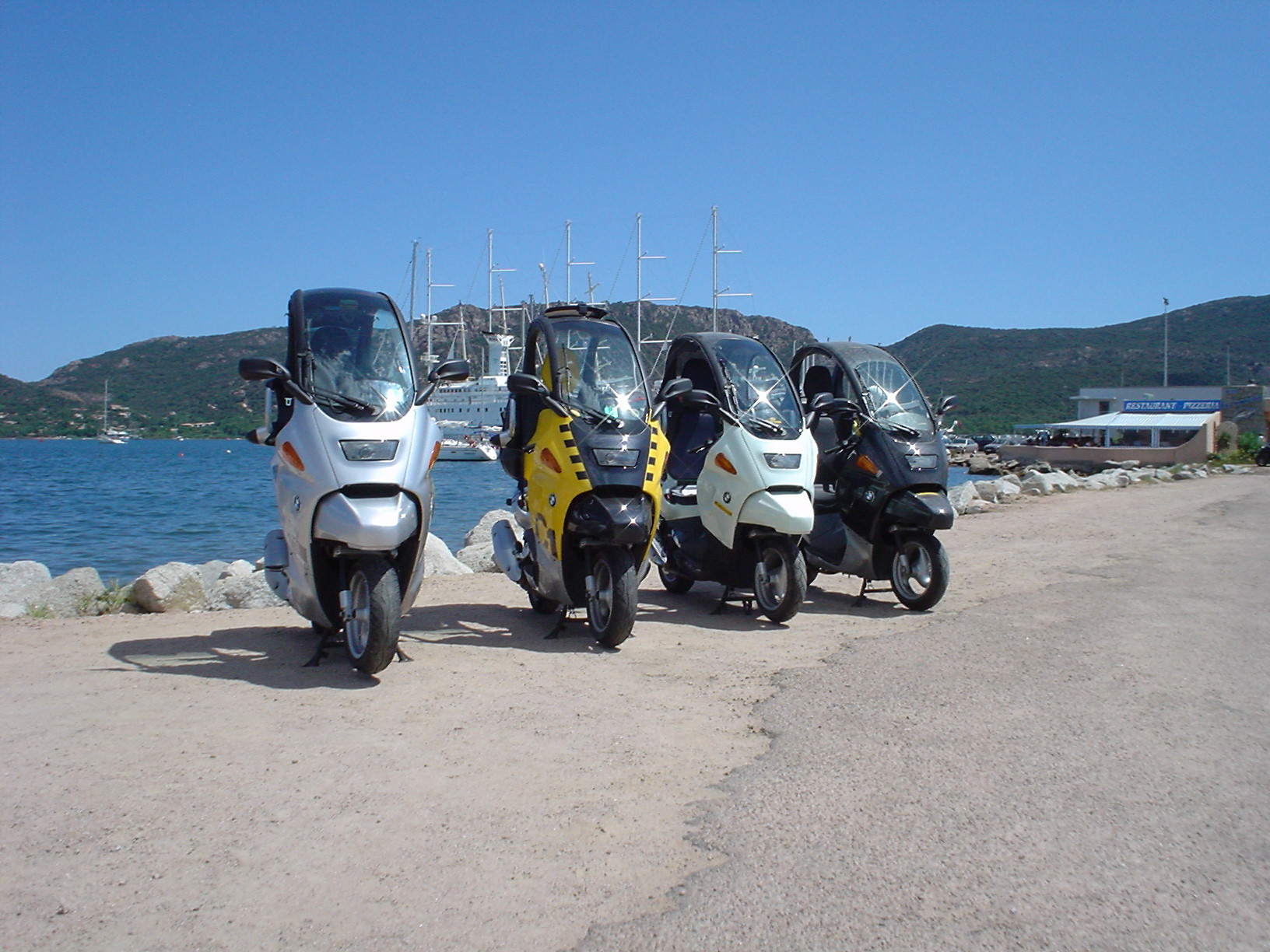
From left to right: C1 200 "Executive", C1 200 "Family's Friend", C1 125 base, C1 125 "Executive"

The C1 was originally available from May 2000 with a 125 model designation; in 2001, a 200 model was added. The "125" has a 125 cc capacity four valve, four-stroke, water-cooled, fuel injected engine producing 15 brake horsepower (11 kW) at 9250 RPM; the "200" has a larger 176 cubic centimetres (10.7 cu in) engine producing 18 brake horsepower (13 kW) at 9000 RPM. Torque output is similarly improved, from 12 to 17 N⋅m (8.9 to 12.5 lbf⋅ft) for the 125 and 200, respectively. Both engines were manufactured by Rotax and include a CVT gearbox. Both models of the C1 weighed approximately 185 kilograms (408 lb) with a 40/60 front/rear weight distribution.

The C1 is arguably underpowered: an MCN review of the 125 model said, "The BMW C1's 125cc engine is an unremarkable four-stroke single producing a respectable 15bhp. But it’s a heavy motorcycle at 185kg – all the 1000cc sports bikes weigh less".

The tires are 120/70R13 in front and 140/70R12 in the rear; both the front and rear brakes are single-disc, each 220 mm (8.7 in) in diameter. The C1's aluminum space frame was suspended using a Telelever fork with a single, central spring strut and swing-arm rear unit carrying the engine and transmission, using two spring struts.

The space behind the rider and outside the "cage" has one of three interchangeable uses: a large, lockable external storage box; a luggage rack; or a pillion seat. There were four trim lines: Base, Family's Friend, Executive, and Williams.

BMW C1 Variations
Trim	Image	Model (Note: Designates 125cc ("125") or 176cc ("200") engine)		Notes
Trim	Image	125	200	Notes
Base		Yes	Yes	
Family's Friend	A picture from the side through the cockpit areas of several BMW C1 scooters which are parked side by side in perfect alignment	Yes	Yes	Includes base model features, adds extra luggage attachment kit and storage compartment in the front fairing
Executive		Yes	Yes	Family's Friend model features plus reading light and mobile phone holder
Williams		No	Yes	Executive model features plus special paint

== Performance ==
0–50 km/h (31 mph) on the C1 125 is 5.9 seconds and the C1 200 is 3.9 seconds. Fuel consumption for the C1 125 at a constant 90 km/h (56 mph) is 2.9 L/100 km (97 mpg_{‑imp}; 81 mpg_{‑US}) and on the C1 200 is 3.2 L/100 km (88 mpg_{‑imp}; 74 mpg_{‑US}). Top speed of the C1 125 is 103 km/h (64 mph) and of the C1 200 is 112 km/h (70 mph).

== History ==
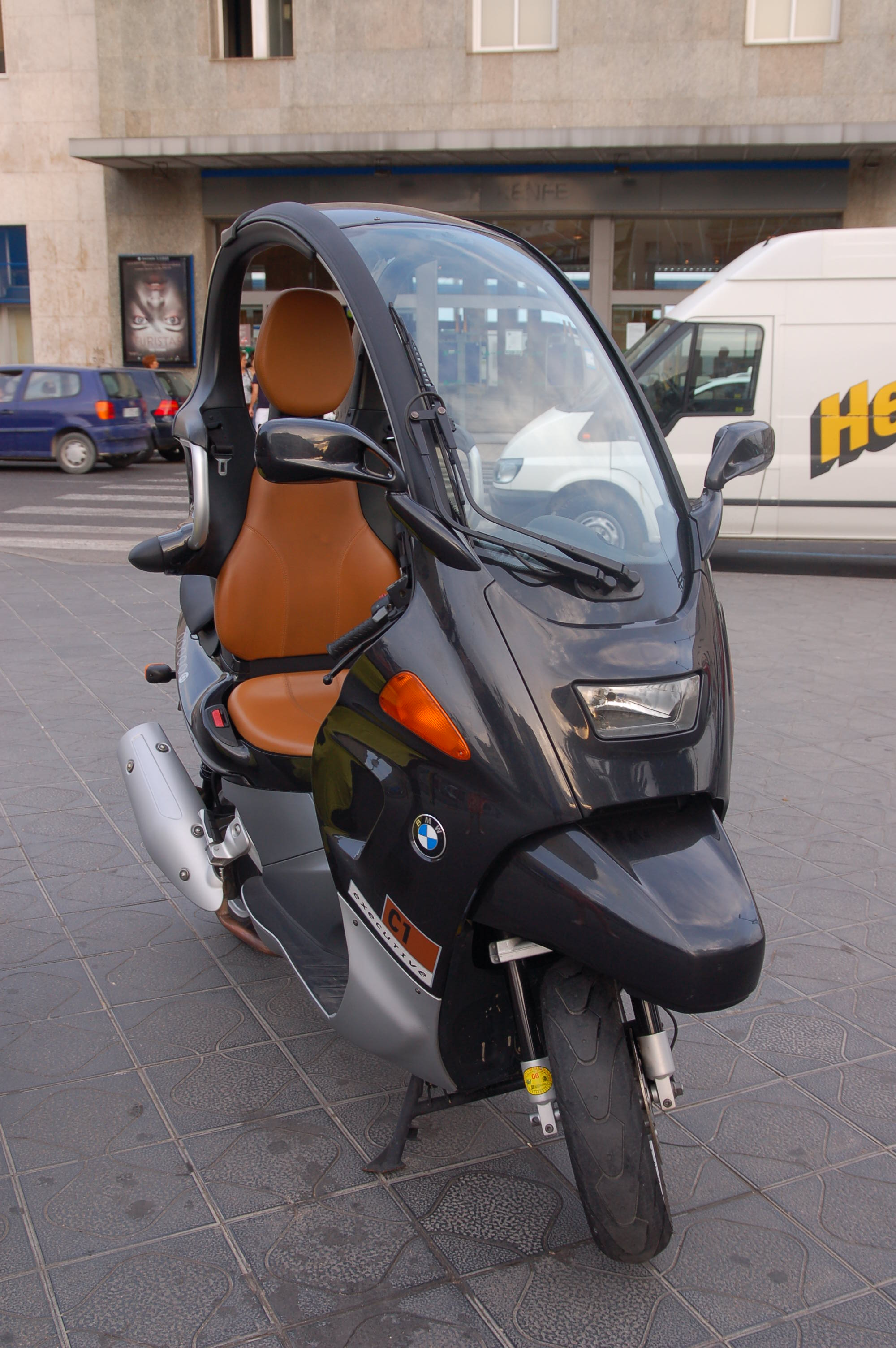
Black BMW C1 Executive scooter parked on a pedestrian area in a city street

BMW's intention with the C1 was to appeal to car drivers in crowded city streets. The idea was to offer the convenience of a scooter or motorbike but without many of the associated dangers or hassles. The C1's most innovative design feature was its emphasis on safety. However, being secured by a seat belt could make slow speed handling and maneuvering rather tricky until experience is acquired.

BMW added passive safety and car-like crash testing to the scooter. It claimed that in a head-on collision, the C1 offered a standard of accident protection comparable to a European compact car. That was the prime marketing strategy to convert car buyers; the C1 was claimed to be so safe that the rider did not need to wear a helmet to ride it. This was achieved by using two shoulder-height roll bars, a crumple zone around the front wheel and an aluminium roll cage creating a car-like safety cell. It also had twin seatbelts reminiscent of an aviation style four-point harness to keep the rider in place.

Many countries deemed the use of seatbelts in conjunction with wearing a helmet to be unsafe. The added strain on the rider's neck from the added weight of the helmet could cause significant injury to the restrained rider even in a low speed head-on collision. Germany, Switzerland, Italy, France, Israel and Spain authorities were quick to allow an exception to the helmet law for the C1. However, poor C1 sales in the United Kingdom may in part be attributable to the British government's refusal of BMW's request to change helmet regulations for C1 riders. Another country that requires C1 riders to wear a helmet is Sweden, although wearing the seat-belts is voluntary. However both seat belts must be secured for the vehicle to move.

It is a shame that the UK government is slow to foresee change when other countries have grasped the idea of a convenient, environmentally sound and safe solution to urban personal transport. With pressure for manufacturers to develop innovative transport solutions which benefit the environment I hope that legislators will become more receptive to our approach.

— Kevin Gaskell, Managing Director of BMW (GB)

After selling 10,614 units in 2001, BMW only sold 2,000 units in 2002, and ceased production of the C1 in October 2002. The United Kingdom accounted for approximately 1/4 of total sales. It was never made available in the United States.

== Factory options ==
BMW-supplied accessory options included:

- Anti-lock brakes (ABS)
- 'Fun Audio System' (music system, volume linked to speed)
- Interior reading light
- BMW Immobilizer alarm system
- Lockable glove box with power socket
- Sunroof (as opposed to the standard 'hard top')
- Heated grips and/or seat
- Headlights tilt angle adjustment (for different payloads)
- Windscreen wiper with washer fluid

== Later development ==
In 2009 BMW used the same layout for the C1-E, an electric scooter concept vehicle that it developed as part of the European safety project ("European Safer Urban Motorcycling" - eSUM). The C1-E uses components supplied by electric scooter manufacturer Vectrix and is powered by a lithium-ion battery.

The BMW C evolution introduced in 2014 was a similar maxi-scooter aimed at the same market segment, powered by an electric traction motor. Patent drawings for an updated BMW scooter were revealed in 2020, which used the chassis of the C evolution; equipped with a removable safety cell, the electric scooter concept was similar to the original C1.

== See also ==
- Benelli Adiva
- Cabin motorcycle
