= BMW C evolution =

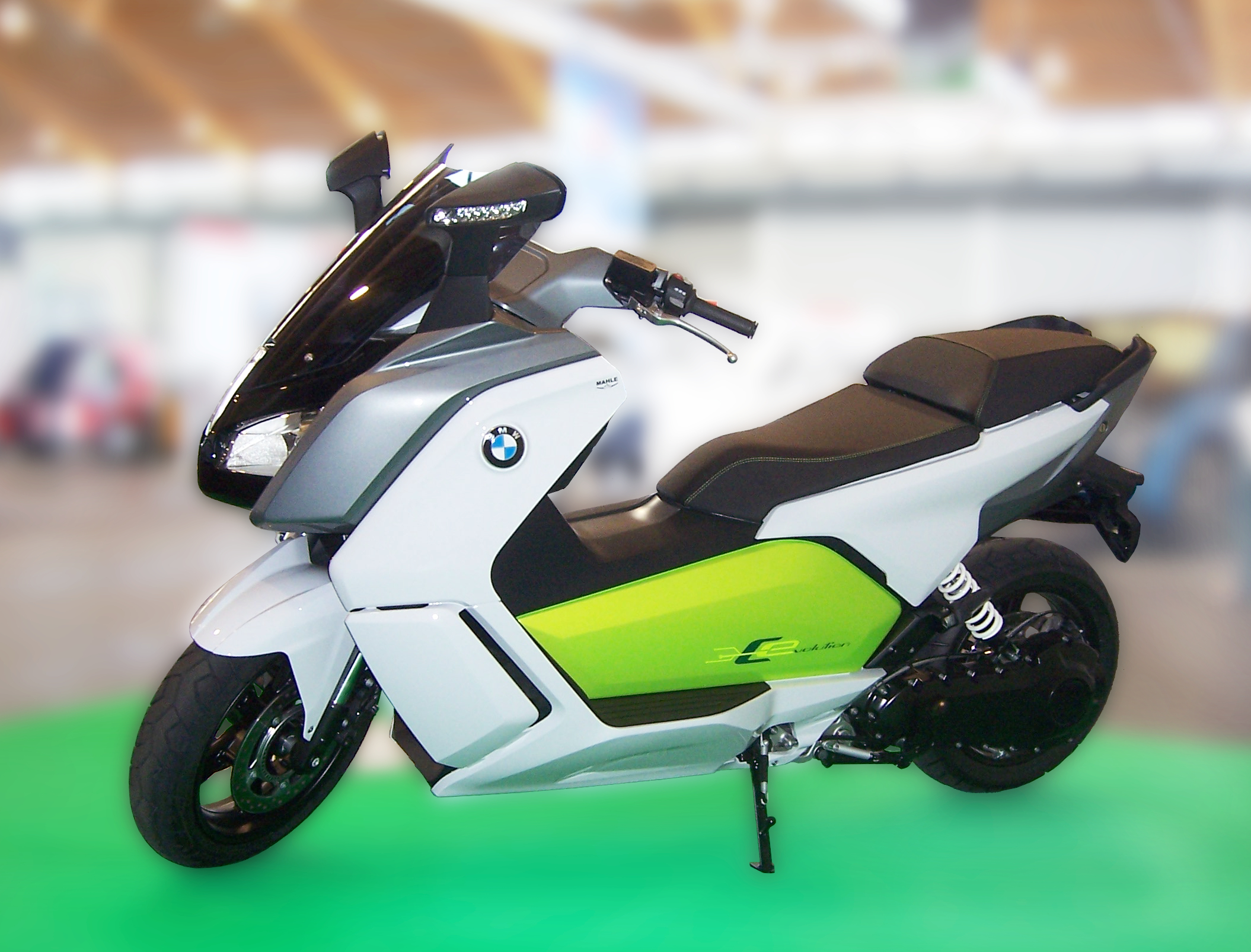
- Manufacturer: BMW Motorrad
- Parent company: BMW
- Production: 2014-2021
- Predecessor: BMW C1
- Successor: BMW CE 04
- Class: Electric scooter

The BMW C evolution is an electric scooter produced by BMW Motorrad.

== History ==
The first stage of development was the BMW E-Scooter concept vehicle in 2011. A little later, the corresponding design study BMW Concept e was created as the second stage.

As the third stage of development, the C evolution was a largely near-series prototype, of which a small series was first produced in 2012. BMW made five of these prototypes available to the press during the 2012 Summer Olympics in London.

In September 2013, BMW announced series production for spring 2014. In April 2014, production began with ten scooters a day.

At the 2016 Paris Motor Show, BMW presented the C Evolution Long Range, a version of the scooter with new battery cells with 94 Ah instead of the previous 60. This increased the specified range to up to 160 km. In addition, the continuous output of the motor was increased to 19 kW. In July 2021, BMW presented a successor model, the BMW CE 04, with some versions modified for police use.

== Design ==
The C evolution shares the technology of the battery with the BMW i3. The batteries are exclusively air-cooled.

The almost noiseless scooter has four driving modes: "Road", "Dynamic", "Sail" and "Eco Pro". In "Eco Pro" mode, the acceleration is noticeably reduced, but the range increases to approx. 120 km. In "Road" mode, full acceleration and 50% of maximum regenerative braking are available, in "Dynamic" full acceleration and maximum recuperation and in "Sail" full acceleration and no recuperation. The scooter then rolls out without the engine brake.
