= Ner-A-Car =

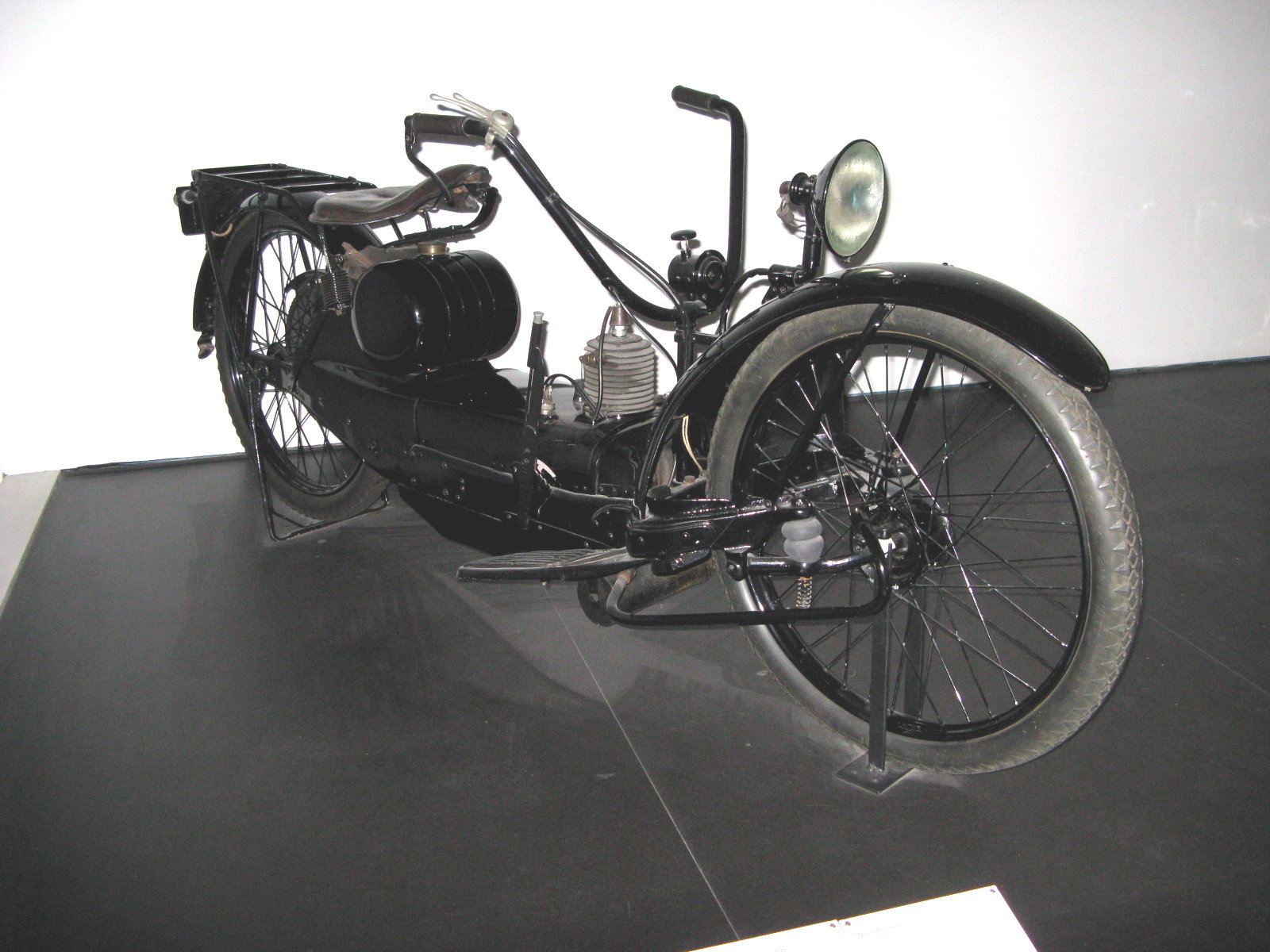
- Manufacturer: Ner-A-Car Corporation (United States); Sheffield-Simplex (United Kingdom)
- Also called: Neracar
- Production: 1921–1927
- Assembly: Syracuse, New York, USA; Kingston-on-Thames, UK
- Class: Feet Forward
- Top speed: 35 mph
- Power: 2.5 hp
- Transmission: 5-position friction drive CVT, 3-speed manual
- Frame type: Pressed steel perimeter frame
- Suspension: Front: Double leading arms with hub-center steering Rear: none, except for 1926 de-luxe model with swingarm and quarter-elliptic leaf springs
- Brakes: Drum, operated by pedal located on left foot board.
- Tires: 26 x 3-inch non-skid
- Wheelbase: 59 in (1,500 mm) (standard); 68.5 in (1,740 mm) (with rear suspension)
- Dimensions: L: 84 in (2,100 mm)
- Weight: 175 pounds (dry)
- Turning radius: 19 ft 6 in (5,940 mm) turning circle

U.S. Ner-A-Car logo

The Ner-A-Car was a type of feet forwards motorcycle designed by Carl Neracher in 1918. It used an unusual steel-channel chassis, much like an automobile, and hub-center steering at the front wheel, making it 'nearly a car' in design. The Ner-A-Car was the most successful hub-center steering motorcycle ever produced, with sales far eclipsing earlier or later examples of this design, such as the Yamaha GTS1000 or Bimota Tesi. About 10,000 Neracars were manufactured in the United States by the Ner-A-Car Corporation (under the Neracar name), while around 6,500 are believed to have been produced in England under licence by the Sheffield-Simplex company between 1921 and 1926 under the Ner-A-Car name.

== Design ==
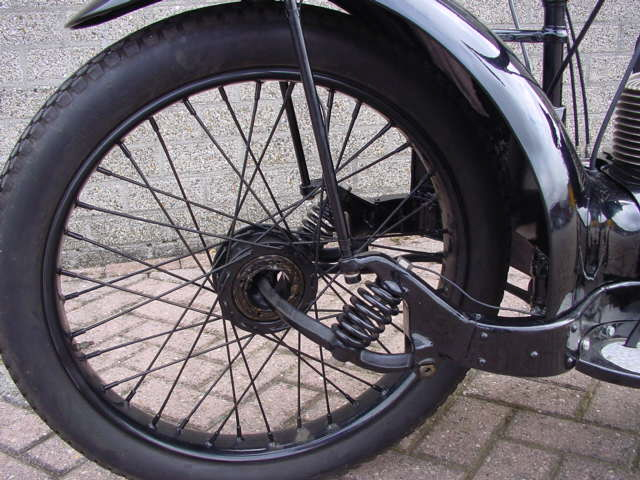
Front suspension of 1923 Ner-A-Car

Carl Neracher's design had several unusual features, including a low-slung perimeter frame chassis, hub-center steering, all-enclosing bodywork, the feet-forward riding position, and a friction drive transmission, driven by the flywheel of the engine. The low-slung frame, front suspension, hub-center steering, and long wheelbase contributed to the cycle's exceptional stability.

The friction drive transmission was similar in concept to a continuously variable transmission, but with five fixed indents on the shift lever corresponding to pre-set drive ratios. The driven friction wheel was moved between the center and outer rim of the flywheel to effect a change in drive ratio; nearer the center was a 'lower' speed, farther towards the rim of the flywheel was the 'higher' speed. The design was simple and ingenious, with a feeling nearly like an automatic transmission.

Carl Neracher relied on a design from the 1911 Detroit Bi-Car Co. for the Neracar, and a license was granted by Bi-Car president John J. Chapin, as acknowledged on the Neracar chassis. The Neracar resembled the Bi-Car in outline, which was "an attempt to construct a two-wheel vehicle embracing many desirable features of the automobile". The Bi-Car used an automobile type chassis of thin sheet steel, with splayed forward chassis arms holding the front wheel, that was steered by a linkage to the handlebars. The Neracar also resembled the Militaire Autocycle of 1911, which also used a feet-forward riding position, pressed-steel chassis, and hub-center steering. The Detroit Bi-Car and Militaire were still not the first production hub-center steered motorcycle: that title appears to belong to the Zenith Bi-Car of 1905, which was a design licensed from Tooley's Patent Bi-Car of 1904.

== Manufacture and promotion ==
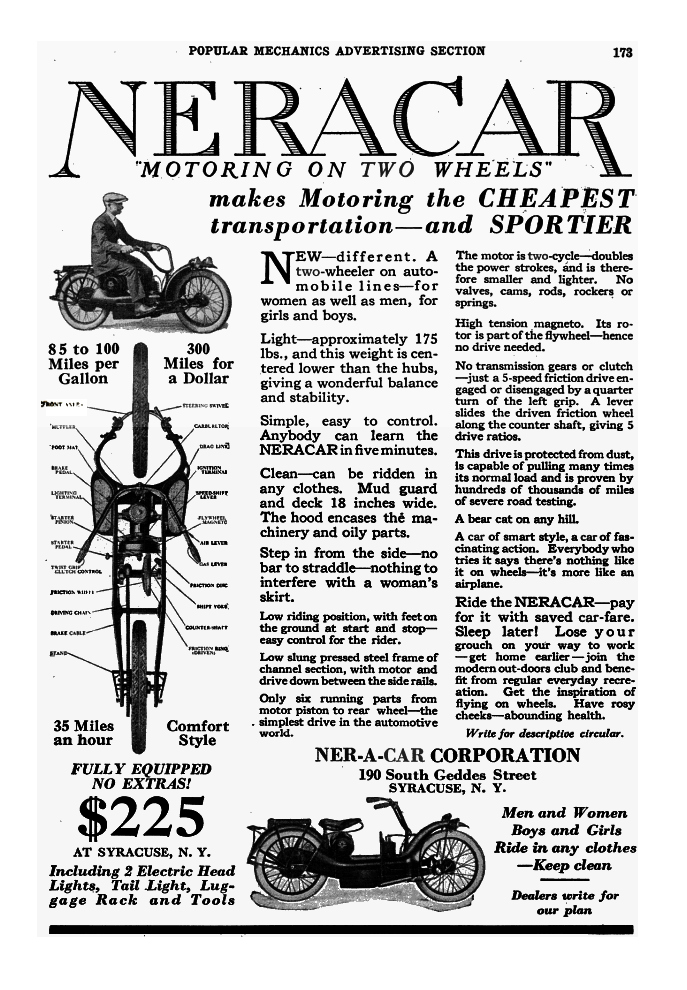
Neracar advertisement published in July 1922 in Popular Mechanics.

Neracher licensed his design to Sheffield-Simplex to manufacture Ner-A-Cars for the British and Commonwealth markets before he could find any investors to manufacture them in the United States. Eventually, a group of investors, including King C. Gillette and Crouse-Hinds Company founder Huntington B. Crouse, funded the Ner-A-Car Corporation, which began production of Neracars in October 1921.

The Ner-A-Car was marketed as a low cost alternative to a motor car. The advertisers publicized the Ner-A-Car's step-through design and its protection from road grime and engine fluids, both of which allowed riders to wear ordinary clothes, including skirts, cassocks, and kilts, while riding the cycle.

Erwin G. "Cannonball" Baker rode a Neracar from Staten Island, New York, to Los Angeles, California, in the autumn of 1922. The journey of 3,364.4 miles took 174 hours and one minute to complete, with operating costs totalling $15.70 at the time. Baker later started a Neracar dealership in Los Angeles.

The Ner-A-Car won several medals for reliability in long-distance road trials, including the team prize in the 1925 ACU 1000 mile Stock Machine Trial.

== Models ==
=== Neracar (United States) ===
The Ner-A-Car Corporation in Syracuse made three models of Neracar. The Type A had solo seating, the original 221 cc two-stroke engine, one headlight, and one taillight. The Type B had a larger engine, two seats, and two headlights. A commercial version, the Type CB, had a pair of headlights, a pair of drum brakes on the rear wheel, and a steel utility box rated to carry 150 pounds.

In the US a 255 cc model was introduced in 1924.

A five-speed Neracar was advertised as a "Christmas Special" for US$175 in November 1927.

Production of the Neracar ended in 1927.

=== Ner-A-Car (United Kingdom) ===
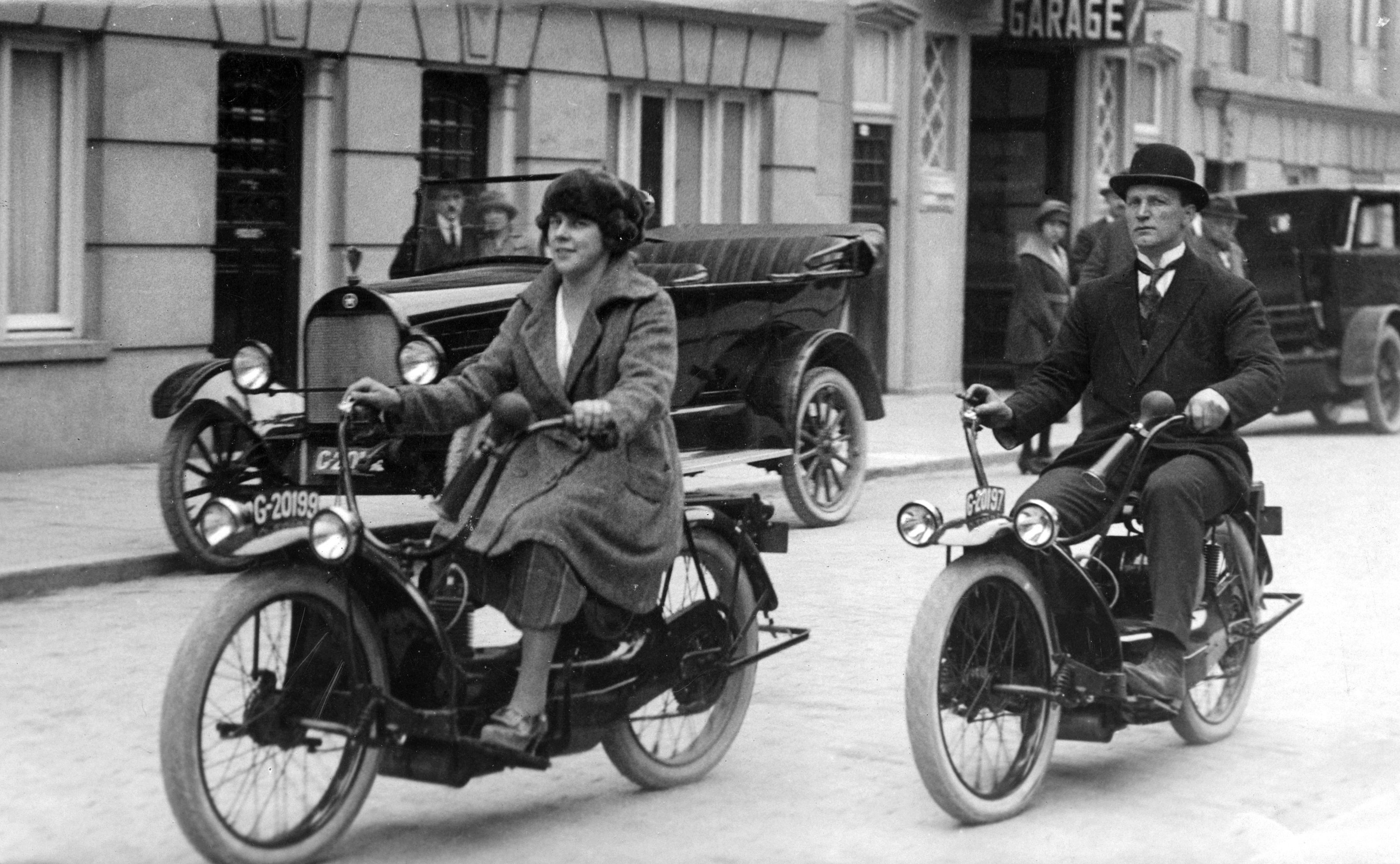
Ner-A-Cars in the Netherlands, 1923

British licensee Sheffield-Simplex began production of Ner-A-Cars in 1921 with the original American design with the 221 cc two-stroke engine and the friction drive transmission In 1923 the engine was enlarged to 285 cc, with a 70 mm bore and a 74 mm stroke.

Sheffield-Simplex developed a newer version with a Blackburne four-stroke side-valve engine, displacing 348 cc with a 71 mm bore and an 88 mm stroke, driving through a three-speed Sturmey-Archer manual transmission. This version was introduced in 1925 as the Model C, with the earlier two-stroke friction-drive model continuing as the Model B. A Sports C, with an overhead-valve version of the Model C engine, was also offered.

A de-luxe model was introduced in 1926 with swingarm rear suspension controlled by quarter-elliptic leaf springs, a bucket seat with air cushions, and a fairing with an adjustable Triplex windshield and an instrument panel. A countershaft concentric with the swingarm pivot was driven by a chain from the transmission and drove the rear wheel. The addition of rear suspension increased the wheelbase of the de-luxe model to 68.5 inches (1,740 mm)

Production of the Ner-A-Car at Sheffield-Simplex ended in the autumn of 1926.

== See also ==
- List of motorcycles of the 1910s
- List of motorcycles of the 1920s
