= Peraves =

Swiss motorcycle manufacturer

Peraves AG
- Industry: Motorcycles
- Founded: 1972
- Headquarters: Uster, Switzerland
- Products: Ecomobile; MonoTracer

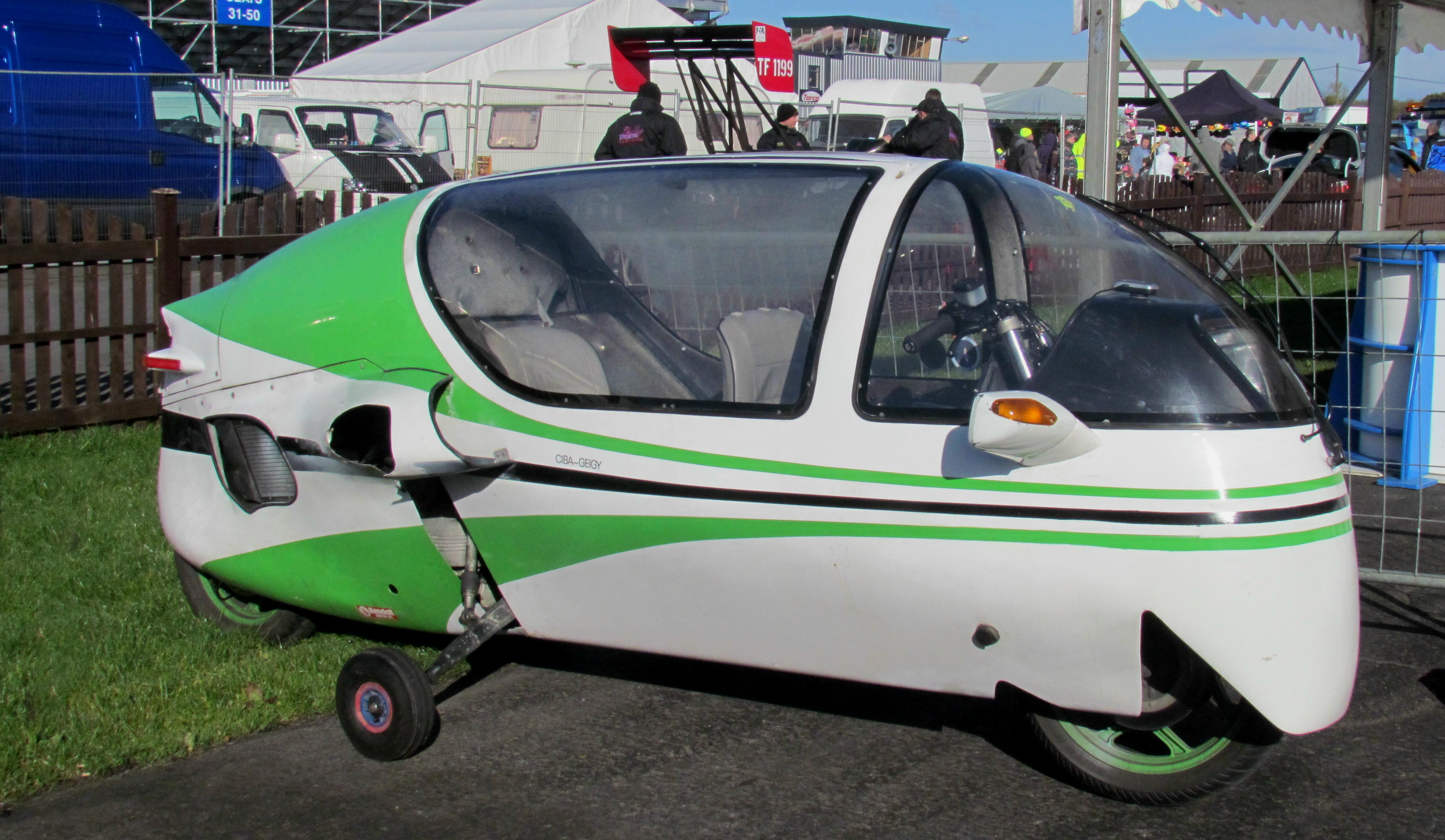
Peraves Ecomobile

Peraves AG was a Swiss manufacturer of high-end aerodynamically-enhanced cabin motorcycles. It won the Automotive X Prize for its entirely electric X-Tracer in 2010. By 2019 it had declared bankruptcy.

== History ==
Peraves AG was founded in 1972 by Swissair Pilot Arnold Wagner. Wagner finished a prototype of an enclosed motorcycle in 1982, and was able to convince the Swiss government to make it street legal in 1985. The vehicle, christened the Ecomobile, was approved by the TÜV, which allowed it to be sold in the EU in 1991.

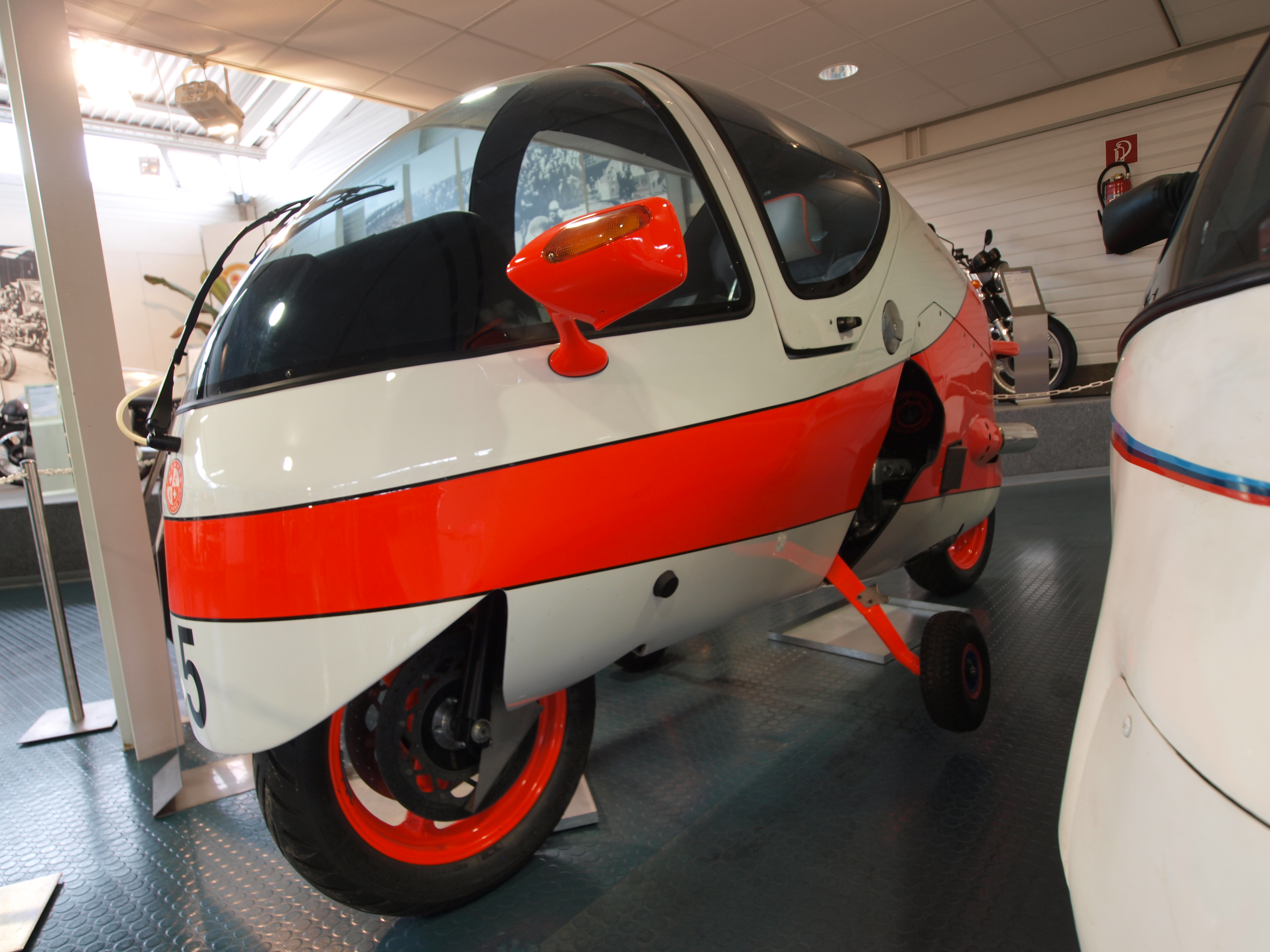
Ecomobile with BMW-K-Motor

== Production ==
Peraves produced 90 Ecomobiles from 1991 to 2005 until the main factory in the Czech Republic burned down. In response, Peraves decided to commit to redesigning the Ecomobile. The new, more affordable design was named the MonoTracer. It was named number 41 in Time's list of the 50 best inventions of 2008. The electric version was named E-Tracer.

In 2010, Peraves won the $2.5 million Progressive Insurance Automotive X-Prize with a prototype version of the electric MonoTracer/E-Tracer, renamed the X-Tracer, capable of driving up to 150 miles per hour (240 km/h) and accelerating from 0 to 60 mph (0 to 97 km/h) in under four seconds. The design was originally suggested by Stefano Paris, an aero-mechanical engineer who saw the gas version on display.

In 2013, the X-Tracer was blocked from entering the United States while at the Port of Los Angeles by the EPA, United States Customs, and the Transportation Department because the vehicle didn't comply with government regulations. Electric vehicle advocate Paul Scott commented, "For the EPA to be in the way of this is as bizarre at it gets."
