= Honda Silver Wing 600 =

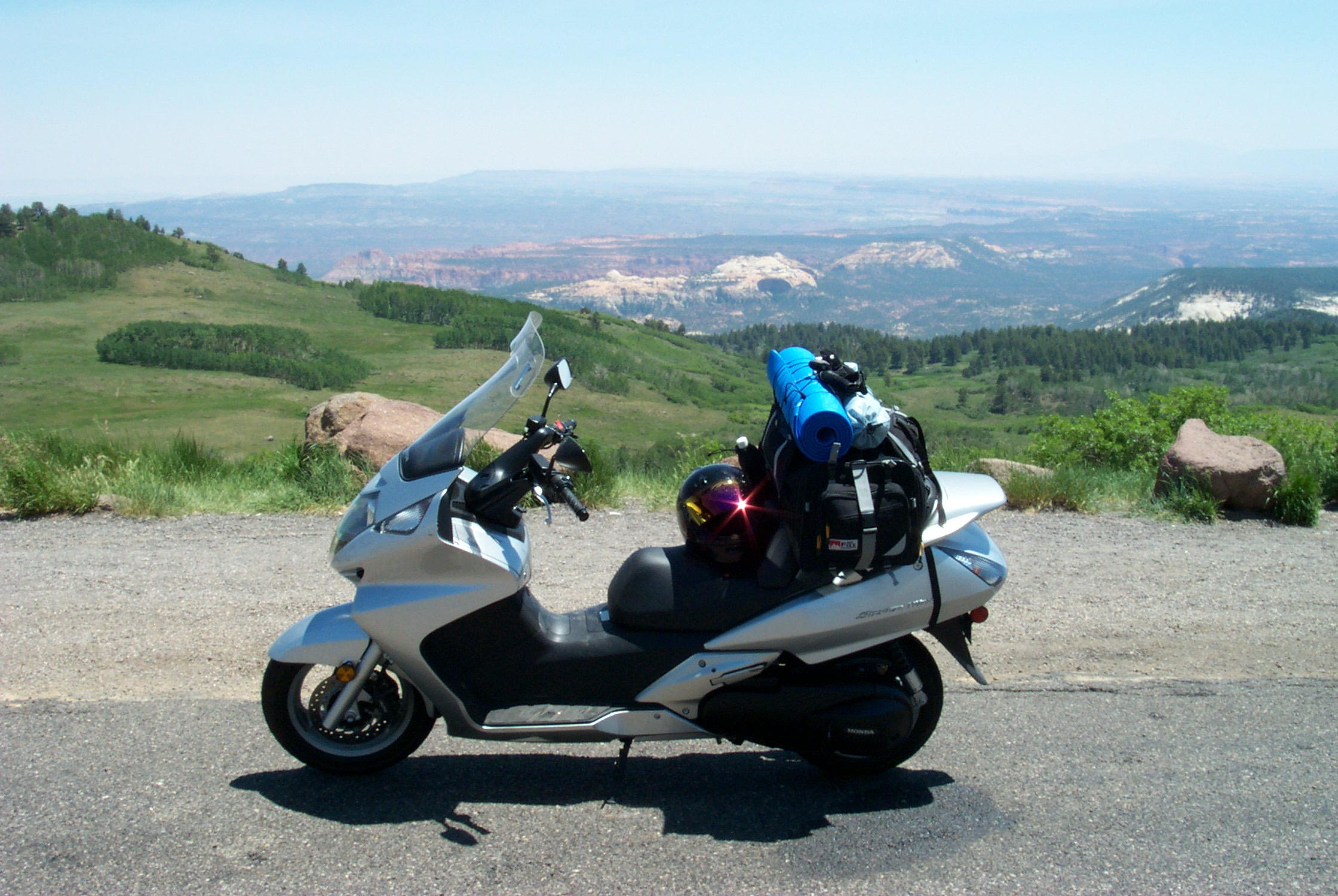
- Honda Silver Wing (FSC600)
- Manufacturer: Honda
- Also called: FJS600 Silver Wing, FSC600, SW-T600
- Production: 2001–2013 (United States), 2001–2014 (selected markets)
- Class: Maxi-scooter
- Engine: 582 cc (35.5 cu in) 4-valve EFI DOHC parallel twin
- Bore / stroke: 72 mm × 71.5 mm (2.83 in × 2.81 in)
- Compression ratio: 10.2:1
- Power: 49.6 hp (37.0 kW) @ 7,000 rpm (claimed)
- Torque: 54 N⋅m (40 lb⋅ft) @ 5,500 rpm (claimed)
- Transmission: CVT
- Suspension: Front: 41 mm hydraulic fork, 120 mm (4.7 in) travel Rear: swingarm with dual hydraulic shocks with five-position spring-preload adjustability, 114 mm (4.5 in) travel
- Brakes: Front: Single 276 mm disc with Combined Braking System three-piston caliper Rear: Single 240 mm disc with Combined Braking System twin-piston caliper and cable operated parking brake Optional ABS (varies by market)
- Tires: Front: 120/80-14; Rear: 150/70-13
- Rake, trail: 26.8° / 103 mm (4.1 in)
- Wheelbase: 62.8 in (1,600 mm)
- Seat height: 29.7 in (750 mm)
- Weight: 551 lb (250 kg) (claimed) (wet)
- Fuel capacity: 4.2 US gal (16 L)
- Related: Honda GL500/GL650 Silver Wing (nameplate only)

The Honda Silver Wing 600 (also marketed as the FJS600 Silver Wing and SW-T600 in various regions) is a 582 cc (35.5 cu in) maxi-scooter produced by Honda between 2001 and 2014. Marketed under model codes FJS600, FSC600, and SW-T600 depending on region, it was Honda's largest displacement scooter until the introduction of the larger-capacity Honda Integra and later the Honda X-ADV.

== Development and introduction ==
Honda developed the Silver Wing 600 during the late 1990s in response to growing European demand for high-displacement scooters capable of highway travel. The model was unveiled for the 2001 model year as a premium touring scooter positioned above the 250–400 cc class.

The Silver Wing nameplate had previously been used on Honda's GL500 and GL650 touring motorcycles during the early 1980s, but the maxi-scooter shared no mechanical lineage with those models.

== Design ==
=== Engine ===
The scooter uses a 582 cc liquid-cooled DOHC parallel twin with electronic fuel injection. The engine is mounted in a stressed-member layout within the frame, reducing vibration and improving rigidity for high-speed touring.

=== Transmission ===
A continuously variable transmission (CVT) with a centrifugal clutch provides twist-and-go operation. Honda used a variator ratio tuned for highway stability and reduced belt wear compared with smaller scooters.

=== Chassis and braking ===
The model incorporates Honda's Combined Braking System (CBS), with ABS available in many markets starting in 2003. The linked system applies both front and rear calipers when either brake lever is used, reducing stopping distances on typical road surfaces.

The scooter uses a tubular steel frame, a 41 mm front fork, and dual rear shocks with adjustable preload.

=== Comfort and storage ===
Under-seat storage accommodates two helmets (market dependent). A glove box and optional top case accessories were offered by Honda. Touring ergonomics include a stepped saddle and integrated windscreen.

== Distinctive features ==
The Silver Wing's implementation of Honda's Combined Braking System is configured so that the left brake lever operates both the rear disc and the centre piston of the three-piston front caliper, while the right lever controls the remaining two front pistons. This arrangement distributes braking force automatically between the wheels and gives the scooter braking characteristics closer to those of a midsize motorcycle than to smaller urban scooters according to period road tests.

Unlike some maxi-scooters that mount the engine and transmission as part of the swingarm assembly, the Silver Wing uses a frame-mounted parallel-twin engine with a separate swingarm, reducing unsprung mass and contributing to straight-line stability and ride comfort. Reviewers also noted the model's relatively simple CVT layout compared with more complex multi-mode systems such as that on the Suzuki Burgman 650, which was perceived as giving the Honda lower long-term maintenance demands.

Road tests frequently remarked on the Silver Wing's smoothness and low vibration at motorway speeds, with both the twin counterbalancers and the rigid frame mounting cited as contributing factors.

== Model evolution ==
=== 2001–2006 ===
- Launch of the FJS600 (Europe/Japan) and FSC600 (North America).
- Optional ABS added in 2003 in several markets.

=== 2007–2009 update ===
- Revised fairing and windscreen shapes.
- Updated EFI mapping for emissions compliance in Europe and North America.

=== 2010 SW-T600 ===
- Honda introduced the SW-T600 in Europe, a dual-headlight restyled variant sold alongside or replacing the FJS600 in select countries.

=== Final years ===
- The United States received its last model year in 2013, confirmed by Honda's FSC600A specification release and subsequent absence from later U.S. model line-ups.
- Parts catalogues for the 2014 FJS600A/Silver Wing 600 GT ABS indicate ongoing production for at least some European markets into the 2014 model year.

== Performance ==
Instrumented road tests reported an indicated top speed of about 100 mph (160 km/h) and brisk mid-range acceleration typical of Honda's twin-cylinder scooter engines. Fuel economy figures published in European type-approval data and road tests generally fall in the mid-40s mpg-US range (around 5.1 litres per 100 kilometres (55 mpg_{‑imp}; 46 mpg_{‑US})).

== Market position ==
The Silver Wing competed with other maxi-scooters including the Yamaha TMAX, Suzuki Burgman 650, and Piaggio X9 series. Period reviews often noted Honda's reliability record, smooth engine, and lower maintenance costs compared with some rivals, while also commenting on its conservative styling and relatively soft suspension.

== Discontinuation ==
Honda ended U.S. sales after the 2013 model year. European parts catalogues show the Silver Wing 600 GT ABS still listed for 2014, after which the model disappears from Honda's large-scooter line-ups, indicating the end of production. Honda subsequently shifted its large-scooter offerings toward hybrid and motorcycle-based platforms such as the NC700/750 Integra and later the X-ADV.
