= Honda Integra (disambiguation) =

Honda Integra may refer to:

- Honda Integra, a compact car made by Honda from 1985 to 2006.
  - BTC-T Honda Integra Type R, a racing car used in the British Touring Car Championship from 2005 until 2011.
- Honda VT250F, the VT250F Integra, a sport bike made by Honda from 1982 to 1990.
- Honda NC700D Integra, a maxi-scooter/touring motorcycle made by Honda since 2012.
