= HFT =

HFT may refer to:

== Businesses and organisations ==
- Harbor Freight Tools, an American retailer
- Hft (formerly Home Farm Trust), a British disability charity

== Science and technology ==
- High-flow therapy, a method of delivering respiratory gases
- Hardware Fault Tolerance, in IEC 61508
- Himalayan Frontal Thrust, a geologic fault

== Transportation ==
- Hammerfest Airport (IATA code), Norway
- Hoh Fuk Tong stop (MTR station code), Hong Kong
- Human Friendly Transmission, a motorcycle transmission

== Other uses ==
- High-frequency trading, type of algorithmic trading
- Hunter Field Target, a target shooting sport
- "Hot for Teacher", a song by Van Halen
