= Honda NM4 =

Feet first motorcycle

Honda NM4 Vultus (NC750J)
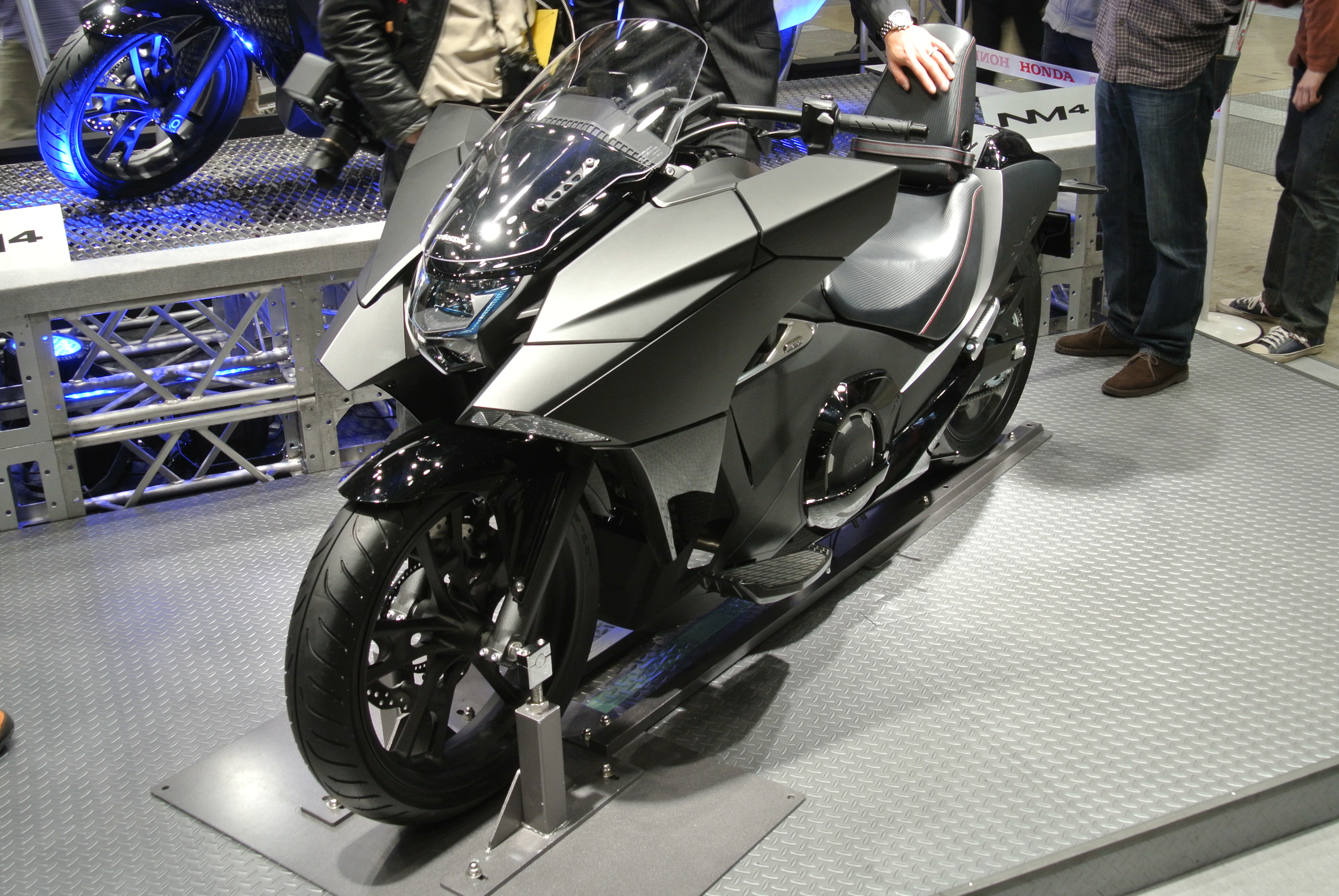
- NM4 concept at 2014 Tokyo Motor Show
- Manufacturer: Honda Motor Company
- Production: 2014–2019
- Class: Feet forwards power cruiser
- Engine: 745 cc 8-valve SOHC parallel-twin with twin balance shafts 10.7:1 compression ratio
- Power: 40.3 kW / 54.8 PS
- Transmission: 6-speed hydraulic, dual clutch transmission
- Frame type: Steel diamond
- Suspension: 43 mm forks
- Brakes: Front: 1 × 320 mm wave disc, two-piston caliper Rear: 1 × 240 mm wave disc, single-piston caliper ABS
- Tires: Front: 120/70 ZR18; Rear: 200/50 ZR17
- Rake, trail: 33°, 110 mm
- Wheelbase: 1,645 mm
- Dimensions: L: 2,380 mm W: 933 mm at the mirrors H: 1,170 mm
- Seat height: 650 mm
- Weight: 245 kg (540 lb) (curb weight) (wet)
- Fuel capacity: 11.6 L (2.6 imp gal; 3.1 US gal)
- Fuel consumption: 28.4 km/L (80 mpg_{‑imp}; 67 mpg_{‑US}) (WMTC mode)
- Related: Honda NC700 series

The Honda NM4 is a feet forwards motorcycle introduced by Honda for sale in June 2014. Internal documents, such as the service manual, refer to it as NC700J for US market or NC750J for Japan market. The motorcycle is sold in Japan, Europe, the United Kingdom, and North America.

The NM4 was shown under the name "NM4 Vultus" as a concept motorcycle at the March, 2014 Osaka Motorcycle Show and Tokyo Motor Show. In April, Honda dropped the "Vultus" name in some markets but the motorcycle continued to be called the "NM4 Vultus" in branding and marketing material.

A modified version of this motorcycle was used as the Ride Macher, personal motorcycle of Kamen Rider Mach in Kamen Rider Drive. It is also represented in GTA V by the Dinka Vindicator.

== Design ==
It has a feet forwards design compared to Kaneda's motorcycle in the anime Akira. Styling was provocative; critics described it as "front massive", as a "scootercycle hybrid" similar to Honda's DN-01, a "mashup", and one said "it isn't pretty".

The engine and dual clutch transmission were sourced from the production NC700 motorcycle/NC700D "Integra" scooter. The concept NM4-02 variant had panniers; the NM4-01 had none. The NM4-02 will have 7.5 liter pannier on each side. The Honda website says the model is a "limited edition".

=== Specifications ===
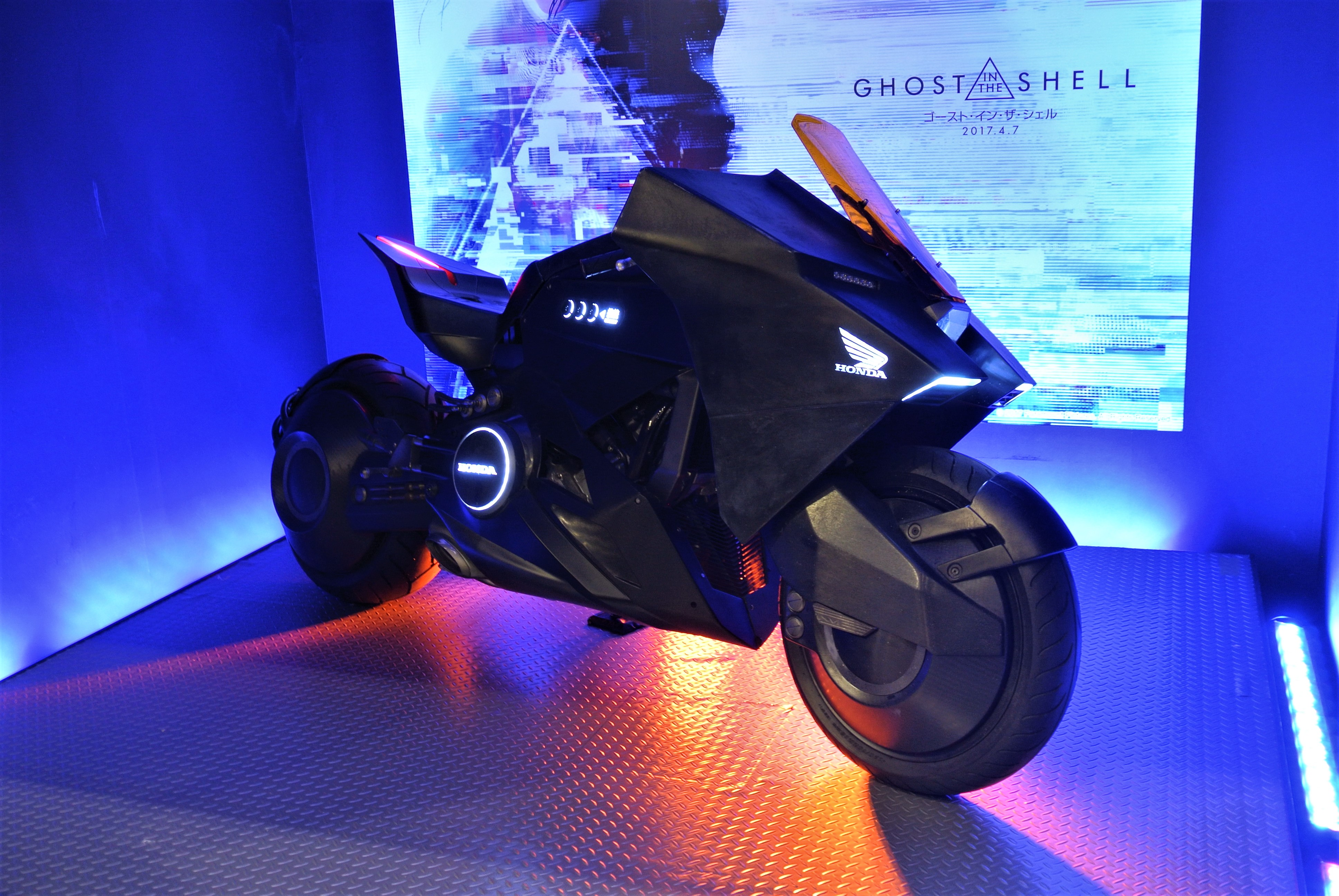
The customized NM4 featured in Ghost in the Shell.

Specifications in the adjacent box are from Top Speed.
