= Honda NC700D Integra =

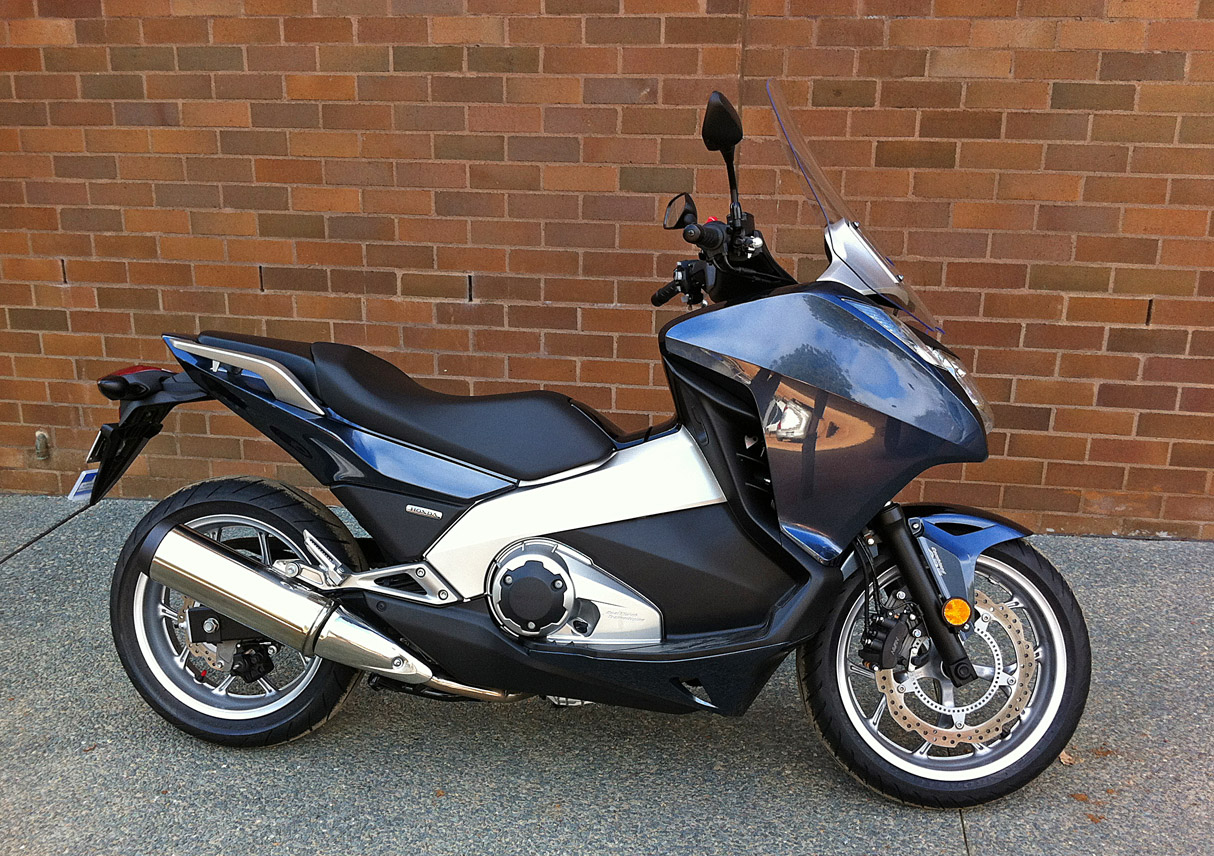
- Manufacturer: Honda Motor Company
- Production: 2012-2020
- Assembly: Kumamoto, Japan
- Successor: Honda X-ADV
- Class: Maxi-scooter/Tourer
- Engine: Honda RC61E 670 cc (41 cu in) SOHC Parallel twin engine, 4-stroke, 4 valves per cylinder, liquid-cooled 745 cc (45.5 cu in) in Europe
- Bore / stroke: 73 mm × 80 mm (2.9 in × 3.1 in); 77 mm × 80 mm (3.0 in × 3.1 in) in Europe
- Compression ratio: 10.7:1
- Top speed: 168 km/h (104 mph)
- Power: 38.1 kW (51.1 hp) @ 6,250 rpm 40.3 kW (54.0 hp) in Europe
- Torque: 62 N⋅m (46 lb⋅ft) @ 4,750 rpm 68 N⋅m (50 lb⋅ft) in Europe
- Ignition type: Computer-controlled digital transistorised with electronic advance
- Transmission: 6-speed dual-clutch transmission Chain drive
- Frame type: Rigid tube steel diamond
- Suspension: 41 mm telescopic forks, 120 mm travel (front), single monoshock damper, 120 mm travel (rear)
- Brakes: 320 mm single wavy hydraulic disc with 3-piston calipers and sintered metal pads (front), 240 mm single wavy hydraulic disc with single-piston caliper and sintered metal pads (rear)
- Tires: Metzeler Roadtec Z8 Interact or Bridgestone Battlax BT-023; 120/70-ZR17 (58W) front, 160/60-ZR17 (69W) rear
- Rake, trail: 27˚ rake, 110 mm trail
- Wheelbase: 1,525 mm
- Dimensions: L: 2,195 mm W: 790 mm H: 1,440 mm
- Seat height: 790 mm (Europe), 775 mm (JDM)
- Weight: 238 kg (525 lb) (118.5 kg front, 119.5 kg rear) (wet)
- Fuel capacity: 14.1 L
- Fuel consumption: 3.58 L/100 km (79 mpg_{‑imp}; 65.7 mpg_{‑US}) (claimed)
- Turning radius: 3.0 m
- Related: NC700S/NC700X; NM4

The Honda NC700D/NC750D Integra is a motorcycle/scooter hybrid made by Honda since 2012. Known internally as the RC62, the Integra was originally unveiled as the New Mid Concept in 2010, before being presented in production form at EICMA 2011 in Milan. The Integra shares a platform with two motorcycle variants, the NC700S (RC61) and the NC700X (RC63). All three variants are powered by a 670 cc engine derived from the unit used in the Honda Fit automobile. The Integra will be available with two different power outputs, one version develops a peak power output of 38.1 kW (51.1 hp) at 6,250 rpm and 62 N⋅m (46 lb⋅ft) of torque at 4,750 rpm, while the other has a lower output of 35 kW (47 hp) and 60 N⋅m (44 lb⋅ft) to meet 2013 A2 European licensing regulations.

The Integra features motorcycle style 17-inch (430 mm) high-pressure die-cast aluminum alloy wheels and has only 15 litres (0.53 cu ft) of under-seat storage, as the fuel tank is also located under the saddle. Power is delivered through a six-speed dual-clutch transmission with one manual and two automatic drive modes, while combined ABS brakes provide stopping power. German magazine Scooter und Sport tested the Integra and reported a 0 to 100 km/h (0 to 62 mph) time of 5.6 seconds on the way to a measured top speed of 166.9 km/h or 103.7 mph (175 km/h or 109 mph indicated).

The Integra was updated for the 2014 model year with engine capacity increased to 745cc.

== Engine ==
The Integra is powered by a single overhead camshaft 670 cc (41 cu in) parallel-twin engine that is essentially the 1.3 L Honda Fit engine chopped in half — it even retains the same bore and stroke dimensions — tilted 62° forward to provide a low centre of gravity, with near uniform weight distribution. The undersquare engine has programmed fuel injection, separate timing profiles for each cylinder, and is tuned to deliver powerful torque in the low- to mid-speed range. The engine was designed to deliver a "pleasant throbbing feel" of a V-twin through the use of a 270° crankshaft, which Honda "deliberately designed with a uniaxial primary balancer" even though the primary vibration of the crankshaft could have been balanced perfectly using a biaxial balance shaft.

The fuel consumption figure of 3.58 L/100 km (79 mpg_{‑imp}; 65.7 mpg_{‑US}) has been attributed to the low number of moving parts in the engine: The oil pump is driven by the balance shaft, while the camshaft also drives the water pump. The design also resulted in water hoses that are 30% shorter. The pistons are resin-coated and lightweight aluminum material is used for the friction-reducing roller rocker arm.

== Transmission ==
The Integra comes standard with a second generation of the six-speed dual-clutch transmission first used on the Honda VFR1200F. The version used on the Integra is lighter and more compact due to a simplified hydraulic circuit; a learning function has also been added to each of the drive modes to detect a variety of riding environments. The system uses heavy duty large-diameter clutches to deal with the rigours of use in stop/start city traffic.

"Drive" mode on the transmission generally selects a high gear ratio, keeping engine speeds between 2,000 and 2,500 rpm, while selecting "Sport" keeps the engine running at a higher speed for more power on the open road.

== Marketing ==
The Integra is sold as a scooter in many markets but as a touring motorcycle in some. For example, it appears in the 2012 Honda Netherlands "touring" brochure alongside well known tourers like the Goldwing 1800. Reviewers have noted the model as a hybrid of scooter (or maxi-scooter) and motorcycle. Guy Procter from Motor Cycle News referred to the Integra as a “super-scooter”, but wrote that it might be “better understood as the conclusive bridge-builder between mainstream commuting and motorcycling”, noting that it appealed to riders of both motorcycles and scooters, as well as switchers from cars, something that a previous hybrid, the Honda DN-01 had failed to do.

== 2014 update ==
The NC series was updated for the 2014 model year with an increase in engine capacity to 745 cc (through a 4 mm increase in bore), with power rising to 40.3 kW at 6,250 rpm and torque to 68 Nm at 4,750 rpm. The NC750 Integra also received a new aluminum swing arm, which superseded the box section steel arm of the NC700 Integra . The increased performance was also matched with a software update to the dual clutch transmission and taller gearing that provide improvement to fuel economy. Minor changes to the fairing and seat also provide increased leg room for taller riders.
