= Honda Valkyrie =

Cruiser motorcycle

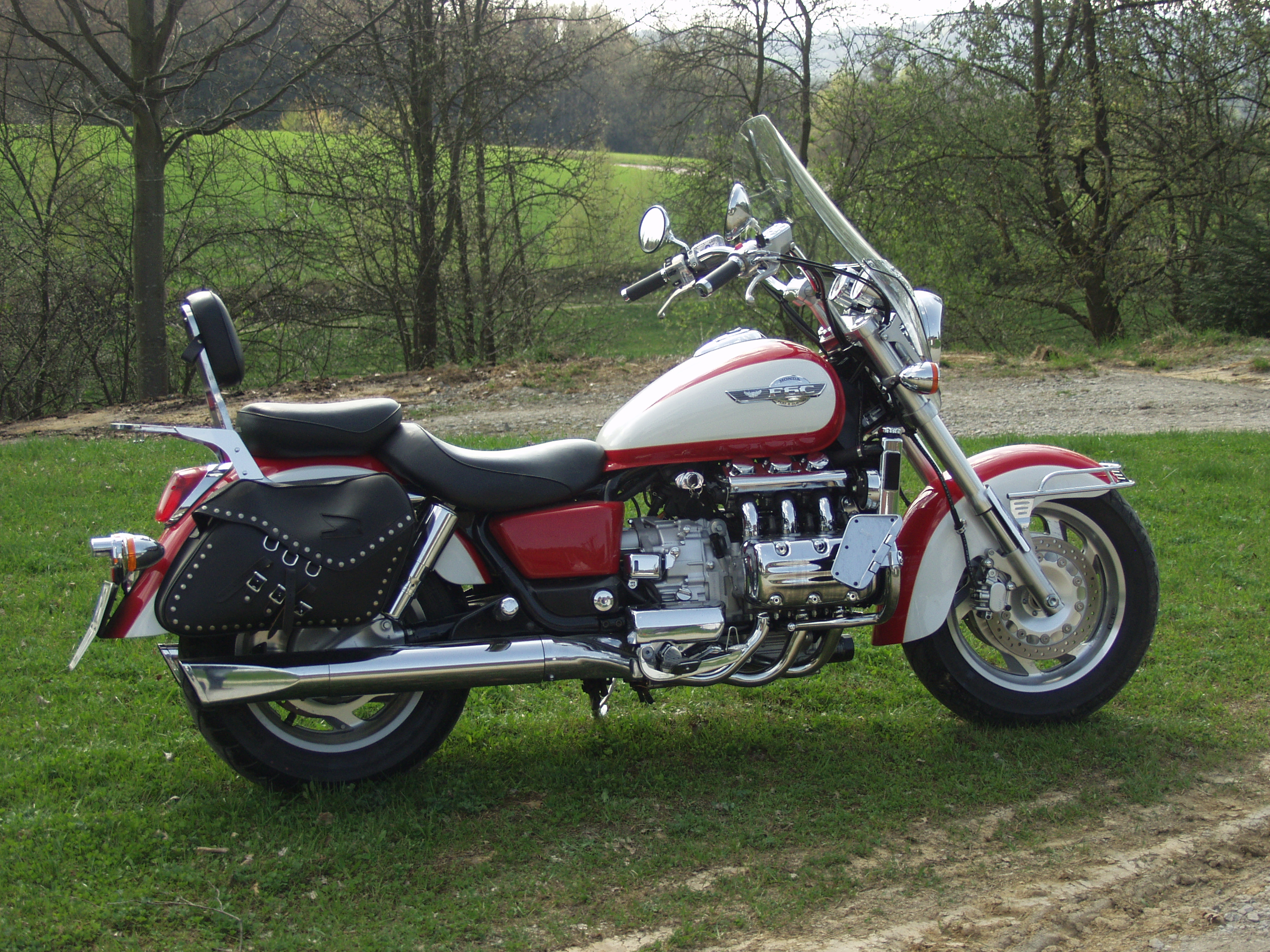
- Manufacturer: Honda
- Also called: GL1500C Base, 1500CT Tourer, and 1500CF Interstate F6C
- Production: 1997–2003 Base and Tourer models, 1999-2003 Interstate
- Engine: 1,520 cc (93 cu in) liquid-cooled SOHC flat-6
- Bore / stroke: 71 mm × 64 mm
- Compression ratio: 9.8:1
- Top speed: 131 mph (211 km/h)
- Power: 100.0 hp (74.6 kW) (rear wheel)
- Torque: 102.3 lb⋅ft (138.7 N⋅m) (rear wheel)
- Ignition type: CDI
- Transmission: Five-speed manual, shaft-drive
- Suspension: Front: 45 mm inverted fork, 130 mm travel Rear: Dual shock, preload adjustable, 120 mm travel
- Brakes: Front: Dual 296 mm floating discs, 2-piston calipers Rear: Single 316 mm disc, 2-piston caliper
- Tires: Front: 150/80R-17; Rear: 180/70R-16
- Wheelbase: 1,690 mm (67 in)
- Seat height: 735 mm (28.9 in)
- Weight: 300 kg (660 lb) (dry); 327 kg (721 lb) (wet)
- Fuel capacity: 5.3 gallons (Base and Tourer models and 7.2 gallons on the Interstate

The Honda Valkyrie is a motorcycle that was manufactured by Honda from 1997 to 2003. It was designated GL1500C in the US market and F6C ("Flat Six Custom") in other markets.

In the 1990s there was a resurgence of interest in cruiser motorcycles, that generally feature a V-twin engine. The idea of an American cruiser styled motorcycle featuring a flat six engine came from Josef Boyd.

The Valkyrie engine is a 1,520 cubic centimetres (93 cubic inches), liquid-cooled, horizontally opposed flat-six engine shared with Honda's Gold Wing 4th generation model, unlike the V-twin engine commonly found on "cruiser" style motorcycles. In its transplant from the Gold Wing, the most notable engine changes were the camshaft, use of solid lifters (instead of hydraulic lifters as the Gold Wing) and the change to six individual 28 mm carburetors, one for each cylinder, changes which increased power and torque.

The Valkyrie was offered with a reverse gear in Japan. The Valkyrie was made in the United States at the Honda motorcycle plant in Marysville, Ohio.

== Other models ==
=== Standard, Tourer and Interstate ===
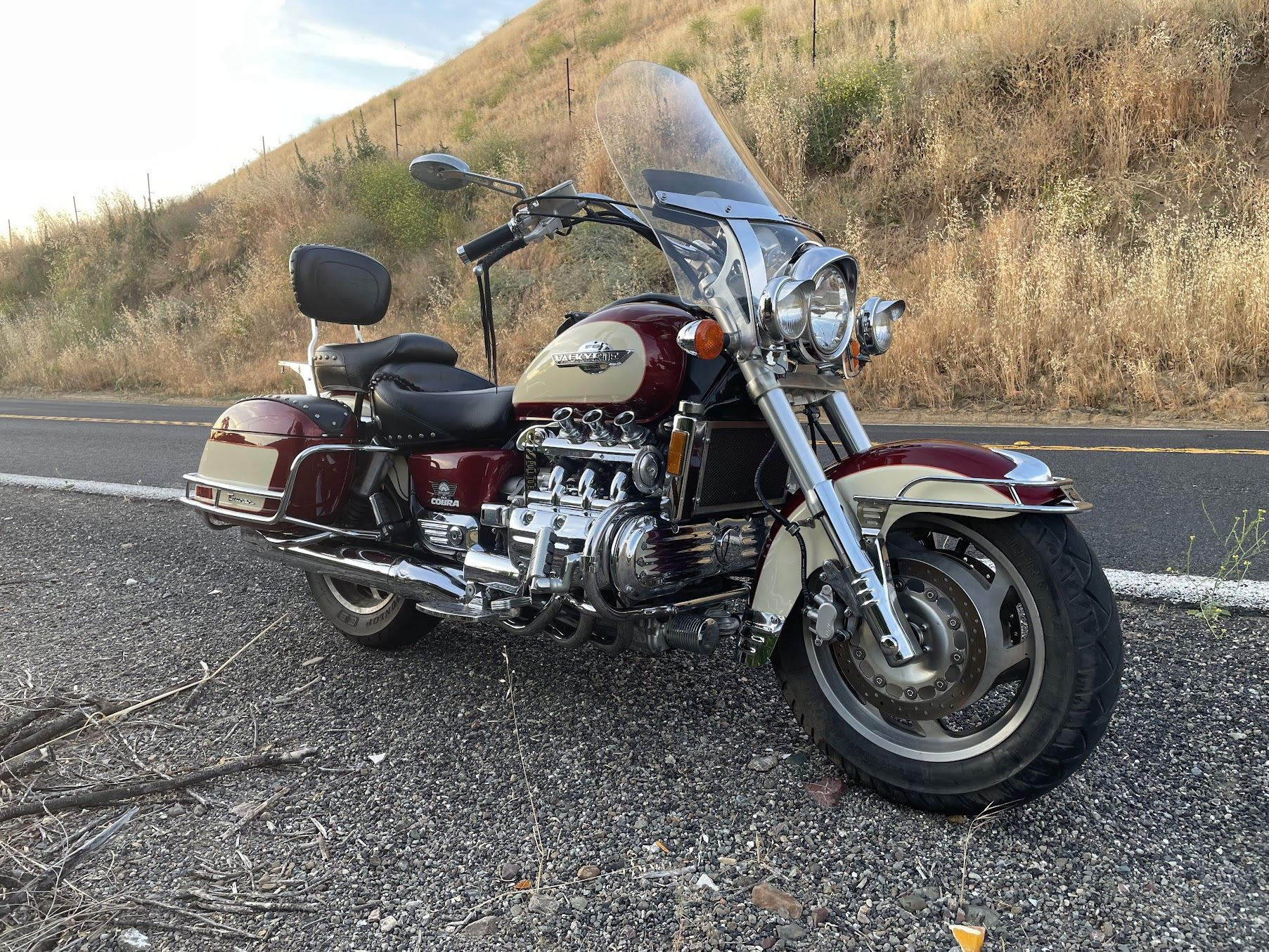
Honda Valkyrie Tourer

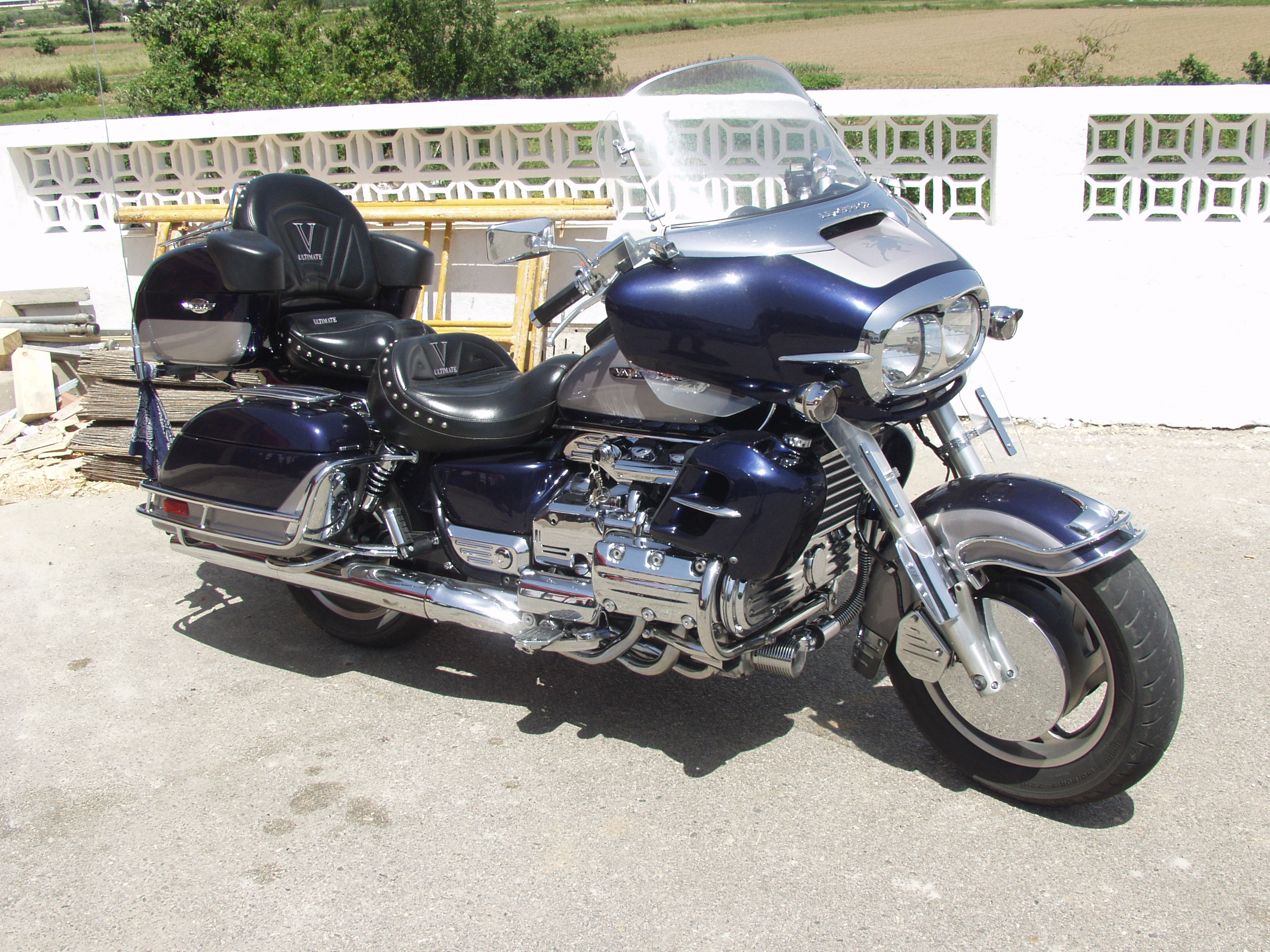
Honda Valkyrie Interstate

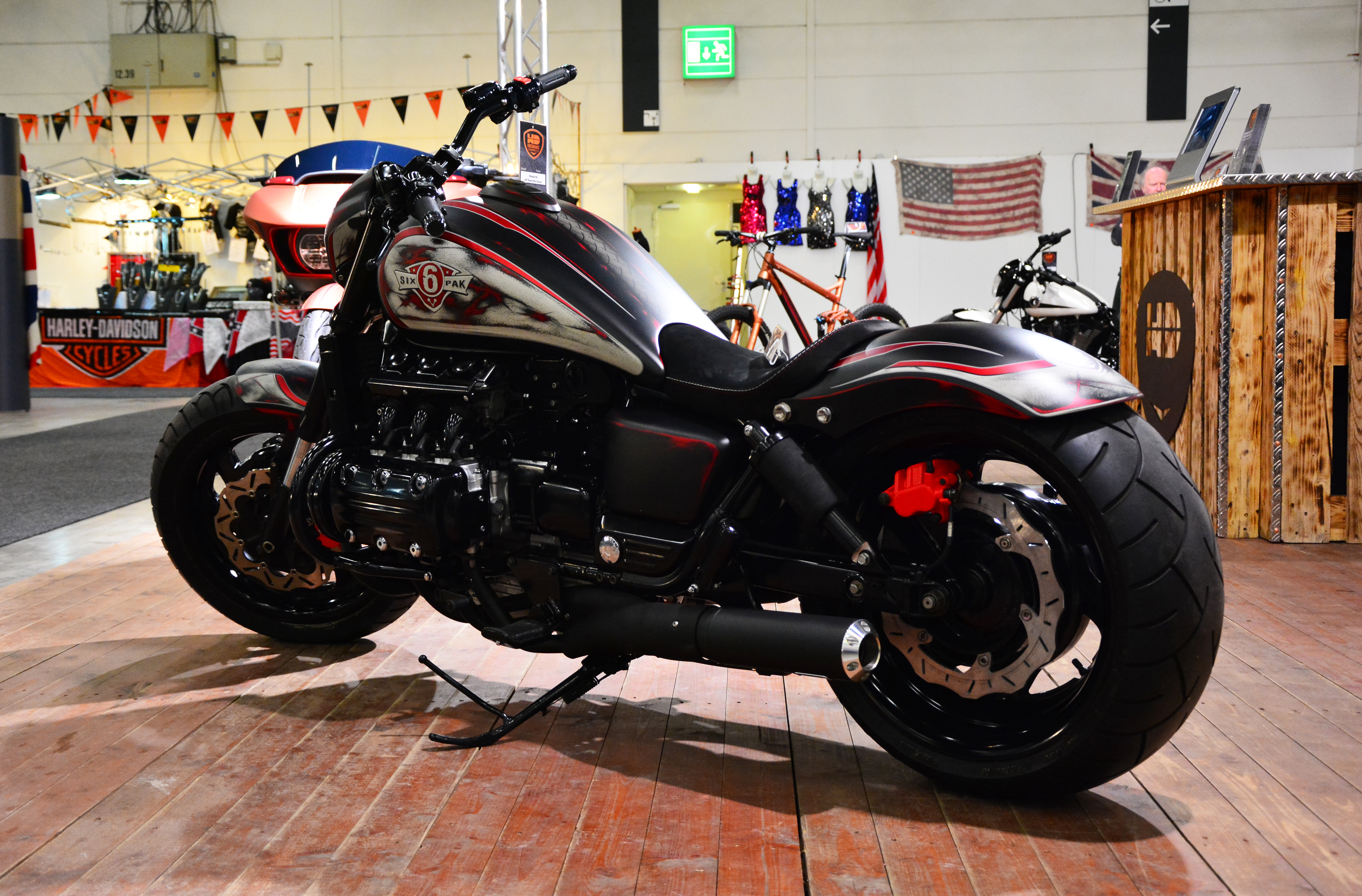
Customised Honda F6

On introduction in 1997, a naked Standard and later, a Tourer model were offered. The Tourer included a windshield and lockable hard saddlebags. It was designated as a GL1500CT

In 1999, the Interstate model was added to the lineup, which included a fork-mounted fairing along with a larger capacity fuel tank with 26 Liters (6.9 US gallons) and a trunk at the rear of the motorcycle.

It also featured a stiffer frame, better shocks, AM/FM radio, radiator pods for better wind management and wired intercom. Honda offered optional CB radio and fog lights mounted inside of the radiator pods. It was designated as the GL1500CF.

As sales eventually dwindled, the Interstate and Tourer models were dropped after 2001, leaving only the Standard model remaining. 2003 saw the Standard offered only in black and was the last year of the original Valkyrie.

=== Rune ===
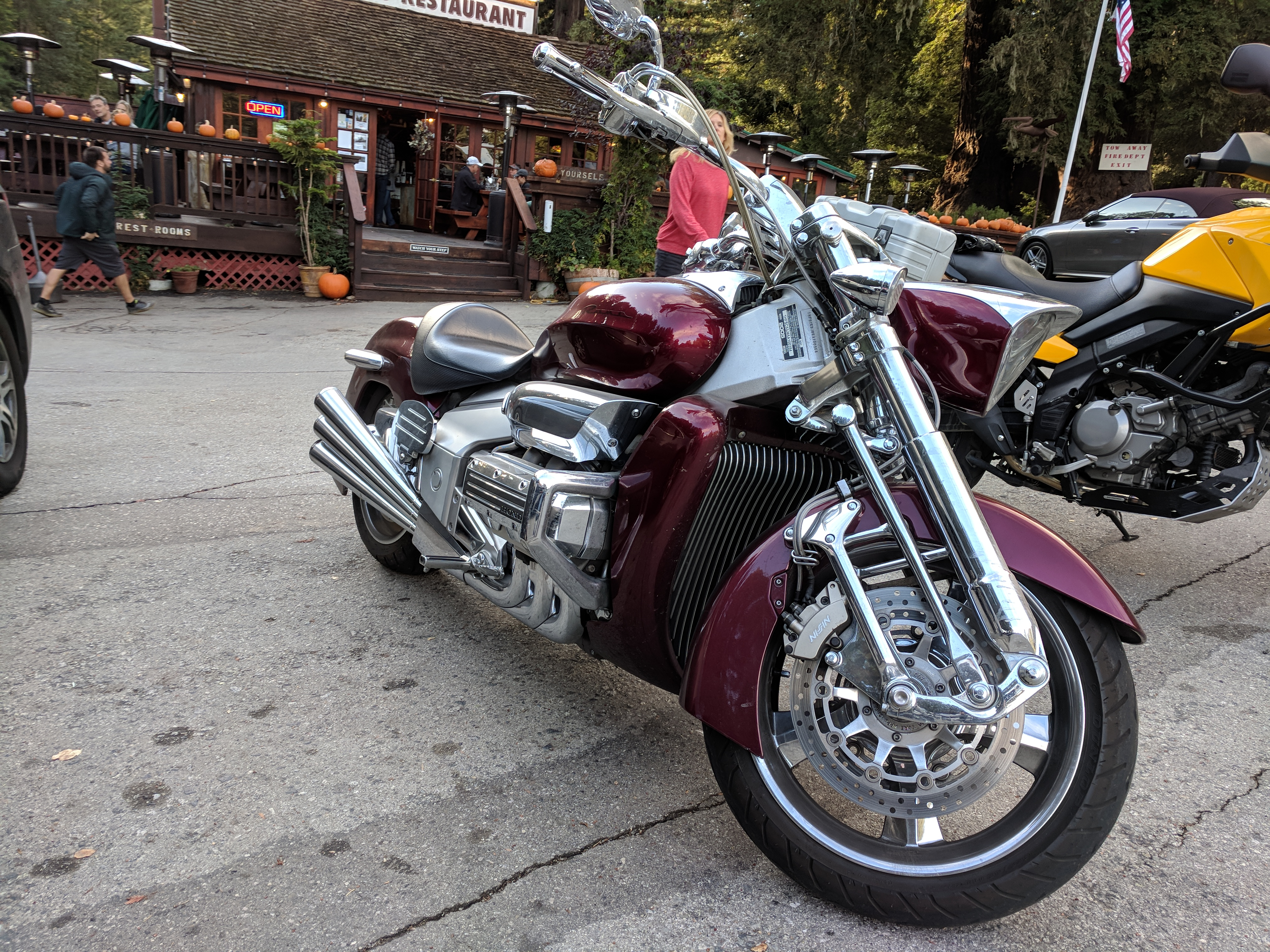
Honda Valkyrie Rune front view

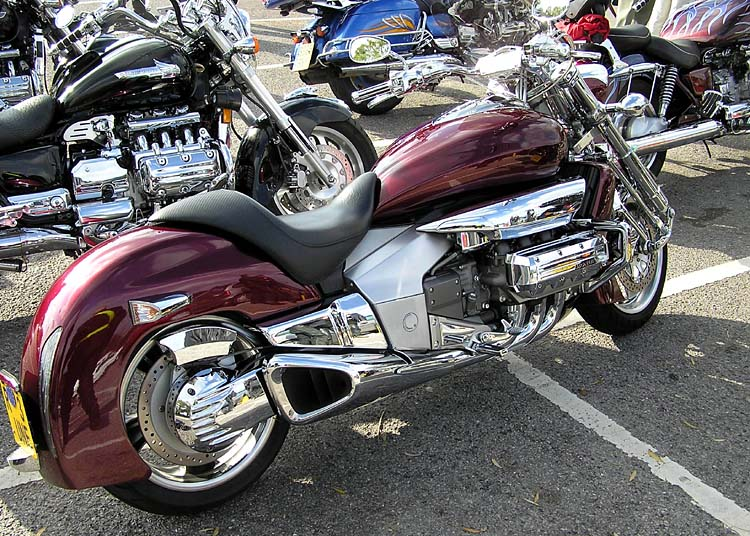
Honda Valkyrie Rune side view

Honda introduced a limited-edition model in 2003 named the Valkyrie Rune, with a 1,832-cubic-centimetre (111.8 cu in) engine, sourced from the 5th-generation Honda Gold Wing. It was a major departure from the original Valkyrie in both styling and purpose.

The objective of the Rune was to be a tour de force, showing what Honda could develop. To quote the project leader, Masanari Aoki, "No performance goals, no distinct function, purchase price not a consideration."

Its debut price in 2004 was US$27,000, but they actually cost over $100,000 each to manufacture. That is mostly because aside from the engine, all remaining parts were custom made by Honda exclusively for the Rune.

Though production numbers are not confirmed, allegedly Honda made around 3,000 units and assigned one to each licensed dealership in North America. To quote a Canadian Honda representative in 2004: "There will definitely be less than one per dealer." The original idea was to collect consumer's feedback on the limited production Rune in preparation for an upcoming commercially viable model to be released in the following year.

This model was produced at the Honda motorcycle plant in Marysville, Ohio.

=== EVO6 concept ===
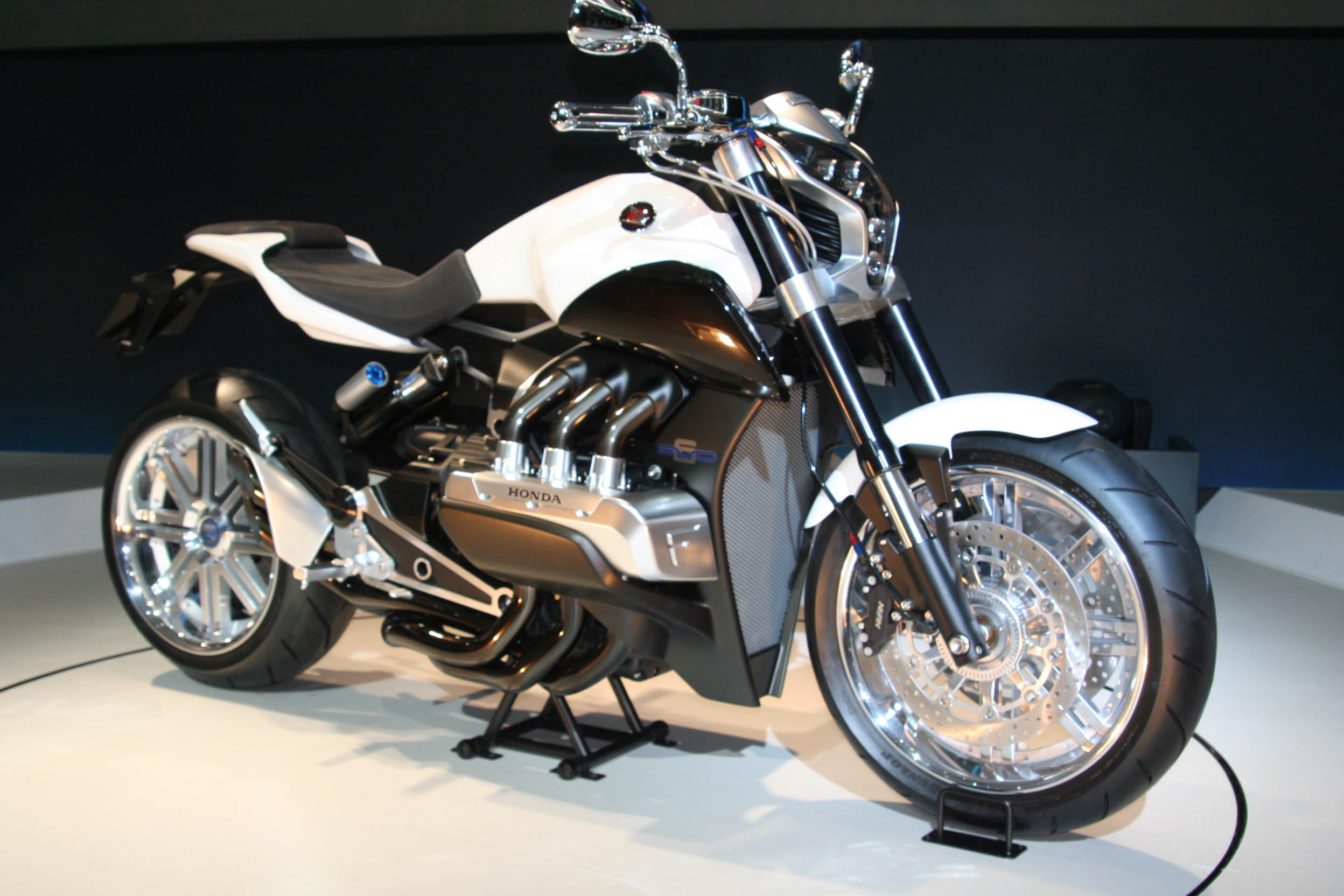
EVO6 at the 2007 Tokyo Motor Show

Honda presented the EVO6 concept motorcycle at the Tokyo Motor Show 2007. Based on the flat-six 1,832 cubic centimetres (111.8 cu in) engine from the Goldwing, the EVO6 produces more power than its touring ancestor. The EVO6 features Honda's Human Friendly Transmission (HFT) that can be operated in a fully automatic mode or a six-speed manual mode.

=== Reintroduction ===
The Valkyrie was reintroduced in November 2013 (as a 2014 model) as a redesign of the GL1800 Gold Wing.

The reintroduced Valkyrie (NRX1800) shared the same liquid cooled 1832cc flat six engine (117 bhp at 5,500 rpm/123 lb.-ft. torque at 4,000 rpm) as well as underlying frame and 5-speed transmission as the Honda Goldwing. However the Valkyrie loses the fairing, windshield and bags (windshield and bags are available Honda optional accessories). ABS is also available (not standard). The Valkyrie has an all digital multi-instrument dash screen.

At the Tokyo Motor Show, Honda revealed their new 'naked' version of the GL1800, as the 2014 Valkyrie, using the same 1832cc six-cylinder engine as the Gold Wing but weighing 70 kg (150 lb) less. The new Valkyrie has increased rake and trail, front and rear suspension revised for the reduced weight, 50/50 weight distribution and large tires after the fashion of sport-bikes. The Valkyrie's horsepower-to-weight ratio puts it in the muscle bike class according to some reviewers. It was expected to be on sale in early 2014, priced at about $17,000 for the base model (the model with an anti-lock braking system will cost more). The reintroduced Valkyrie was only available for two model years (2014 and 2015) before Honda dropped the bike in the US market.
