= Josef Boyd =

American engineer

Josef A. Boyd
- Died: Rosamond, California
- Occupation: Senior Engineer, Motorcycle Division, Honda R&D Americas, Inc.
- Known for: Honda R&D Americas, Inc., Honda Valkyrie

Josef A. Boyd (October 20, 1948 – May 27, 1998) was an American engineer employed by Honda R&D Americas in Torrance, California. He died in an accident involving another Honda employee, Dirk Vandenberg, while they were evaluating a pre-production version of the Honda CBR600F4 motorcycle. At the time of the accident, Boyd was apparently photographing the motorcycle being ridden by Vandenberg at Willow Springs Raceway in Rosamond, California. Vandenberg also died in the accident.

== Dedications ==
Following his death, the words, "Dedicated to Super Evaluators Dirk Vandenberg and Josef Boyd", were embossed in raised letters on the inside of the Honda CBR600F4's upper fairing.

Canadian motorcycle racer Miguel Duhamel dedicated his May 30, 1998, AMA Superbike race win at Road Atlanta to Josef Boyd and Dirk Vandenberg.

== Valkyrie ==
Josef A. Boyd, aka GL Joe, was considered the "father" of the GL1500C Valkyrie F6C motorcycle, which was a "cruiser" derivation of the Honda Gold Wing.
