= Honda NC700 =

Honda NC700 series
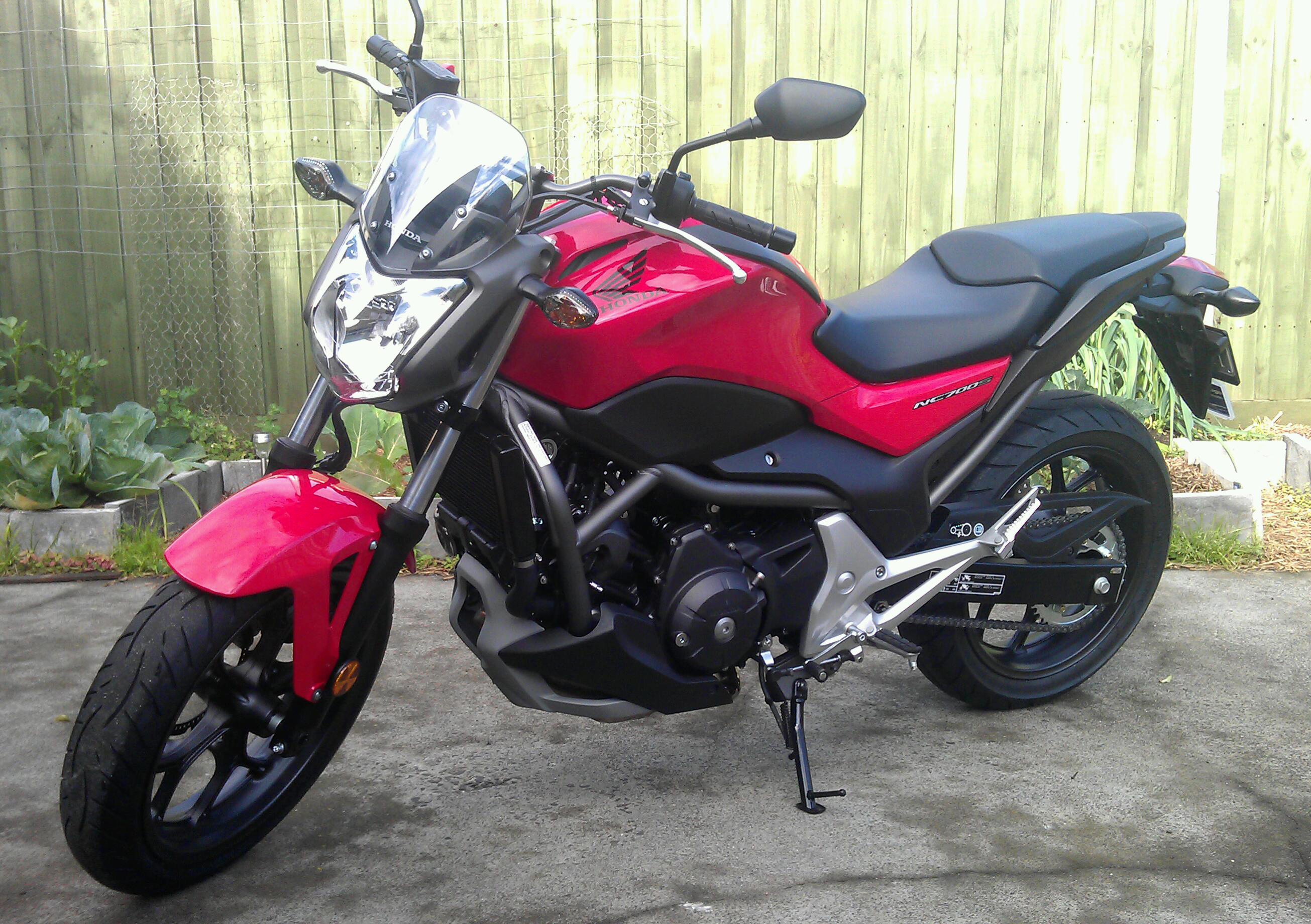
- 2012 NC700SA
- Manufacturer: Honda Motor Company
- Production: 2012—
- Assembly: Japan
- Class: Standard
- Engine: Honda RC61 670 cc (41 cu in) SOHC parallel-twin, 4-stroke, 4 valves per cylinder, liquid-cooled
- Bore / stroke: 73 mm × 80 mm (2.9 in × 3.1 in)
- Compression ratio: 10.7:1
- Power: 35 and 40.3 kW (46.9 and 54.0 hp) @ 6,250 rpm
- Torque: 83.2 and 87.1 N⋅m (61.4 and 64.2 lb⋅ft) @ 4,750 rpm
- Ignition type: Electronic
- Transmission: 6-speed
- Frame type: Rigid tube steel diamond
- Suspension: 41 mm (1.6 in) telescopic forks, 120 mm (4.7 in) travel
- Brakes: 320 mm (13 in) single wavy hydraulic disc with 3-piston calipers and sintered metal pads (front), 240 mm (9.4 in) single wavy hydraulic disc with single-piston caliper and sintered metal pads (rear)
- Tires: 120/70-ZR17M/C (58W) front, 160/60-ZR17M/C (69W) rear
- Wheelbase: 1,525 mm (60.0 in)
- Dimensions: L: 2,195 mm (86.4 in); W: 760 mm (30 in); H: 1,130 mm (44 in)
- Seat height: 790 mm (31 in) (S); 830 mm (33 in) (X); 800 mm (31 in) (X Type LD - JDM )
- Weight: 211 kg (465 lb)(NC700S); 215 kg (474 lb)(NC700SA); 218 kg (481 lb)(NC700X); 225 kg (496 lb)(NC700SD) (wet)
- Fuel capacity: 14.1 L (3.1 imp gal; 3.7 US gal)
- Fuel consumption: 3.58 L/100 km (79 mpg_{‑imp}; 65.7 mpg_{‑US}) (claimed)
- Turning radius: 3.0 m (9.8 ft)
- Related: Honda NM4

The Honda NC700 series is a family of motorcycles produced by Honda since 2012. NC700 series was a 'new concept', being (unlike conventional motorcycles) a bike designed for commuters, new or veteran riders. The series also includes the motorcycle/scooter hybrid NC700D Integra. The NC700 series is classed as a commuter model bike which has incorporated design and mechanical elements from various motorcycle types. The riding position is similar to standard bike styles. The traditional fuel tank location conceals a helmet-sized storage compartment. The fuel tank is under the seat. The series is often marketed as fun to ride, easy to handle and very fuel efficient.

== Models & variants ==
=== NC700S ===
Basic model with naked bike styling. The NC700SA model is also available with the addition of a combined antilock braking system. The NC700SD has a dual-clutch transmission, which allows the rider to switch between manual gear shifts or automatic shifts.

=== NC700X ===
Styling of NC700X has reference to road and dual-sport motorcycles. It was released in late 2011 in Europe. The NC700XA model adds the combined antilock braking system. The NC700XD has a dual-clutch transmission, which allows the rider to switch between manual gear shifts or automatic shifts. Cycle World chose the NC700X as "Best Standard Motorcycle" for 2012.

=== NC750S and NC750X ===
In Europe, Australia and Canada, 745 cc variants are available as the NC750S and NC750X from 2014 model year onward, with slightly larger 77 mm cylinder bore producing 40.3 kilowatts (54.0 hp). Torque is 68Nm.

For 2016 model year, NC750S and NC750X went through a facelift which introduced LED headlight and taillight, new EU4 compliant exhaust pipe, new dashboard, and various other changes. DCT models, also got updated DCT software with 3 level S mode.

For 2018 model year, NC750X variant gets traction control as a standard equipment. The NC750X was introduced to the US for the 2018 Model Year, available in DCT and conventional transmission.

For 2021 model year, power increased by 4 to 57.8bhp, additional 600 r.p.m. to redline, Euro 5 compliant, slipper clutch, reduced weight 6kg, *chassis lowered 30mm, ride by wire throttle, 4 ride modes, including a user configurable mode.

=== NC700D, NC750D Integra, and X-ADV Scooters ===
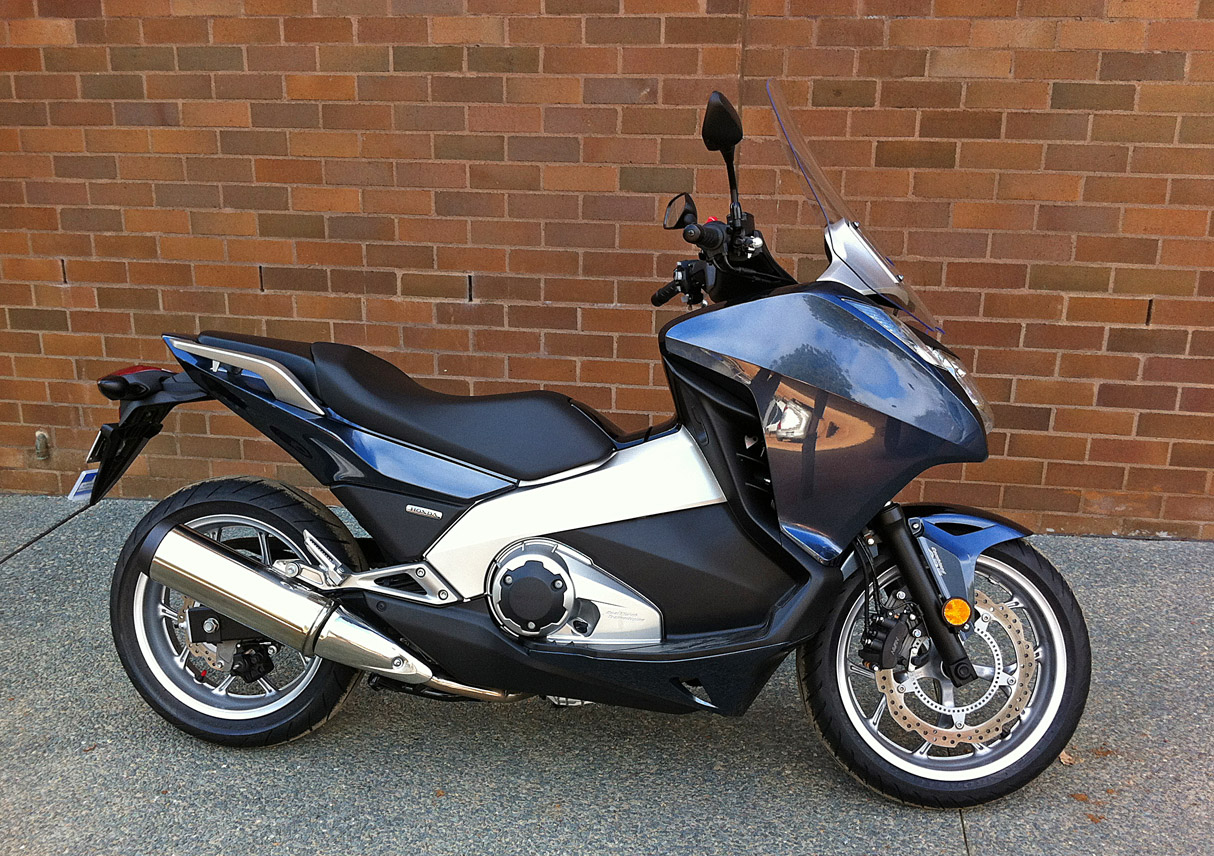
Integra 750

The NC700D Integra is a DCT motorcycle/scooter hybrid made by Honda since 2012. In Europe it is sold as the NC750D with the larger 745 cc engine.

=== CTX700 and CTX700N ===
The CTX700 has cruiser-style forward placed footpegs, wide handlebars, and a fairing; the CTX700N is a "naked" with just a small fairing around the headlamp. Both versions came in a "D" variant that included both Honda's automatic Dual Clutch Transmission (DCT) and anti-lock brakes (ABS).

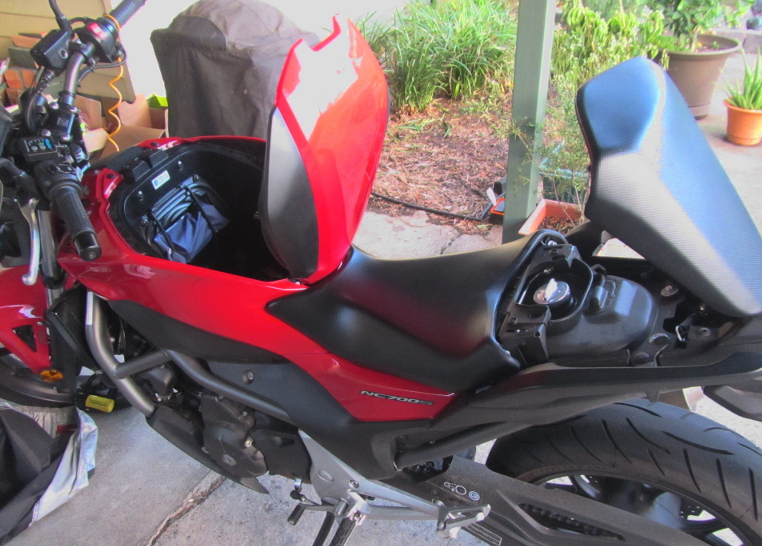
The storage compartment and under seat fuel tank of a NC700SA

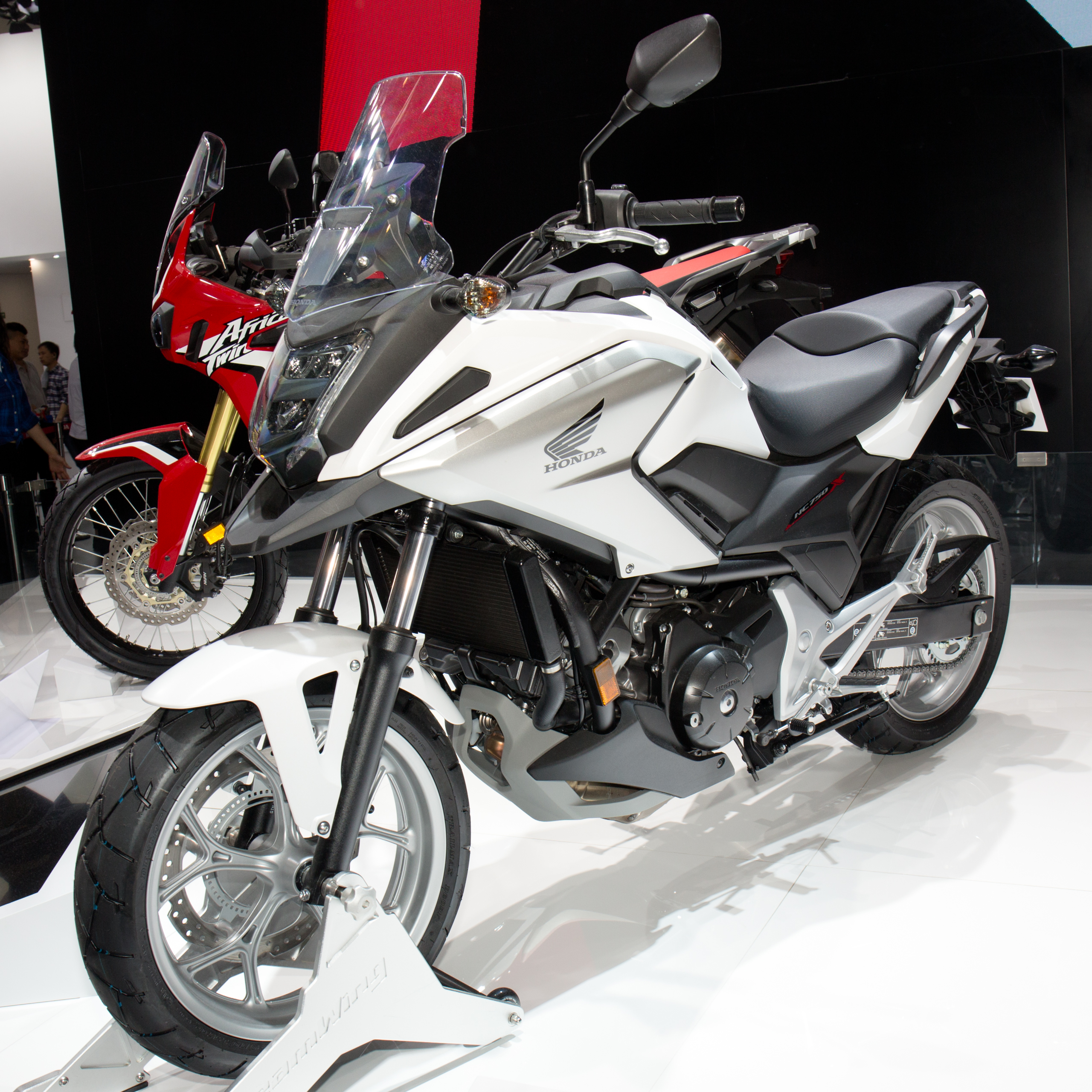
NC750X at the 2016 Auto China

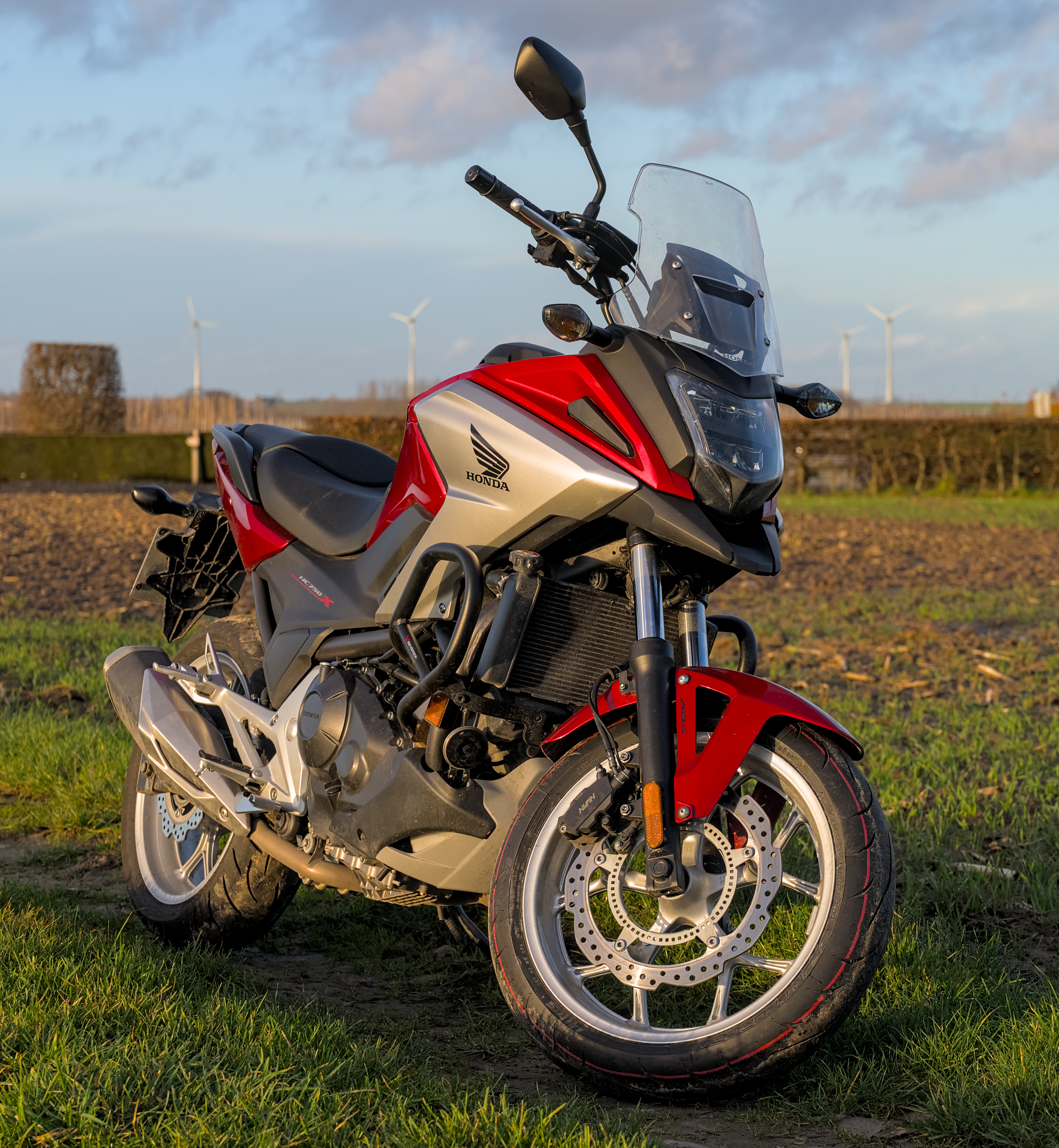
2018 Honda NC750X

=== NM4 NC700J, NC700JD and NC750JD Vultus ===
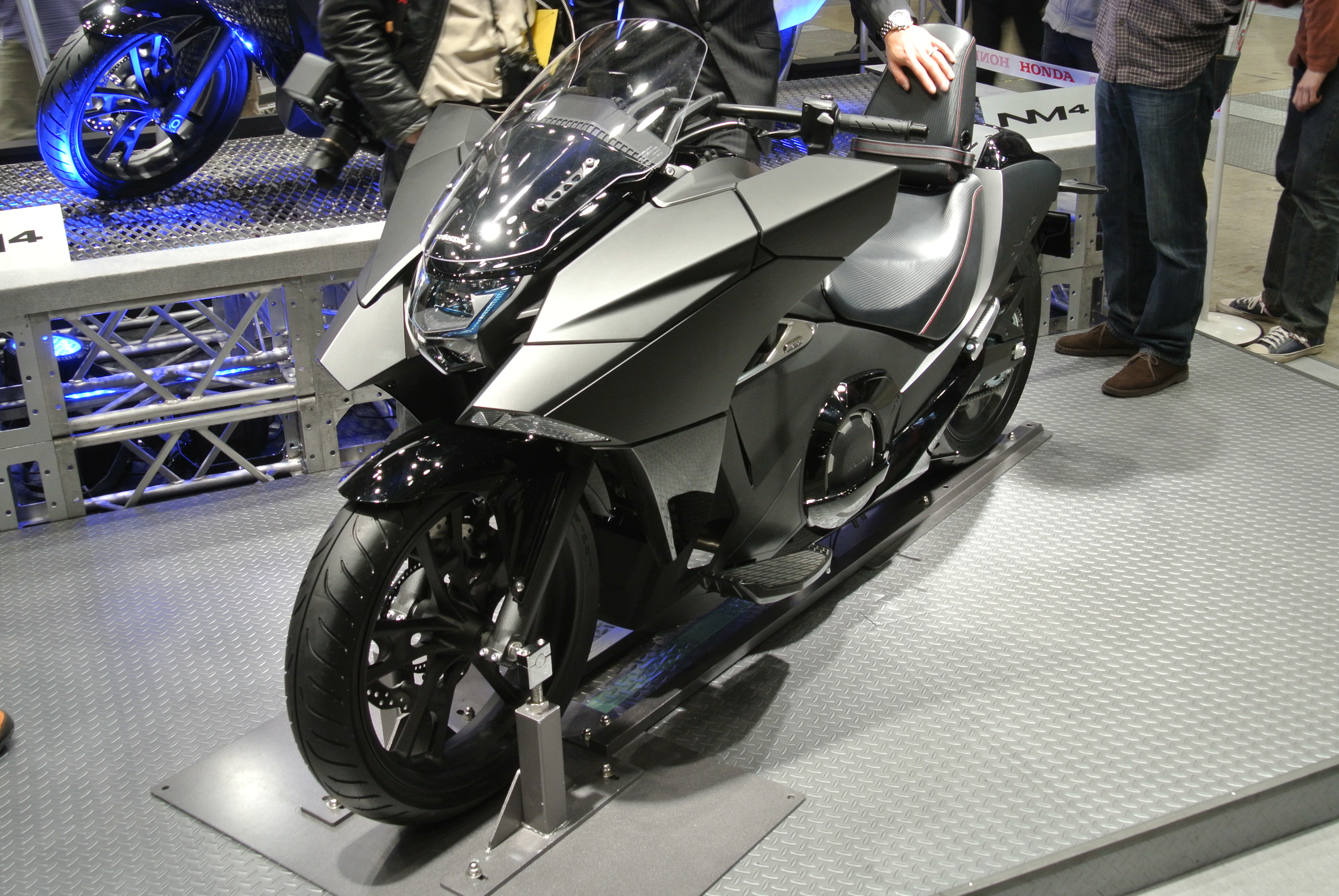
Honda NM4

The NM4 NC700J and NC700JD has futuristic manga-style design and feet-forward foot position, with flat boards instead of footpegs. It has been compared to the Akira motorcycle, Batmobile, and Darth Vader in its styling. It debuted at London ComicCon in 2014.

The UK NM4-01 which was the only officially imported variant (without built in panniers) unlike the US version features the larger 750cc engine variant and was generally marketed as the NM4 *New Motorcycle 4 "Vultus"" which is Latin for "a face expression, look, countenance"

Limited runs were made, for model years 2015 and 2018.

NM4-02 variant comes with panniers, NM4-01 had no panniers, but they were available as an upgrade kit.

Some markets received only NM4-02 (notably North America) and some received only NM4-01 (notably UK).

NM4 was offered only in black in some markets (e.g. North America) and in many colors in other markets (Asia).

== Engine ==
The NC700 series is powered by a single overhead camshaft 670 cc (41 cu in) parallel-twin engine that is tilted 62˚ forward to provide a low centre of gravity, with near uniform weight distribution. The undersquare engine has programmed fuel injection, separate timing profiles for each cylinder, and is tuned to deliver powerful torque in the low- to mid-speed range. The engine was designed to deliver a "pleasant throbbing feel" of a V-twin through the use of a 270° crank, which Honda "deliberately designed with a uniaxial primary balancer" even though the primary vibration of the crankshaft could have been balanced perfectly using a biaxial balance shaft. The fuel consumption figure of 3.58 L/100 km (79 mpg_{‑imp}; 65.7 mpg_{‑US}) has been attributed to the low number of moving parts in the engine – the oil pump is driven by the balance shaft, while the camshaft also drives the water pump. The design also resulted in water hoses that were 30% shorter. The pistons are resin-coated and lightweight aluminum material is used for the friction-reducing roller rocker arm.

== Transmission ==
The NC700X, NC750X, NC700S and NC700SA come with a six-speed manual gearbox while the Integra, the NC700SD, NC700XD and the NC750XD come standard with a second generation of the six-speed dual-clutch transmission first used on the Honda VFR1200F. The version used on the Integra and NC700SD is lighter and more compact due to a simplified hydraulic circuit; a learning function has also been added to each of the drive modes to detect a variety of riding environments. The system uses heavy duty large-diameter clutches to deal with the rigours of use in stop/start city traffic.

Drive mode on the transmission puts an emphasis on fuel economy by staying in as high a gear as possible as often as possible, keeping engine speeds low, between 2,000 and 2,500 rpm for steady speed cruising such as on freeways, while selecting Sport mode keeps the engine running at higher rpm as often as possible in order to supply more immediate power in situations where spooling the engine would be a hindrance.
