= Honda X-ADV =

Honda X-ADV 750
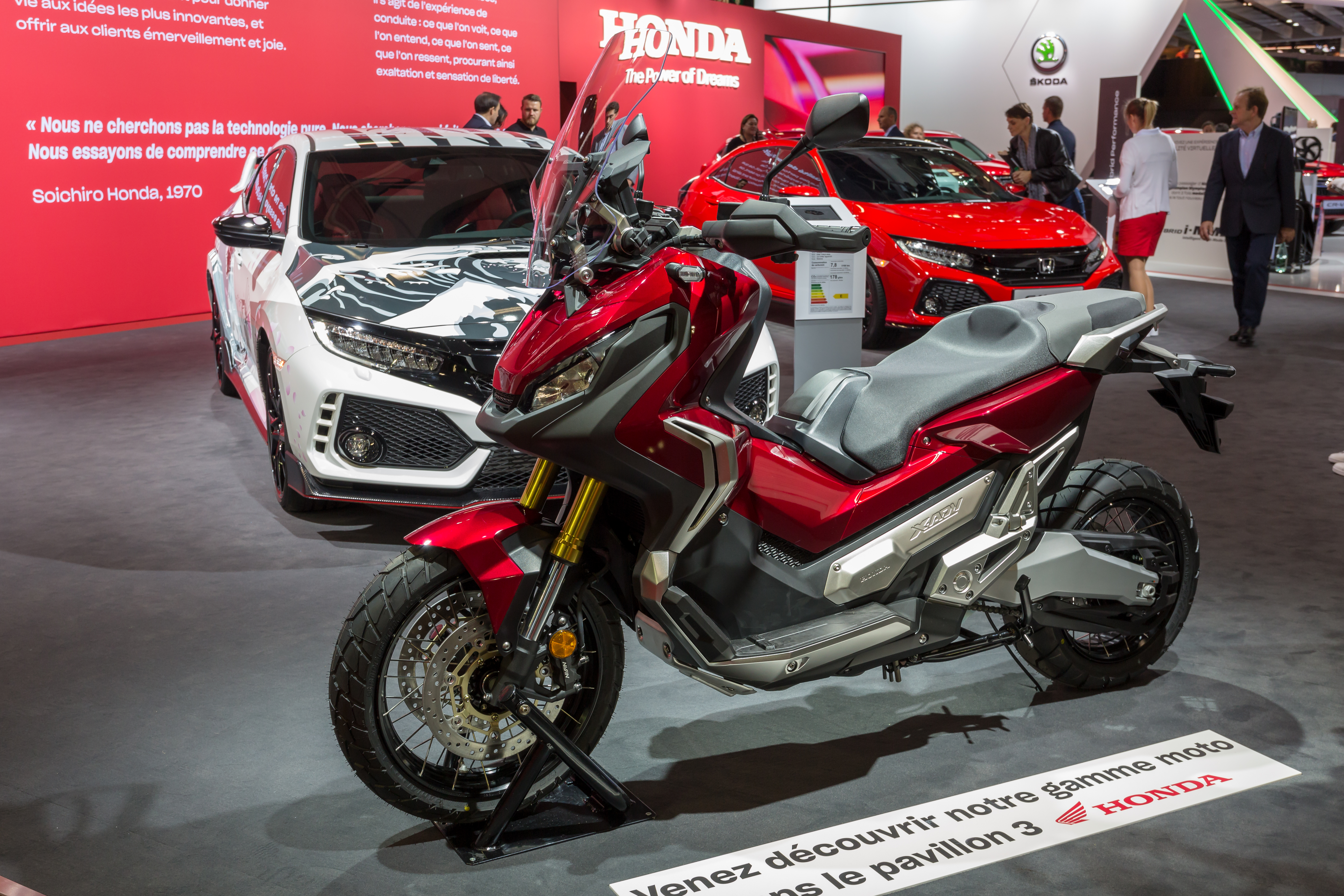
- Honda X-ADV at the 2018 Paris Motor Show
- Manufacturer: Honda Motor Co., Ltd.
- Production: 2017–present
- Predecessor: Integra 750
- Class: Crossover / Maxi-scooter / Adventure scooter
- Engine: Liquid-cooled 4-stroke, SOHC parallel twin, 8 valves, 745 cc
- Bore / stroke: 77 × 80 mm
- Compression ratio: 10.7 : 1
- Top speed: 168 km/h
- Power: 43.1 kW (≈ 57.8 hp) @ 6,750 rpm
- Torque: 69 Nm @ 4,750 rpm
- Transmission: 6-speed Dual Clutch Transmission (DCT)
- Frame type: Steel diamond frame
- Suspension: Front: 41 mm USD fork, ~153 mm travel; Rear: Pro-Link monoshock, ~150 mm travel
- Brakes: Front: dual 296 mm discs, 4-piston radial; Rear: single 240 mm disc, ABS
- Tires: Front: 120/70-R17; Rear: 160/60-R15
- Wheelbase: 1,590 mm
- Dimensions: L: 2,215 mm W: 940 mm H: 1,370 mm
- Seat height: 820 mm
- Weight: 236–237 kg (wet)
- Fuel capacity: 13.2 L
- Related: Honda NC750, Honda Forza 750

Honda X-ADV 750 (often just X-ADV) is a crossover / maxi-scooter produced by Honda since 2017. It combines scooter-style convenience with motorcycle-like chassis and off-road / adventure styling.

== History ==
The X-ADV was first unveiled at EICMA 2016, with production starting in 2017. Subsequent model years added features such as Honda Selectable Torque Control (HSTC), multiple riding modes, upgraded TFT instrumentation, and licence-restricted A2 variants.

== Design and Features ==
The X-ADV uses a steel diamond frame and a liquid-cooled 745 cc SOHC parallel-twin engine. It is paired with a six-speed Dual Clutch Transmission (DCT) that can be used in fully automatic or manual-shift modes.

Suspension consists of a 41 mm USD fork at the front and a Pro-Link rear swingarm with long-travel monoshock. Wire-spoked wheels (17-inch front, 15-inch rear) with dual front disc brakes and a single rear disc are standard, supported by two-channel ABS.

Additional features include:

- 5-inch colour TFT display with smartphone connectivity.
- LED lighting and an adjustable windscreen.
- Smart Key system and multiple riding modes (Standard, Rain, Sport, Gravel, User).

== Performance ==
Power output is around 43.1 kW (57.8 hp) at 6,750 rpm, with peak torque of 69 Nm at 4,750 rpm. Fuel consumption is rated at approximately 3.6 L/100 km under WMTC. Top speed is estimated at 168 km/h.

== Market and Variants ==
A 35 kW restricted version is available in Europe for A2 licence holders. Honda also markets accessory packs (Adventure, Style, Travel) to enhance touring or off-road performance.

== Reception ==
The X-ADV has been praised for blending scooter practicality with adventure styling, though some reviewers note its relatively high weight and cost compared to conventional scooters.

== Specifications ==
Technical specifications
Parameter	Value
Engine	Liquid-cooled SOHC parallel twin, 8 valves, 745 cc
Bore × Stroke	77 × 80 mm
Compression	10.7 : 1
Power	43.1 kW @ 6,750 rpm
Torque	69 Nm @ 4,750 rpm
Transmission	6-speed DCT
Front suspension	41 mm USD fork, ~153.5 mm travel
Rear suspension	Monoshock, Pro-Link, ~150 mm travel
Brakes	Dual 296 mm discs (front), 240 mm disc (rear), ABS
Wheels	17 in front, 15 in rear (spoke)
Dimensions (L×W×H)	2,215 × 940 × 1,370 mm
Wheelbase	1,590 mm
Seat height	820 mm
Ground clearance	165 mm
Weight	236–237 kg (kerb)
Fuel capacity	13.2 L
Consumption	3.6 L/100 km (WMTC)
Top speed	~168 km/h

== See also ==
- Honda NC750
- Honda Forza 750
- Maxi-scooter
- Adventure motorcycle
- Dual-clutch transmission
