= Human Friendly Transmission =

Animation illustrating the principle of a Swashplate engine

The Human Friendly Transmission is the marketing name of a proprietary continuously variable transmission (CVT) made by Honda for its motorcycles, including the Honda DN-01 and EVO6 concept motorcycle.

The electronically controlled automatic transmission system is unlike more familiar belt-driven CVT systems used on scooters, nor does it have a torque converter, typical of automotive applications. Instead it is a hydrostatic drive that employs a variable displacement axial piston pump with a variable-angle swashplate. Prior to the DN-01, this type of system had not been used in road-going consumer motor vehicles, though it is familiar in industrial applications and heavy equipment such as forklifts and the US Air Force's MJ-1 bomb lift truck, in use since the 1950s. Honda has also dabbled in this technology since the 1950s. It appeared on their 2001 FourTrax Rubicon 4-wheel, off-road ATV.

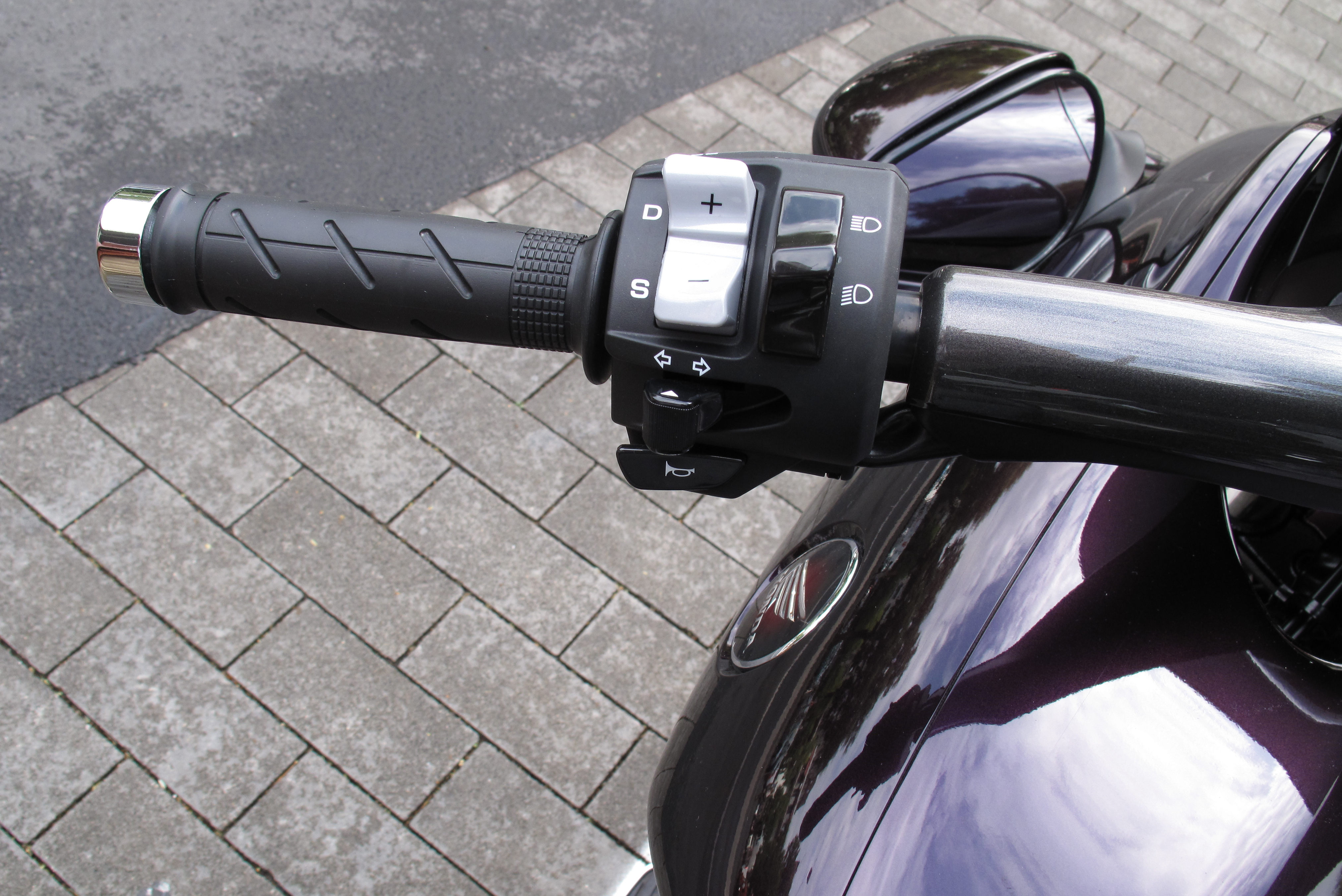
Honda DN-01 transmission controls

The electronic controls allow the motorcycle to be operated in three modes: Drive, Sport and Manual. In Drive and Sport, it functions much like a CVT scooter, with infinitely variable gearing upshifted and downshifted automatically for what the system determines to be optimal performance. Unlike a scooter, engine braking is always available when decelerating. The difference between Drive and Sport modes is that Drive is optimized for economy while Sport is more responsive. In Manual mode, the transmission operates in one of six discrete gears chosen by the rider by pushing a plus/minus button on the left handlebar. It feels much like a normal motorcycle, including hitting the rev limiter at the top of each gear, but the electronic control unit (ECU) prevents upshifting and downshifting too soon. In all modes, it automatically returns to the lowest gear when stopped. It is also possible to switch into neutral while stopped, unlike a scooter.
