= Honda DN-01 =

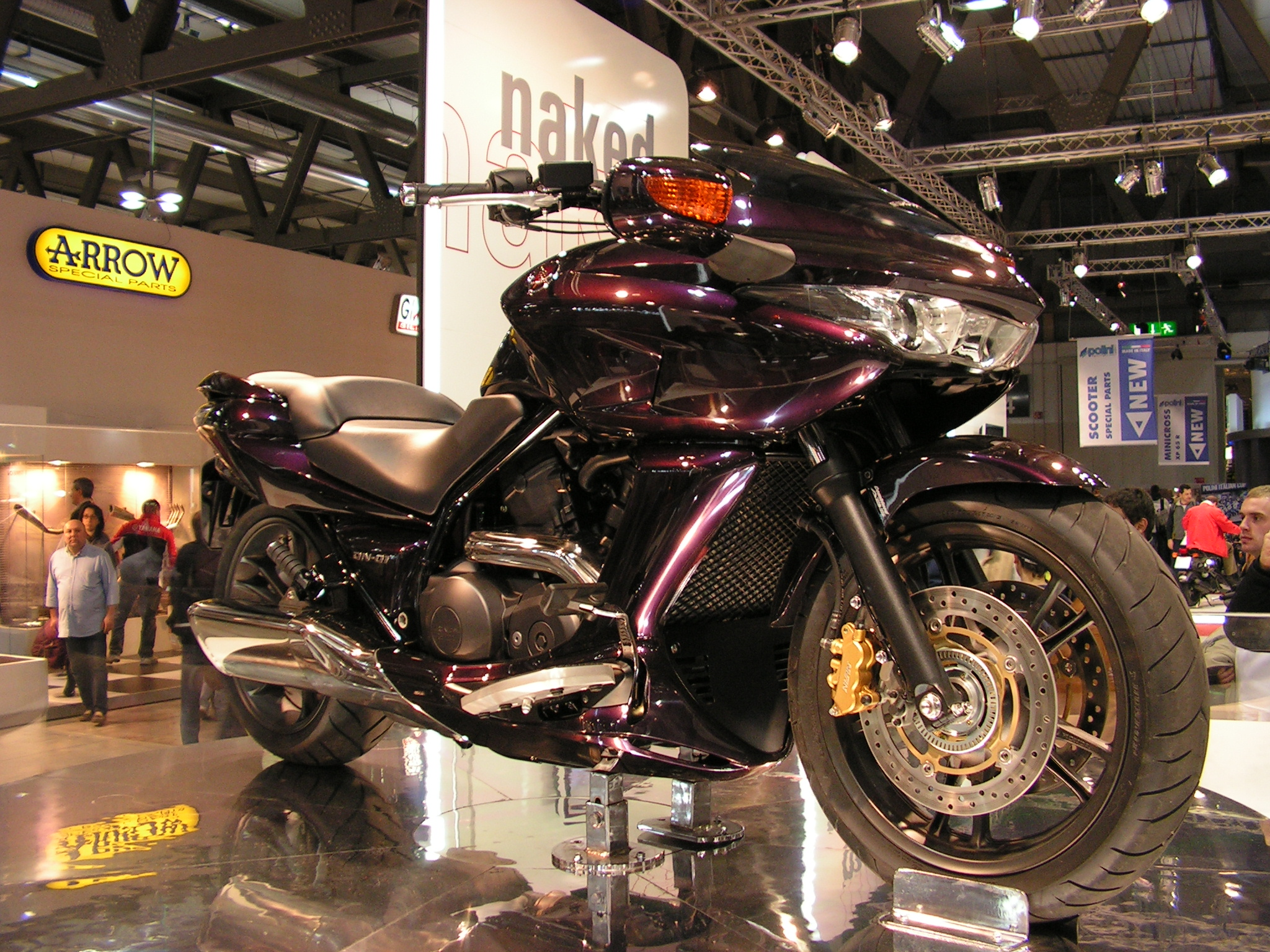
- Manufacturer: Honda
- Production: 2008–2010
- Class: Cruiser, or a crossover of cruiser, sportbike and scooter categories
- Engine: Liquid-cooled 680 cc 52-degree V-twin, chain-driven SOHC, 4 valves per cylinder, with programmed fuel injection
- Bore / stroke: 81 mm × 66 mm (3.2 in × 2.6 in)
- Compression ratio: 10.0:1
- Top speed: 113.1 mph (182.0 km/h)
- Power: 43.3 hp (32.3 kW) @ 7300 rpm 45.6 hp (34.0 kW)@ 7300 rpm
- Transmission: Continuously variable, hydro-mechanical two-mode automatic with six-speed manual mode
- Suspension: Front: 41 mm telescopic fork; 101 mm (4.0 in) travel R: Aluminum single-sided swingarm; monoshock with preload adjustment, 120 mm (4.7 in) travel
- Brakes: F: Dual hydraulic 296 mm triple-piston disc R: Hydraulic 276 mm dual-piston disc Combined Braking System with ABS
- Tires: Front: 120/70 ZR17 on 3.50" x 17" wheels Rear: 190/50 ZR17 on 6.00" x 17" wheels
- Rake, trail: 28.5° 4.5 in (110 mm)
- Wheelbase: 1,609 mm (63.3 in)
- Dimensions: L: 72.0 in (1,830 mm); H: 40.0 in (1,020 mm)
- Seat height: 713 mm (28.1 in)
- Weight: 591 lb (268 kg) (dry); 602.5 lb (273.3 kg); 595 lb (270 kg) (claimed) (wet)
- Fuel capacity: 15.3 L (3.4 imp gal; 4.0 US gal)
- Oil capacity: 4 L (1.1 US gal)
- Fuel consumption: 42.3 mpg_{‑US} (5.56 L/100 km); 48 mpg_{‑US} (4.9 L/100 km)
- Turning radius: 3.2 m (10 ft)

The Honda DN-01 is a cruiser motorcycle made by Honda from 2008 to 2010. It was introduced at the 2005 Tokyo Motor Show and went on sale in Japan and Europe in 2008, in the United States in 2009, and was discontinued at the end of 2010. It was one of a small number of motorcycles offered by a major motorcycle manufacturer with an automatic transmission.

== About ==
The 2009 model DN-01, measured by Motorcycle Consumer News, does 0 to 60 mph (0 to 97 km/h) in 7.41 seconds, a 1/4-mile time of 15.41 seconds at 87.42 mph (140.69 km/h), and a top speed of 113.1 mph (182.0 km/h). Braking performance, which uses an anti-lock braking system on the front dual disc brakes, is 60 to 0 mph (97 to 0 km/h) in 124 ft (38 m). The DN-01 has automatic continuously variable transmission (CVT) technology.

Reviewer complaints focused on ergonomics, especially potentially uncomfortable seating on long rides, and the lack of wind protection at high speed. There is also no storage space at all, and the price of US$14,599 was much higher than any comparably performing machine. Since the initial reviews, the price rose to US$15,599. The load capacity is only 324 lb (147 kg), meaning that with a passenger the DN-01 is likely to become overloaded if touring were attempted. Ultimate MotorCycling, like other reviewers, was fascinated with the transmission technology but found the combination of styles and features unsatisfactory from the point of view of either a cruiser rider or sportbike rider, while the lack of storage fails to meet the needs of either touring riders or the urban commuter scooter buyer.

The DN-01 has a catalyst system compliant with EURO-3, California Air Resources Board (CARB) and EPA emissions standards.

== Transmission ==
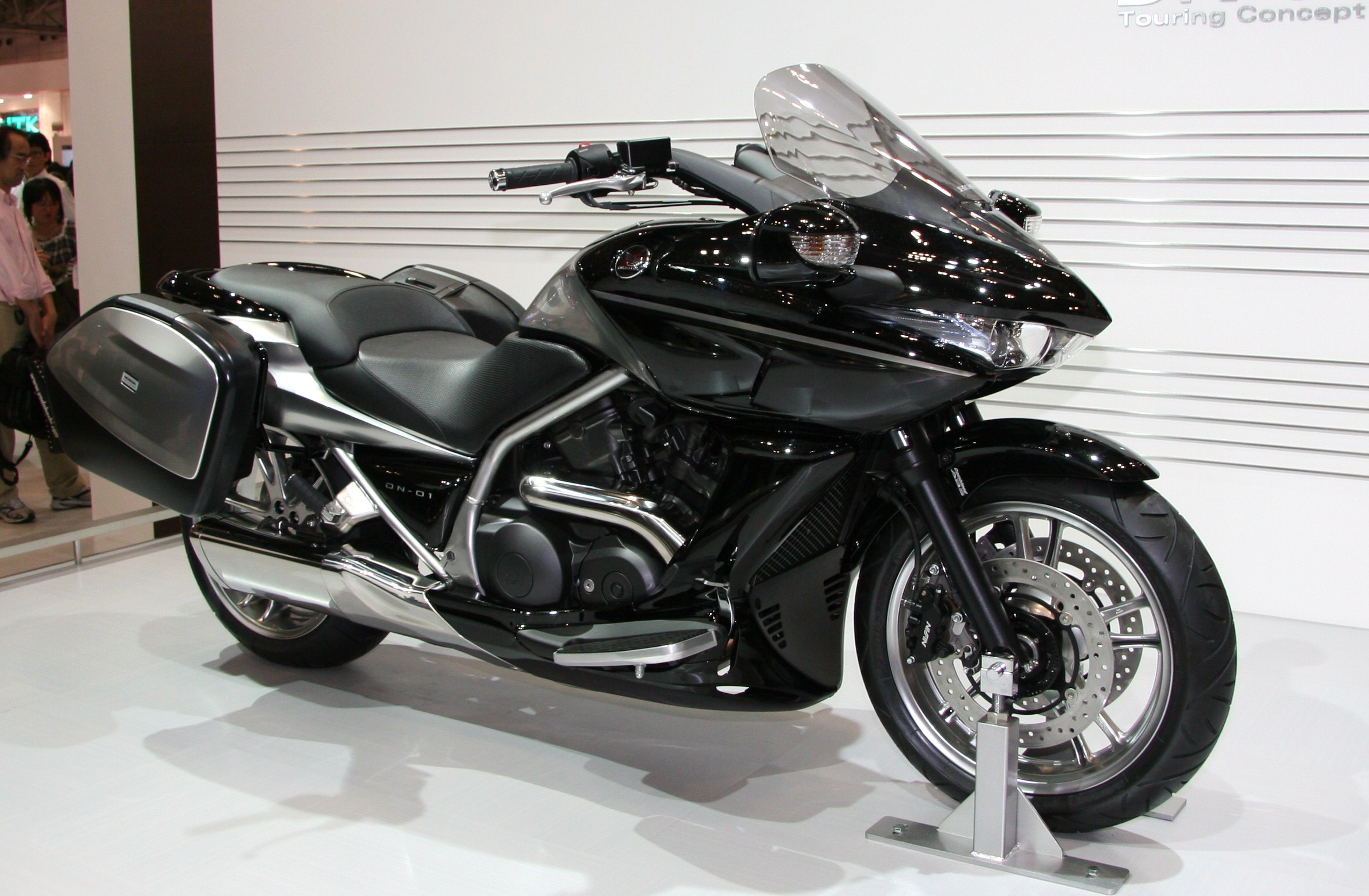
DN-01 touring concept at the 2009 Tokyo Motor Show

The DN-01 uses a continuously variable transmission, marketed by Honda as the Human Friendly Transmission, allowing either manual selection of a "gear" or automatic operation much like a CVT scooter, with continuously variable transmission ratios selected automatically by the system's controller for optimal performance.

== See also ==
- Swashplate engine
