= Faceplate =

Faceplate (face plate, face-plate) is a plate, cover, or bezel on the front of a device, such as:

== Computers and electronics ==
- Electrical outlet, also referred to as a wall plate, outlet cover, or socket cover
- Front panel, of computers
- Head unit, stereo system component
- Motherboard, input/output port panel such as on an ATX
- Cover (container)
- Faceplate (housing), decorative elements of housing
  - Nokia 5110, mobile phone with interchangeable faceplates
  - Interchangeable bezels for Game Boy Micro
  - Interchangeable bezels for Nintendo 3DS
  - Interchangeable bezels for Nintendo 2DS
  - Interchangeable decorative front plates for Nintendo Wii Remote musical instrument controllers
  - Interchangeable decorative front plates for PlayStation 3 rhythm game peripherals
  - Interchangeable decorative front case panels for Xbox 360

== Underwater diving ==
- Single-lens diving mask or its viewport.
- Viewport on a diving helmet, also called a light on older helmets.

== Other uses ==
- Lathe faceplate, accessory for a wood or metal turning lathe
- Lockset, components that make up the locking or latching mechanism
- Stem (bicycle part), connects the handlebars to the steerer tube of the bicycle fork
- Wallpaper steamer, an electrical device which boils water continuously to produce steam

== See also ==
- Bezel (disambiguation)
- Cover (disambiguation)
- Instrument panel (disambiguation)
- Plate (disambiguation)
- Wallplate (disambiguation)
