= Headset (bicycle part) =

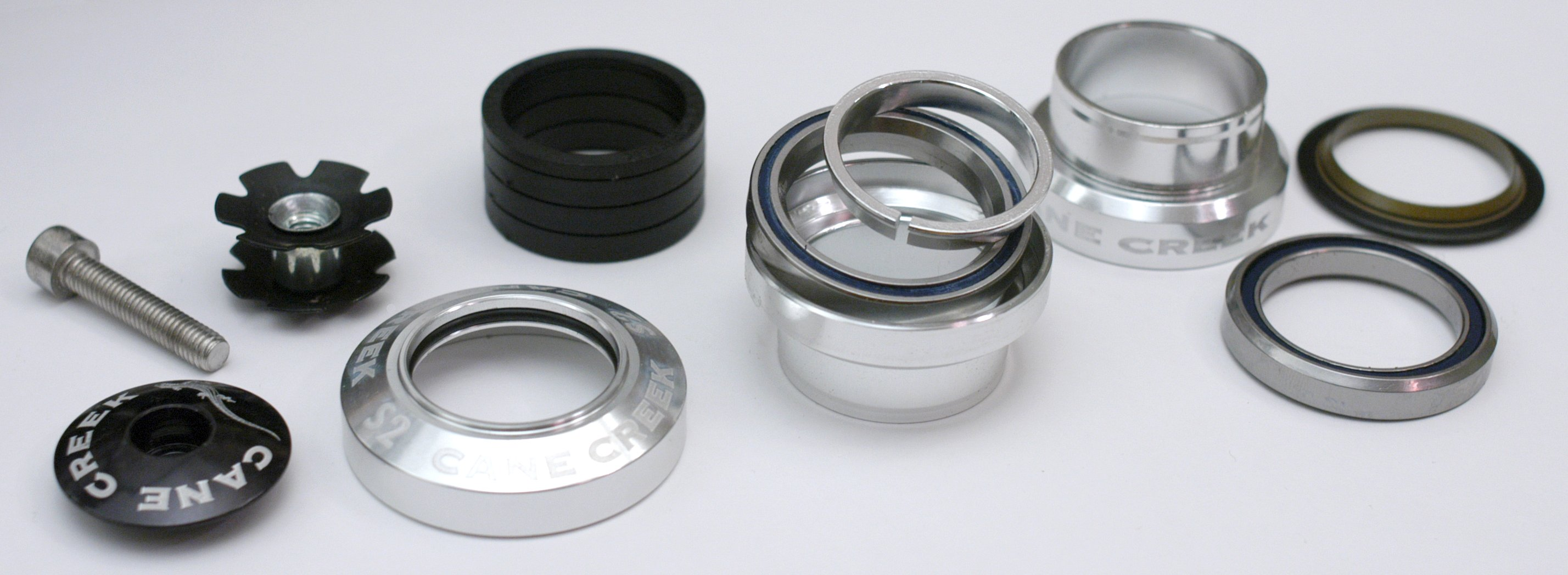
Parts of a threadless headset before installation

The headset is the set of components on a bicycle that provides a rotatable interface between the bicycle fork and the head tube of a bicycle frame. The tube through which the steerer of the fork passes is called the head tube. A typical headset consists of two cups that are pressed into the top and bottom of the headtube. Inside the two cups are bearings which provide a low friction contact between the bearing cup and the steerer.

== Sizes ==
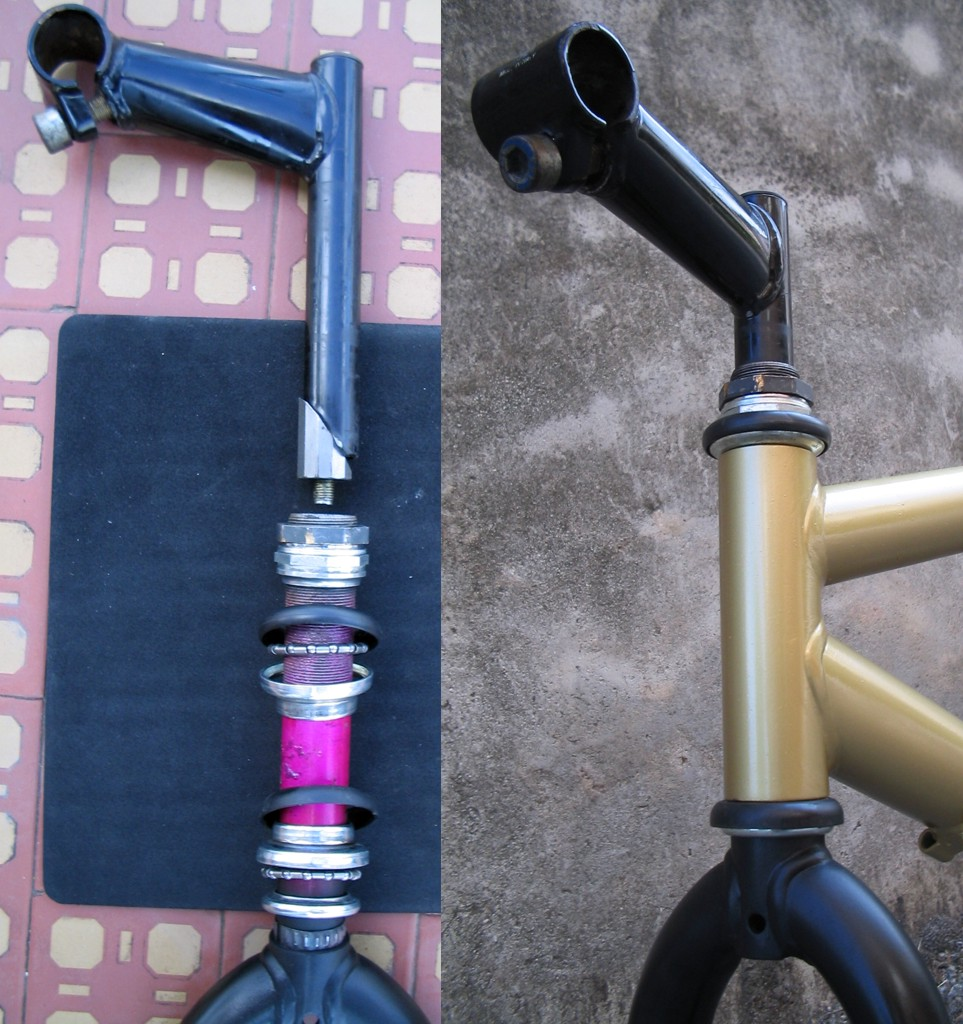
Threaded headset

Traditional bicycle head tubes and headsets are sized for a 25.4 mm (1 in) diameter steerer tube (also known as the fork column). Many frame and fork manufacturers are now building their parts around a steerer tube with a diameter of 28.6 mm (1 1/8 in). The larger diameter of the head tube and headset gives added stiffness to the steering portion of the bicycle.

Common sizes

- 25.4 mm (1 in) steerer tube, this may have a fork crown (the base of the fork steerer tube) of a number of different dimensions, and milling may be necessary to make some headsets fit.
  - 26.4 mm crown race (ISO standard)
  - 27.0 mm crown race (JIS standard)

Other steerer tube sizes are becoming common, more so all the time.

- 28.6 mm (1 1/8 in), originally branded Tioga "Avenger"
- 31.8 mm (1 1/4 in), originally branded Gary Fisher "Evolution"
- 38.1 mm (1 1/2 in), as used in the OnePointFive International Standard.
- Cannondale Headshok. Although a Headshok steerer is close to 38.1 mm (1 1/2 in) it is actually 39.7 mm (1 9/16 in). The headtube dimensions for 38.1 mm (1 1/2 in) and Headshok are very similar, differing only in the minimum press depth.
- 38.1 to 28.6 mm (1 1/2 to 1 1/8 in) "tapered" headsets (2009 onwards). The lower bearing is 38.1 mm (1 1/2 in) for increased stiffness and the upper is 28.6 mm (1 1/8 in) for reduced weight and to match existing stem interfaces.

The stack height of a headset is the total assembled height of the headset components and, in the case of a threadless system, the stem, discounting the tangs which press into the head tube and (in the case of threaded headsets) the thickness of the top seal of the locknut. The stack height of a frame and fork is the difference between the steerer tube length and the head tube length. Stack height is critical because a headset with a greater stack height than the frame and fork will not fit; the locknut will not thread on sufficiently (threaded) or there will be no room for the stem (threadless). If the headset has a lower stack height than the frame and fork, spacers are added to make up the difference.

== Types ==
There are a few different types of headset distinguishable by the way the bearings are held in place (with a lock nut or with a clamping stem), or by where they are located (inside or outside the head tube).

=== Threaded ===
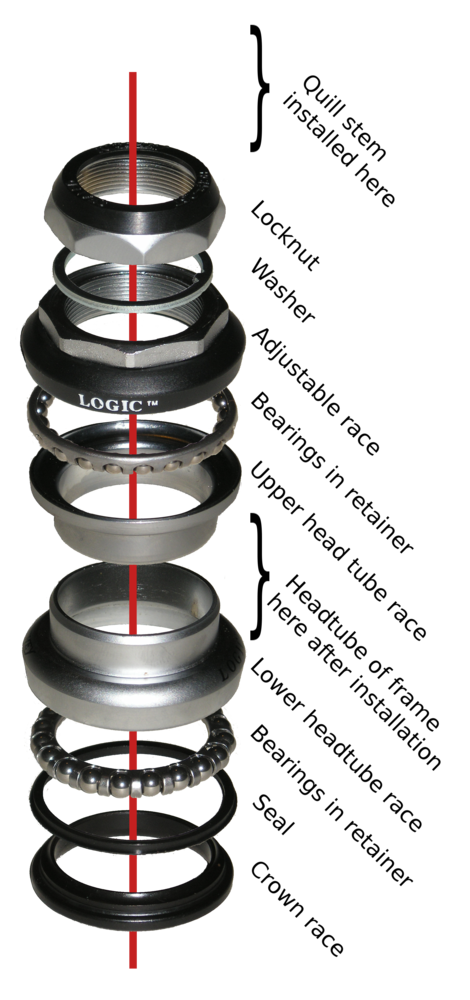
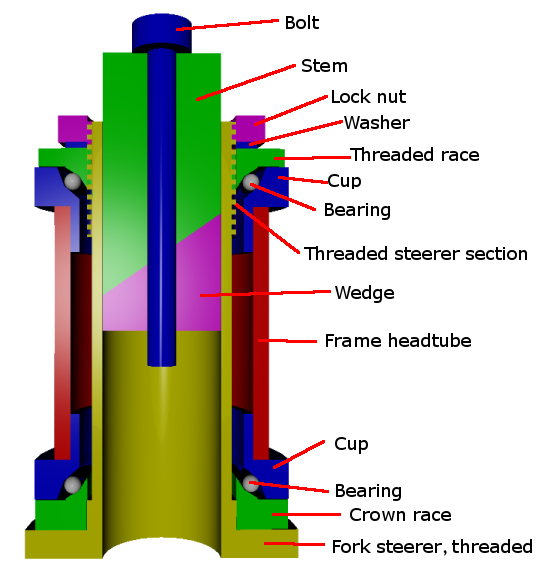
An exploded view of a 28.6 mm (1 1/8 in) loose ball bearing threaded headset

Threaded headset with internal bearings on 2016 Brodie Quantum bicycle

Threaded headsets are used with forks that have a threaded steerer tube and are the traditional type (as shown in the above picture). There are eight parts in a threaded headset (from bottom to top): crown race, lower bearings, lower frame cup (pictured as "lower head-tube race"), upper frame cup (pictured as "upper head-tube race"), upper bearings, upper race or cone, washer, locknut.

The order of installation of a typical headset follows. The steerer tube is cut to the appropriate length by the bicycle fork manufacturer and the top 25–51 mm (1–2 in) of the steerer is threaded using a rolling process. This process assures that no material is lost and the steerer would not be weakened as with a die or lathe cutting. Threaded forks necessitate that the threads on the steerer only use the top 25–51 mm (1–2 in), therefore the forks are sold in varying lengths. If there is a need to use a fork that is too long, meaning the fork steerer is not threaded down far enough, a bicycle mechanic can use a die to extend the threads. This is not recommended if the threads need to be cut farther than an inch or so. As a side note, one should never try to thread an unthreaded steerer after manufacturing as this will weaken the steerer tube. The threads are normally of the ISO standard 1″-24 TPI (25.4×1.058 mm), but other standards exist. The headtube may be faced and then the cups are pressed into the headtube using a special press that ensures they are square and true. The fork crown may be faced and then the crown race is pressed on to the fork crown with a special press that also makes sure that it is square and true. Then the bearings are placed on top of the crown race, after which the steerer tube is inserted into the headtube. The upper bearings are placed in the upper cup, and the upper race is screwed onto the steerer. A washer, frequently a keyed washer, is placed on top of the upper race and a locknut is screwed on top of that.

The adjustment of the headset to remove play is as follows: the upper race or cone is screwed down until it contacts the bearings in the upper cup. A slight preload is applied by turning the upper cone and additional 1/8 or 1/4 of a turn. The locknut is then tightened and the headset is checked for play and smooth operation. Readjustment takes place as necessary.

The stem, of the quill variety, is attached to the fork's steerer tube using an expander bolt which fits through the stem from the top with a wedge at the bottom, the stem fits inside the steerer tube and can be adjusted to the correct height without disturbing the headset. To free the stem for adjustment, undo the bolt on the top of the stem a couple of turns and give the bolt a sharp tap to disengage the wedge.

==== Internal ====
Like threadless headsets, threaded headsets can also be internal. Under the internal design, the races and cones are embedded into the head tube, creating a tidy, streamlined appearance. No component is visible between the fork crown and head tube except for perhaps a plastic ring, and only the locknut protrudes from the top of the head tube. In the image shown of the 2016 Brodie Quantum's steering assembly, the lock nut is hidden from view by a plastic cover. The widened top and bottom sections of the head tube contain the bearings. A quill stem inserts into the steering tube.

=== Threadless ===
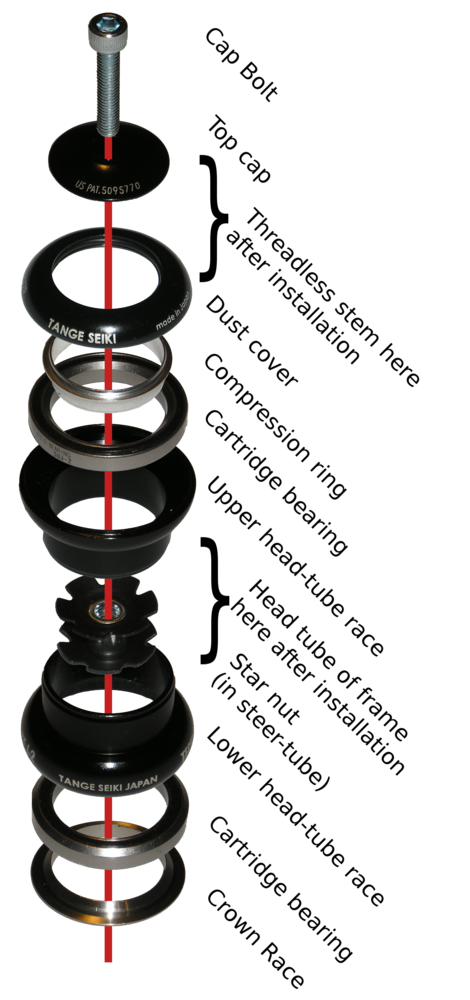
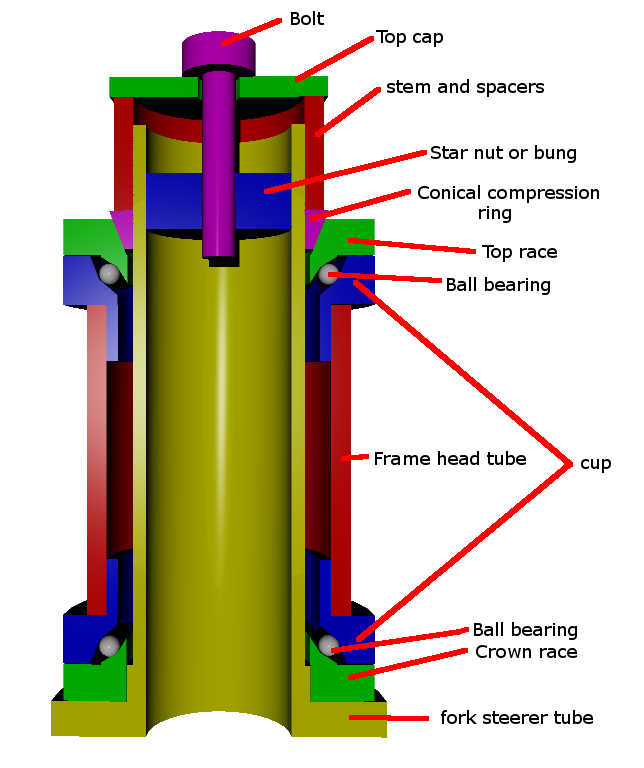
An exploded view of a 28.6 mm (1 1/8 in) cartridge bearing threadless headset

The threadless headset is a more recent design. U.S. Patent 5095770 is owned by Cane Creek Cycling Components and expired on September 29, 2010. Headsets of this type are often referred to by the Dia-Compe (now Cane Creek) registered trademark "Aheadset", and are manufactured under license. Like a traditional headset, it uses two sets of bearings and bearing cups. Unlike a threaded headset, a threadless headset does not have a threaded top headset race or use a threaded steerer tube. Instead the steerer tube extends from the fork all the way through the head tube and above the headset, and is held in place by the stem clamped on top.

Tightening a threadless headset requires tightening the preload bolt (or cap bolt) in the cap on the top of the stem. This bolt is connected to a star nut driven down into the steerer tube that acts as an anchor by gripping the inside of the steerer tube with a downward force. The star nut may be replaced by a self expanding wedge in some designs. The bolt compresses the stem down onto spacers, usually aluminum, which in turn compress the headset bearing cups. The preload bolt does not hold the fork onto the bike; after the preload is set, the stem bolts must be tightened to secure the fork in place. The adjustment must be made such that there is no play in the bearings, but allow the fork to turn smoothly without binding or excessive friction.

In the threadless headset system, the spacers are important in placing the stem and preload bolt in the correct position on the steerer tube. Thus the stack height of the stem becomes important. The steerer tube of the fork must be cut to length such that it leaves at least enough of the steerer tube protruding above the headset for the stem to clamp on to; if the steerer tube is cut longer than the stem, then spacers are used to fill the gap between the stem and the conical compression washer. Bicycle racers seeking the greatest saddle-to-handlebar drop for better aerodynamics will often forego spacers and cut the steerer tube down to exactly match the headset bearing cup stack height plus the stem height.

Cutting the steerer tube to its minimum length prevents switching to a taller stem or to a headset cups with a higher stack height. Any increase in handlebar height after this cut requires purchasing a new fork, a stem with more angular rise (some stems can be turned over for greater height), or a special adapter that clamps onto the steerer tube and gives a higher clamping position for the original stem. In addition, many riders who may have less flexibility than a seasoned racer may wish to gain more height on the handlebars, reducing the saddle-to-handlebar drop and providing a more upright and comfortable riding position. If an owner simply wishes to replace the headset with one having a slightly larger stack height, it may be possible for a bike shop or framebuilder to mill or re-face the head tube to gain an extra 1-2 mm of stack height without having to replace the fork. Many threadless fork steerer tubes are cut longer than necessary to allow for adjustments and the steerer tube above the stem is stacked with spacers that can be moved above or below the stem to fine-tune the handlebar height. Often these spacers are aluminum or carbon fiber, but titanium spacers are also available.

==== Integrated bearing cups ====
A relatively recent development, integrated headsets do away with the upper and lower bearing cups on threadless headsets and instead seat the bearings directly against the head tube of the frame. Favored sometimes for their aesthetic appeal, integrated headsets reduce the number of parts involved in the headset assembly. Prominent standards for integrated headsets include Cane Creek's "IS" and Campagnolo's standard, which is nameless apart from the manufacturer name. Chris King, a leading headset manufacturer, offers a vehement argument against the implementation of integrated headsets. The basis of King's argument is that headtubes with bearing "seats" are far from being machined with reasonable precision. The headset cartridge bearings therefore sit somewhat loosely in the headtube of the bicycle (as opposed to being press fit). During use, the bearings, under thrust loads, will rock in their seats and will easily damage the softer frame material (often aluminum, although some titanium frames are manufactured for integrated headsets). Given enough damage to the frame, there would be no choice but to replace the frame, especially if the frame is made of an aluminum alloy (titanium and steel can potentially be repaired, but usually at great cost to the consumer). King also argues that the integrated headset is largely a cost-cutting measure for many of the larger bicycle manufacturers, since integrated headsets are somewhat cheaper and take less time to install.

==== Internal ====
Sometimes referred to as semi-integrated headsets, internal headsets include all of the parts of conventional threadless headsets, but locate the bearings inside the head tube, instead of outside. Unlike integrated headsets, internal headsets still employ cups between the bearings and the frame itself. Prominent standards in internal headsets include Chris King's InSet and Cane Creek's ZeroStack. These designs use a 44.0 mm internal headtube diameter.

=== Comparing threaded and threadless headsets ===
The threaded headset has recently been replaced by the threadless headset on better quality bicycles for several reasons:

- Forks with a threadless steerer tube are cheaper for manufacturers because they can be cut to size at the point of sale and the manufacturer can use the same forks on different frame sizes. By comparison, forks with a threaded steerer tube must be matched with a frame's headset tube length; therefore, bicycle manufacturers need to make or buy a different sized fork for each frame size.
- Regular allen wrenches can be used to adjust threadless headset bearings. By comparison, large, and relatively expensive, wrenches are required to adjust threaded headset bearings; their size generally precludes carrying them on the road.
- Threadless headsets and forks are quicker to install, saving manufacturing costs.
- A threadless headset and fork is marginally lighter than an equivalent threaded headset and fork.
- A threadless stem is more rigidly attached to the forks, giving improved rigidity at the handlebars.
- On bicycles which have not been maintained, water can find its way between the stem and steerer tube of threaded headsets, causing corrosion and seizing.

Threaded headsets have some advantages as well:

- Threaded steerer tubes are matched to the frame at the factory simplifying the adjustment of handle bar height.
- Threaded headsets use a quill stem that can be adjusted vertically over a wider range than typical threadless headset stems.

=== Adjustable head angle ===
At least one manufacturer, Cane Creek, offers an after-market threadless headset bearing kits that enables changing the steering axis angle. When all else remains the same, this alters the geometric trail of the bike.

== Bearing types ==
Bicycle headset bearings are usually ball bearings, either loose balls, caged balls, or presealed in a cartridge; needle bearings are also available.

It is important to distinguish different standards of cartridge bearings in Integrated 1 1/8 in (29 mm) headsets. There are three integrated standards which are not compatible with each other. The numbers (45/45, 36/45, 36/36) refer to the angle on the cartridge bearing they use. All these bearings look similar.

Campagnolo Standard: 45/45. (often referred as Campagnolo standard) This is common in BMX frames, BMX-derived dirt jump frames (like the Transition Trail-Or-Park). They are also common on road bikes. Three most common manufacturers are Campagnolo, FSA and Cane Creek. Head tubes with this standard have a 42.0 mm inner diameter.

Cane Creek Standard: 36/45. Very common on mountain bike frames and a fair number of road frames. Most frames made by Giant that have integrated head-tubes use this standard (which amounts to a lot of bicycles). Two major manufacturers: FSA and Cane Creek. Head-tubes with this standard have a 41.1 mm inner diameter, and Cane Creek claims its CC Standard headsets will fit in a Campagnolo Standard head tube using a 0.25 mm shim under the top cap of the headset.

FSA Standard: 36/36. No one uses this standard for fully integrated headsets (bearing sitting in frame) except for a few niche brands. There are still a lot of 36/36 bearings as they are used in all FSA's semi-integrated (internal cup) headsets and some of their standard headsets as well.

== Standard measurements ==
Frame and headset manufacturers have developed several sizing standards:

=== Fork dimensions ===
Fork standard	Stem-clamp diameter (nominal)	Crown-race seat diameter (nominal)
1 in (25 mm) ISO	25.4 mm	26.43 mm
1 in (25 mm) JIS	25.4 mm	27.03 mm
1 1/8″	28.6 mm	30.015 mm
1 1/4″	31.8 mm	33.0 mm
1.5″	38.1 mm	39.76 mm

=== Cylindrical bore head tubes ===
Traditional headset cups are pressed into a cylindrical head tube. Some standard dimensions of the head tube on the frame (for traditional and semi-integrated/ZeroStack) are:

Head tube ID (nominal)	Head tube standard	Head tube type
29.9 mm	1 in (25 mm) JIS	Traditional
30.1 mm	1 in (25 mm) ISO	Traditional
33.95 mm	1 1/8 in (29 mm) Standard	Traditional
36.95 mm	1 1/4 in (32 mm) Standard	Traditional
41.4 mm	1 in (25 mm) ZeroStack	ZeroStack
44.0 mm	1 1/8 in (29 mm) ZeroStack	ZeroStack
49.61 mm	1.5 in (38 mm) Standard	Traditional
55.95 mm	1.5 in (38 mm) ZeroStack	ZeroStack

=== Integrated head tubes (with chamfers) ===
Bike frames with integrated headsets have cups machined directly in the frame, and the bearing sits directly into the frame instead of via separately installed cups. Fewer tools needed compared to traditional bearing cups which need to be pressed into the frame using special tools (or a hammer and wood block).

Head tube ID (nominal)	Head tube standard	Head tube type
38.15 mm	1 in (25 mm) Cane Creek Integrated Standard	Integrated
41.1 mm	1 1/8 in (29 mm) Cane Creek Integrated Standard	Integrated
42.0 mm	1 1/8 in (29 mm) Italian/Campagnolo Integrated Standard	Integrated
47.0 mm	1 1/4 in (32 mm) Integrated Standard	Integrated
52.1 mm	1.5 in (38 mm) Integrated Standard	Integrated

== Wear and failure modes ==
Headsets on bicycles, particularly those without fenders, are exposed to water and grit thrown off by the front tire, which causes rust and rapid wear. Better headsets use rubber lip seals or "O" rings (dirt skirt) to try to keep water out, with varying degrees of success. External Neoprene bands with a Velcro fastening are available to wrap and protect the lower race, and are removable for cleaning. Some cyclists remove the fork and reassemble with a section of old inner tube over the lower race, which performs the same function, albeit with less convenience.

On bicycles ridden only in dry conditions and/or with fenders, the normal failure mode is a progressive notchiness in the steering, described as "indexing" in the bicycle world, caused by pitting of the races or false brinelling, although the term stems from a misunderstanding of the cause; true brinelling is caused merely by pressing the ball axially into the race, and it is almost impossible to replicate this damage even by striking the fork crown repeatedly with a hammer. The pits are by far deepest at the front and back of the head tube, and are actually caused by flexing of the fork blades, which is transmitted to the steerer tube. This misaligns the bearings and causes fretting, a small amplitude, large stress movement which tears metal from the races at the points where the balls rest.

The solution is to have a 45 degree interface in the headset where this flexing movement can be accommodated, preserving the relative alignment of the races and allowing the ball bearings to take pure axial and rotational loads. Shimano cartridge bearing headsets do this by allowing the cartridges to move relative to the pressed-in cups, while Stronglight roller bearing headsets, and most threadless headsets, now have loose upper and lower races which can move relative to the cups. Modern headsets, therefore, rarely suffer from false brinelling.

A less common headset failure is really a frame failure. The head tube can stretch, allowing a headset cup, which is supposed to be a tight interference fit, to become loose in the tube. Lugless frames are most vulnerable; in a lugged frame the lug reinforces the top and bottom of the head tube and generally prevents stretching of this type. A loose cup can be fixed with a retaining compound such as Loctite 660, and some manufacturers produce slightly oversized cups to cope with this situation. It is usually the lower cup that is affected.

== Add-ons ==
In order to provide a cable stop for front cantilever brakes or centerpull brakes, a hanger may be incorporated into the headset, either as part of the washer between the top race and the lock nut in the case of threaded headsets, or as part of a spacer between the top race and the stem in the case of threadless headsets.
