= Wallplate =

wallplate, wall plate, or wall-plate may refer to:

- Wall plate, in building frame construction
- Wall plate for an electrical outlet or light switch
  - Keystone wall plate

== See also ==
- Faceplate (disambiguation)
