= Queen's Plate (disambiguation) =

The Queen's Plate (currently the "King's Plate"), run since 1860, is Canada's oldest thoroughbred horse race and is the first leg in the Canadian Triple Crown.

The Queen's Plate may also refer to the following horse races:

- King's Plate (South Africa), formerly known as Queen's Plate, run since 1861, a premier South African flat race
- Queen Elizabeth Stakes (ATC), an Australian race in Sydney, New South Wales, known as Queen's Plate 1851–1872
- Queen Elizabeth Stakes (VRC), an Australian race in Melbourne, Victoria, known as the Queen's Plate 1854–1872
- Queen's Plate, at Newmarket Racecourse (also known as "King's Plate"), England, run between 1634 and 1765

== See also ==
- Oak Tree Stakes, a race at Goodwood Racecourse known as L'Ormarins Queen's Plate Stakes from 2014 to 2018
- Queen (disambiguation)
- Plate (disambiguation)
- King's Plate (disambiguation)
