= King's Plate (disambiguation) =

The King's Plate (Queen's Plate during the reign of female monarch) is a horse race, and the first leg of the Canadian Triple Crown.

King's Plate or Kings Plate or king plate or variation may also refer to:

== Horse races ==
- King's Plate (South Africa) (also "Queen's Plate"), run since 1861, known as the "King's Plate" from 1900 to 1952 and since 2023
- King's Plate (UK) (also "Queen's Plate") at Newmarket Racecourse, England, UK; run between 1634 and 1765

== Other uses ==
- King plate, a breastplate, a form of regalia used by colonial authorities to recognize Aboriginal chieftains in Australia

== See also ==
- King (disambiguation)
- Plate (disambiguation)
- Queen's Plate (disambiguation)
