= Precession (mechanical) =

Mechanical displacement of an axis

Mechanical precession is the process of a round part (in blue) in a round hole (in red) rolling in the direction opposite to the rotational direction of the applied radial force. (The applied radial force is depicted by the green arrow. The arrow's counterclockwise rotation depicts the direction of precession, while the direction of rotation is shown by the clockwise rotation of the blue square. The center of the blue square is traversing counterclockwise along a small circle, the orbit, of diameter equal to the difference of the diameters of the red circle and the blue circle, even though the blue square rotates clockwise). If the blue circle has a diameter d and the red circle a diameter d + δ. The instant the green arrow is pointing downwards, the blue circle is pressed against the red circle at the bottom (point A on the blue circle). The force rotating counterclockwise causes the blue circle to roll around the red circle clockwise. When it has rolled a distance πd, the circumference of the blue circle, point A again touches the red circle. Since the circumference of the red circle is π(d + δ), point A touches the red circle a distance πδ clockwise from the bottom.

Precession is the process of a round part in a round hole, rotating with respect to each other, wherein the inner part begins rolling around the circumference of the outer bore, in a direction opposite of rotation. This is caused by too much clearance between them and a radial force on the part that constantly changes direction. The direction of rotation of the inner part is opposite to the direction of rotation of the radial force.

== Mechanism ==
In a rotating machine, such as motor, engine, gear train, etc., precession can occur when too much clearance exists between a shaft and a bushing, or between the races and rolling elements in roller and ball bearings. Often a result of wear, inadequate lubrication (too little or too thin), or lack of precision engineering, such precession is usually accompanied by excess vibration and an audible rubbing or buzzing noise. This tends to accelerate the wear process, possibly leading to spalling, galling, or false brinelling (fretting wear) of the contact surfaces.

In stationary parts on a rotating object, such as a bolt threaded into a hole, because the sideways, or radial, load constantly shifts position during use, this lateral force translates into a rolling force that moves opposite to the direction of rotation. This can cause threaded parts to either tighten or loosen under a load, depending on the direction of rotation, typically with a force that can far exceed the typical torque of a wrench. For example, this is a common problem in bicycle pedals, thus on nearly all bikes built after the 1930s, the left-side pedal is equipped with left-hand (backwards) threads, to prevent it from unscrewing itself while riding.

This precession is a process purely due to contact forces and does not depend on inertia and is not inversely proportional to spin rate. It is completely unrelated to torque-free and torque-induced precession.

== Examples ==
Precession caused by fretting can cause fastenings under large torque loads to unscrew themselves.

=== Automobile lug nuts ===
Automobiles have also used left-threaded lug nuts on left-side wheels, but now commonly use tapered lug nuts, which do not precess.

=== Bicycle pedals ===
Bicycle pedals are left-threaded on the left-hand crank so that precession tightens the pedal rather than loosening it. This may seem counter-intuitive since the pedals rotate in the direction that would unscrew them from the cranks, but the torque exerted due to the precession is several orders of magnitude greater than that caused by bearing friction or even a jammed pedal bearing.

For a pedal, a rotating load arises from downward pedaling force on a spindle rotating with its crank making the predominantly downward force effectively rotate about the pedal spindle, opposite to the rotation of the pedal. What may be less evident is that even tightly fitting parts have relative clearance due to their elasticity, metals not being rigid materials as is evident from steel springs. Under load, micro deformations, enough to cause motion, occur in such joints. This can be seen from wear marks where pedal spindles seat on crank faces."

Shimano SPD axle units, which can be unscrewed from the pedal body for servicing, have a left-hand thread where the axle unit screws into the right-hand pedal; the opposite case to the pedal-crank interface. Otherwise precession of the pedal body around the axle would tend to unscrew one from the other.

=== Bicycle bottom brackets ===
English threaded bicycle bottom brackets are left-threaded on the right-hand (usually drive) side into the bottom bracket shell. This is the opposite of pedals into cranks because the sense of the relative motion between the parts is opposite. (Italian and French threaded bottom brackets have right-hand threading on both sides.)

=== Bicycle sprockets ===
Splined sprockets precess against any lockring which is screwed into the freehub. Shimano uses a lockring with detents to hold cassette sprockets in place, and this resists precession. Sturmey-Archer once used 12-splined sprockets for 2- and 3-speed racing hubs, and these were secured with a left-threaded lockring for the same reason. (Fixed gear bicycles also use a left-threaded lockring but this is not because of precession; it is merely to ensure that the lockring tends to tighten, should the sprocket begin to unscrew.)

=== Bearings in manual transmissions ===
A bearing supported gear in a manual transmission rotates synchronously with its shaft due to the dog-gear engagement. In this case, the small diametrical clearance in the bearing will induce precession of the roller group relative to the gear mitigating any fretting that occurs if the same bearing rollers always push against the same spot on the gear. Typically the 4th and 5th gears will have precession inducing features, while 1st through 3rd gears might not since cars spend less time in those gears. Transmission failure due to lack of precession is possible in gear boxes when low gears are engaged for long periods of time.

== See also ==
- Fretting
