= Plate =

Plate may refer to:

== Cooking ==
- Plate (dishware), broad, mainly flat vessel commonly used to serve food
- Plates, tableware, dishes or dishware used for setting a table, serving food and dining
- Plate, the content of such a plate (for example: rice plate)
- Plate, to present food, on a plate
- Plate, forequarter cut of beef

== Places ==
- Plate, Germany, municipality in Parchim, Mecklenburg-Vorpommern, Germany
- Plate, borough of Lüchow, Lower Saxony, Germany
- River Plate (disambiguation)
- Tourelle de la Plate, lighthouse in France

== Science and technology ==
=== Biology and medicine ===
- Plate (anatomy), several meanings
- Dental plate, also known as dentures
- Dynamic compression plate, metallic plate used in orthopedics to fix bone
- Microtiter plate (or microplate or microwell plate), flat plate with multiple "wells" used as small test tubes
- Orthopedic plate, internal fixation used in orthopaedic surgery
- Petri dish or Petri plate, shallow dish on which biological cultures may be grown and/or viewed

=== Geology ===
- Tectonic plate, pieces of Earth's crust and uppermost mantle, together referred to as the lithosphere
  - Plate tectonics, the study of the movement of such plates

=== Physics ===
- Plate, physical approximation of a theoretical plate in separation processes
- Plate electrode, type of electrode used in vacuum tubes
- Plate (structure), concept used in continuum mechanics as part of the plate theory
- Plate trick, mathematical demonstration of quaternions and particle spins
- Wilhelmy plate, used to measure tension at an interface between air and a liquid or between two liquids

=== Construction ===
- Anchor plate, large plate connected to a tie rod or bolt for structural reinforcement
- Sill plate, the bottom horizontal member of a wall or building to which vertical members are attached
- Wall plate, vertical component used in building construction

=== Electronics ===
- Anodes, electrodes used in vacuum tubes (thermionic valves) and similar devices

=== Printing and photography ===
- Photographic plate, medium from which a photograph may be developed
  - Plate camera, early type of camera that used photographic plates
- Printing plate, printing medium:
  - Plate, in Intaglio (printmaking), the direct opposite of a relief print
  - Plate, in lithography, method of printing originally based on the immiscibility of oil and water
  - Plate, a (part of a) "tipped-in page", separately-printed page in a book used to carry one or more images

=== Transportation ===
- Approach plate, chart used by a pilot to perform an instrument approach and landing on a runway
- Plate B, Plate C, ... , Plate H, loading gauges used on North American railroads

== Metal plates ==
- Plate (metal), rectangular flat metal stock that is more than 6 mm or 0.25 in thick, not as thin as sheet metal
  - Plate, element of a folding machine
  - Plate armour, body armor made from metal plates
  - Vehicle registration plate (license plate), sign attached to a vehicle in order to identify it
    - L-plate (learner plate), sign attached to a vehicle to indicate that the driver has a provisional driving license
- Plated, item with a deposition of metallic layers

== Sport ==
- Home plate, location on a baseball field
- Several trophies, e.g.,
  - Annapolis Subscription Plate, in horse racing
  - County Championship Plate, in rugby union
  - Mandela Challenge Plate, in rugby union
- Weight plate, flat, heavy object, usually made of iron, used in strength training or weightlifting

== Other uses ==
- Plate (surname)
- Plate, in heraldry, Roundel argent (white/silver)

== See also ==
- - Basal plate (disambiguation)
  - Faceplate (disambiguation)
  - Home plate (disambiguation)
- Plat (disambiguation)
