= False brinelling =

Bearing damage caused by fretting

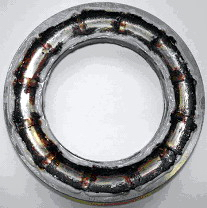
False brinelling of a bearing

False brinelling is a type of bearing damage caused by fretting, with or without corrosion, that causes imprints that look similar to brinelling, but are caused by a different mechanism. False brinelling may occur in bearings which act under small oscillations or vibrations.

The basic cause of false brinelling is that the design of the bearing does not have a method for redistribution of lubricant without large rotational movement of all bearing surfaces in the raceway. Lubricant is pushed out of a loaded region during small oscillatory movements and vibration where the bearings surfaces repeatedly do not move very far. Without lubricant, wear is increased when the small oscillatory movements occur again. It is possible for the resulting wear debris to oxidize and form an abrasive compound which further accelerates wear.

== Mechanism of action ==
In normal operation, a rolling-element bearing has the rollers and races separated by a thin layer of lubricant such as grease or oil. Although these lubricants normally appear liquid (not solid), under high pressure they act as solids and keep the bearing and race from touching.

If the lubricant is removed, the bearings and races can touch directly. While bearings and races appear smooth to the eye, they are microscopically rough. Thus, high points of each surface can touch, but "valleys" do not. The bearing load is thus spread over much less area, increasing the contact stress and causing pieces of each surface to break off or to become pressure-welded and then break off when the bearing rolls on.

The broken-off pieces are also called wear debris. Wear debris is bad because it is relatively large compared to the surrounding surface finish and thus creates more regions of high contact stress. Worse, the steel in ordinary bearings can oxidize (rust), producing a more abrasive compound which accelerates wear.

== Simulation of false brinelling ==
The simulation of false brinelling is possible with the help of the finite element method. For the simulation, the relative displacements (slip) between rolling element and raceway as well as the pressure in the rolling contact are determined. For comparison between simulation and experiments, the friction work density is used, which is the product of friction coefficient, slip, and local pressure. The simulation results can be used to determine critical application parameters or to explain the damage mechanisms.

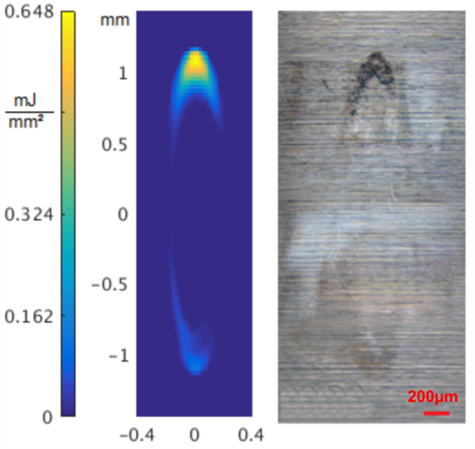
Comparison between simulated frictional work density and wear

Physical simulation of the false brinelling mechanism has been standardized since the 1980s in the Fafnir bearing test instrument, where two sets of thrust ball bearings are compressed with a fixed load, and the bearings are oscillated by an eccentric arm under standardized conditions. This culminated in the ASTM D4170 standard. Although an old method, this is still the leading quality control method for greases that need to avoid the false brinelling damage.

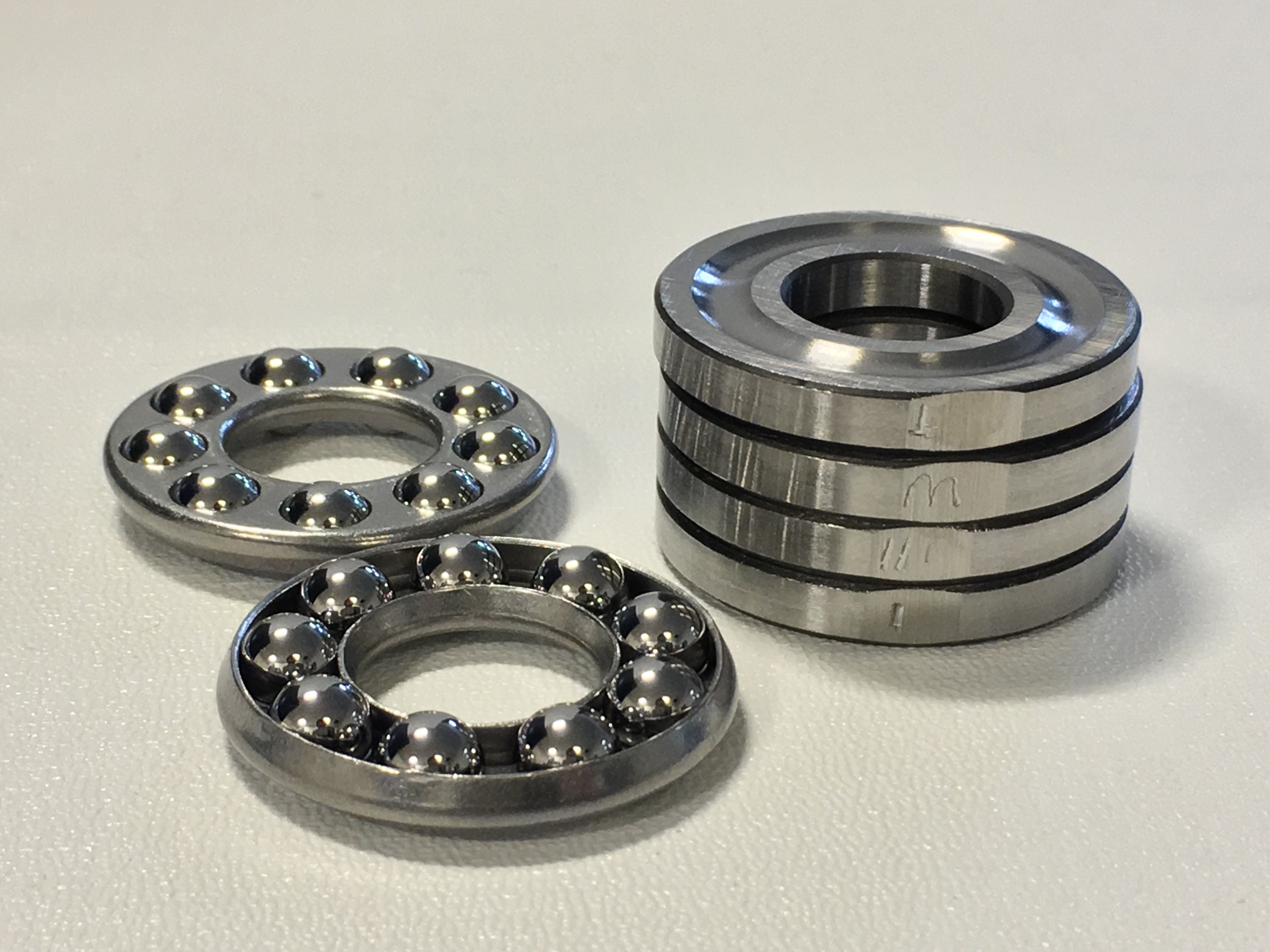
Test bearings for ASTM D4170 False Brinelling fretting wear test

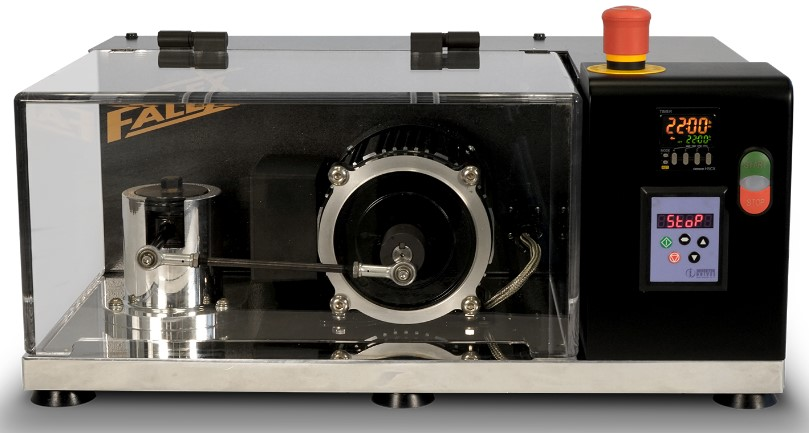
False Brinelling Fretting wear tester

== Examples ==
False brinelling was first mentioned by Almen in 1937. Almen found that wheel bearings were damaged before they were used by customers. Furthermore, he found that the bearings were more damaged for long-distance shipping of the cars and that the season of shipping also had an influence. The reason for the damaged bearings were micro-oscillations which occurred due to the shipping. The small oscillations result in fatigue cracking, followed by release of particles that subsequently started to abrasively damage the contact area between a ball and the bearing race, resulting in wear damage. Because the damage has a similar look to brinelling, it was called false brinelling.

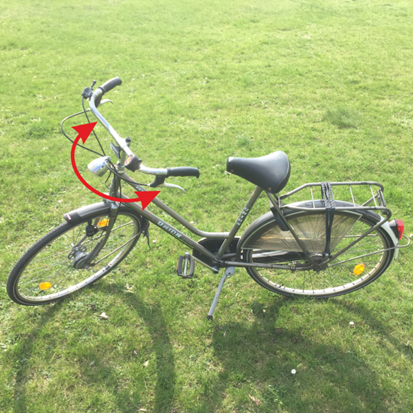
Example of an application in which false brinelling may occur

Although the car-delivery problem has been solved, there are many modern examples. A major maintenance problem is posed by pitch bearings in wind turbines, for which specialty greases had to be developed that result in almost no false brinelling damage. Similar damage may also occur in electric and electronic contacts that are subjected to vibrations during use, such as aerospace and automotive connectors and even remote-control battery compartments. Although the damage in these areas may not be as severe as the false brinelling in bearings, the damage mechanisms are similar and result in the creation of particles in the contact that can severely influence the electrical connection.

Also, generators or pumps may fail or need service because of this damage, so it is common to have a nearby spare unit which is left off most of the time but brought into service when needed. However, vibration from the operating unit can cause bearing failure in the unit which is switched off. When that unit is turned on, the bearings may be noisy due to damage, and may fail completely within a few days or weeks even though the unit and its bearings are otherwise new. Common solutions include keeping the spare unit at a distance from the one which is on and vibrating, manually rotating shafts of the spare units on a regular (for example, weekly) basis, or regularly switching between the units so that both are in regular (for example, weekly) operation.

Until recently, bicycle headsets tended to suffer from false brinelling in the "straight ahead" steering position, due to small movements caused by flexing of the fork. Good modern headsets incorporate a plain bearing to accommodate this flexing, leaving the ball race to provide pure rotational movement.
