= Rice plate =

Rice plate may refer to:

- Rice Plate (2007 film), a film by Rohit Roy

== Food ==
- List of rice dishes
  - Thali, a Nepalese and Indian food
  - 碟頭飯 (rice dish), served at dai pai dong

== See also ==
- Rice (disambiguation)
- Plate (disambiguation)
