= Home plate (disambiguation) =

Home plate is a baseball term for the final base that a player must touch to score.

Home plate may also refer to:

- Home Plate (Mars), a geologic feature on Mars observed by the Spirit rover
- Home Plate (album), a 1975 album by Bonnie Raitt
- Home Plate Farm, a historic building in Sudbury, Massachusetts, U.S.
- MLB Home Plate, now MLB Network Radio, a satellite radio station

== See also ==
- Home Place (disambiguation)
