= Keystone module =

Type of data connector

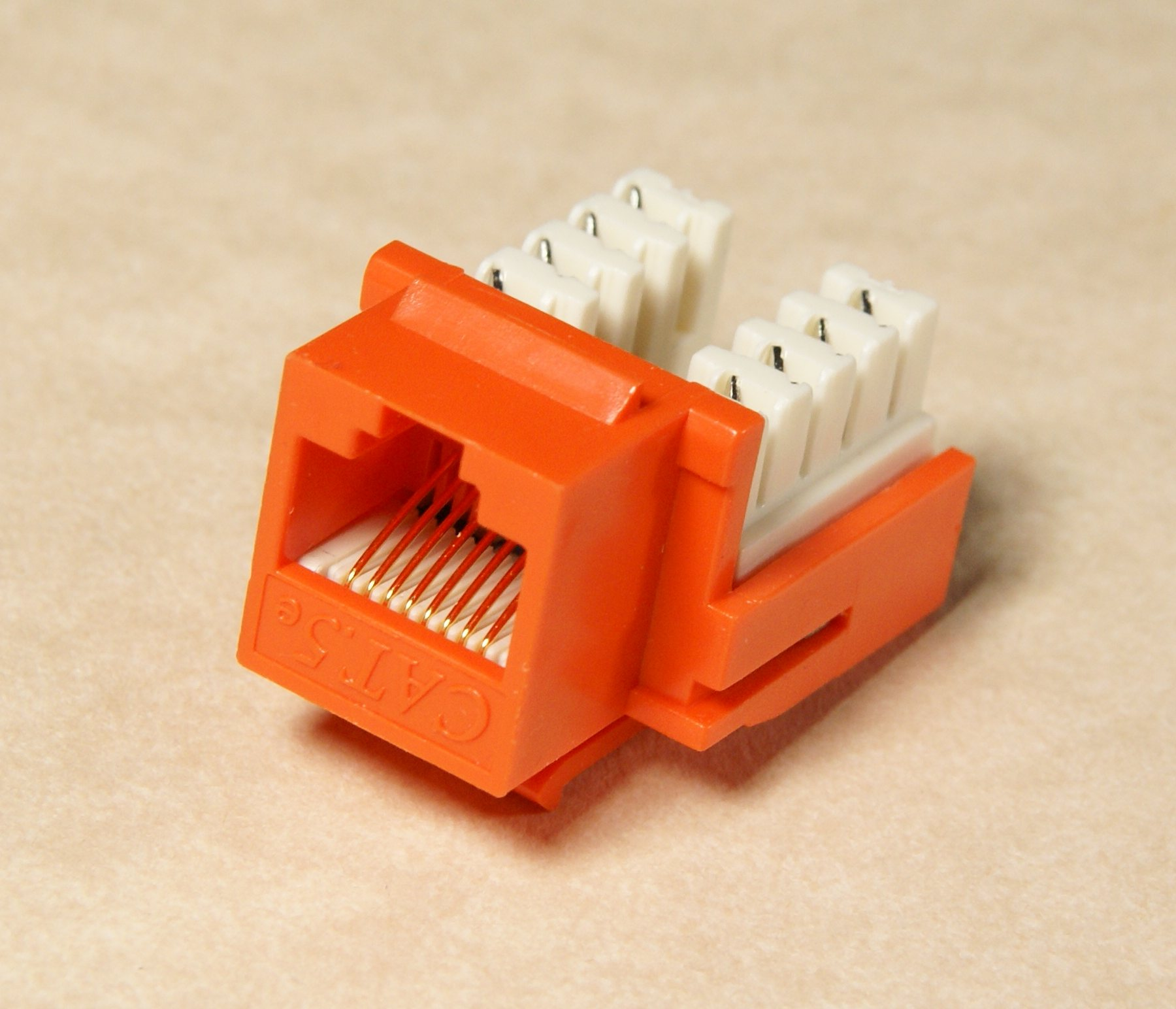
A keystone module for a CAT5 network cable

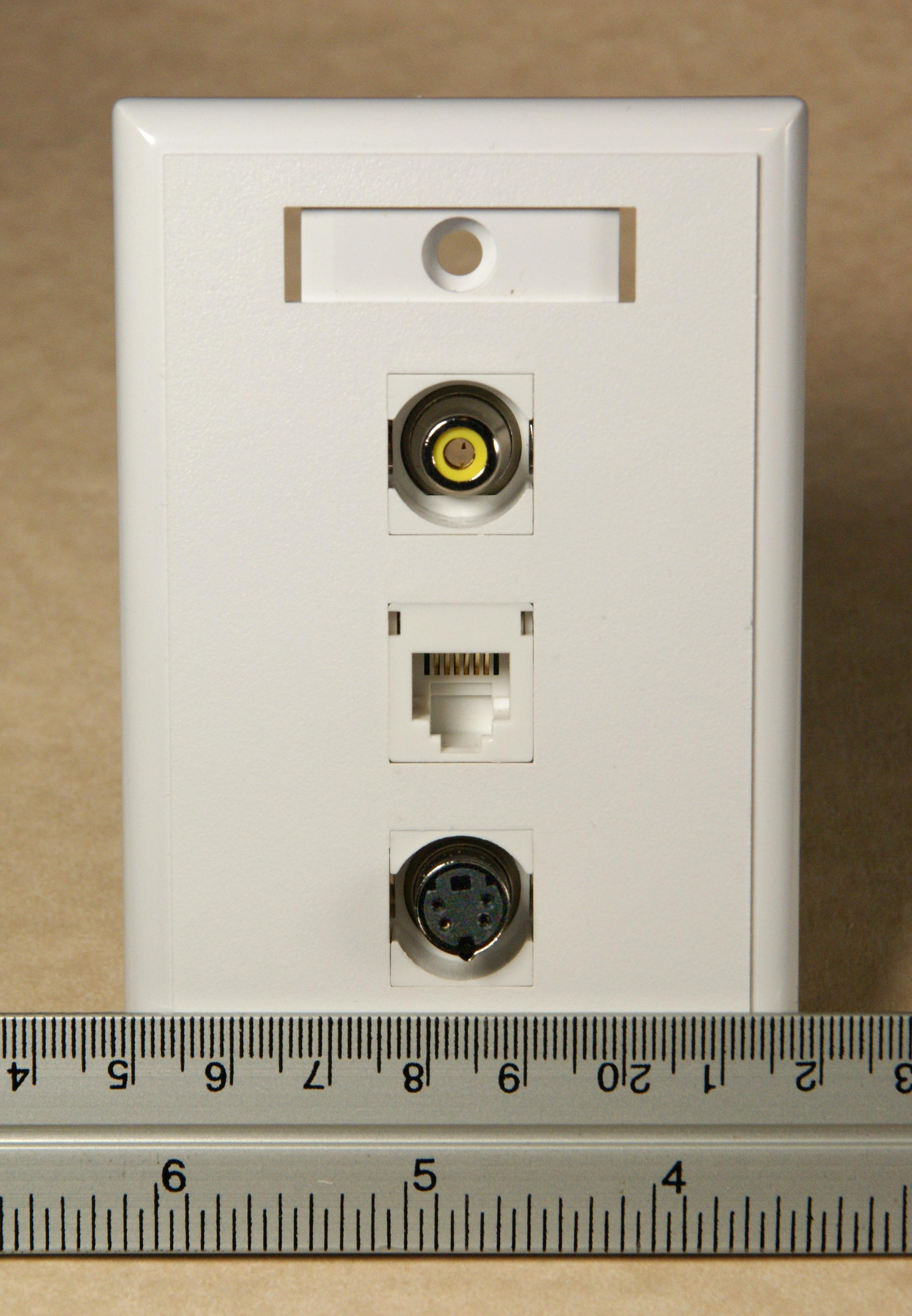
A 3-port keystone wall plate

A keystone module is a standardized snap-in package for mounting a variety of low-voltage electrical jacks or optical connectors into a keystone wall plate, face plate, surface-mount box, or a patch panel.

Keystone modules have a rectangular face of 14.5 mm wide by 16.0 mm high and are held in place with flexible tabs. This allows them to be snapped into a mounting plate with correspondingly-sized rectangular holes, called ports. Most keystones are interchangeable and replaceable. This provides much flexibility in arranging and mounting many different types of electrical jacks in one plate or panel without requiring customized manufacturing.

Some keystones use a pass-through type connector, where there is a jack on both the front face and the rear side. Others only have a jack on the front and employ a different mechanism for hard-wiring signal cables to the rear, such as a mini 110 block, an insulation-displacement connector, or a crimp or solder connection.

== Types ==
Many types of jacks are available in the keystone module format, limited mainly by their physical size, including:

- 6P6C (RJ-11) modular jacks (telephone)
- 8P8C (RJ-45) modular jacks (computer networking), unshielded for UTP cable and shielded for STP.
- F connector (TV antenna/cable/satellite), 75 ohm coaxial
- RCA jacks (audio/video)
- 4-pin mini-DIN (S-Video jacks)
- HDMI jacks (high-definition video and audio)
- Optical fiber connectors
- BNC connector (50 ohm coaxial)
- USB jacks
- Speaker terminals
- Banana connectors
- Binding posts
- 3.5 mm TRS connector (miniature stereo headphone jack)
- British telephone socket either as a master socket or a secondary socket

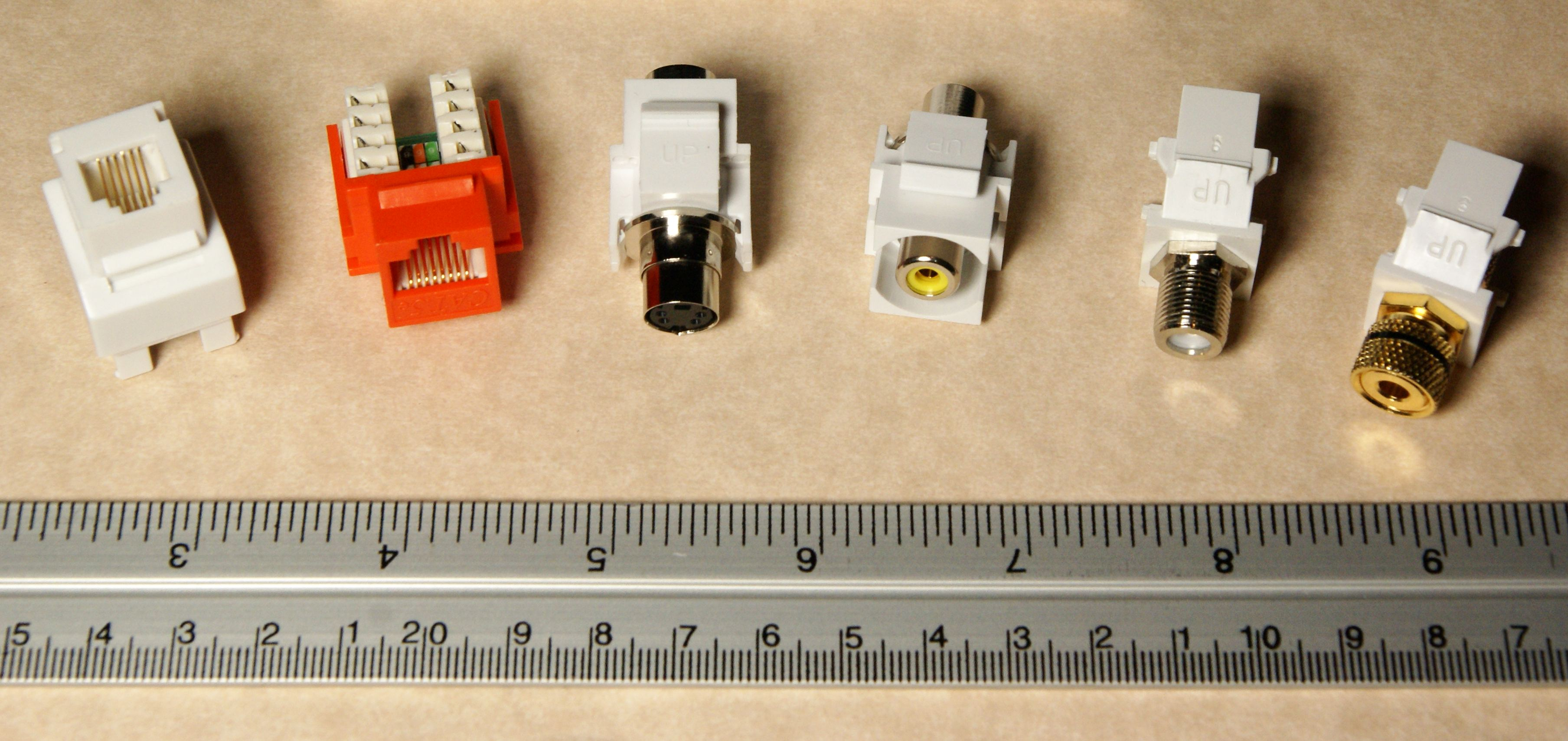
An assortment of different keystone modules. From left to right: 6P6C (RJ-11), 8P8C (RJ-45) with mini 110 block in rear, 4-pin mini-DIN (S-Video) jack, RCA jack, F connector, banana jack.

== History ==
The origin of the "Keystone" module may be traced back to US Patent 4261633 of Aug 27, 1979 for a "Wiring module for telephone jack" - by Amp Incorporated. The module referred to in that patent was affixed by "A pair of diagonally inclined mounting flanges (which) include stepped, panel bearing surfaces .. at the outer free ends thereof." The unit was "inserted through the panel opening, with the sides of the opening resiliently deflecting the (mounting flanges), until they pass through the opening and spring outwardly away from the remainder of the housing, with the panel bearing surfaces .. thereof seated against the front surface of the panel".

However, the current design (now called "Keystone") is first referenced in US Patent US 5624274 of Nov 7, 1995 for a "Telephone connector with contact protection block" - by International Connectors And Cable Corporation. In this design the module is affixed by a single diagonally inclined mounting flange, together with a protuberance (ramp) on the opposite side. In the patent description, it is stated that "the jack assembly may be mounted to a face plate by first inserting the bottom of the jack assembly into a jack opening until the ramp of the housing engages a mounting surface of the face plate. The jack assembly is then rotated and snapped into place due to deflection of the cantilever latch of the housing."
