= Brinelling =

Permanent indentation of a hard surface

Brinelling /ˈbrɪnəlɪŋ/ is the permanent indentation of a hard surface. It is named after the Brinell scale of hardness, in which a small ball is pushed against a hard surface at a preset level of force, and the depth and diameter of the mark indicates the Brinell hardness of the surface. Brinelling is permanent plastic deformation of a surface, and usually occurs while two surfaces in contact are stationary (such as rolling elements and the raceway of a bearing) and the material yield strength has been exceeded.

Brinelling is undesirable, as the parts often mate with other parts in very close proximity. The very small indentations can quickly lead to improper operation, such as chattering or excess vibration, which in turn can accelerate other forms of wear, such as spalling and ultimately, failure of the bearing.

== Introduction ==
Brinelling is a material surface failure caused by Hertz contact stress that exceeds the material limit. It usually occurs in situations where a significant load force is distributed over a relatively small surface area. Brinelling typically results from a heavy or repeated impact load, either while stopped or during rotation, though it can also be caused by just one application of a force greater than the material limit.

Brinelling can be caused by a heavy load resting on a stationary bearing for an extended length of time. The result is a permanent dent or "brinell mark". The brinell marks will often appear in evenly spaced patterns along the bearing races, resembling the primary elements of the bearing, such as rows of indented lines for needle or roller bearings or rounded indentations in ball bearings. It is a common cause of roller bearing failures, and loss of preload in bolted joints when a hardened washer is not used. For example, brinelling occurs in casters when the ball bearings within the swivel head produce grooves in the hard cap, thus degrading performance by increasing the required swivel force.

== Avoiding brinelling damage ==
Engineers can use the Brinell hardness of materials in their calculations to avoid this mode of failure. A rolling element bearing's static load rating is defined to avoid this failure type. Increasing the number of elements can provide better distribution of the load, so bearings intended for a large load may have many balls, or use needles instead. This decreases the chances of brinelling, but increases friction and other factors. However, although roller and ball bearings work well for radial and thrust loading, they are often prone to brinelling when very high impact loading, lateral loading, or vibration are experienced. Babbitt bearings or bronze bushings are often used instead of roller bearings in applications where such loads exist, such as in automotive crankshafts or pulley sheaves, to decrease the possibility of brinelling by distributing the force over a very large surface area.

A common cause of brinelling is the use of improper installation procedures. Brinelling often occurs when pressing bearings into holes or onto shafts. Care must usually be taken to ensure that pressure is applied to the proper bearing race to avoid transferring the pressure from one race to the other through the balls or rollers. If pressing force is applied to the wrong race, brinelling can occur to either or both of the races. The act of pressing or clamping can also leave brinell marks, especially if the vise or press has serrated jaws or roughened surfaces. Flat pressing plates are often used in the pressing of bearings, while soft copper, brass, or aluminum jaw covers are often used in vises to help avoid brinell marks from being forced into the workpiece.

== False brinelling ==
Precession between a rotating shaft in a hole, caused by excess clearance due to wear. If a bearing with four balls were located at the blue circumference of the shaft, each ball positioned at the corners of the square, contact of those balls with the red, outer bearing-race only occurs in discrete areas along that race, causing vibration, noise, and accelerated wear, and leaving indentations that resemble brinelling, but can be differentiated from true brinelling.

A similar-looking kind of damage is called false brinelling and is caused by fretting wear. Fretting wear occurs when localized wear-marks develop in evenly spaced patterns, with raised or unworn portions in between, like frets on a guitar. False brinelling occurs in two types: stationary and by precession.

Stationary false-brinelling occurs without any rotational motion in the bearing. This occurs when contacting bodies vibrate against each other in the presence of very small loads, which pushes lubricant out of the contact surface area, all while the bearing assembly cannot move far enough (or rotate far enough) to redistribute the displaced lubricant. The result is a finely polished surface that resembles a brinell mark, but has not permanently deformed either contacting surface. This type of false brinelling usually occurs in bearings during transportation, between the time of manufacture and installation. The polished surfaces are often mistaken for brinelling, although no actual damage to the bearing exists. The false brinelling will disappear after a short break-in period of operation.

Fretting wear can also occur during operation, causing deep indentations. This occurs when small vibrations form in the rotating shaft and become harmonically in sync with the speed of rotation, causing circular oscillations in the shaft. The oscillation causes the shaft to move in precession, and the timing of the rotation speed causes the balls or rollers to contact the races only when they are in similar positions. This forms wear marks caused by contact with the bearings and the races in specific areas, but not in others, leaving an uneven wear-pattern that can become quite deep before failure occurs, resembling brinelling. However, the marks are usually too wide, due to the motion of the bearing, and do not exactly match the shape of the rolling elements, and therefore this type of wear can be differentiated from true brinelling.
