= Home Place =

Home Place or Homeplace may refer to:

== Places ==
- Home Place, Kelling, a house in the United Kingdom
- Home Place, Indiana, an unincorporated community
- Homeplace Plantation House, a historic house in Louisiana
- Homeplace (Washington, Louisiana), listed on the National Register of Historic Places in St. Landry Parish, Louisiana
- Home Place (Benton, Mississippi), listed on the National Register of Historic Places in Yazoo County, Mississippi
- Homeplace (Frankford, West Virginia), a historic house in West Virginia
- The Homeplace, a historic house in Madison County, West Virginia

== Other uses ==
- HomePlace (corporation), a subsidiary of the Waccamaw Corp.
- The Home Place, a 1948 book by Wright Morris
- The Home Place, a 1950 novel by Fred Gipson
- Home Place (Dragonwagon book), a 1990 picture book
- The Home Place, a 2005 play

== See also ==
- Domicile (law), place of residence
