= Instrument panel =

Instrument panel may refer to:

- Control panel (engineering)
- Flight instruments
- Dashboard
