= Keystone wall plate =

Interior decoration for communication wiring

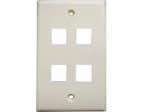
4-port Keystone Wall Plate

Keystone wall plates are used in commercial and industrial buildings to cleanly attach telecommunication cables etc. to a junction box, surface mount box, or a mud ring mounted in the drywall of a building. Keystone wall plates are made to work with many different types of cabling solutions, including coaxial, twisted pair, HDMI, optical fiber, etc. Keystone wall plates are made of plastic and have one to twelve ports. A keystone port is a hole in the wall plate which allows the insertion of a keystone module or other male or female cabling connectors. The most common colors of keystone wall plates are beige and white. Keystone wall plates are commonly made to be compatible with NEMA standard openings and boxes.
