= Wallpaper steamer =

A wallpaper steamer is an electrical device which boils water continuously in order to produce steam. This steam is then allowed to pass through a narrow bore tube to a face plate. This face plate is then held against a wallpapered wall. The steam passes through the paper, saturates the backing paper and partially dissolves the desiccated wallpaper paste. This then allows the wallpaper to be pulled from, or scraped off the wall.

The wallpaper steamer was invented by Peter Ravenscroft Wilkins from Blackwell, Worcestershire, England. Its European patent was filed 19 November 1987.

== Technology ==
The basic form of a wallpaper steamer is a semi-sealed container, usually made of plastic, that contains a heating element. A quantity of water is added to the container and the water comes into contact with the heating element. Once electrical power is connected to the element, it heats up which then in turn heats the water. The water reaches its boiling point, evaporates and produces steam. As the container is sealed, the steam pressure builds up but is released via a small opening in the container to which is connected a length of pressure pipe. At the end of the pressure pipe is a flat plate about 30 cm (12 in) square and 1 cm deep. The plate has a handle on its reverse side. This plate is then held up to the papered wall. The steam being released under pressure from the container travels along the pressure pipe and is released into the forward face of the steam plate. As the plate is held against the wall, a slight seal is maintained which holds steam long enough to force the moisture into the wallpaper, saturating it and rehydrating the wallpaper paste. Once the paste is rehydrated, it starts to lose its adhesive properties, allowing the wallpaper to be either pulled or scraped from the wall.

Penetration of steam, especially with vinyl-coated wallpapers, may be accelerated by first perforating the surface of the wallpaper. A variety of spiked roller and spiked wheel hand tools are available for this.

During use, the operator's hands are close to the steam source and so protective, heat- and vapour-proof gloves, such as silicone oven gloves, may be helpful.

Wallpaper steamers have been more popular in places such as the UK and Europe using 230 V domestic electricity. This provides around 3 kW of steam generating capacity from all sockets around the house.

== Other uses ==
A commercial wallpaper steamer is a conveniently packaged source of steam. This can be used for other purposes too, such as steam-bending wood.
