= River Plate =

River Plate may refer to:

== Places ==
- Río de la Plata, a river and large estuary between Argentina and Uruguay
  - Río de la Plata Basin, the basin of the river
- Viceroyalty of the Río de la Plata, a political entity in the Spanish Empire which contained the territories of present-day Argentina, Bolivia, Paraguay and Uruguay

== Sports ==
- Club Atlético River Plate, an Argentine sports club
  - Club Atlético River Plate (women)
  - Estadio Monumental Antonio Vespucio Liberti, also known as River Plate Stadium, in Buenos Aires, where the above team plays
- Club River Plate (Asunción), a Paraguayan football club
- Club Atlético River Plate Puerto Rico, a Puerto Rican football club
- Club Atlético River Plate (Montevideo), a Uruguayan football club
- Club Deportivo River Plate Ecuador, an Ecuadorian football club
- River Plate F.C., a former Uruguayan football club
- Sociedade Esportiva River Plate, a Brazilian football club
- SV River Plate Aruba, an Aruban football club

== Companies ==
- River Plate Fresh Meat Company, English meat-packing company

== Other uses ==
- Rioplatense Spanish, also known as River Plate Spanish, a dialect of the Spanish language

== See also ==
- Battle of the River Plate, in World War II
  - The Battle of the River Plate (film), a film about the battle
- Live at River Plate, a DVD by Australian rock band AC/DC
  - Live at River Plate (album), related album
- Platte River, a river in North America
