= Stem (bicycle part) =

Type of bicycle component

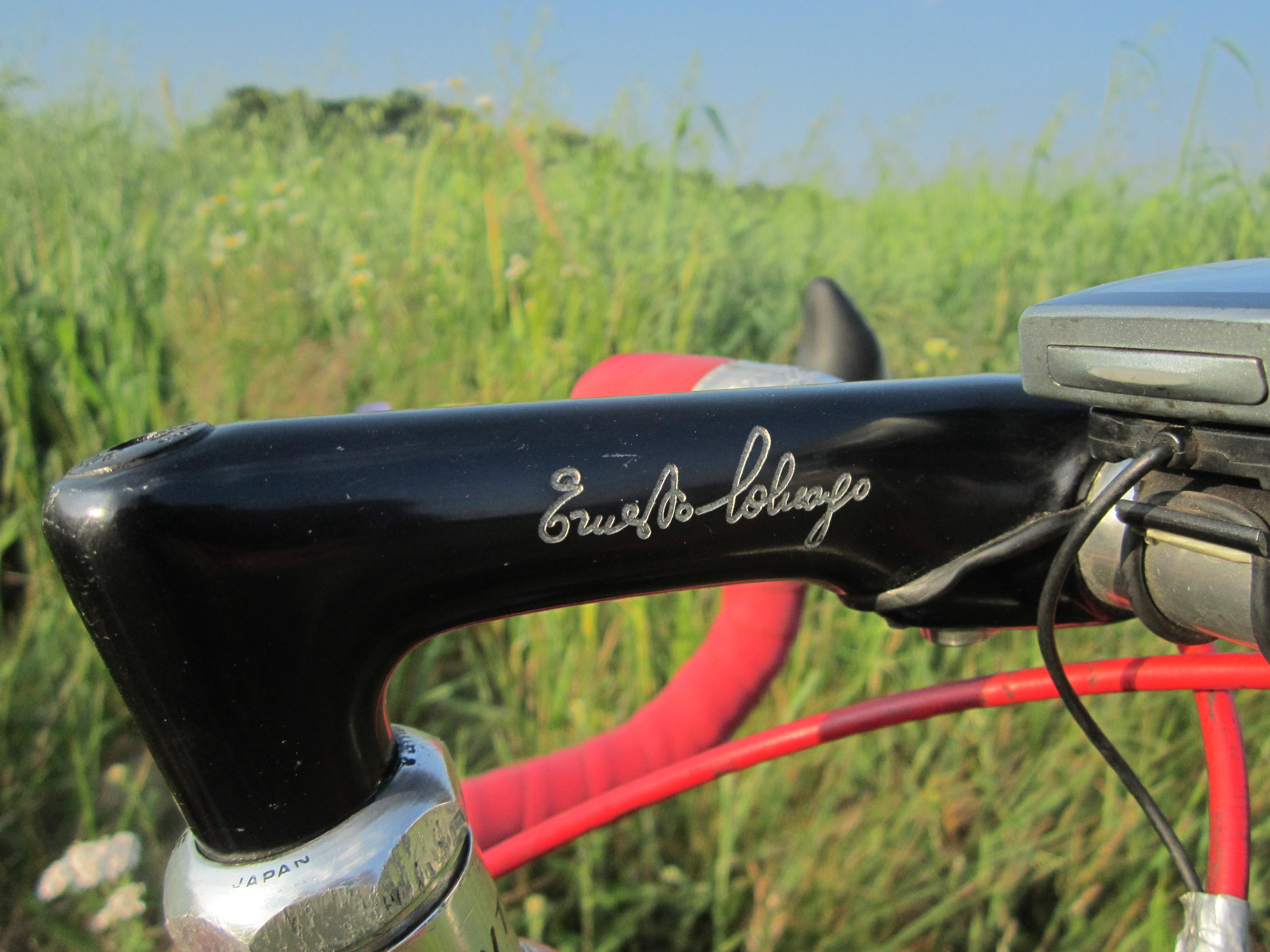
Quill stem classic single-piece type

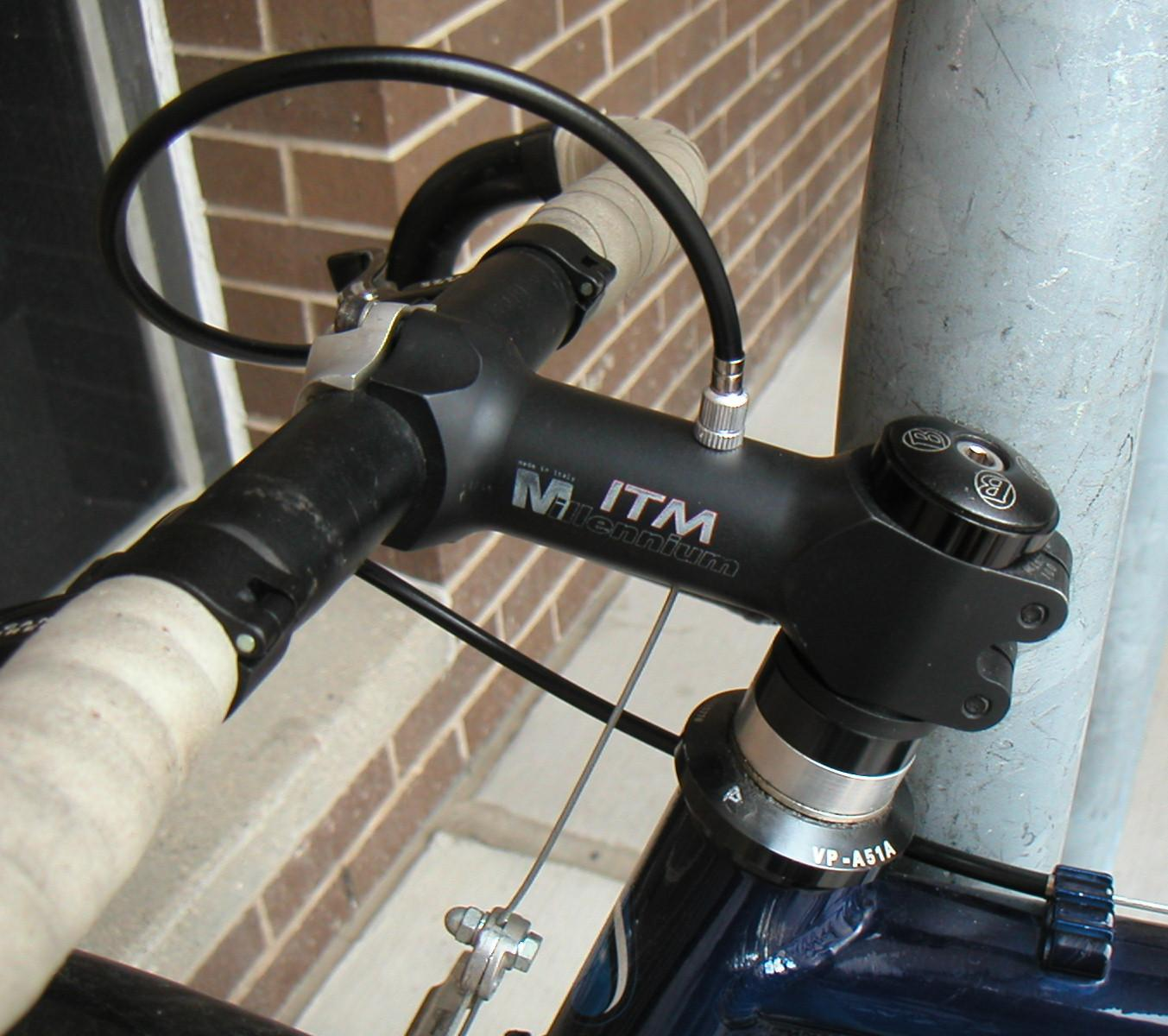
Threadless stem shown with cable hole

The stem is the component on a bicycle that connects the handlebars to the steerer tube of the bicycle fork. Sometimes called a goose neck, a stem's design belongs to either a quill or threadless system, and each system is compatible with respective headset and fork designs:

- Quill: the stem inserts into the steerer tube, which is threaded and does not extend above the headset.
- Threadless: the stem clamps around the steerer tube, which is not threaded and extends above the headset.

== Quill versus threadless ==
Although stems are commonly referred to as being of either the quill or threaded type, the thread in question is the one on the fork steerer tube. Quill stems require a steerer tube of the same length as the headset and head tube combined and thus must be matched to the specific bicycle model. Threadless systems use an unthreaded steerer tube, which extends into the stem and may be cut to length as desired in order to accommodate the height of the headset, head tube, stem and any spacers used to adjust the handlebar height.

Quill systems predate threadless systems. With the advent of threadless stems, manufacturers no longer need to provide a range of threaded forks for a given model; all threadless system forks are made with the same length steerer tube (long). The steerer tubes are then cut to length to fit upon installation. Unthreaded forks often require less labor to swap than threaded forks.

=== Quill stems ===
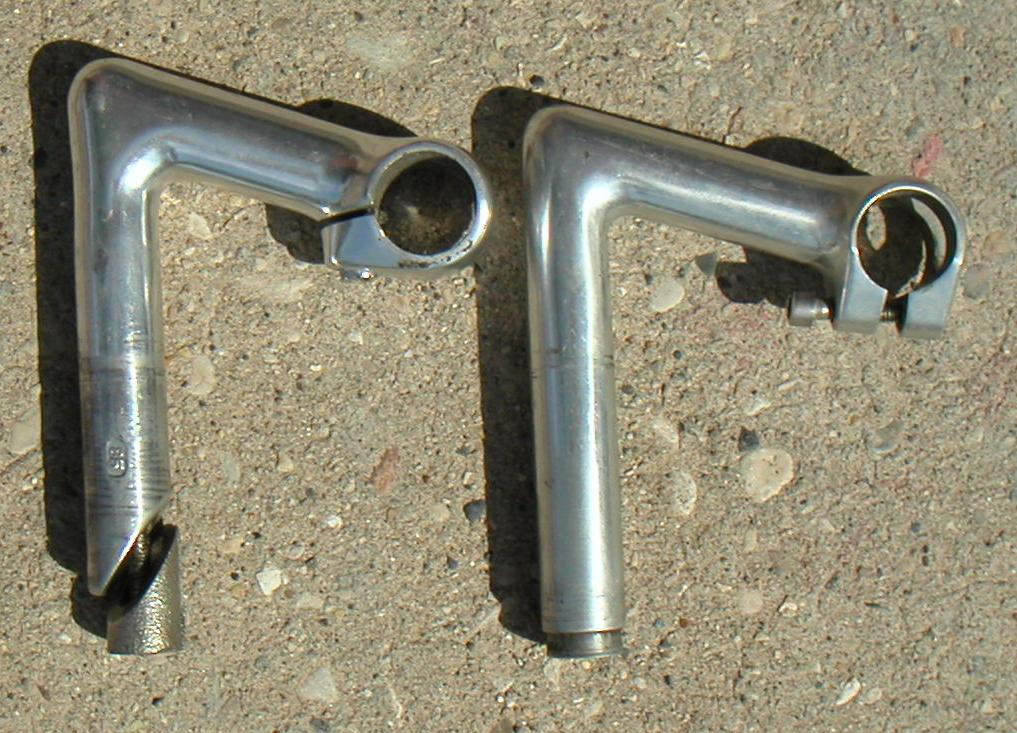
Quill stems showing wedge-shaped (on left) and cone-shaped (on right) expander nuts.

The older of the two handlebar stem styles, quill types have been largely displaced as the industry standard on sport bikes. However, they remain standard on the majority of utility bikes, regardless of price, as well as on less expensive sport bikes and higher-end retro bikes. The quill stem requires the threaded steerer tube of the fork to extend up through the headset but not protrude beyond it. The quill stem fits down into the inside of the top of steerer tube and is held in place by either a wedge-shaped nut and bolt or a cone-shaped expander nut and bolt. In the case of a wedge-shaped nut, the bottom of the stem is cut diagonally to match the wedge and the bolt pulls the wedge against the stem to expand against the inside of the steerer tube and hold the stem in place. In the case of an expander nut, the bottom of the stem is cut perpendicular to its length and also has two slits cut parallel to its length. The cone-shaped expander nut is pulled upwards by the bolt causing the sides of the stem to spread and press against the inside of the steerer tube to hold it in place.

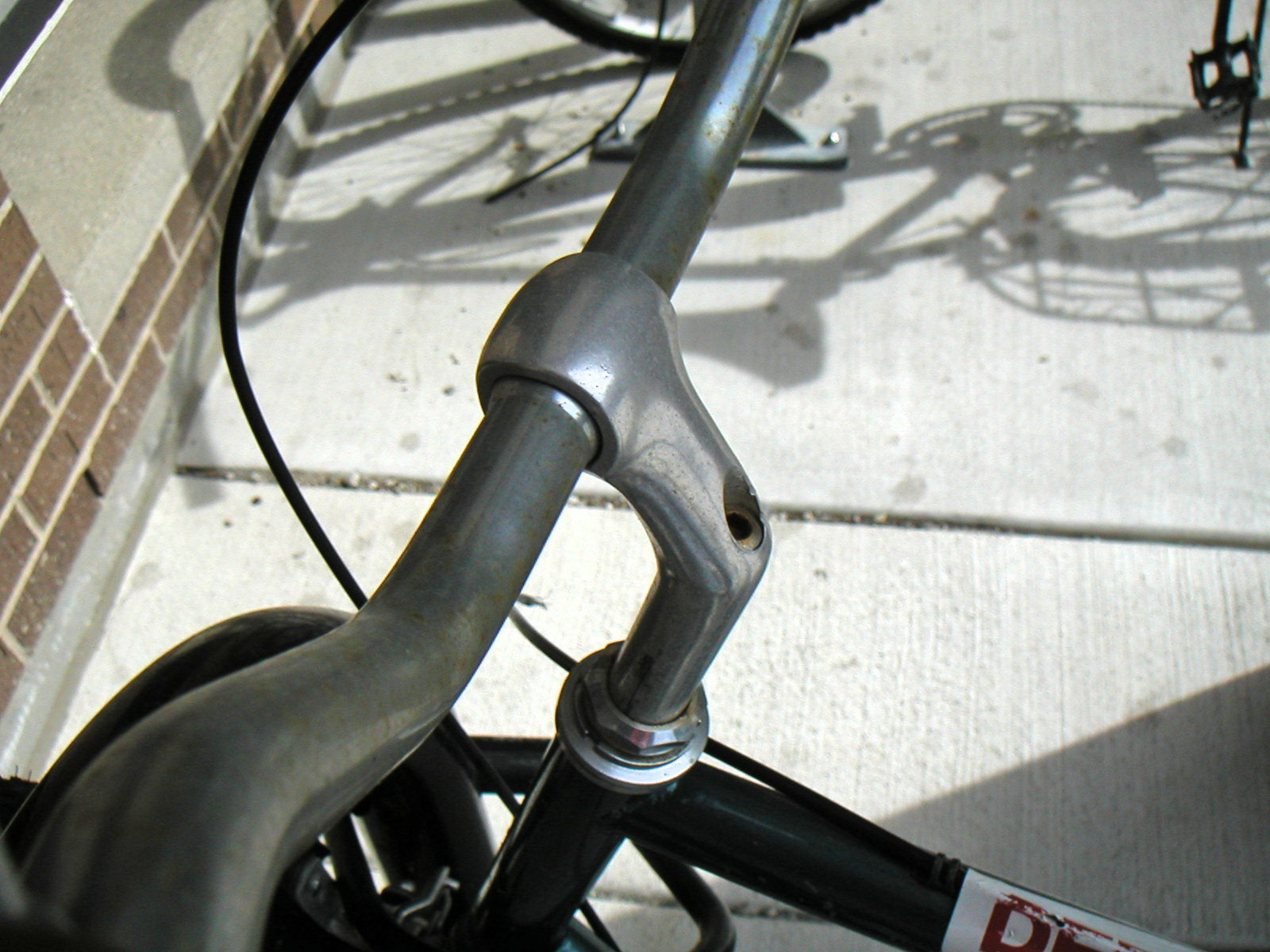
Forged aluminum quill stem without a removable faceplate.

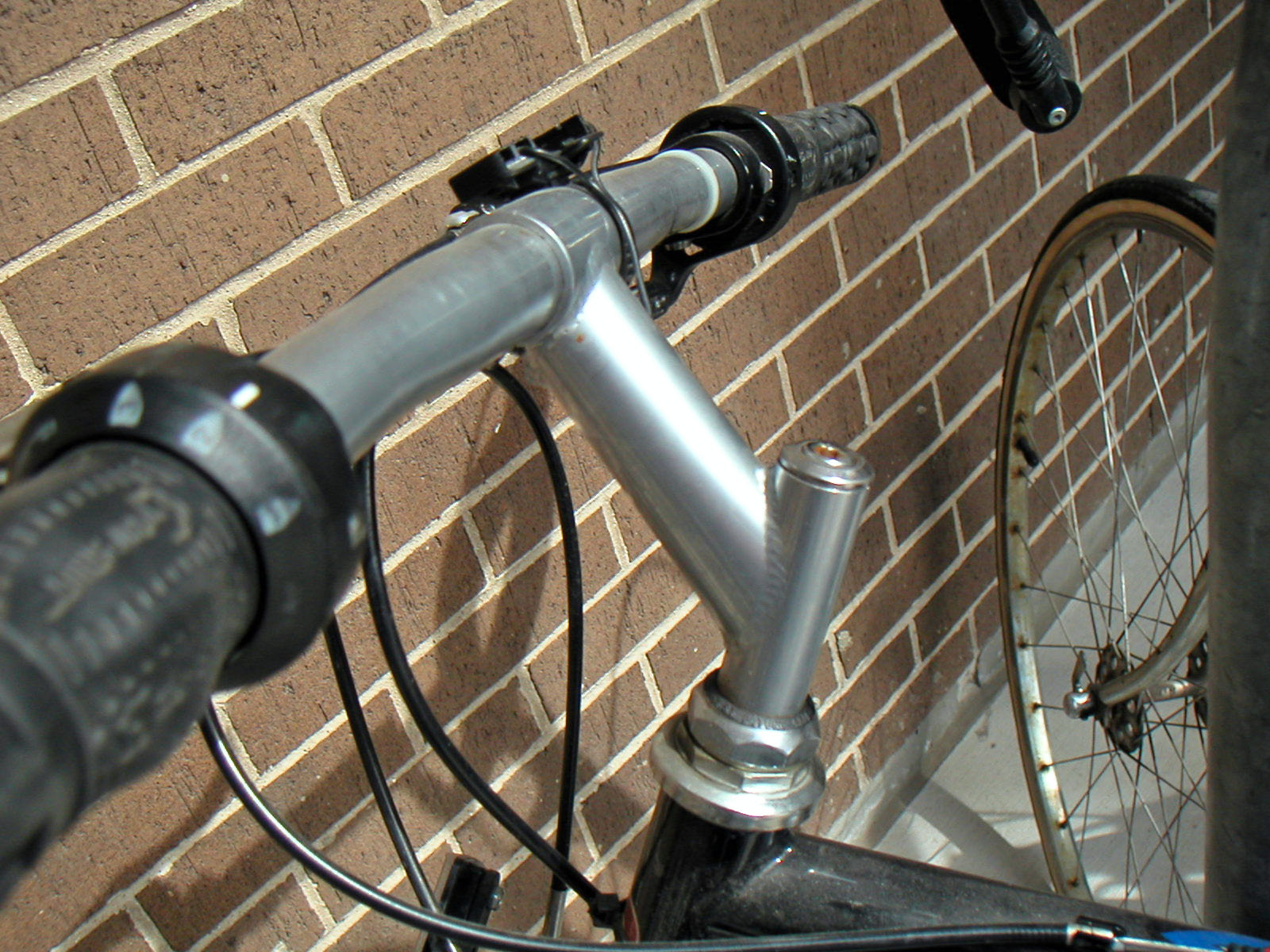
Welded steel quill stem without a removable faceplate.

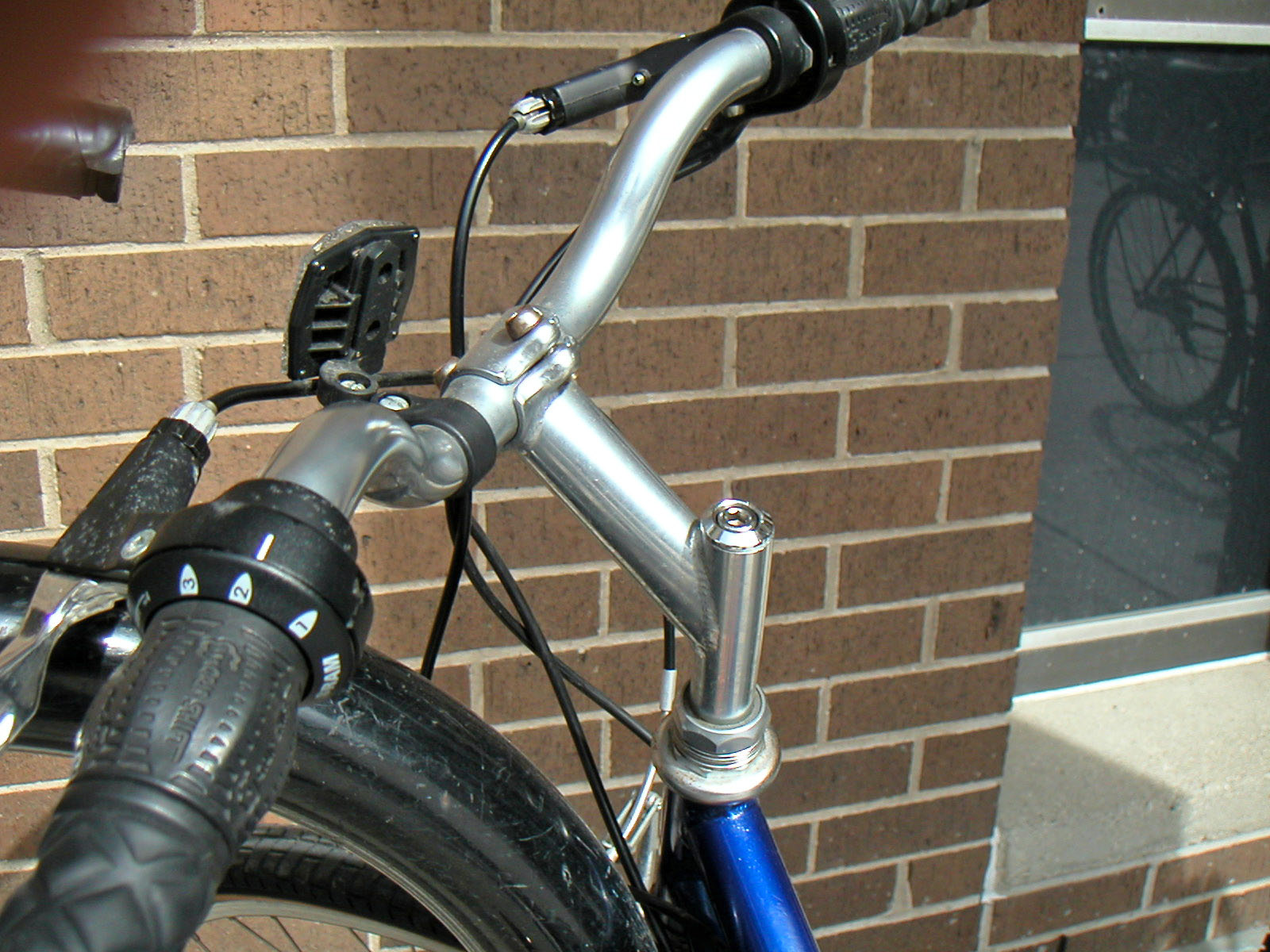
Quill stem with a removable face plate.

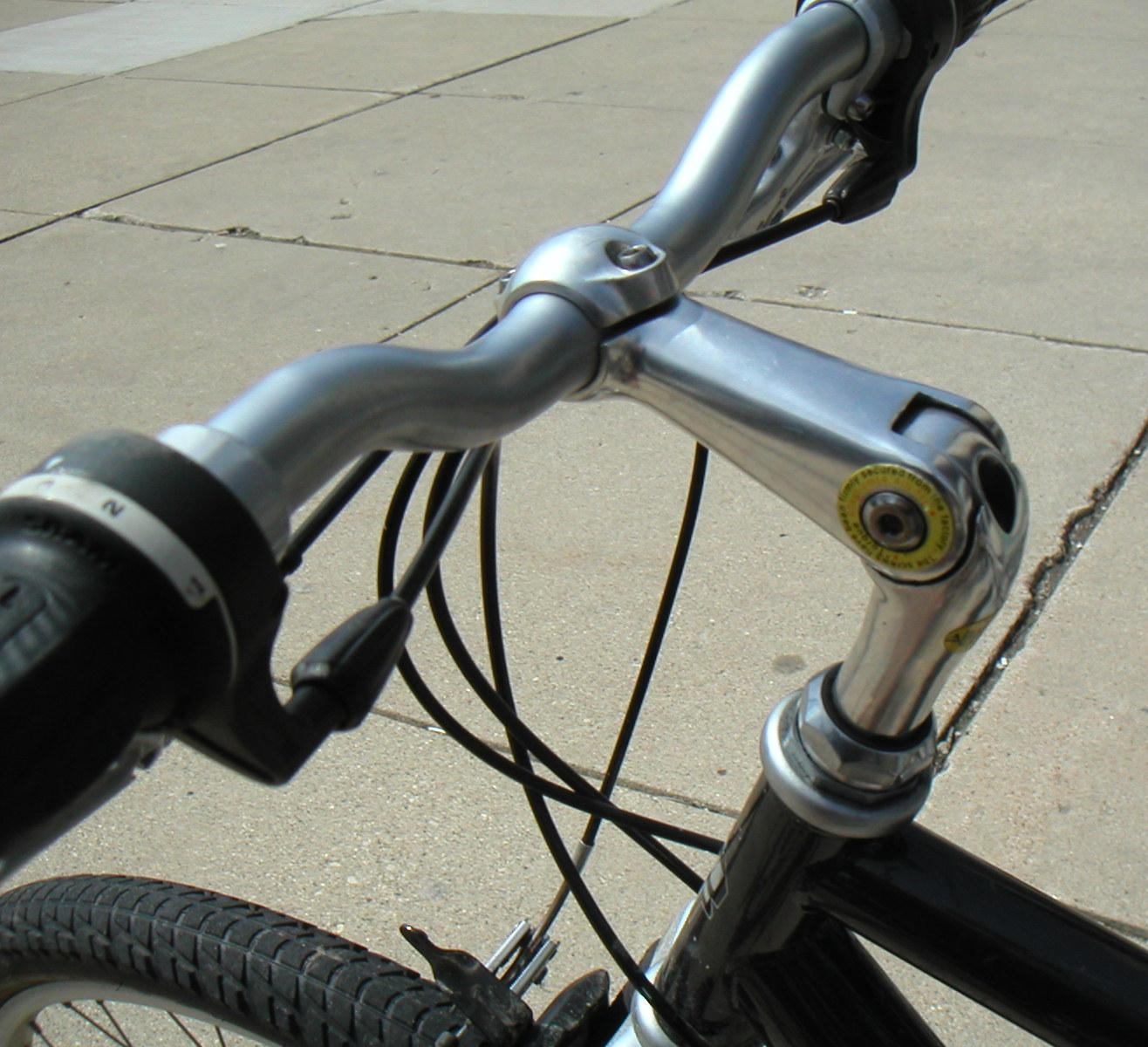
Adjustable quill stem with a removable face plate.

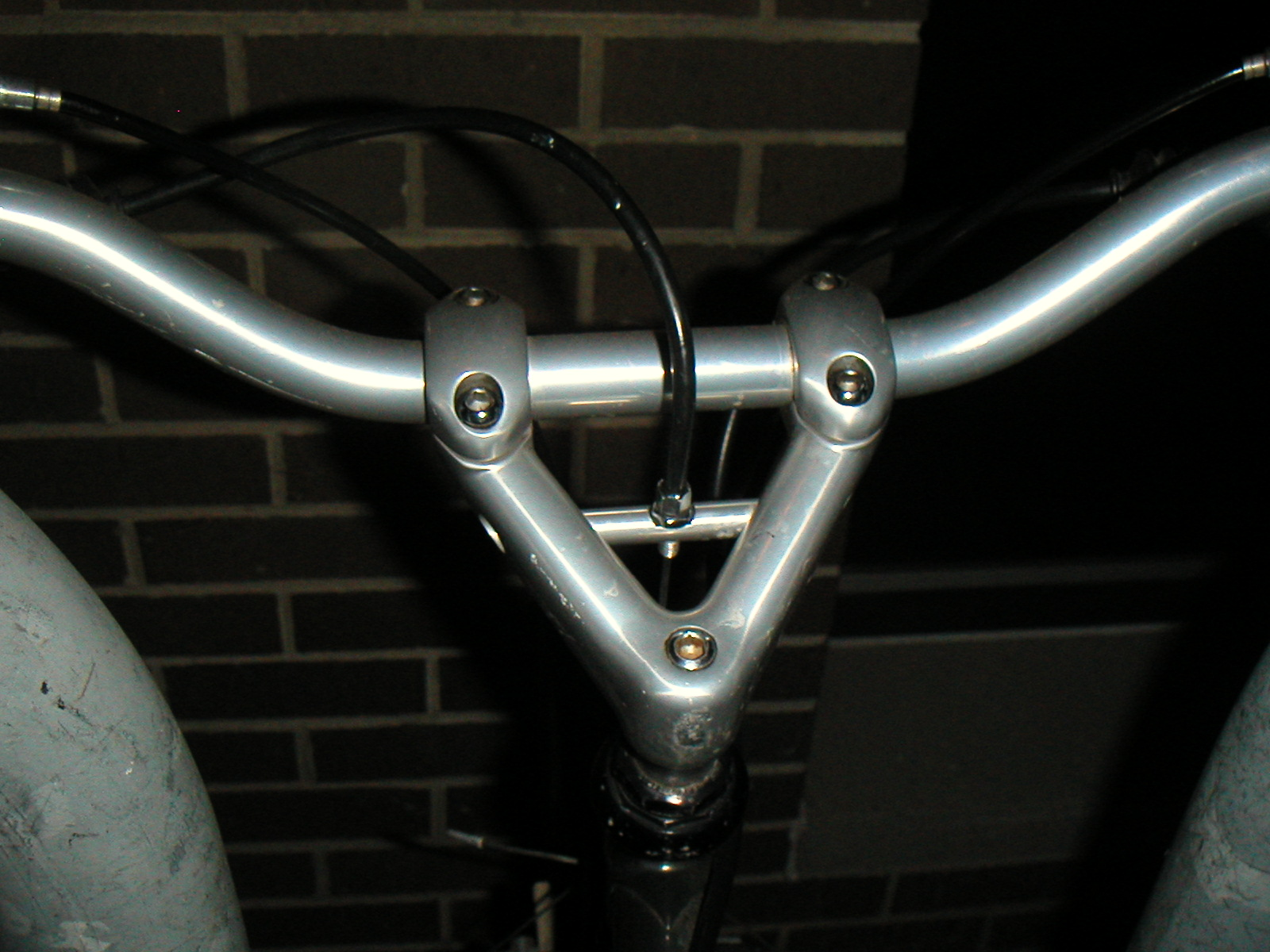
A mid-1980s "slingshot" quill stem with removable faceplates and an integrated brake cable hanger.

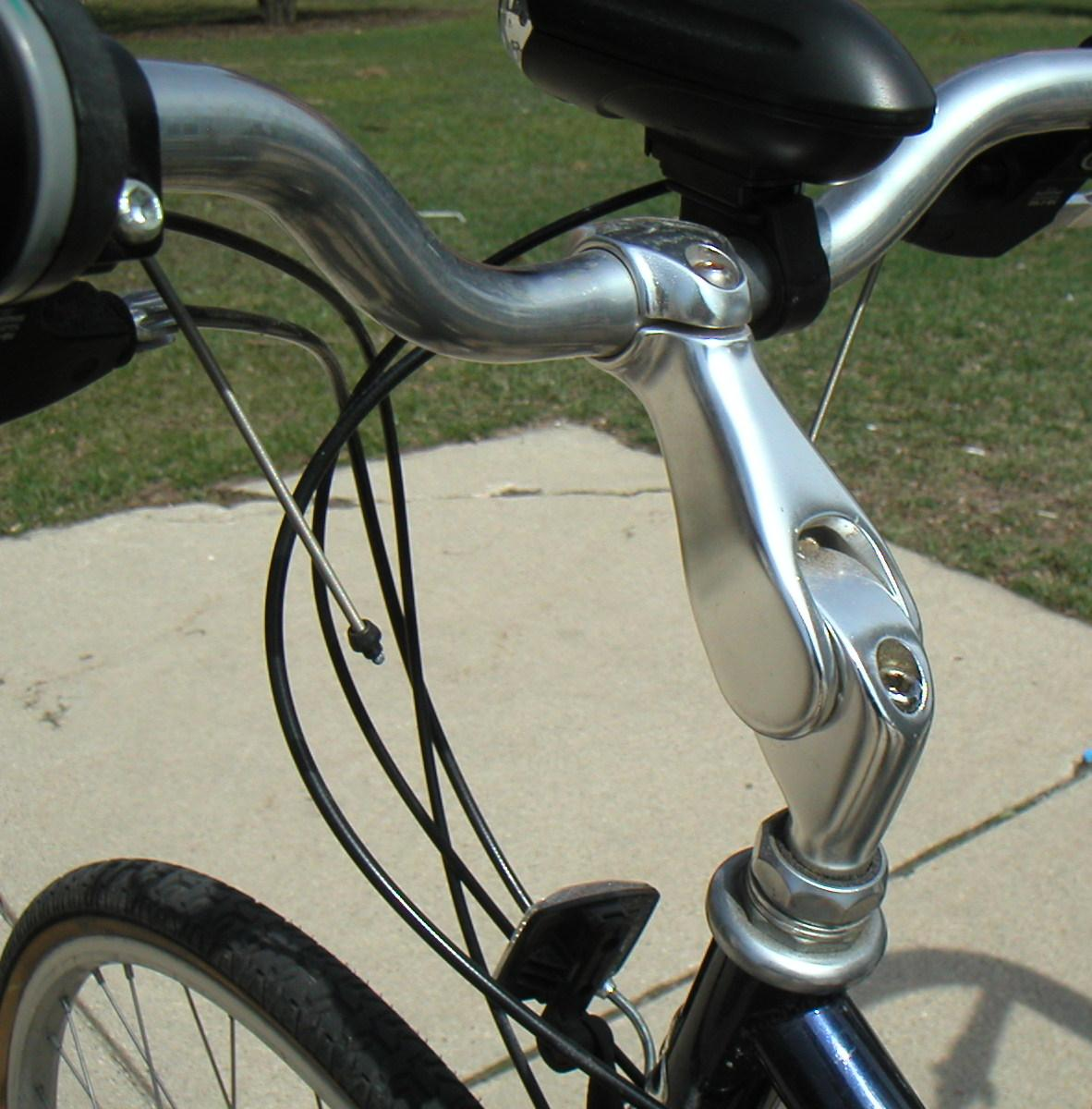
Adjustable quill stem.

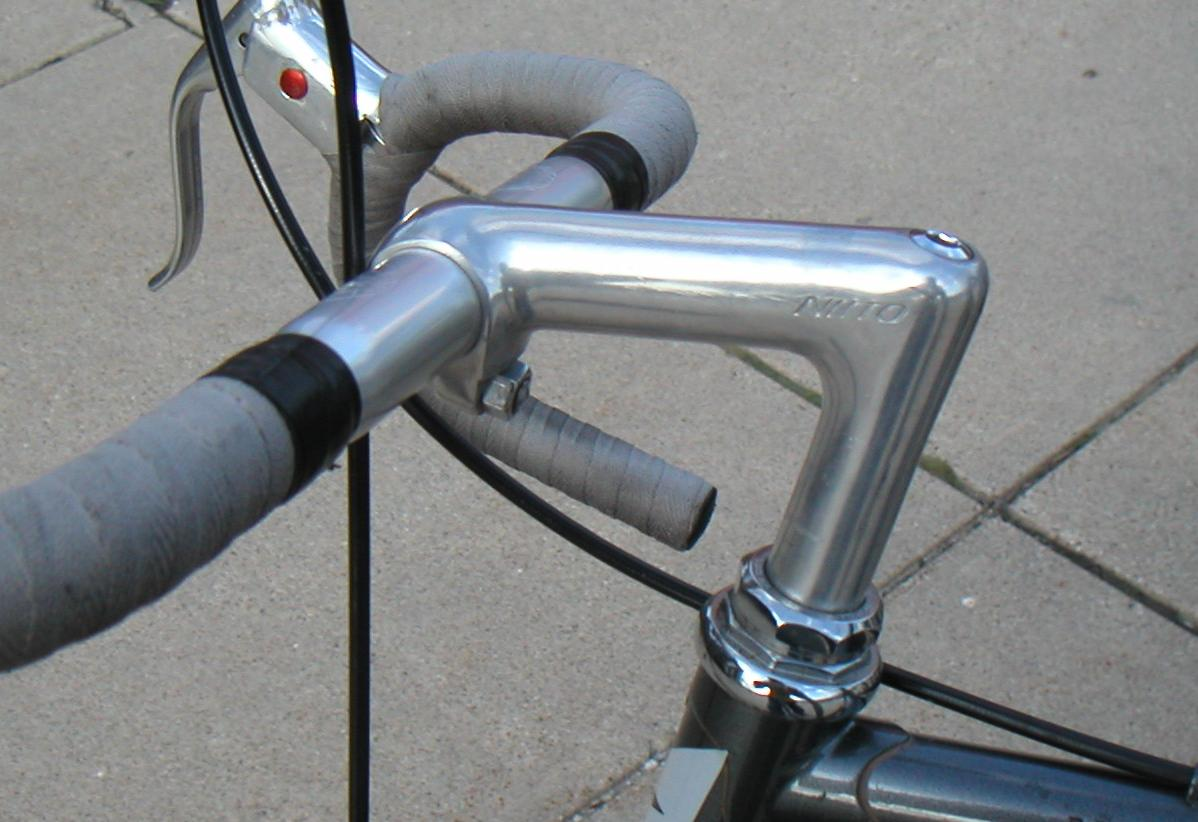
Classic road quill stem.

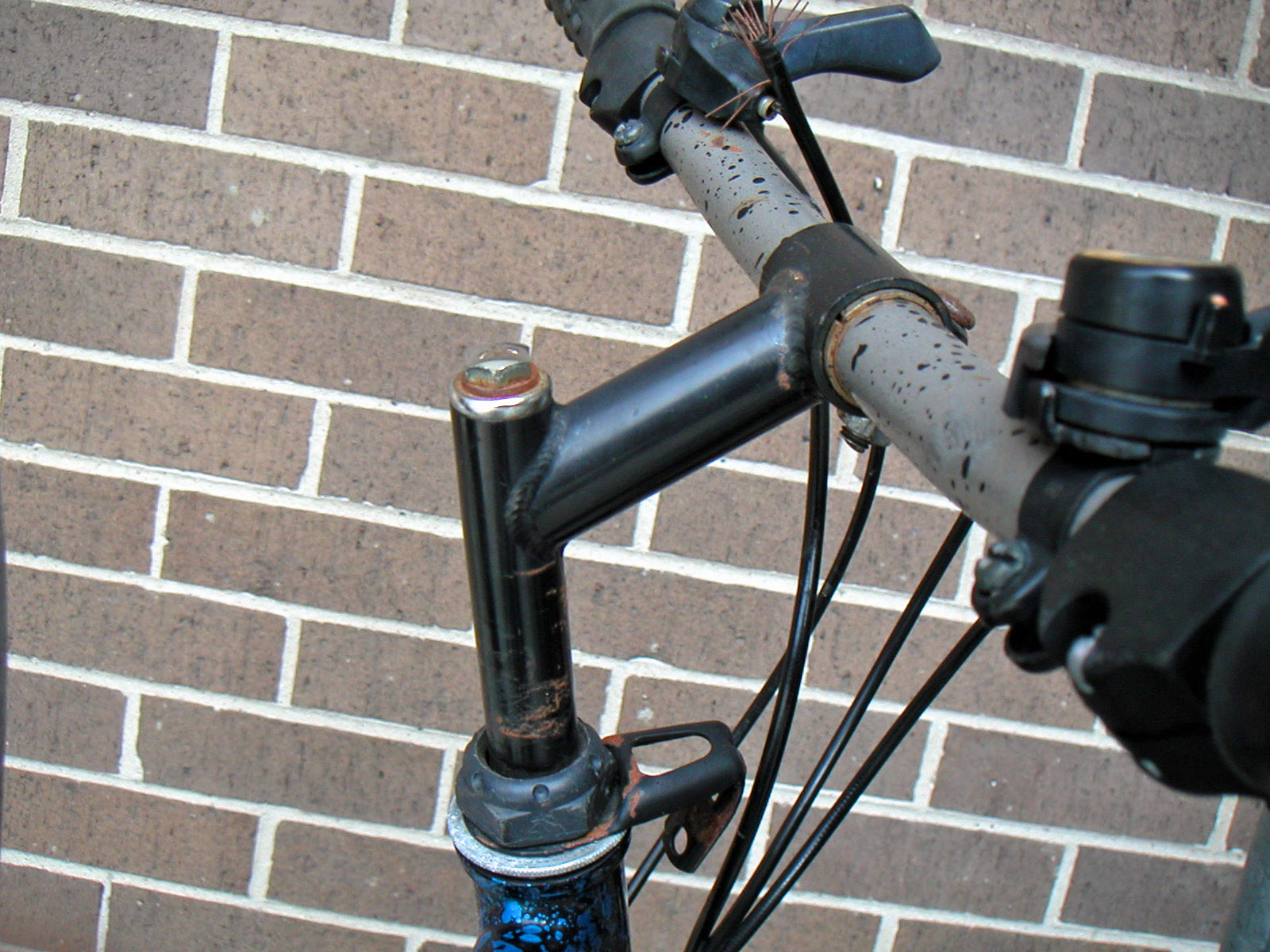
Welded steel quill stem without a removable faceplate.

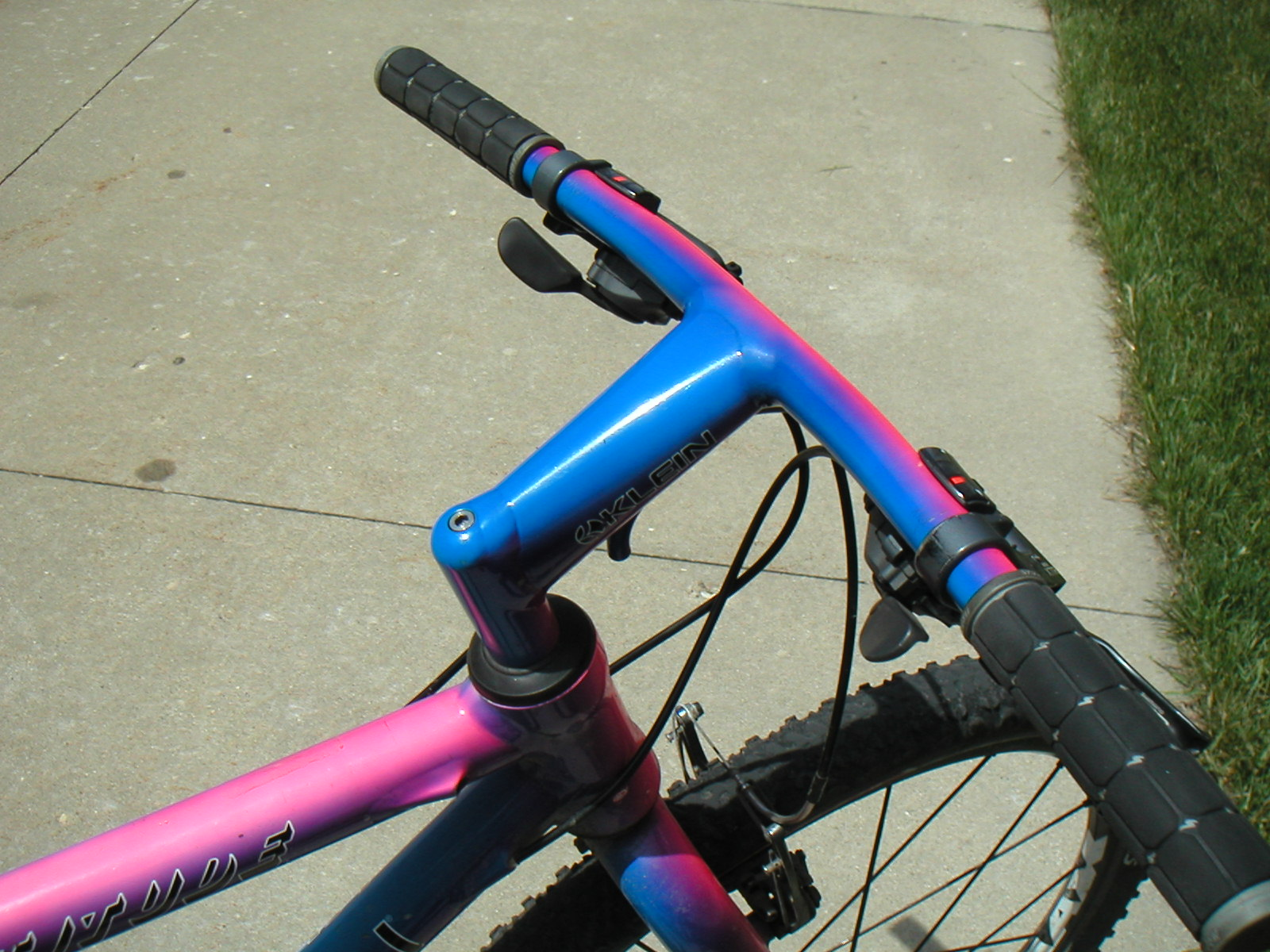
One-piece quill stem and handlebar.

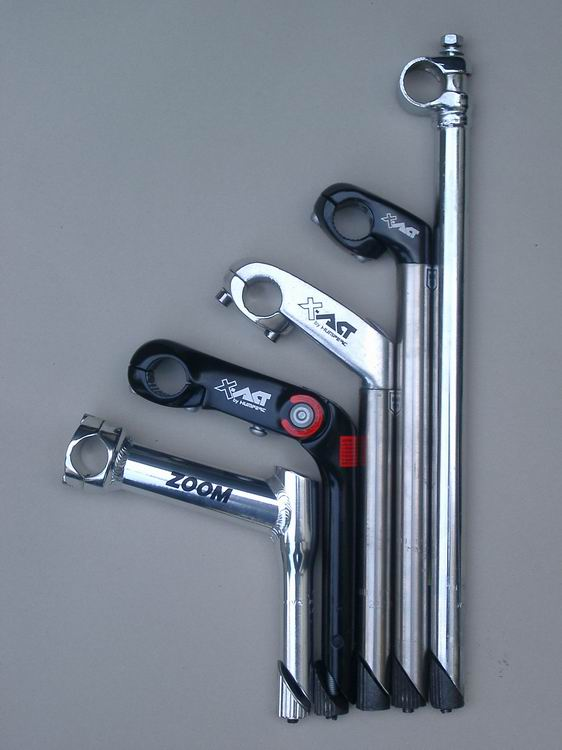
Variations in available stem length.

=== Threadless stems ===
Threadless stems, the newer of the two styles, are widely popular and have displaced quill stems as the industry standard on sport bikes. Threadless stems feature a modular design where the stem clamps around the outside of the top of the fork steerer tube that protrudes above the headset. Threadless stems are commonly available in lengths up to about 130 millimeters (5 inches).

With threadless stems, a star nut is driven down into the threadless steerer tube and held in place by two barbed flanges. The top cap bolts into, and pulls against, the star nut, thereby preloading the headset bearings. (See: photograph of star nut) Newer model forks, with carbon fiber steerer tubes, use an expander plug instead of a star nut, which once installed serves the same purpose as the star nut, but will not damage carbon fiber forks as a starnut will (by design a star nut digs into the surrounding tube, which, while safe with aluminum, can weaken carbon fiber to the point of failure).

Special adaptors may allow a threaded fork to receive a threadless stem.

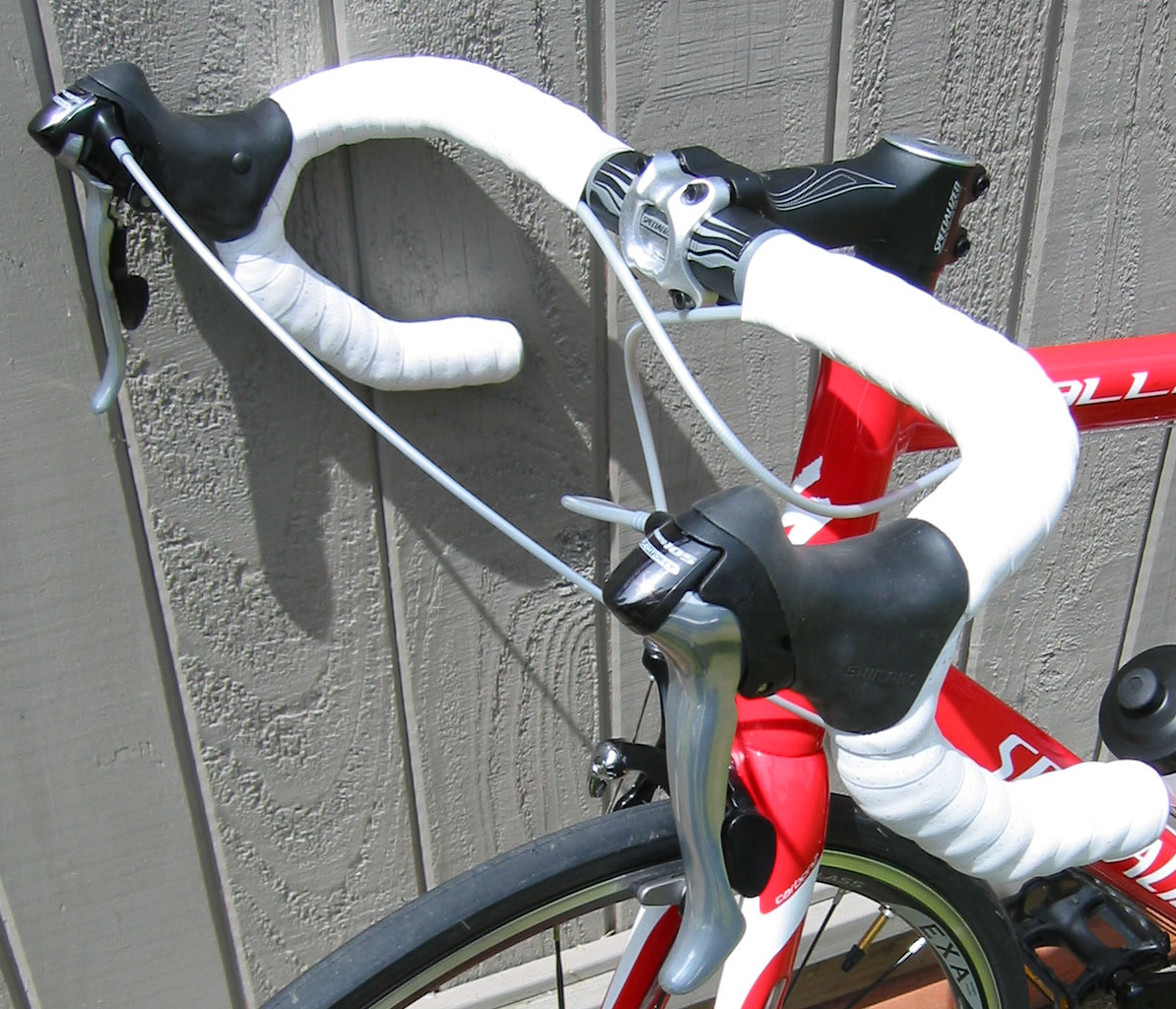
A threadless stem with a removable face plate on a racing bicycle holding drop handlebars.

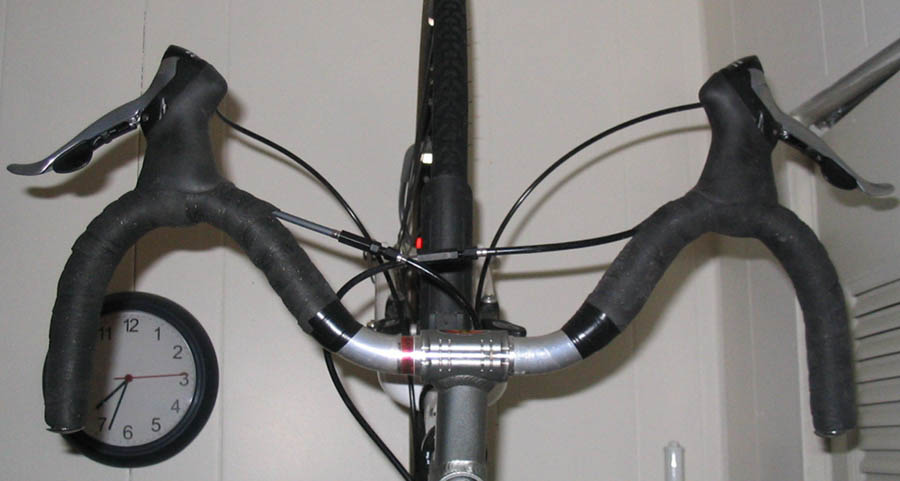
A stem with a removable face plate holding a moustache handlebar as seen from the top of the bike.

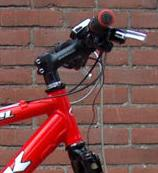
Threadless stem with a removable face plate on a mountain bike.

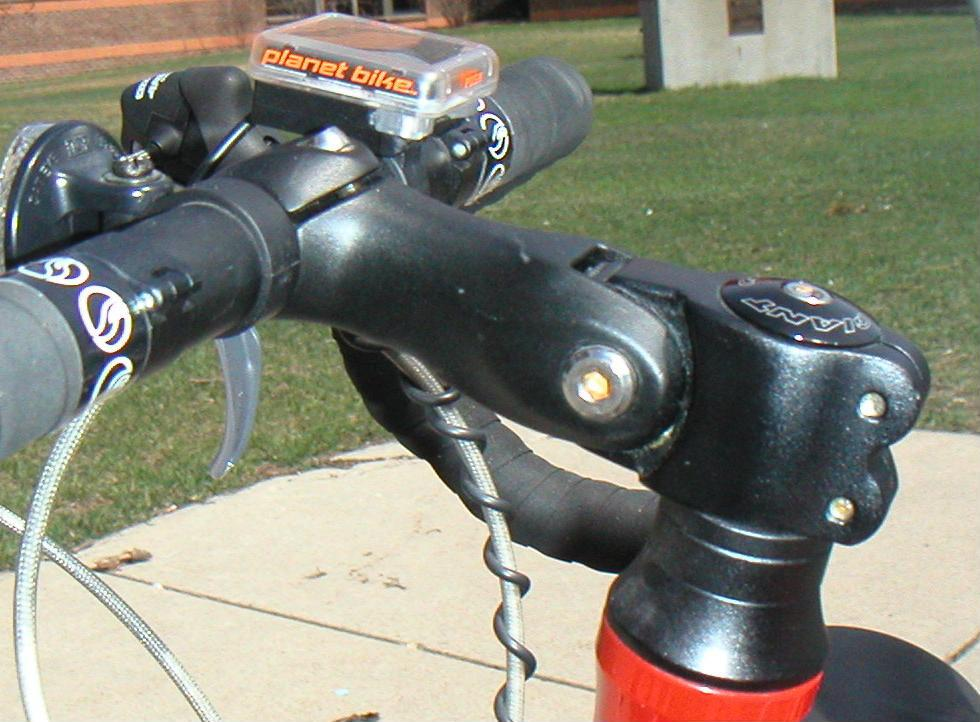
Adjustable threadless stem with a removable face plate.

=== Advantages of each type ===
Threadless advantages:

- Threadless stems offer a simple way to swap, flip, mix, and match stems, which are readily available in various configurations and variations of construction, color, reach, and angle.
- Threadless stems allow for the lighter carbon fiber or aluminum alloy steerer tubes, and hence a lighter overall bicycle.
- Threadless stems can be changed with a single allen wrench. (Some quill stems also use a single allen wrench.)
- The threadless stem's centering can be adjusted without disturbing the handlebar height.
- Threadless stems avoid the internal binding or seizing possible with a quill stem's wedge or cone bolt.

Quill advantages:

- Quill stems offer the ability to make fine adjustments to handlebar height.
- Quill stems can simply be raised, especially examples with long shafts. To raise or lower a threadless headset beyond predetermined (spacer) increments requires another stem.
- Quill stems may offer a slender, smoother appearance compared to the multi-piece, jointed appearance of a threadless stem.
- Quill stems can be removed without disrupting the headset.

== Stem construction ==
=== Materials ===
Stems are often constructed of aluminum alloy, but are also available in steel, titanium, carbon fiber, and aluminum alloy wrapped in carbon fiber.

=== Handlebar attachment ===
Stems tighten around and hold the handlebar either by pinch bolts, which require 'feeding' the handlebar through the stem after removing controls, accessories and bar covering; or via detachable faceplates, also called pillow blocks, especially on BMX bicycles, which allow a handlebar with controls, accessories or bar covering to be removed intact. Stems with faceplates or pillow blocks are known as pop-top stems.

=== Dimensions ===
Stems normally have two dimensions that affect bicycle fit: an angle and a forward length or extension. Quill stems may also have a height (above minimum insertion mark). Stems must also be compatible with the dimensions of the components that they connect, namely the handlebar clamp diameter and steerer tube diameter.

=== Angle ===
For road quill stems, the angle is normally 73° which causes the extension of the stem to be nearly parallel with the ground. Some quill stems also have other angles, e.g. 90°, which results in the stem pointing forwards and upwards.

Newer style stems for threadless headsets come in a wide variety of angles from 0° to 40° and can be flip-flopped, or inverted so that the angle is up or down. So, for example, a 17° stem angled downward would mimic the angle of the typical road quill stem.

There are also models of quill and threadless stems with adjustable angles, although this adjustability often comes at the expense of some lost rigidity.

=== Length ===
The length of the stem determines how far forward of the steerer tube the handlebars are.

=== Minimum insertion (quill stem) ===
Quill stems each require a minimum length which must insert into the headset steerer tube, thereby determining a maximum length that may extend above steerer tube.

=== Steerer tube diameter ===
A stem must be compatible with the dimensions of the fork steerer tube. Steerer tubes come mainly in two common nominal sizes: 25.4 and 28.6 mm (1 and 1 1/8 in). Less commonly 31.8 mm (1 1/4 in) was used on some mountain bikes and tandems and has now returned on some carbon fiber forks, and 38.1 mm (1 1/2 in) is found on high end Downhill bikes.

A threadless stem should match the outside diameter of the steerer tube; a reducing shim may be employed to match a 28.6 mm (1 1/8 in) stem to a 25.4 mm (1 in) steerer tube. On the other hand, a quill stem must be sized to match the inner diameter of the steerer tube. Thus a quill stem made to fit a 28.6 mm (1 1/8 in) steerer tube has an outer diameter of 25.4 mm (1 in). For 25.4 mm (1 in) steerer tubes the quill diameter is most often 22.2 mm (7/8 in) but some older American bicycles used 21.15 mm. Some older French bicycles used 25 mm steerer tubes with 22 mm diameter quill stems.

=== Handle bar diameter ===
Both quill and threadless stems come in a variety of bicycle handlebar clamp diameters. The ISO standard for the clamping area of a handlebar is 25.4 mm (1 inch), which is used on mountain bikes and many Japanese-made road handlebars. However, the Italian unofficial standard is 26.0 mm, which is the most common clamp size for road bars. There are also intermediate sizes such as 25.8 mm to try to achieve compatibility with either an ISO or Italian stem, and the old Cinelli-specific size of 26.4 mm. In practice, many modern stems with removable faceplates allow for slight differences in handlebar clamp diameter, but the older type of stem with a single pinch bolt must be accurately matched. In the days of quill stems, a road stem was clearly identifiable from its "number 7" shape, but nowadays it can be hard to tell the difference between a "road" (26.0 mm) and "MTB" (25.4 mm) stem. Manufacturers frequently omit the clamp size from advertising or packaging.

BMX bikes usually have a 22.2 mm diameter clamp size.

A more recent standard is a 31.8 mm (1.25″) clamp for both MTB and road bars. This is rapidly taking over from the previous mix of sizes, although other accessories such as some light or computer brackets may also need to be oversized to fit the thicker bars. Standard brake levers can be used as it is only the stem clamp central section that is oversized. Shims are available to fit a 31.8 mm stem to either a 25.4 mm or 26.0 mm bar, so many new models of stems are oversize-only.

=== Attachments ===
Some stems have a hole through the horizontal part to support the front brake cable on bikes with cantilever brakes such as cyclo-cross bicycles and older mountain bikes.

== Variations ==
=== Adjustable ===
Certain uncommon adjustable stems have the handlebar clamp unit mounted on a moveable slide, permitting variable fore and aft settings. This adjustable stem was developed by a famous cyclist, Major Taylor, hence they are sometimes called Major Taylor Outriggers.

=== Suspension ===
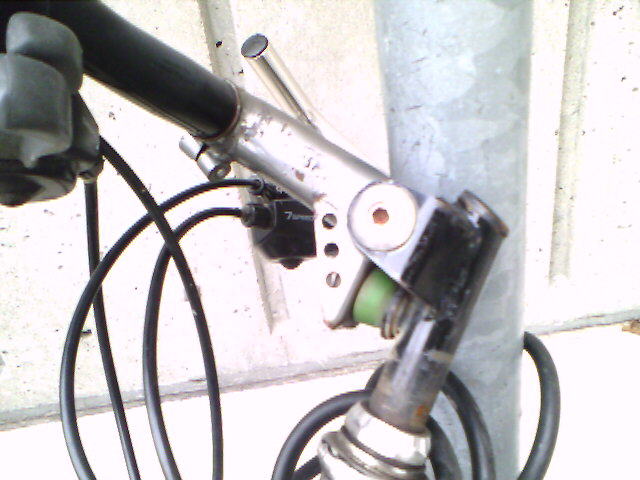
An elastomer suspension quill stem.

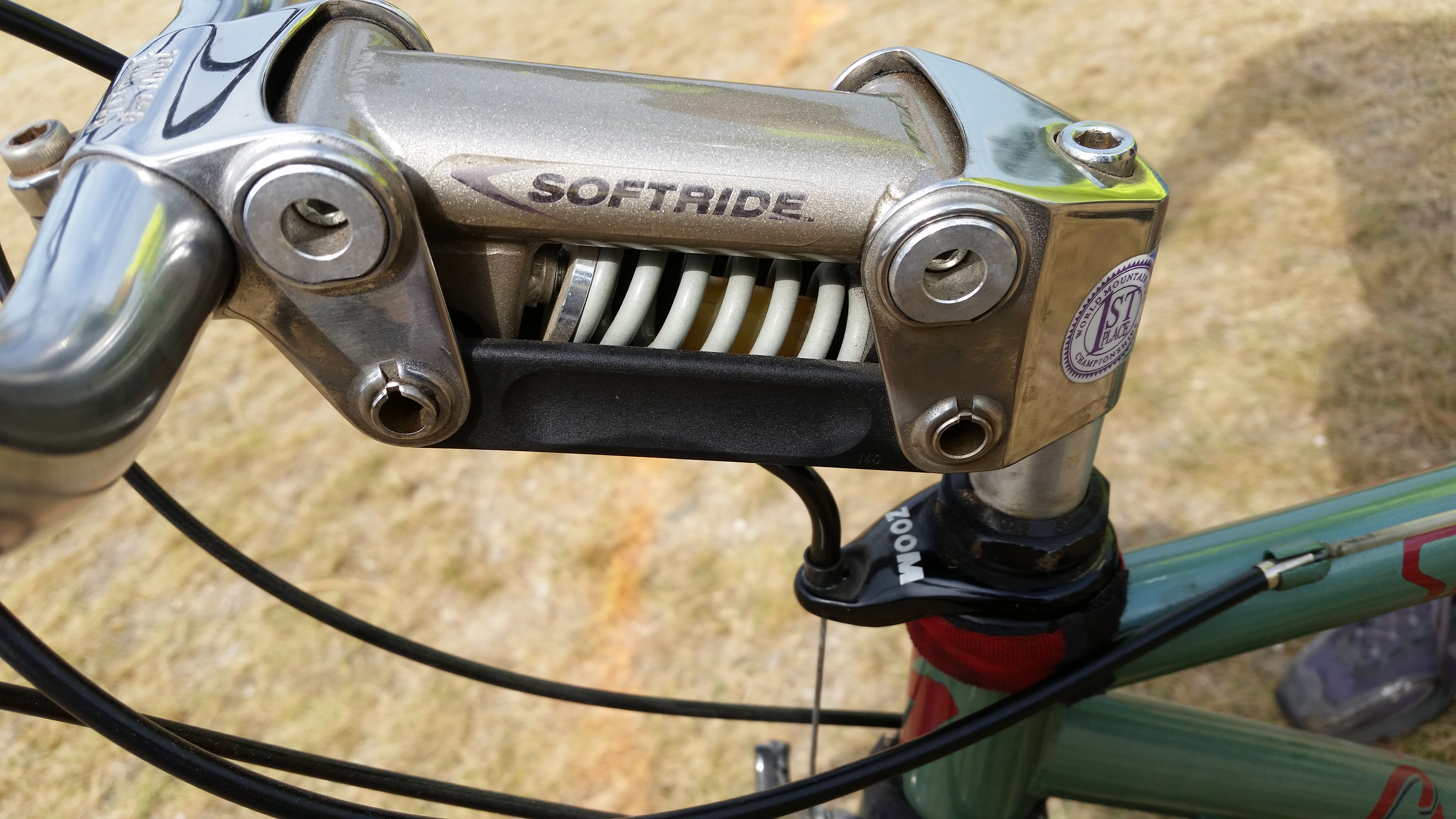
Softride parallelogram suspension quill stem.

At one time, some manufacturers (Softride) marketed suspension stems. Softride's stem allowed for up to 76 mm (3 in) of travel, used a parallelogram linkage, and used a polymer bushing and a steel coil spring for shock absorption.

=== Tandem stoker stem ===
The stem for the stoker (rear rider) on a tandem is similar to a stem for a threadless fork and headset, but clamps on the captain's (front rider's) seatpost. This type of stem may be adjustable in length with one section of tubing telescoping into another.

=== Rotatable ===
There are several examples of stems that allow the handlebars to be rotated when the bike is not in use without the use of tools. Such stems may provide benefits such as the bike taking up less storage space in bike racks or apartments, being easier to transport through doors and small corridors, or as a form of bicycle theft protection. They have also been used on folding bicycles. Most are rotated to the side so that the handlebar becomes approximately parallel to the frame's top tube, with examples such as Revelo THINstem, N-Lock Rotating Stem, Speedlifter Stem Twist SDS and Satori-ET2. Urbancyclo Quicktwist is a start-up company that has designed a stem that can be rotated so that the handlebar points upwards parallel to the steerer tube.

== See also ==
- Bicycle fork
- Bicycle handlebar
- Outline of cycling
