= Fretting =

Wear or damage on loaded surfaces

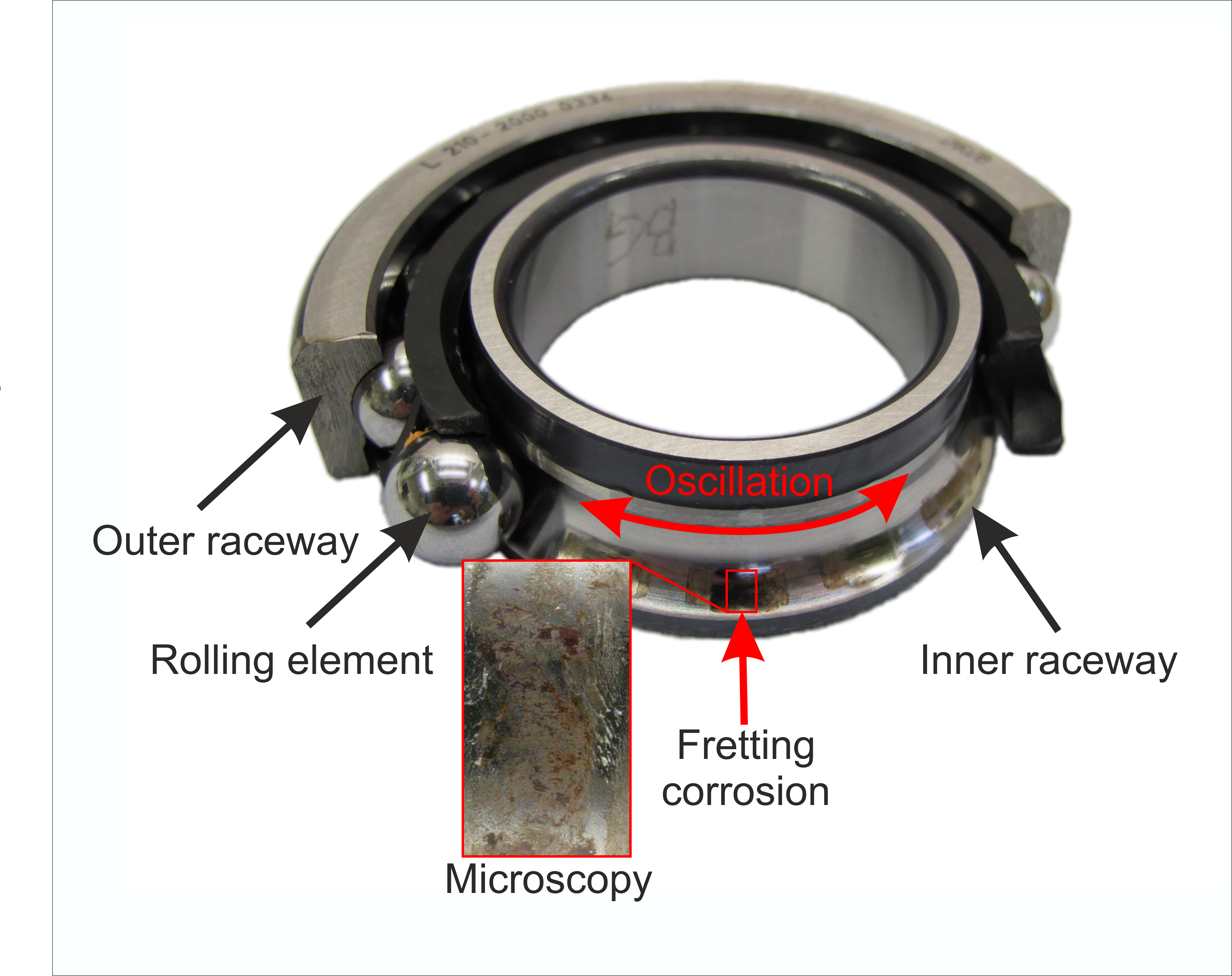
Image of fretting on a bearing

Fretting is wear and sometimes corrosion damage of loaded surfaces in contact while they encounter small oscillatory movements tangential to the surface. Fretting is caused by adhesion of contact surface asperities, which are subsequently broken again by the small movement. This breaking causes wear debris to be formed.

If the debris and surface subsequently undergo chemical reaction, such as oxidation, then the mechanism is termed fretting corrosion. Fretting degrades the surface, leading to increased surface roughness and micropits, which reduces the fatigue strength of the components. The amplitude of the relative sliding motion is often in the order of micrometers to millimeters, but can be as low as 3 nanometers.

Typically fretting is encountered in shrink fits, bearing seats, bolted parts, splines, and dovetail connections.

== Materials ==
=== Steel ===
Fretting damage in steel can be identified by the presence of a pitted surface and fine "red" iron oxide dust resembling cocoa powder. Strictly speaking, this debris is not rust, as its production requires no water. The particles are much harder than the steel surfaces in contact, so abrasive wear is inevitable; however, particulates are not required to initiate fret.

=== Aluminium ===
Fretting in aluminium causes black debris to be present in the contact area due to the fine oxide particles.

== Products affected ==
Fretting examples include wear of drive splines on driveshafts, wheels at the lug bolt interface, and cylinder head gaskets subject to differentials in thermal expansion coefficients.

There is currently a focus on fretting research in the aerospace industry. The dovetail blade-root connection and the spline couplings of turbine engines experience fretting.

Another example in which fretting corrosion may occur are the pitch bearings of modern wind turbines, which operate under oscillation motion to control the power and loads of the turbine.

Fretting can also occur between reciprocating elements in the human body, such as hip implants.

== Fretting in electrical connectors ==
Fretting also occurs on virtually all electrical connectors subject to motion (such as a printed circuit board connector plugged into a backplane). Most board-to-board (B2B) electrical connectors are especially vulnerable if there is any relative motion present between the mating connectors. A mechanically rigid connection system is required to hold both halves of a B2B motionless (often impossible). Wire-to-board (W2B) connectors tend to be immune to fretting because the wire half of the connector acts as a spring, absorbing relative motion that would otherwise transfer to the contact surfaces of the W2B connector. Very few exotic B2B connectors exist that address fretting by: incorporating springs into the individual contacts or using a finger-trap design to greatly increase the contact area. A connector design that contacts all four sides of a square pin instead of just one or two can delay the inevitable fretting some amount. Keeping contacts clean and lubricated also offers some longevity.

Contact fretting can change the impedance of a B2B connector from milliohms to ohms in just minutes when vibration is present. The relatively soft and thin gold plating used on most high-quality electrical connectors is quickly worn through, exposing the underlying metals, and with fretting debris, the impedance rapidly increases. Somewhat counterintuitively, high contact forces on the mated connector pair (thought to help lower impedance and increase reliability) can actually make the rate of fretting even worse.

== Fretting in rolling-element bearings ==
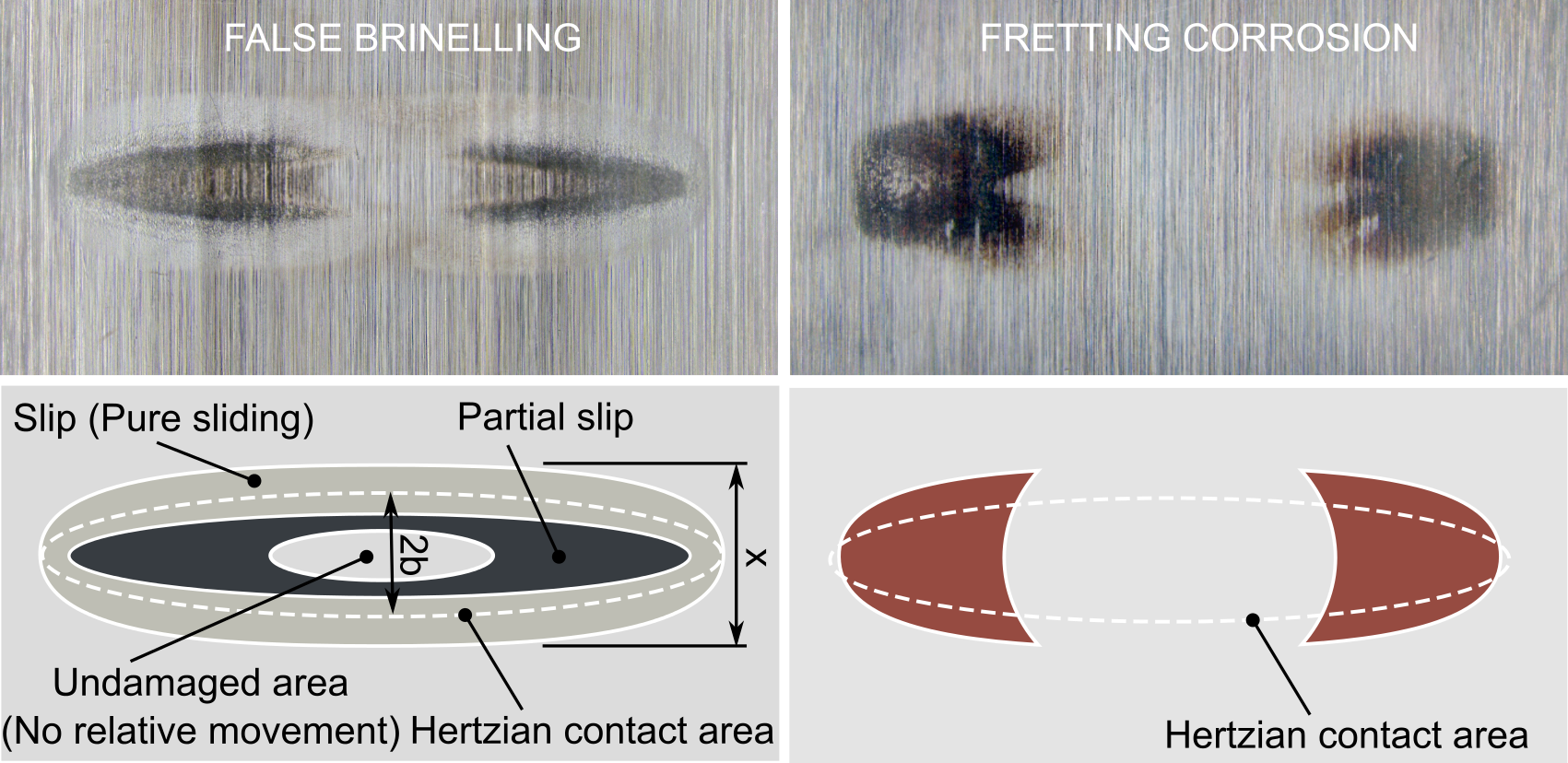
Different areas of typical false brinelling and fretting corrosion damage in a ball bearing

In rolling-element bearings, fretting may occur when the bearing is operating in a mainly oscillating motion and the balls or roller bars are not allowed to roll along the bearing groove as they would if it were a wheel bearing. Fretting action proceeds faster with heavier supported weights. Examples of applications are blade bearings in wind turbines, helicopter-rotor pitch bearings, bearings in motorcycle and bicycle suspension systems, and bearings in robots. If the bearing movement is limited to small motions, then the damage caused may be called fretting or false brinelling depending on mechanism encountered. The main difference is that false brinelling occurs under lubricated and fretting under dry contact conditions. Between false brinelling and fretting corrosion, a time-dependent relation has been proposed.

== Fretting fatigue ==
Fretting decreases fatigue strength of materials operating under cyclic stress. This can result in fretting fatigue, whereby fatigue cracks can initiate in the fretting zone. Afterwards, the crack propagates into the material. Lap joints, common on airframe surfaces, are a prime location for fretting corrosion. This is also known as frettage.

== Factors affecting fretting ==
Fretting resistance is not an intrinsic property of a material, or even of a material couple. There are several factors affecting fretting behavior of a contact:

- Contact load
- Sliding amplitude
- Number of cycles
- Temperature
- Relative humidity
- Inertness of materials
- Corrosion and resulting motion-triggered contact insufficiency

== Mitigation ==
The fundamental way to prevent fretting is to design for no relative motion of the surfaces at the contact. Surface roughness plays an important role, as fretting normally occurs by the contact of the asperities of the mating surfaces. Lubricants are often employed to mitigate fretting because they reduce friction and inhibit oxidation. However, this may also cause the opposite effect, as a lower coefficient of friction may lead to more movement. Thus, a solution must be carefully considered and tested. In the aviation industry, coatings are applied to cause a harder surface or influence the friction coefficient.

Soft materials often exhibit higher susceptibility to fretting than hard materials of a similar type. The hardness ratio of the two sliding materials also has an effect on fretting wear. However, softer materials such as polymers can show the opposite effect when they capture hard debris which becomes embedded in their bearing surfaces. They then act as a very effective abrasive agent, wearing down the harder surface.

== See also ==
- Contact mechanics – Study of the deformation of solids that touch each other
- Tribology – Science of rubbing surfaces
- Wear – Damaging, gradual removal or deformation of material at solid surfaces
