= Ibis (disambiguation) =

An ibis is a long-legged bird.

Ibis or IBIS may also refer to:

== Aircraft ==
- Hinkler Ibis, a British two-seat monoplane
- Junqua Ibis, a French homebuilt aircraft design
- Ross R-2 Ibis, an American single-seat glider

== Literature ==
- Ibis the Invincible, a heroic magician appearing in Fawcett Comics and DC Comics
- Ibis (journal), the journal of the British Ornithologists' Union
- Ibis (novel), a 1900 novel by José María Vargas Vila
- Ibis (Ovid), a single extant poem written in elegiac couplets by the Roman poet Ovid
- Ibis trilogy, a work of historical fiction by Amitav Ghosh

== Mascots ==
- Sebastian the Ibis, the mascot of the University of Miami

== Organisations ==
- Ibis (bicycle company), a bicycle manufacturer
- Ibis (hotel), a hotel company
- Ibis Aerospace, a joint Czech-Taiwan aerospace company
- Ibis School, an international school in Bonn, Germany
- Íbis Sport Club, a Brazilian football (soccer) club
- Oxfam IBIS, a charitable organization of Denmark, known as IBIS until 2016 where it joined Oxfam

== People ==
- Ibis Gómez-Vega (born 1952), Cuban-American writer
- Ibis Nieves, contestant on Road Rules X-treme Season 13

== Ships ==
- Ibis (1886), a steamship
- HMAS Ibis, ships of the Royal Australian Navy
- HMS Ibis (U99), a British Royal Navy sloop commissioned in 1941 and sunk in 1942
- USS Ibis, more than one United States Navy ship

== Technology ==
- Interagency Border Inspection System, a United States computer-based system for the law enforcement community
- Integrated Business Information System, a 1980s electronic office system from Plessey
- Input/output Buffer Information Specification, a semiconductor simulation model
- Integrated Ballistics Identification System, developed by Forensic Technology WAI Inc.
- Issue-Based Information System, notation for the Argumentative Design methodology to tackle complex, ill-defined problems that involve multiple stakeholders
- IBIS, an artificial intelligence unit, the villain in the PlayStation 2 video game Silent Line: Armored Core
- In-body image stabilization, a stabilization mechanism built into a camera body rather than into a lens
- IBIS (server), Inferred Biomolecular Interaction Server
- IBIS Interconnect Modeling Specification, an ASCII-based file format
- IBIS, the former trading system Integriertes Börsenhandels- und Informations-System replaced by Xetra

== Other uses ==
- Ibis, Queensland, a locality in the Barcaldine Region, Queensland, Australia
- "Ibis", a song by Can from the album Unlimited Edition

== See also ==
- Ibex (disambiguation)
- Ibus (disambiguation)
- White ibis
