= Bicycle suspension =

Bicycle part

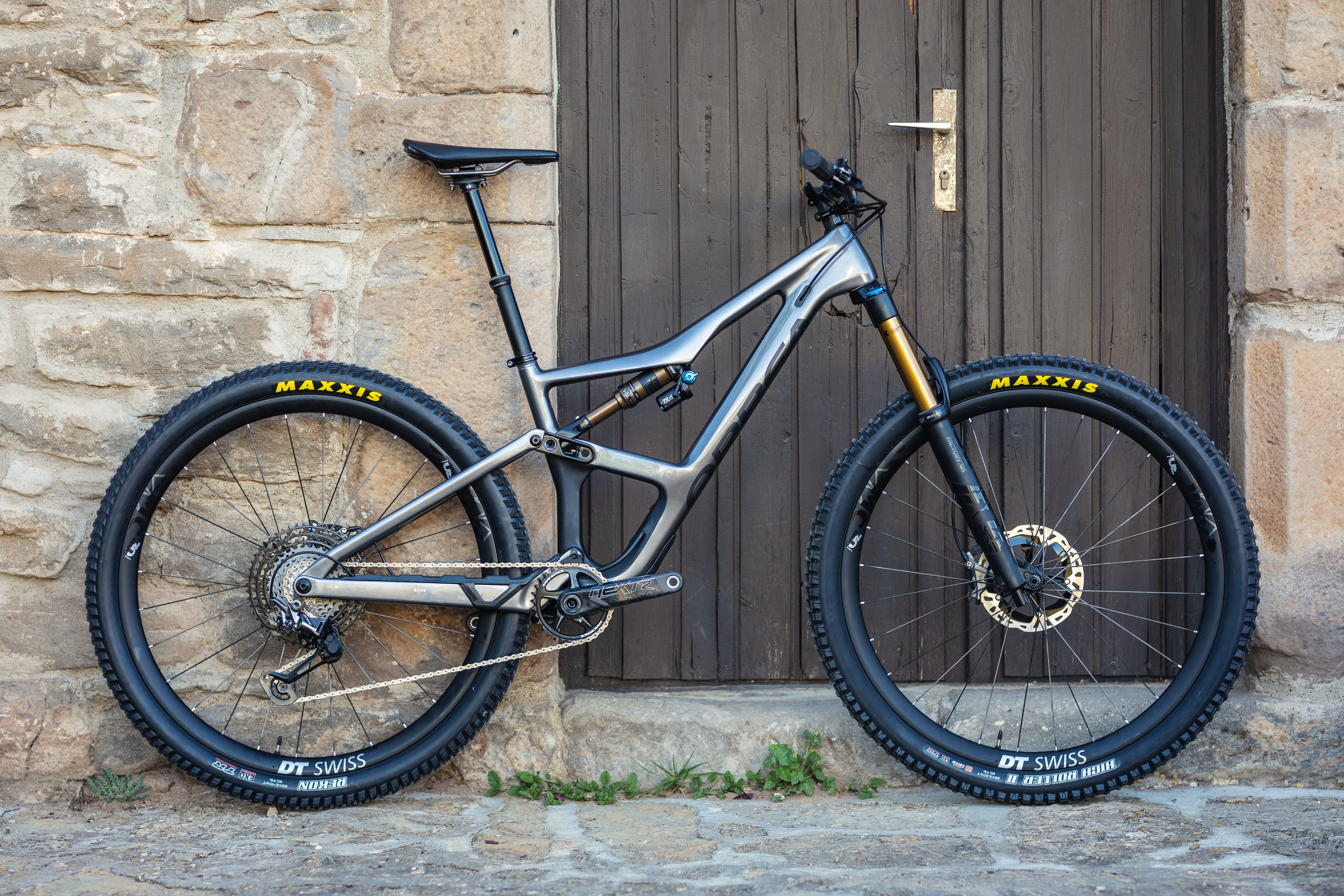
2020 full suspension mountain bike with a telescoping suspension fork and a four-bar linkage rear suspension.

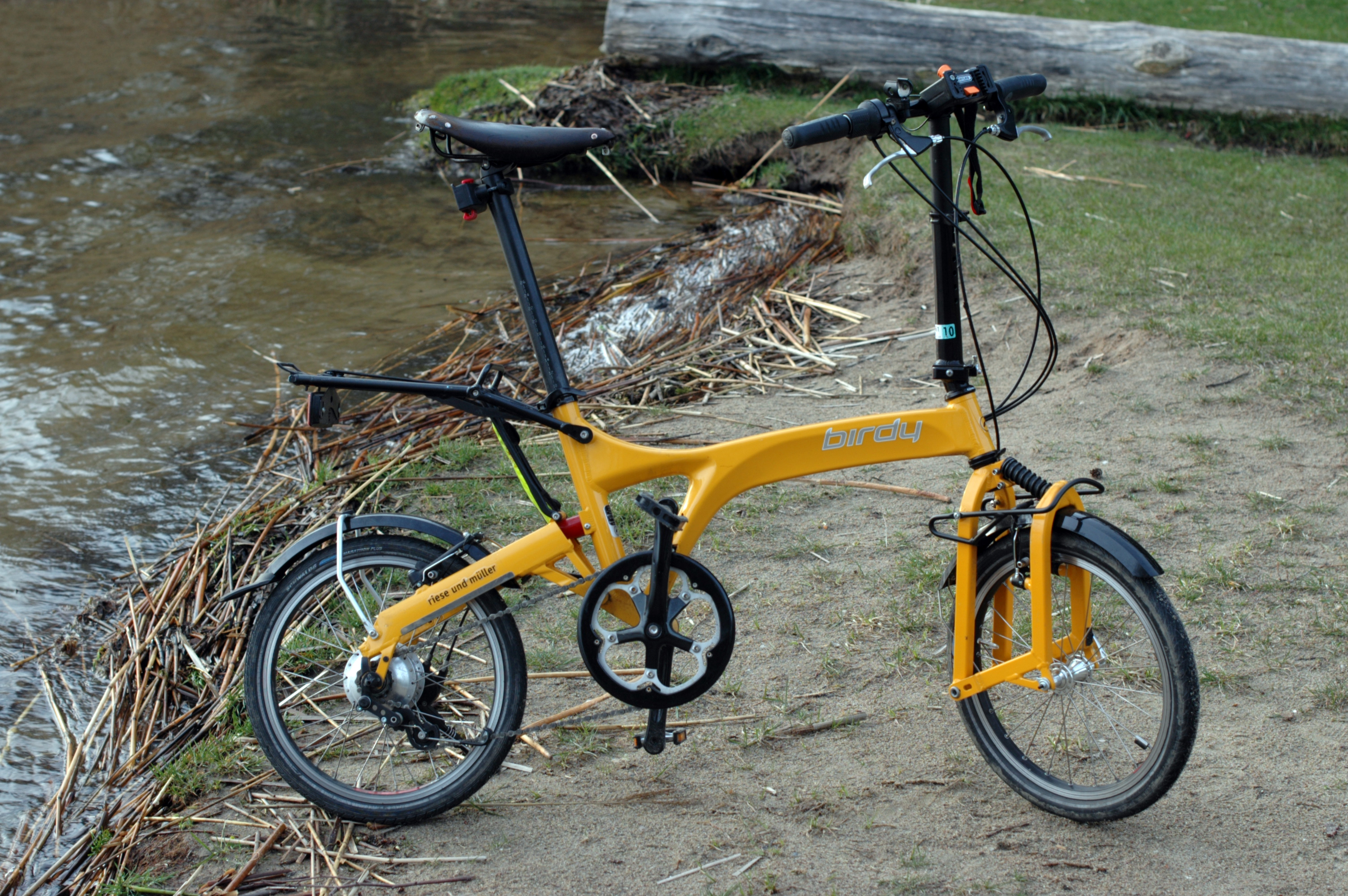
2011 Birdy full suspension folding bicycle with a leading arm anti-dive front suspension and a hinged rear swingarm suspended by an elastomer.

Bicycle suspension is the system, or systems, used to suspend the rider and bicycle in order to insulate them from the roughness of the terrain. Bicycle suspension is used primarily on mountain bikes, but is also common on hybrid bicycles.

Bicycle suspension can be implemented in a variety of ways, and any combination thereof:

- Front suspension
- Rear suspension
- Suspension seatpost
- Suspension saddle (now uncommon)
- Suspension stem

The suspension saddle is now uncommon and is mostly only found on vintage cruiser bikes for comfort over rough roads or today with very niche or cheap aftermarket mods. Bicycles with only front suspension are referred to as hardtail and bicycles with suspension in both the front and rear are referred to as dual or full suspension bikes. When a bicycle has no suspension it is called rigid. Bicycles with only rear suspension are uncommon although the Brompton folding bicycle is equipped with rear only suspension.

Although a stiffer frame is usually preferable, no material is infinitely stiff and therefore any frame will exhibit some flexing. Bicycle designers intentionally make frames in such a way that the frame itself can absorb some vibrations.

Besides providing comfort to the rider, suspension systems improve traction and safety by helping to keep one or both wheels in contact with the ground.

== History ==
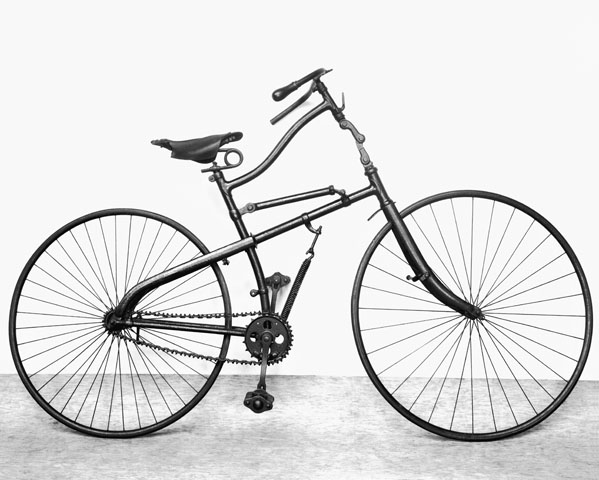
1885 Whippet safety bicycle

As early as 1885, the Whippet brand of safety bicycle was notable for its use of springs to suspend the frame. In 1901 the famous author on bicycles Archibald Sharp patented air suspension for bicycles. He was involved with Air Springs Ltd and they developed an air sprung motorcycle in 1909, but they also loaned an air sprung bicycle to the correspondent to show how good the suspension was.

In 1983 Brian Skinner designed and implemented the first suspension system for a mountain bike with a simple rear shock and a single pivot called the MCR Descender. This bike still had a rigid front fork. Front suspension appeared on bikes in 1990 when the founder of Manitou, Doug Bradburry, designed and built the a front suspension fork in his garage. The fork used elastomers and had no dampening effect, just a spring. However, the stiffness was able to be controlled and functioned well except in cold weather.

The first full-suspension folding bike from German engineers Riese and Müller was developed in 1992 and was launched in 1995 as the Birdy model. It worked perfectly and was equipped with a joint-free aluminum main frame and 18-inch rims.

== Front suspension ==
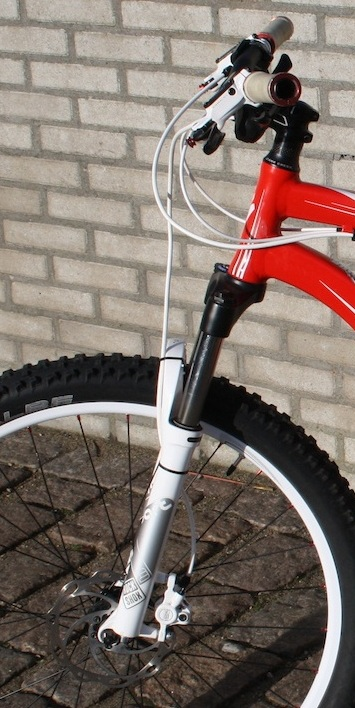
Suspension fork with 100 mm travel on a cross-country mountain bike

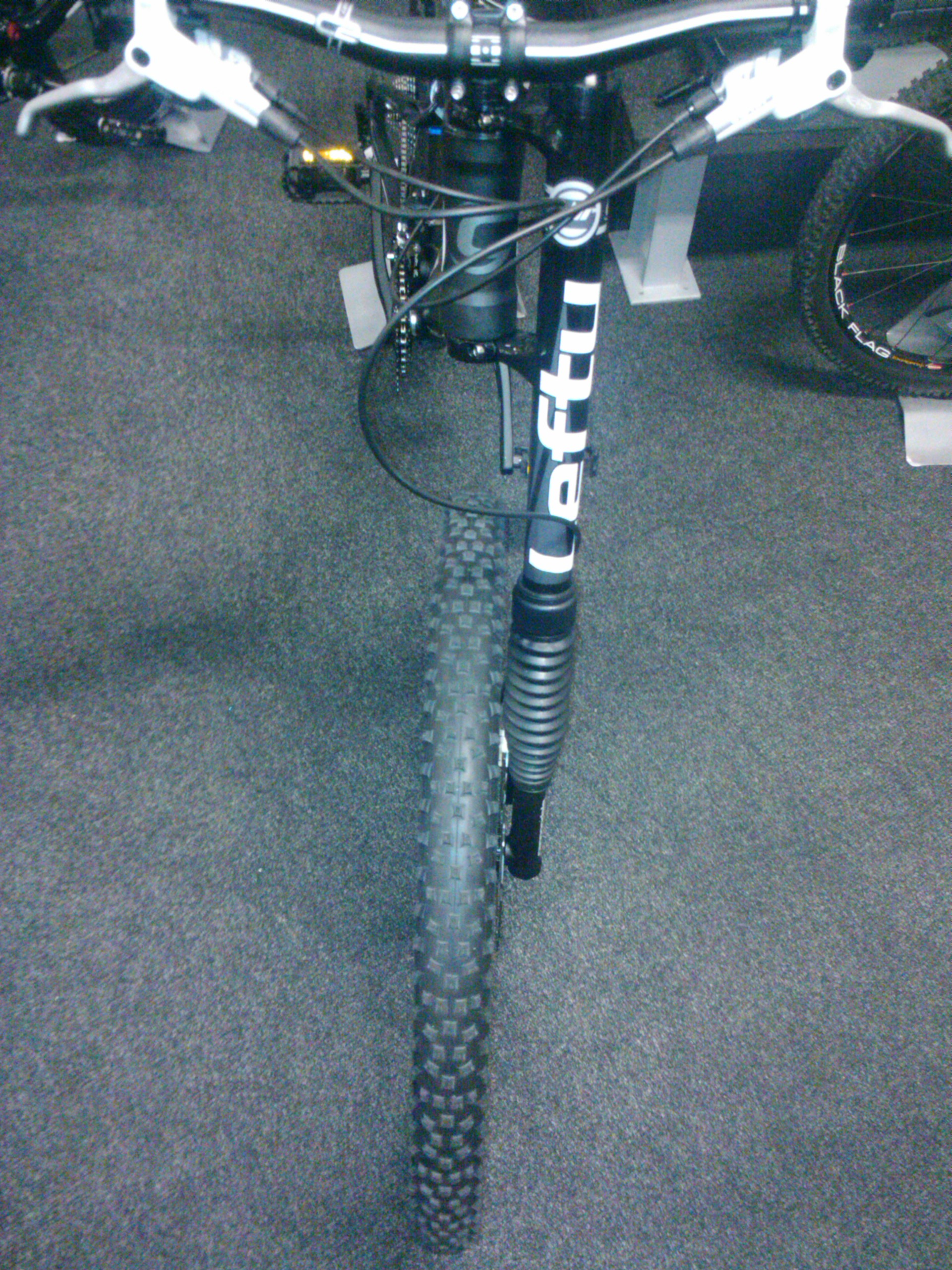
Cannondale Lefty fork

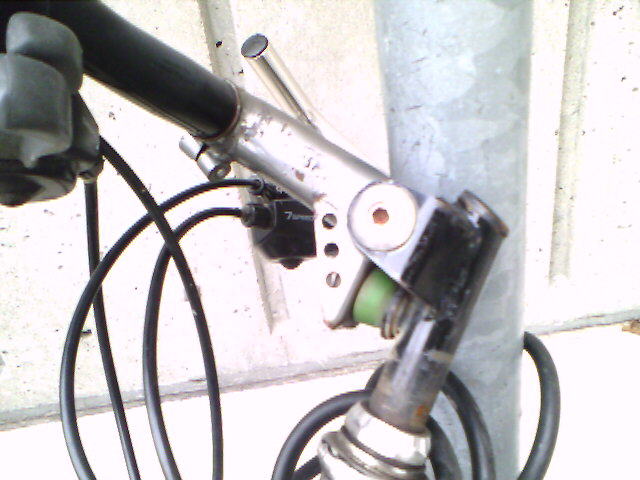
An elastomer suspension stem

=== Telescopic ===
Front suspension is often implemented using a telescopic (i.e., telescoping) fork. The specifics of the suspension depend on the type of mountain biking the fork is designed for and is generally categorized by the amount of travel. For instance, manufacturers produce different forks for cross-country (XC), downhill (DH), freeride (FR) and enduro (ND) riding which all have different demands for amount of travel, weight, durability, strength, and handling characteristics.

Telescopic suspension forks have become increasingly sophisticated. The amount of travel available has typically increased. When suspension forks were introduced, 80–100 mm of travel was deemed sufficient for a downhill mountain bike. This amount of travel is now common for cross-country disciplines, whereas downhill forks typically offer 200 mm or more of travel for handling the most extreme terrain.

Other advances in design include adjustable travel, allowing riders to adapt the fork's travel to the specific terrain (e.g. less travel for uphill or paved sections, more travel for downhill sections). Many forks feature the ability to lock out the travel. This eliminates or drastically reduces the fork's travel for more efficient riding over smooth sections of terrain. The lockout can sometimes be remotely controlled by a lever on the handlebars via a mechanical cable, or even through electronics.

As with all shock absorbers it usually consists of two parts: a spring, and a damper. The spring may be implemented with a steel or titanium coil, compressed air, or even an elastomer. Different spring materials have different spring rates which have a fundamental effect on the characteristics of the fork as a whole. Coil-sprung forks keep an approximately constant ("linear") spring rate throughout their travel. The spring rate of air-sprung forks however increases with travel, making them progressive. Titanium coils are much lighter but much more expensive. Air-sprung forks are generally lighter still.

Air springs work by using the characteristic of compressed air to resist further compression. As the spring itself is provided by the compressed air rather than a coil of metal it is much lighter; this makes their use popular in cross country designs. Another advantage of this type of fork design is that the spring rate can easily be adjusted by changing the air pressure within the fork. This allows a fork to be effectively tuned to a rider's weight. To achieve this in a coil sprung fork, one would have to swap out different coils with different spring rates. However air pressure naturally controls both spring rate and preload at the same time, requiring air forks to have additional systems to adjust preload separately, adding to its complexity. Another disadvantage of air-sprung forks is the difficulty in achieving a linear spring rate throughout the fork's action. As the fork compresses, the air held inside is compressed. Towards the end of the fork's travel, further compression of the fork requires ever greater force. This results in an increase in spring rate and gives the fork its progressive feel. Increasing the volume of the air inside the spring reduces this effect but the volume of the spring is ultimately limited by the need to be contained within the fork. The use of two air chambers within the system has allowed a more linear feel to air suspension, this is achieved by having a 'reserve' chamber that becomes connected to the main chamber when it reaches a certain amount of compression. Once achieved, a valve opens and effectively makes the chamber larger. By linking the two, the force needed to compress the air in the chambers is reduced which reduces the exponential spring rate feel traditionally associated with air systems when approaching the end of the suspension's travel.

The amount of preload on coil-sprung forks can generally be adjusted by turning a knob on top of one of the fork legs. Air sprung designs have various ways of dealing with preload. Several systems have been designed to influence preload, such as separately pressurizing different chambers, or systems that automatically set sag after changing the air pressure.

A damper is usually implemented by forcing oil to pass through one or more small orifices (also called ports) or shim stacks. On some models the damper may be adjusted for rider weight, riding style, terrain, or any combination of these or other factors. The two components are often separated by housing the spring mechanism in one of the fork's legs and the damper in the other. Without a damper unit the system would rebound excessively and would actually give the rider less control than would a rigid fork.

To prevent water and dirt from damaging the suspension, gaiters have been used to cover the fork's stanchions. However even when properly sealing the stanchions and sliders, the gaiters have to have small openings in them to allow air to move in and out of the cavity between gaiter and stanchion as the fork moves through its travel. Some water and grit may find its way in through these holes, staying trapped inside and accumulating over time. Since modern dust wipers and seals keep out water and dirt adequately enough by themselves, and since gaiter-less stanchions are generally regarded as more aesthetically pleasing, gaiters have fallen out of favor.

=== Alternatives ===
Some manufacturers have tried other variations to the telescopic fork. For example, Cannondale designed a shock absorber build into the steerer tube called HeadShok, and a single-sided fork with just one leg, called Lefty. The stanchions of both systems are not round but have flat faces machined onto them which slide on needle bearings instead of bushings, this prevents the wheel from rotating in relation to the handlebars. Both of these systems claim to offer greater rigidity and better feel, with lighter weight. Others such as Proflex (Girvin), Whyte and BMW, have made suspension forks that employ four-bar linkage systems instead of relying upon telescopic fork legs, much like BMW's Duolever. The Suntour Swing Shock fork is based on a coil cantilevered swing set-up, and suspension is given by a coil spring which is located within the steerer tube and can be accessed from the top, technology which was originally used for suspension on early motorcycles.

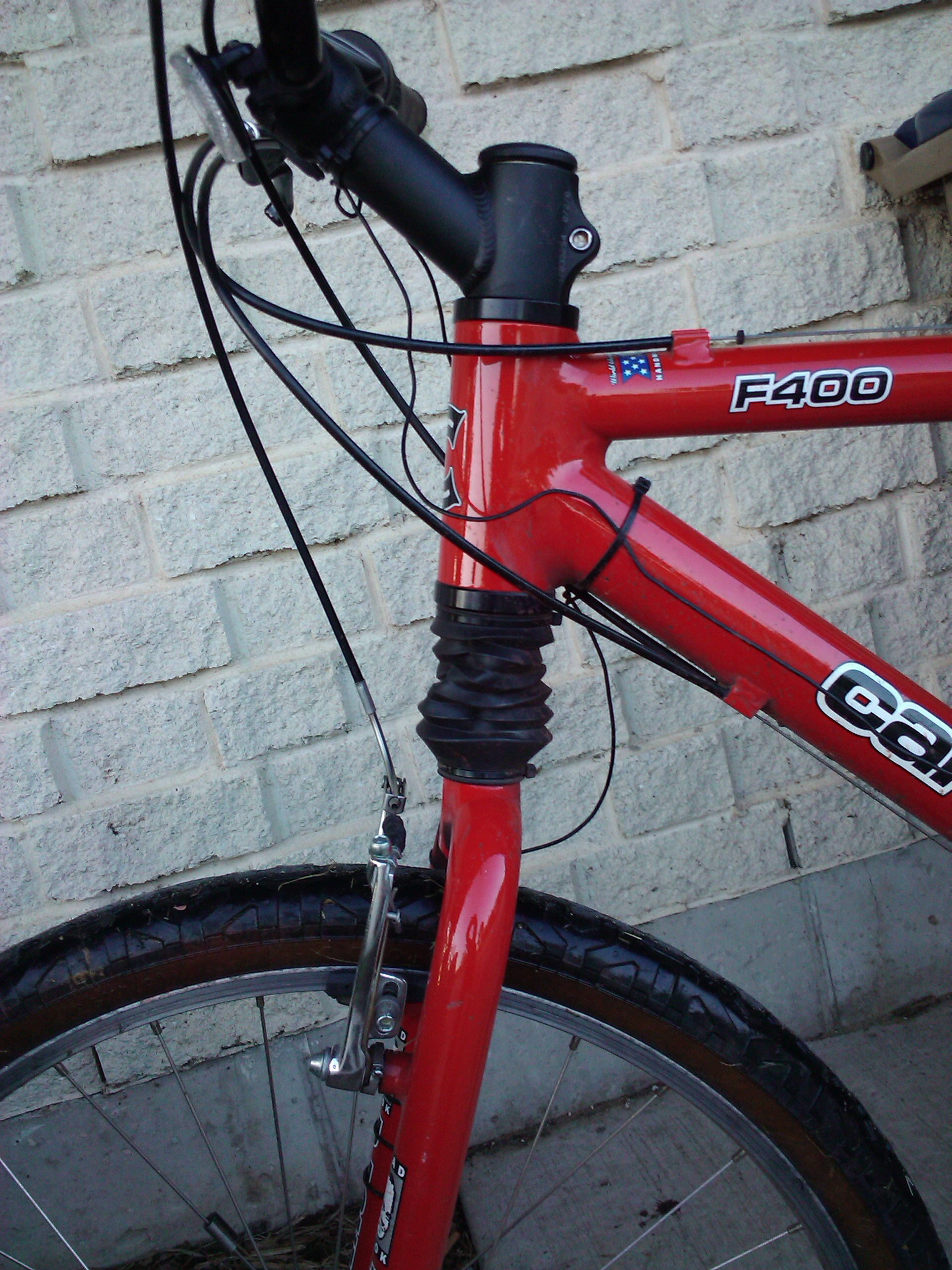
Cannondale Head Shok suspension fork

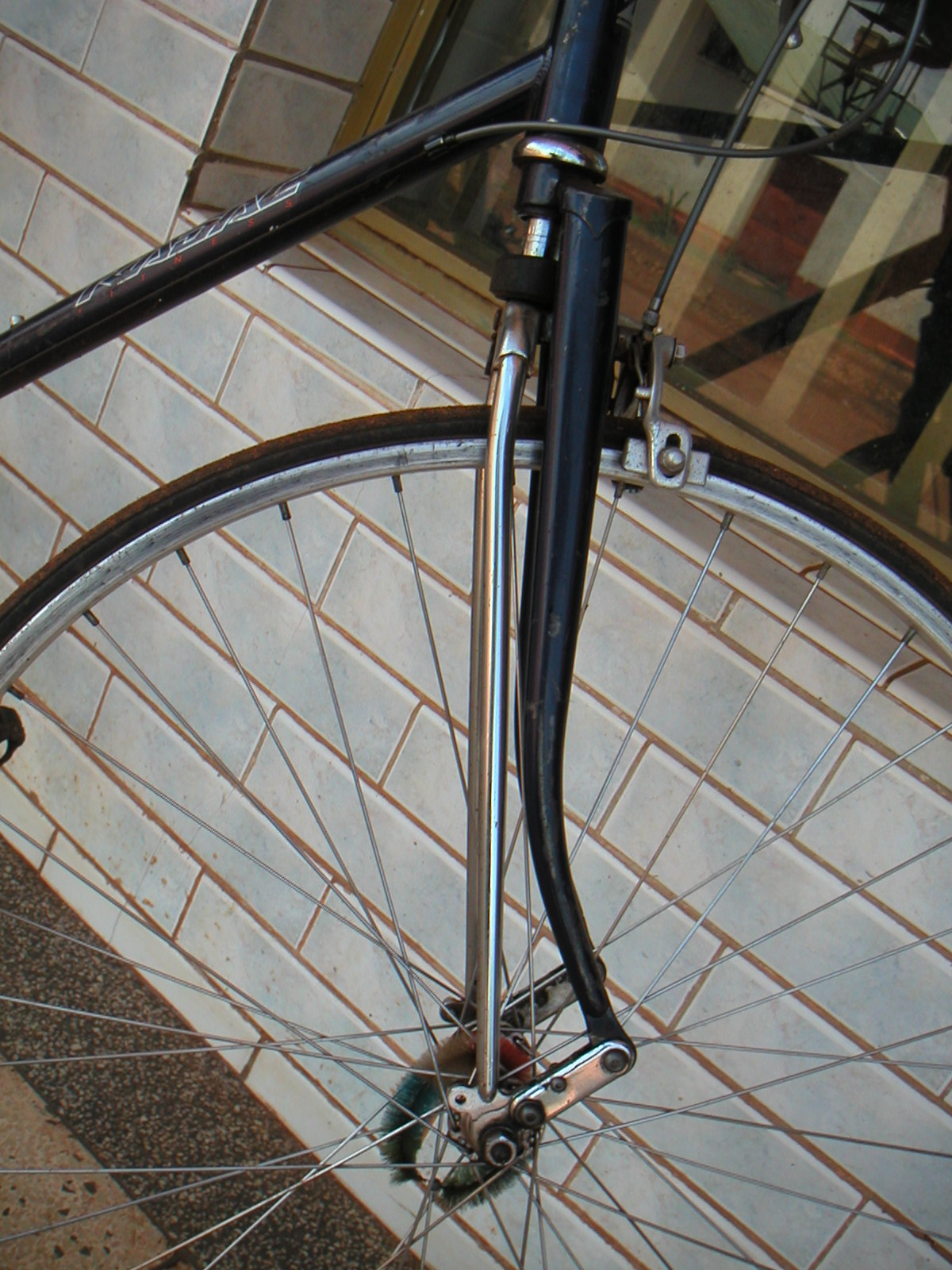
Trailing link suspension fork on a Bridgestone

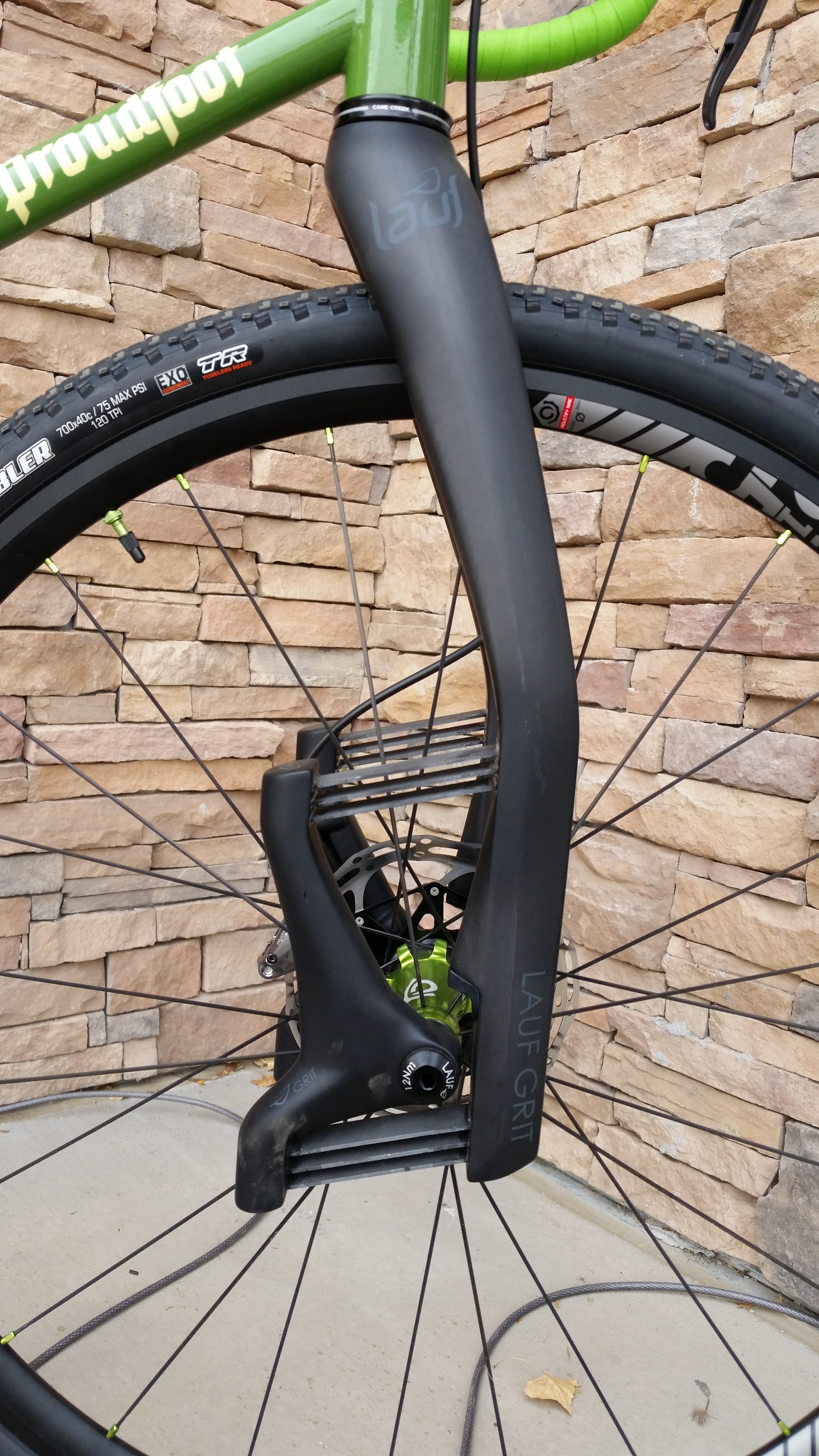
Lauf pivotless, trailing link suspension fork

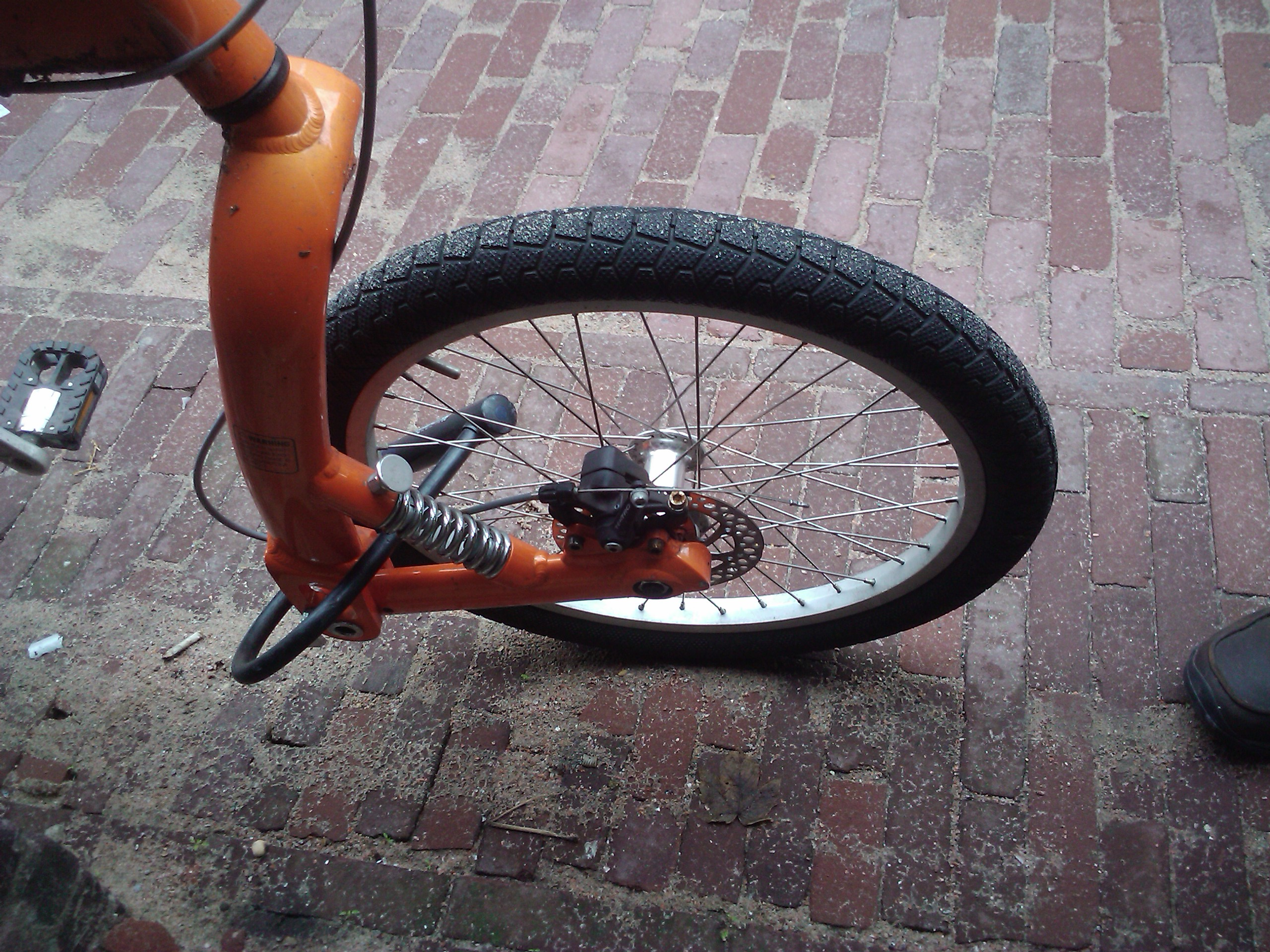
Leading link suspension fork on a BuzBike

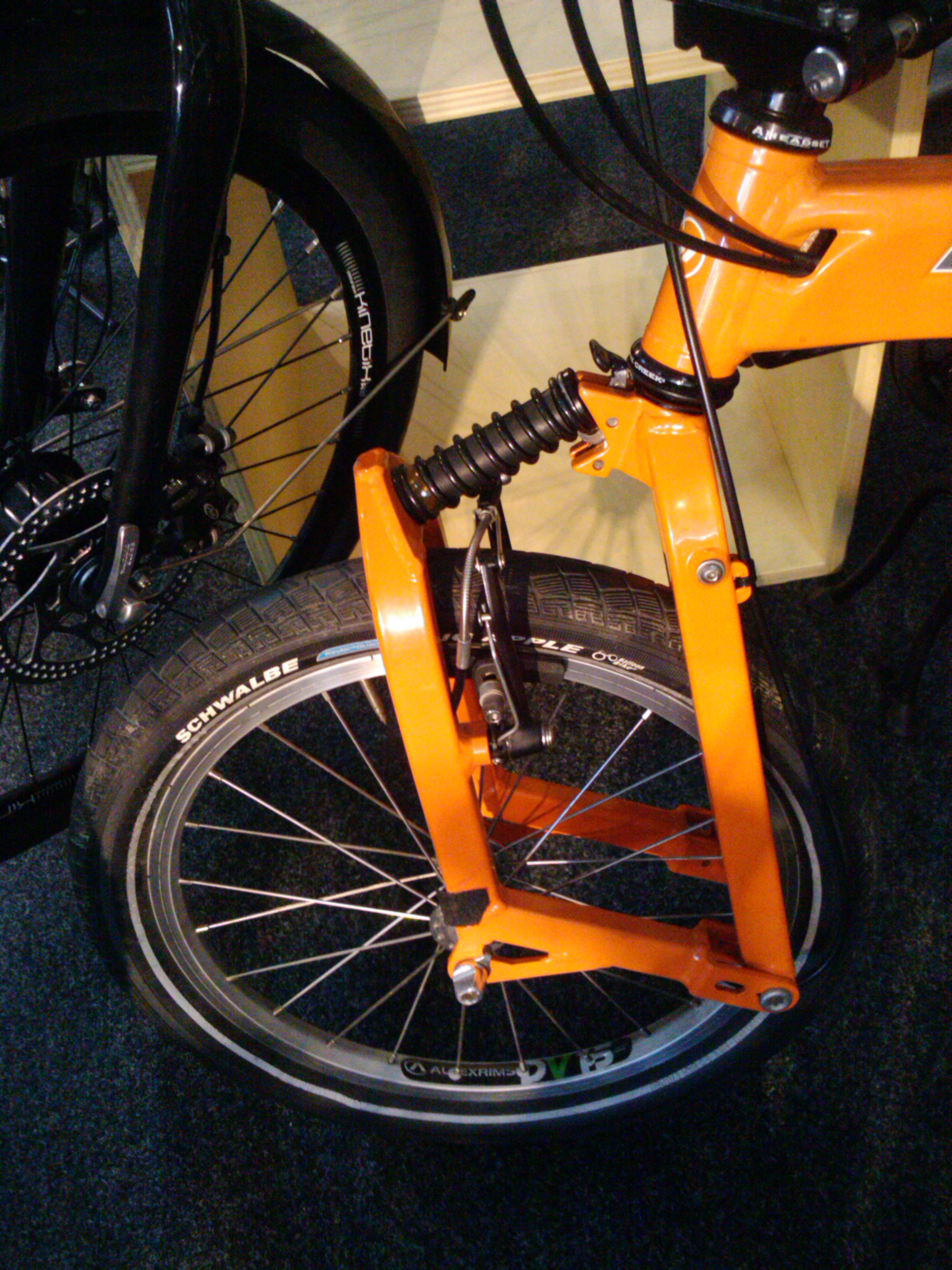
Leading link suspension fork on a Birdy folding bike

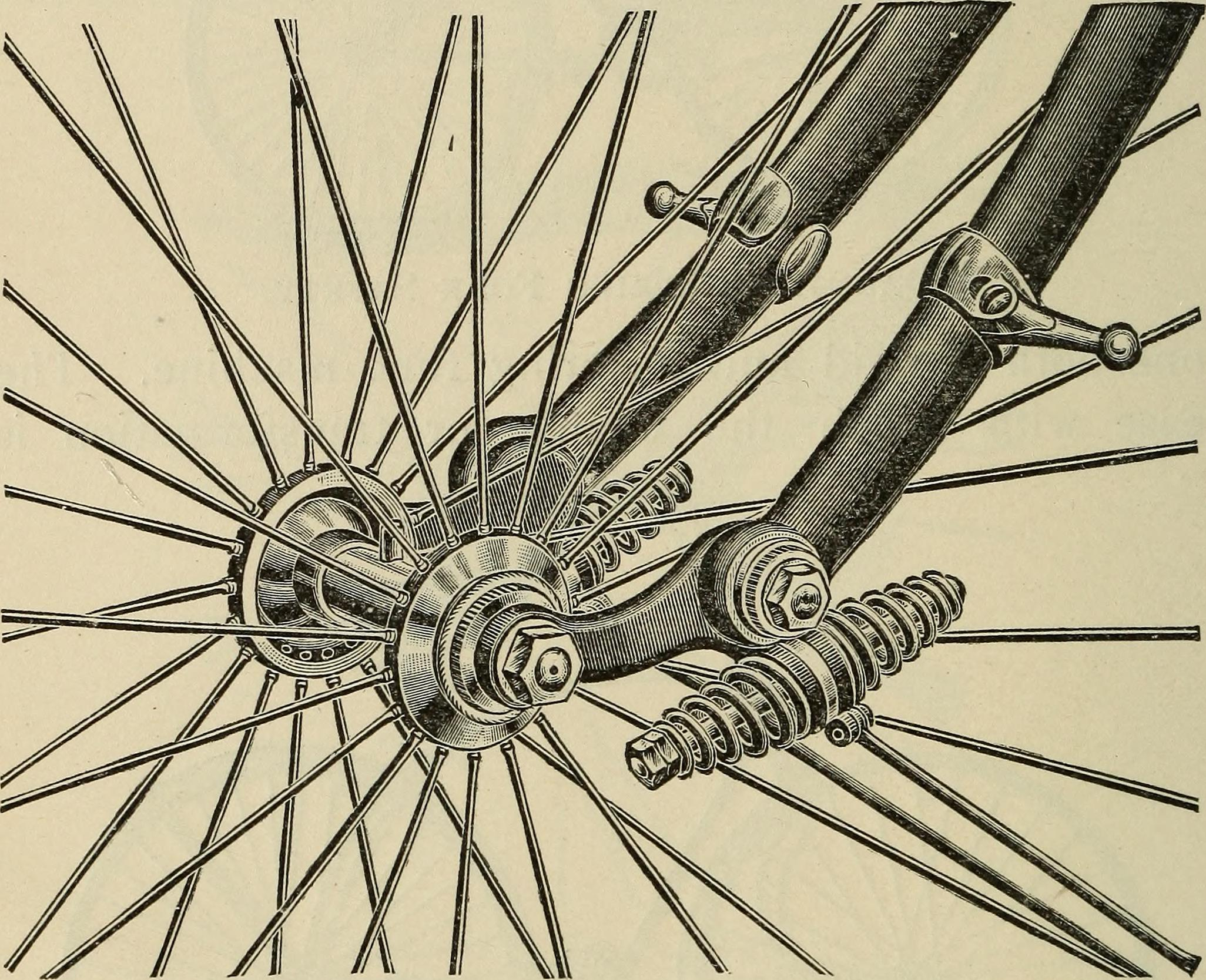
fork with screws and springs detail from a safety bicycle

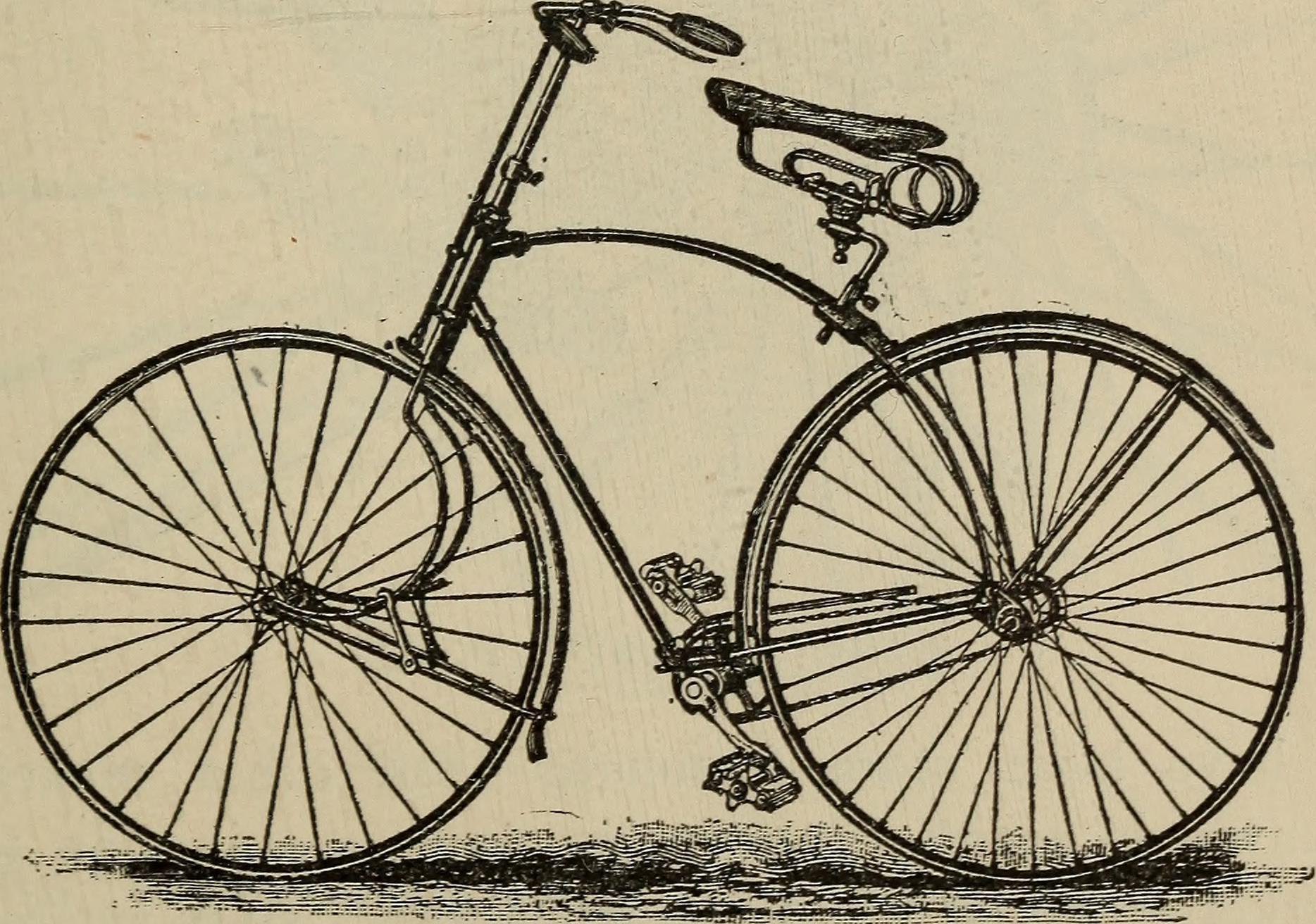
Safety bicycle with a spring fork

== Rear suspension ==
Bicycles with rear suspension typically also have front suspension. Recumbent bicycles with suspension are an exception and often employ rear-only suspension.

Mountain bike suspension technology has made great advances since first appearing in the early 1990s. Early full suspension frames were heavy and tended to bounce up and down while a rider pedaled. This movement was called pedal bob, kickback, or monkey motion and took power out of a rider's pedal stroke — especially during climbs up steep hills. Input from hard braking efforts also negatively affected early full suspension designs. When a rider hit the brakes, these early suspensions compressed into their travel and lost some of their ability to absorb bumps. This happened in situations where the rear suspension was needed most. When braking efforts cause the suspension to compress it is referred to as brake squat, when braking causes the suspension to extend it is called brake jack.

Problems with pedal bob and brake jack began to be controlled in the early 1990s. One of the first successful full suspension bikes was designed by Mert Lawwill, a former motorcycle champion. His bike, the Gary Fisher RS-1, was released in 1992. Its rear suspension adapted the A-arm suspension design from sports car racing, and was the first four-bar linkage in mountain biking. This design reduced the twin problems of unwanted braking and pedaling input to the rear wheel, but the design wasn't flawless. Problems remained with suspension action under acceleration, and the RS-1 couldn't use traditional cantilever brakes since the rear axle, and thus rim, moved in relation to the chainstays and seatstays. A lightweight, powerful disc brake wasn't developed until the mid-1990s, and the disc brake used on the RS-1 was its downfall.

Horst Leitner began working on the problem of chain torque and its effect on suspension in the mid-1970s with motorcycles. In 1985 Leitner built a prototype mountain bike incorporating what became known later as the "Horst link". The Horst link is a type of four-bar suspension. Leitner formed a mountain bike and research company, AMP Research, that began building full-suspension mountain bikes. In 1990, AMP introduced the Horst link as a feature of a "fully independent linkage" rear suspension for mountain bikes. The AMP B-3 and B-4 XC full-suspension bikes featured optional disc brakes and Horst link rear suspension very similar to the Macpherson strut. Note that the sliding piston in the shock absorber represents the fourth "bar" in this case. A later model, the B-5, was equipped with a revolutionary four-bar front suspension fork, as well as the Horst link in the rear. It featured up to 125 mm (5 inches) of travel on a bicycle weighing around 10.5 kg (23 pounds). For 10 years AMP Research manufactured their full-suspension bikes in small quantities in Laguna Beach, California, including the manufacture of their own hubs, rear shocks, front suspension forks and cable-actuated-hydraulic disc brakes which they pioneered.

=== Soft tail ===
A soft tail (also softail) relies on the flexing of the chainstays of a regular diamond frame to create suspension travel, sometimes incorporating a specific flexing member within the chainstays. A shock absorber (or elastomer) is placed in line with the seat stays to allow the chainstays to move up and down, and for shock absorption. As the suspension moves through its travel the seat stay and shock absorber move out of alignment. This misalignment creates a mechanical lever for suspension forces, causing torque on the joint between chain- and seatstays. This is an inherent structural disadvantage of the soft tail design and severely limits the amount of travel possible, typically around 1 to 2 inches. Soft tails have few moving parts and few pivot points making them simple and requiring little maintenance. Some notable examples include the KHS Team Softail, Trek STP and the Moots YBB. Some bikes (such as the Cannondale Scalpel, Yeti ASR Carbon and older Yeti bikes) use a four-bar suspension design where one of the pivots is replaced by a flexing link.

=== Unified rear triangle ===
The unified rear triangle or "URT" for short, keeps the bottom bracket and rear axle directly connected at all times. Suspension action is provided between the rear triangle, which unites rear axle and bottom bracket, and the front triangle, which unites seat and front axle. This design uses only one pivot, which keeps the number of moving parts down. The fixed length between bottom bracket and rear axle gives the URT the advantage of zero chain growth and consistent front derailleur shifting. Additionally the bike is easily modified into a single-speed. However, as the URT's suspension moves, the distance between seat and pedals changes, detracting from pedaling efficiency. Furthermore, when the rider shifts any weight from the seat to the pedals, he or she is shifting weight from the sprung part of the bike to the unsprung parts. As such, part of the rider's weight is no longer suspended by the suspension system. Since pedaling itself is a shift of this weight, the design is very prone to suspension bob.

Notable examples of bikes with this type of suspension include the Ibis Szazbo, Klein Mantra, Schwinn S-10, and Trek Y.

=== Single pivot ===
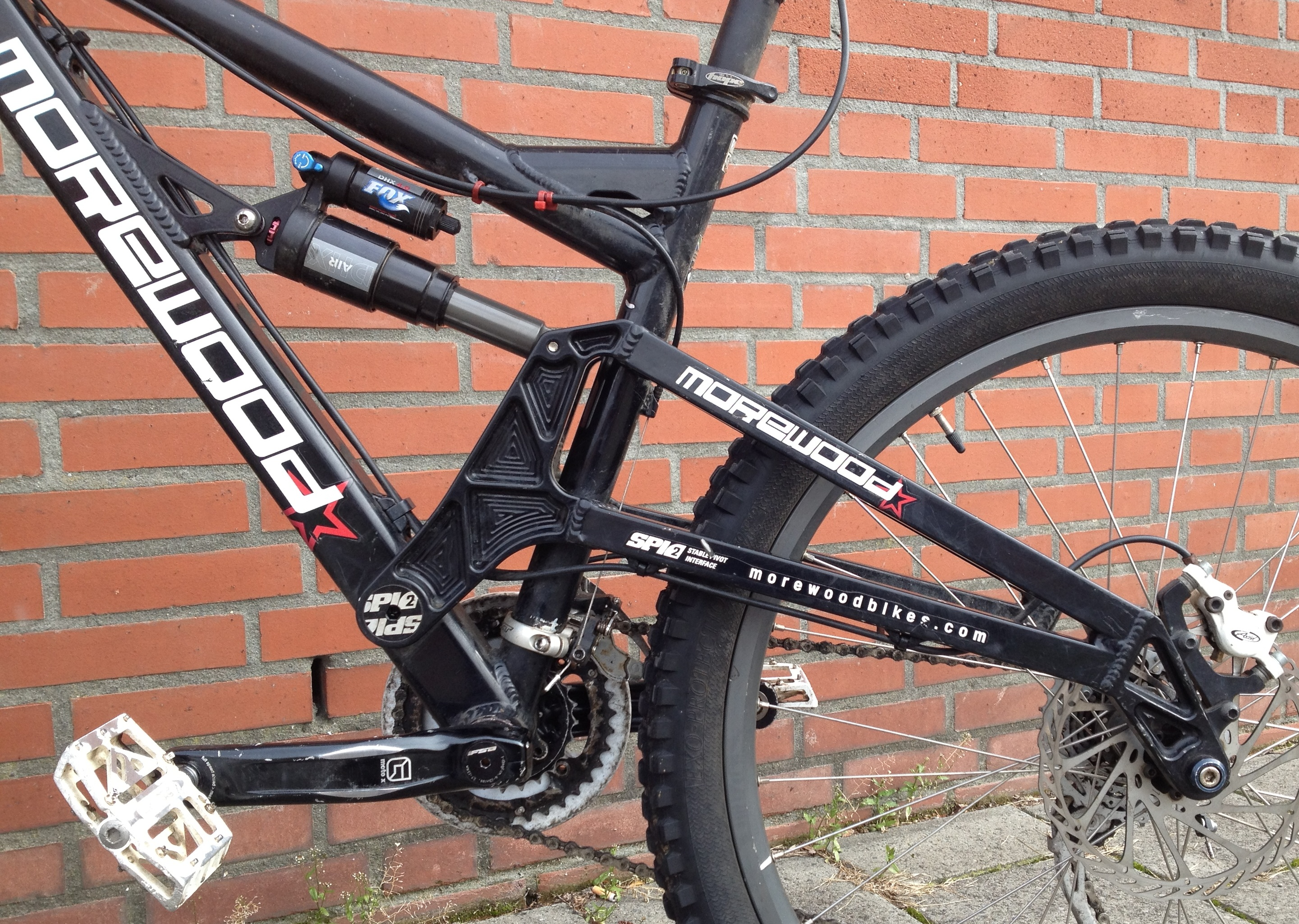
Single pivot suspension with 160 mm travel on a 2008 Morewood Mbuzi

A single pivot suspension is one in which there is only one pivot point connecting the rear wheel to the main frame of the bike. There may or not be other pivots on the bike, but fulfilling the aforementioned condition makes it a single pivot suspension. A bike might have a four bar suspension and still be single pivot. A bike might have different linkages connecting the rear triangle to the shock and still be a single pivot. Such linkages allow the progressivity of the suspension to be optimized. Single pivot bikes in which the shock is directly connected to the rear triangle, while taking advantage of the simplicity of the design, create a regressive suspension rate, which depending on the type of riding and the force of the impacts, may not be optimal. An advantage of a classic single pivot bike in comparison with a four-bar single or multiple pivot design is the rigidity that it's possible to attain with a single structure that's connecting the rear wheel to the frame. Some designs try to combine this advantage with a more progressive suspension rate by using the aforementioned extra linkages between the rear triangle and the shock.

Another challenge of single pivot bikes is the “brake jack”, or the influence of braking on the behaviour of the rear suspension. A four bar design allows this problem to be tackled by connecting the rear brake to the seatstays. For other designs, a floating brake mount has been used on some downhill oriented bikes, by means of a pole that connects the rear brake mount to the frame, as a sort of four-bar system for the brake alone. This type of system has mostly gone out of use due to the extra weight it brings, as brake jack is not considered as an especially significant problem.

==== Linkage driven single pivot ====
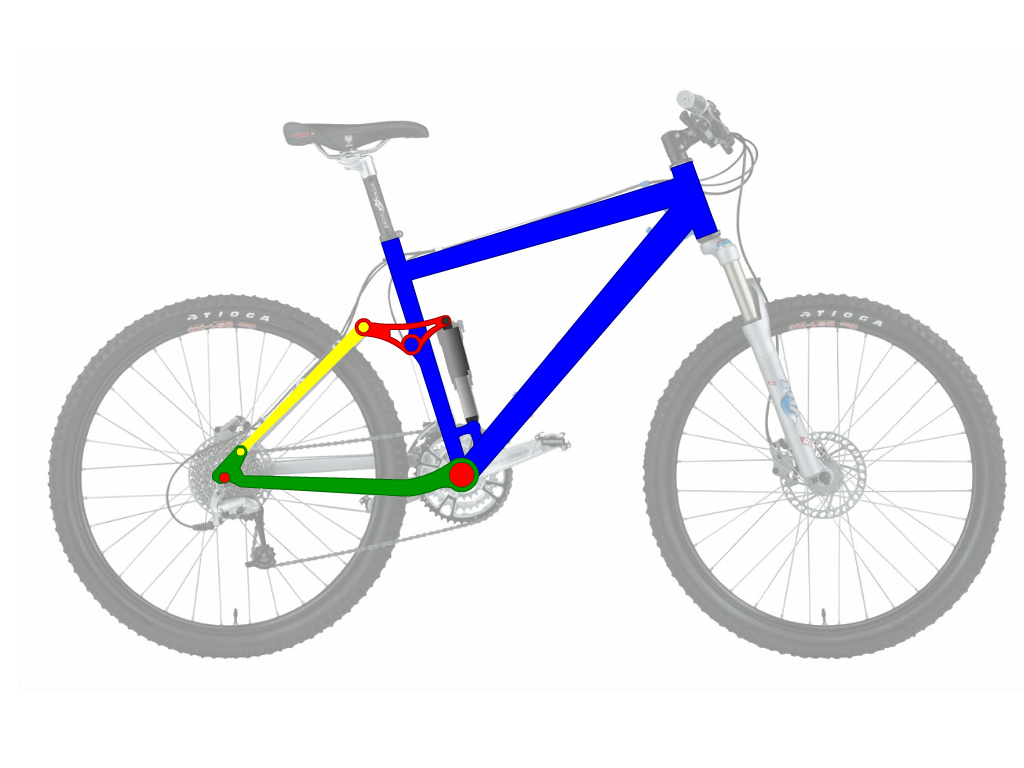
Linkage driven single pivot rear suspension

There are two types of linkage driven single pivots, those in which the extra linkages that connect the main swingarm to the shock play a structural role in the rigidity of the rear section, which are the four bar single pivot designs, and those in which this rigidity is assured by the swingarm alone. In this case the linkages are used to optimize the suspension rate. They may in some cases be designed to add extra rigidity but their role in this regard is not as crucial as in a four bar design.

Notable manufacturers well known for their long-time use of this suspension design include KHS, Kona, Jamis, Diamondback Bicycles and older Trek Fuels.

==== Pivot height ====
With single pivot designs, it's easy to know how pedaling will influence the rear suspension by looking at the pivot location, and how it stands in relation to the chain line. The chain line corresponds to the part of the chain that is in tension. Its location depends on the size of the chainring that is being used, and on what gear is selected on the cassette. If the pivot is on this line or its continuation, the force that is being actuated on the chain has no influence on the suspension. If the pivot is above this line, pedaling will create anti-squat, which will stiffen and rise the suspension (by what degree depends obviously on the vertical distance between the pivot and the chain line). If the pivot is below this line, the pedaling force will cause the suspension to squat. This is a non-desirable trait, however a squatting design has the advantage of lessening pedal kickback. So in all suspension bikes, there is always a compromise between pedaling efficiency and pedal kickback. Heavier riders will suffer less from pedal kickback, so for them a suspension with more anti-squat won't be as compromised as it might be for lighter riders.

=== Split pivot ===
The split pivot design is a special case of linkage-driven single pivot in which one of the four-bar's pivot points coincides with the rear axle. This allows for the disc brake caliper to be mounted on the floating linkage (also called coupler) instead of on the swingarm. As a result of this the braking torque now interacts with the suspension via the floating linkage. The linkages can be designed such that this has a positive effect on suspension performance under braking, typically reducing brake jack. Furthermore, the relative rotation between brake disc and brake caliper as the suspension goes through its travel is different from that in single pivot designs. The four linkages in a split pivot design influence how braking torque is transmitted, how the brake caliper moves in relation to the disc and influence the leverage ratio between wheel travel and shock travel. Since these influences may have a different optimum linkage design, the bike's design has to strike a balance. Dave Weagle designed a split pivot which he named "Split Pivot". Trek Bicycle Corporation also released a version of the split pivot design called "Active Braking Pivot" (ABP) in early 2007. Cycles Devinci has released a licensed implementation of the "Split Pivot" design which Dave Weagle managed to patent.

=== Horst link ===
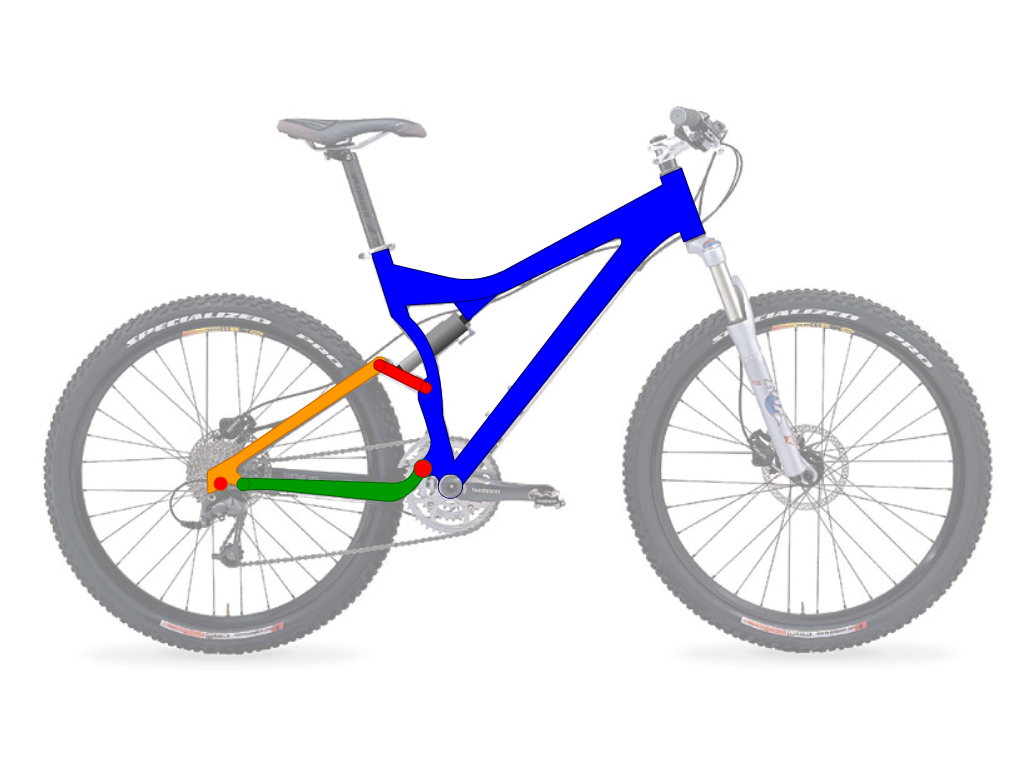
Four-bar rear suspension

"Horst Link" suspension is a type of four-bar linkage suspension. It is characterized by having both connecting links pivot on the seat tube, with the lower pivot located above the center of the bottom bracket, and the rear axle being located higher than the pivot connecting floating link and lower connecting link.

Specialized has bought several of Leitner's patents which they use for their "FSR Suspension". Several manufacturer had licensed the design from Specialized. Some European manufacturers, such as Cube and Scott, do use the same suspension design, but couldn't import it to the United States until 2013 due to patent protection. Norco also licensed the design from Specialized but further optimized the FSR system, calling their own system Advanced Ride Technology (ART).

=== Short link four-bar ===
Although not necessarily sharing any general suspension characteristics, these designs all share a certain structural benefit. Because the connecting links are so short, the floating link comes in the form of a rigid rear triangle big enough to encompass the rear wheel. This allows the rear triangle on both sides of the wheel to be rigidly connected together as one piece, before attaching to the connecting links of the four-bar. This significantly increases lateral and torsional stiffness of the rear, often a weakness of four-bar designs, and reduces the load on the pivots, connecting links and joint between rear axle and frame.

==== Virtual Pivot Point ====
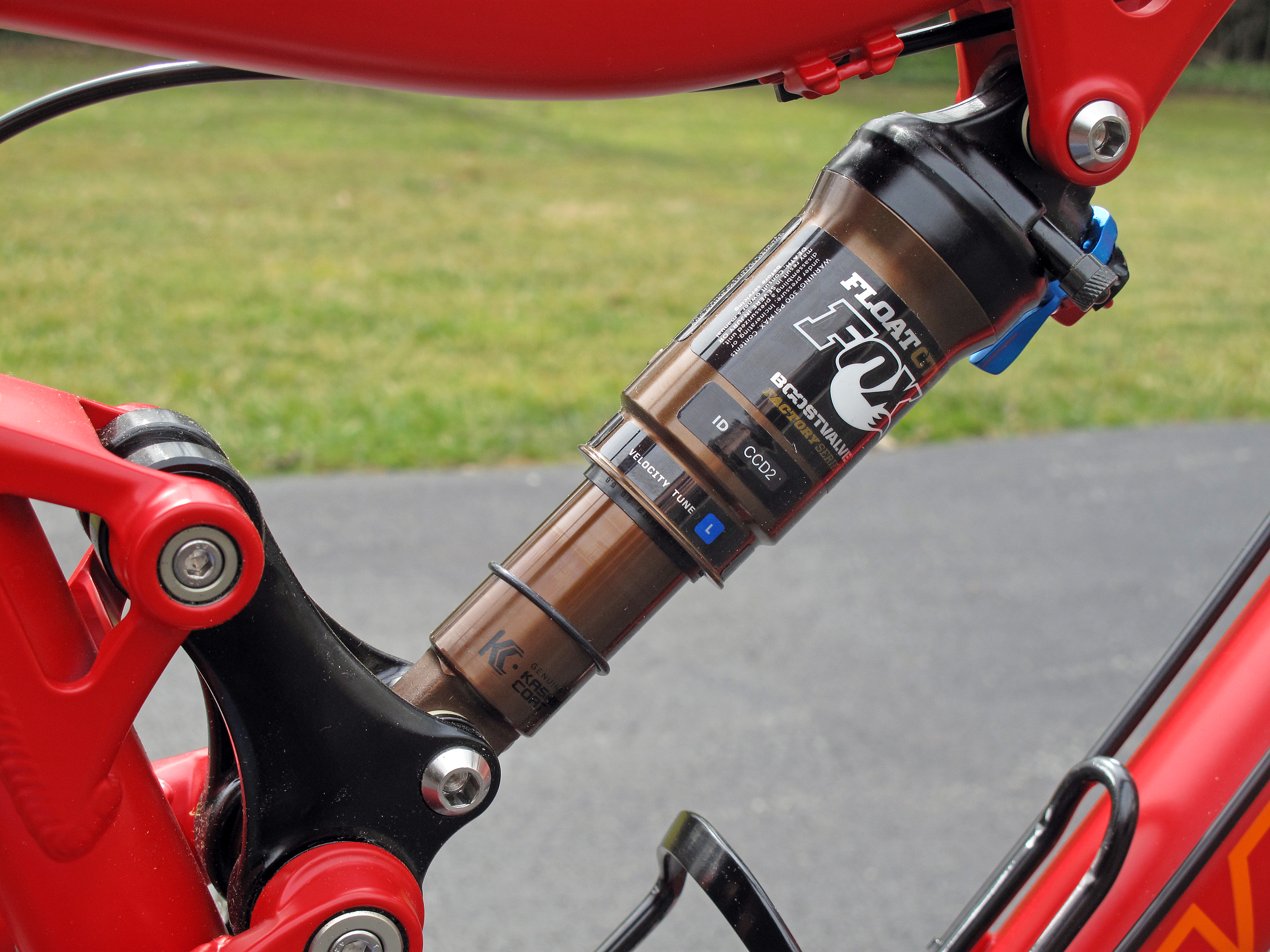
VPP suspension on a 2013 Santa Cruz Tallboy

The "Virtual Pivot Point" or VPP, is the name given to a four-bar linkage suspension with relatively short links connecting the rear triangle to the frame. It is characterized by having a chainstay lengthening effect and an S-shaped axle path. Some variations may have the links rotate in opposite direction as the suspension moves. The instant centre of rotation, as found in all linkage systems, is also called virtual pivot point. The "Virtual Pivot Point" suspension was developed by Jamie Calon and James Klassen for Outland Bikes in the nineties and the associated patents are now owned by Santa Cruz Bicycles.

==== Living Link ====
A newer suspension design from Spot Bikes couples a "Living Link" with a conventional VPP or twin link rear suspension system. This design replaces the bottom pivot link with a carbon fiber leaf spring, connecting the front triangle with the rear triangle of the bike. It may seem less durable, but their carbon fiber technology is amongst the best and because it is such a short link, it can endure large forces. This suspension design helps improve pedaling efficiency and rides over bumps like no other, according to forums on PinkBike.

==== DW-link ====
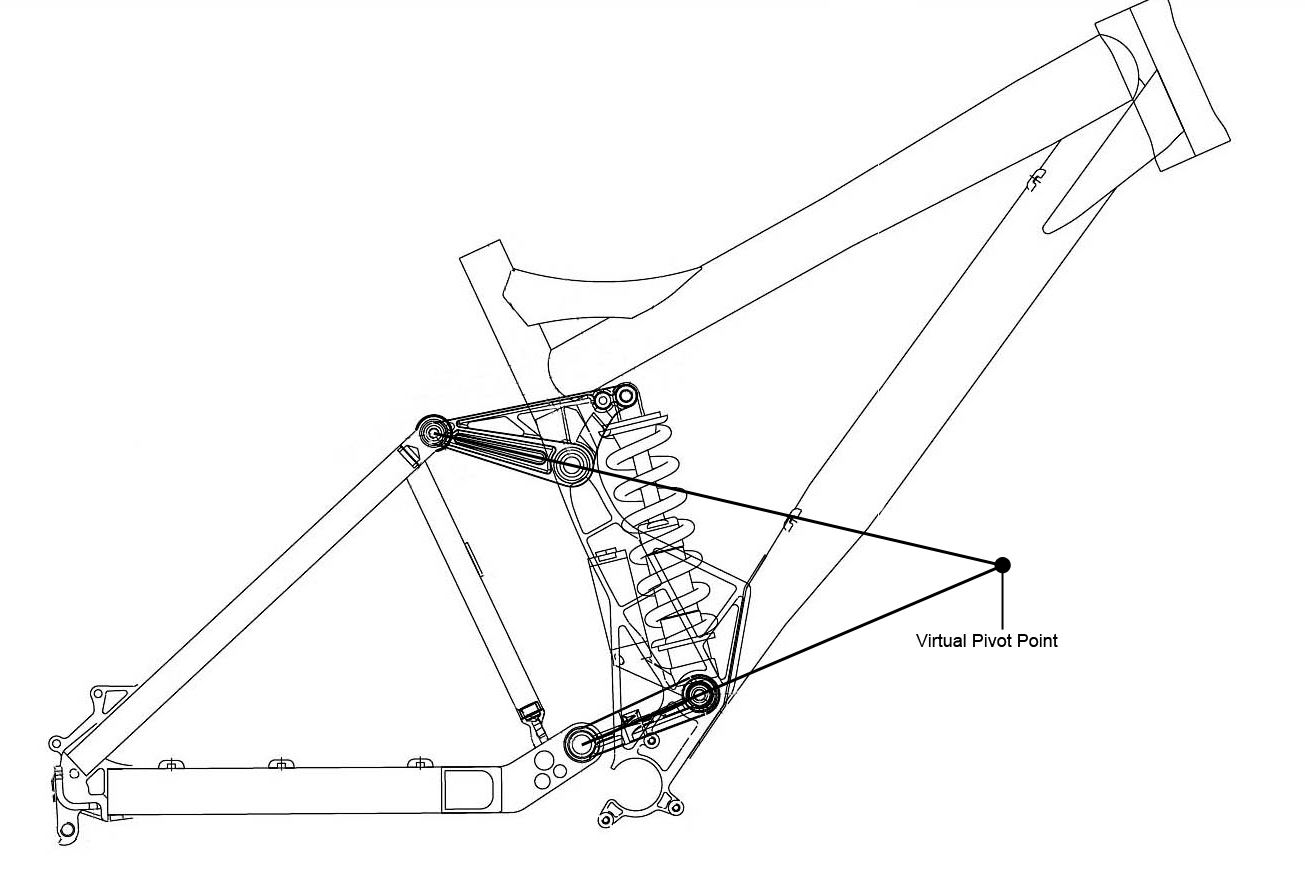
Diagram of the DW-link suspension, as implemented on an Iron Horse Sunday, showing the location of the instant center at top-out

Dave Weagle's "DW-link" is another four-bar suspension system with two relatively short links, which typically co-rotate. It is characterized by an anti-squat response that varies with suspension travel and is designed to reduce loss of energy resulting from squat during pedaling. It typically has higher anti-squat at the beginning of suspension travel, and less thereafter. The DW-link was originally used by Iron Horse Bicycle Company. The company filed for bankruptcy in early 2009 and was acquired by Dorel Industries in July 2009. The DW-link is now licensed to Ibis, Independent Fabrication, Turner Suspension Bicycles, and Pivot Cycles.

==== Giant Maestro ====
Another variation using short, co-rotating, links is employed by Giant Bicycles called "Maestro". Dave Weagle sued Giant for patent infringement after Giant consulted with Dave Weagle of DW Link. In 2014 the lawsuit was dropped after a lengthy and costly battle.

==== Switch link ====
Yet another variation of short link design is the "Switch link", found on some Yeti bikes like the SB-66 designed by Dave Earle. In the original form, the rear triangle is connected to the frame using an eccentric lower pivot, effectively creating a very short lower link whose length is that from the centre of the eccentric to the attached pivot. The lower link would initially rotate upwards and backwards slightly. The links counter-rotated such that the top link would rotate forwards and upwards initially. As the top link rotated further it would move downwards reversing or "Switching" the lower link's direction downwards and forwards. In the more recent form, the lower link has been replaced with a linear bearing based on shock technology from Fox Racing Shox. This linear bearing simply moves up initially and then down towards the end of the suspension travel.

==== Trek Full Floater ====
Trek bicycles' "Full Floater" is a system where the rear shock is only attached to the rear triangle. The chainstays pivot on the seat-tube, and then extend into the front triangle, and the lower shock bushing attaches to the chainstays. The seatstays are attached to an "Evo" link, which then attaches to the shock top bushings. This system enables finer tuning of suspension kinematics, as the shock angle relative to the linkages during the travel changes in a more linear fashion. Trek also combines "Full Floater" with its "ABP" rear axle, where the rear suspension pivot is the rear axle, which reduces pedal feedback and prevents the braking forces on the wheel from altering the suspension movement. It also provides better traction and control through braking over rough terrain. From 2019 on Trek stopped using the full floater design, and instead uses a fixed lower shock mount attached to the frame.

=== Equilink ===
The "Equilink" suspension system was developed by Felt Bicycles for their full suspension line. The system employs a "Stephenson-style" six-bar linkage suspension system. Equilink gets its name from the dog bone shaped bar that ties the upper and lower links together. Early models included a pivot between chain- and seatstay whereas in later, carbon fiber, models the chain- and seatstays are one piece, creating pivoting action by flexing. Felt contends that the system holds its pedaling efficiency in any gear combination.

== Floating drivetrain ==
Bikes with a 'floating drivetrain' or 'floating bottom bracket' can use any type of suspension system to suspend the rear wheel from the frame, but use linkages to connect the crank assembly to the frame and rear suspension. Since the linkages are connected to the rear suspension, suspension movement causes the crank assembly to move as well. The floating drivetrain is often employed to compensate for the disadvantages of a particular rear suspension system so the design can make better use of its advantages.

=== Independent Drivetrain ===
The "Independent Drivetrain" (or "IDrive") is a four-bar suspension system for bicycle crank assemblies, the rear wheel itself is suspended as single pivot suspension. It was developed by mountain bike suspension designer Jim Busby Jr. and was a direct result of the limitations encountered with the GT LTS (GT Bicycles' "Links Tuned Suspension") four-bar linkage design used by GT Bicycles from 1993 to 1998. The IDrive attempts to maximize the efficiency of the transmission of energy from the rider to the rear wheel. The bottom bracket is placed eccentric in a bearing within the swingarm, the distance between the center of the bearing and the bottom bracket effectively creating a very short link, and the swingarm itself creating another. A link between bearing shell and frame then completes the four-bar linkage with the bottom bracket on the floating link and the linkage as a whole actuated by movement of the swingarm.

=== Monolink ===
The "Monolink" made by Maverick Bikes and designed by RockShox founder Paul Turner, is a variant of the Independent Drivetrain suspension, and is a variation of the MacPherson strut. It uses three pivot points and the sliding action of the shock to provide the fourth degree of freedom. This design places the bottom bracket on the link (the Monolink) connecting the frame and rear triangle. Any load on the cranks is partly unsprung since it is also a load on one of the suspension's parts itself, and actively works against the suspension. However, because of this there is less bob during out-of-the-saddle sprints. Once again it is an attempt at maximizing drivetrain efficiency, compromising other areas. Notable bikes using this design are the Maverick ML7, Durance, ML8 and the Klein Palomino.

=== Pendbox ===
The "Pendbox" is found on several of Lapierre's linkage driven single pivot bikes in which the crank assembly is hung from the frame using a 'mini-swingarm'; the Pendbox. A link connects the swingarm and Pendbox such that they form a four-bar linkage.

== Seatpost suspension ==
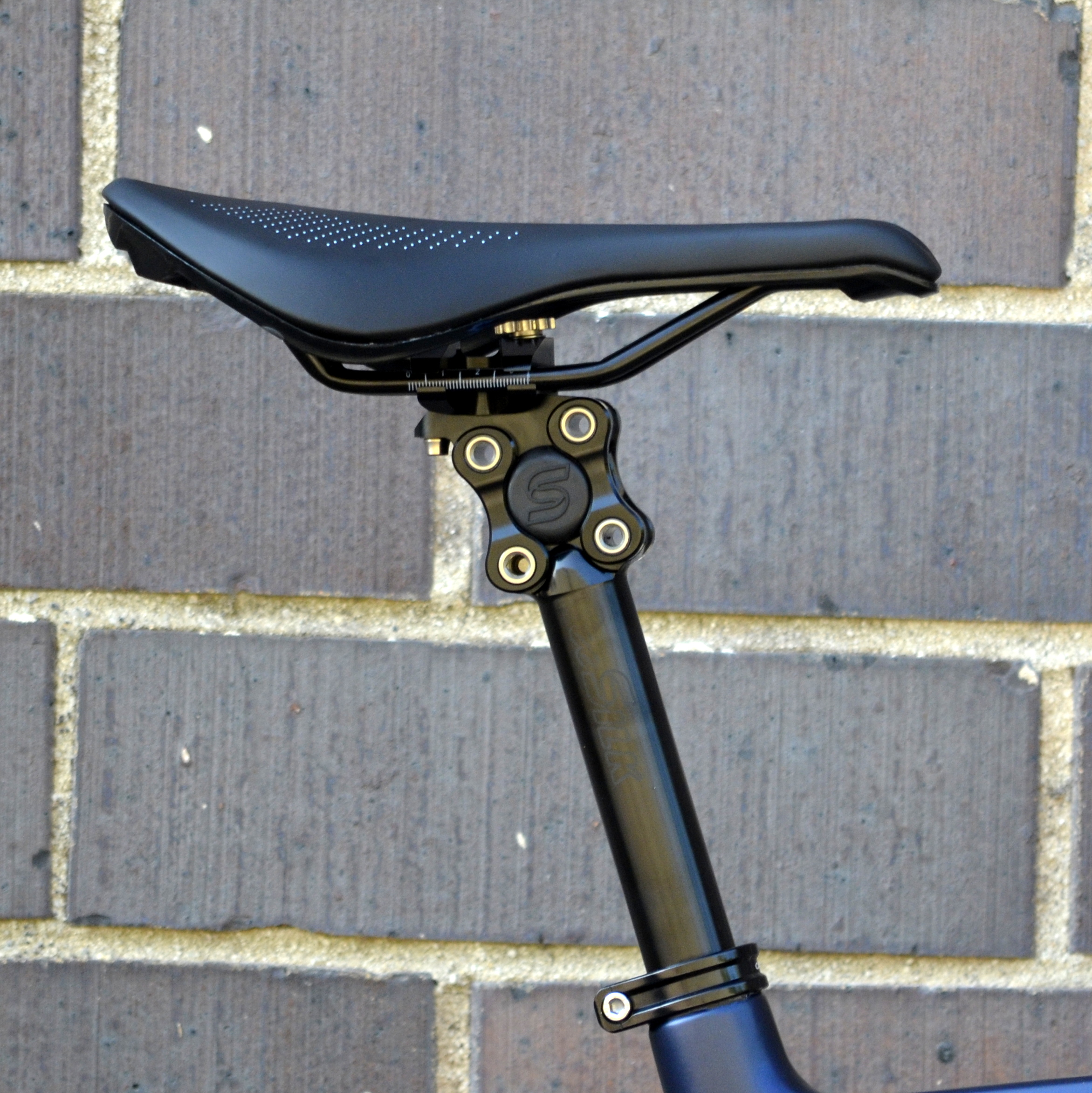
Parallelogram type suspension seatpost.

Suspension may be implemented at the saddle either using a suspension saddle, suspension rails or a suspension seatpost. There are many different kinds of suspension seatposts, not to be confused with dropper seatposts, operating on a variety of different mechanisms. Different designs of suspension cause the seat to move in different paths during the compression.

The most basic suspension seat post, a piston style, like the one pictured on the side, uses a sliding post with spring pressure that is often changeable by adjusting a threaded insert in the bottom of the post to adjust the preload on the spring. All piston style seatposts move in a down and forward motion at the slope the seat tube. Because of the need for these parts to slide up and down, all piston style suspension seatposts suffer from at least a slight rotation around the axis of the post resulting in a seat that can wiggle side to side slightly. Piston style seatposts with springs that are not preloaded or other designs with poor tolerances can also have slight up and down wiggle in the seat in the axis of the post. A seat that is not held in place properly can be dangerous if not at least uncomfortable and annoying. Newer and better designs of the piston style seat post have minimized all forms of wiggle and seatposts with actual adjustable pistons built into the post are even available.

Parallelogram suspension seat posts use dual linked bars that connect the saddle clamp to the post, and all operate in an arcing motion although some arc backwards and others arc forwards. Differences between the arc directions create posts that are designed for different things, a rear arc would be better for small wheels, moving fast or going uphill while a forward direction would be best with larger wheels on a downhill or at slower speeds. Some seat posts are designed with uneven links creating what is not actually a parallelogram so that the arch approximates a straight line when compressed. Various different designs are implemented to tension the seat post, some use elastomers and others use pistons. The size, shape and position of these elastomers and pistons vary by brand and model as well. Some of the elastomers are adjustable by stacking different combinations of elastomer rings to create a specific profile and ramping up of the suspension. Others have adjustable air pressure or ways to change the profile of the compression.

Rail suspension is a V-shaped loop of seat rail with an extra saddle clamp on the top. The suspension rails are connected to the saddle clamp on the seat post and the extra saddle clamp on the rails is connected to the seat raising the seat up an extra 1.5-3 inches taller. The stiffness of the suspension rails are set by placement of the clamps to the fold in the rails. the motion of the suspension is down and back in an arc with the radius and distance determined by how stiff it is.

The effectiveness of saddle, rail, or seatpost suspension depends on the rider placing their weight on the saddle. For this reason, this style of suspension is most popular on more upright styles of bicycle, where the rider spends the majority of time seated. They are especially good for bikes with no other form of suspension such as hybrid bikes, cruisers, road or cyclocross bikes however they can still help on hardtail mountain bikes if used for riding rough or bumpy areas where the suspension in the fork does not create adequate comfort.

== Suspension hub ==
Suspension may be provided in the hub of a bicycle wheel. One manufacturer offers 12 mm to 24 mm of travel.

In mountain biking the term 'suspension hub' was used in the 90s to describe hubs with oversized axle ends and a thicker axles than were customary at the time. These hubs were designed to stiffen up suspension forks, which were still somewhat of a novelty, by rigidly holding the fork legs in position relative to each other once the wheel was fitted, improving steering response in the fork. This term is no longer used as this function is no longer an exceptional requirement for mountain bike front hubs, so all current mountain bike hubs are suspension hubs.

== Terminology ==
Several terms are commonly used to describe different aspects of a bicycle suspension.

=== Travel ===
Travel refers to how much movement a suspension mechanism allows. It usually measures how much the wheel axle moves.

=== Preload ===
Preload refers to the force applied to spring component before external loads, such as rider weight, are applied. More preload makes the suspension sag less and less preload makes the suspension sag more. Adjusting preload affects the ride height of the suspension.

=== Rebound ===
Rebound refers to the rate at which the suspension component returns to its original configuration after absorbing a shock. The term also generally refers to rebound damping or rebound damping adjustments on shocks, which vary the rebound speed. More rebound damping will cause the shock to return at a slower rate.

=== Sag ===
Sag refers to how much a suspension moves under just the static load of the rider. Sag is often used as one parameter when tuning a suspension for a rider. Spring preload is adjusted until the desired amount of sag is measured.

=== Lockout ===
Lockout refers to a mechanism to disable a suspension mechanism to render it substantially rigid. This may be desirable during climbing or sprinting to prevent the suspension from absorbing power applied by the rider. Some lockout mechanisms also feature a "blow off" system that deactivates the lockout when an appropriate force is applied to help prevent damage to the shock and rider injury under high unexpected loads.

=== Bob and squat ===
Bob and squat refer to how a suspension, usually rear, responds to rider pedalling. Squat usually refers to how the rear end sinks under acceleration, and bob refers to repeated squat and rebound with each pedal stroke. Both are undesirable characteristics as they rob power from pedalling. Many suspension systems incorporate anti-bob, anti-squat, or "platform" damping to help eliminate bob.

=== Pedal feedback ===
Pedal feedback describes torque applied to the crankset by the chain caused by motion of the rear axle relative to the bottom bracket. Pedal feedback is caused by an increase in the distance between the chainring and rear cog, and it can be felt as a torque on the crankset opposite to forward pedaling.

=== Compression damping ===
Compression damping refers to systems that slow the rate of compression in a front fork shock or rear shock. Compression damping is usually accomplished by forcing a hydraulic fluid (such as oil) through a valve when the shock becomes loaded. The amount of damping is determined by the resistance through the valve, a higher amount of damping resulting from greater resistance in the valve. Many shocks have compression damping adjustments which vary the resistance in the valve. Often, lockouts function by allowing no or very little compression.

=== Unsprung mass ===
Unsprung mass is the mass of the portions of bicycles that is not supported by the suspension systems. At one extreme are road bicycles with no suspension in the frames, very little in the tires, and none in the saddles. By raising themselves off their saddles, riders may provide suspension with their knees, making their mass be sprung mass, but all of the mass of the bicycles remains unsprung mass. At the other extreme are full suspension mountain bikes. With front and rear suspensions the only parts unsuspended are the wheels and small parts of the front forks and rear chain-stays. Even then, as mountain bikes have large low-pressure tires which allow much more travel than small high-pressure road tires, the wheels are sprung to some extent as well.

In general, bikes are so light compared to their riders that travel is a much bigger motivator than unsprung mass in determining where to put the suspension and how much to use. The exception to this is that on recumbent and tandem bicycles where the riders are either unable to lift themselves out of their seat or unable to see in advance when that will be needed, the riders' mass can no longer be expected to be supported by their knees over road irregularities. These bicycles generally have some sort of suspension system to reduce unsprung mass.

== Mountain bikes ==
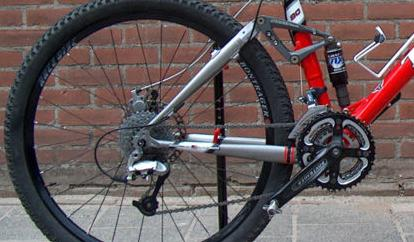
Rear suspension of a Trek Fuel 90, a low single pivot with rocker linkage design.

Many mountain bikes have a full suspension design. In the past, mountain bikes had a rigid frame and a rigid fork. In the early 1990s, mountain bikes started to have front suspension forks. This made riding on rough terrain easier on a rider's arms. The first suspension forks had about 1 1/2 to 2 inches (38 to 50 mm) of suspension travel. Soon after, some frame designers came out with a full suspension frame which gave riders a smoother ride throughout the ride.

Newer suspension frame and fork designs have reduced weight, increased amount of suspension travel, and improved feel. Many lock out the rear suspension while the rider is pedaling hard or climbing, in order to improve pedaling efficiency. Most suspension frames and forks have about 4-6 inches (100–150 mm) of suspension travel. More aggressive suspension frames and forks made for downhill racing and freeriding have as much as 8 or 9 inches (200 or 230 mm) of suspension travel.

Many riders still prefer to ride a hardtail frame, and almost all mountain bicycle riders use a suspension fork. Notable suspension fork manufacturers include Manitou, Öhlins, Marzocchi, Fox Racing Shox, RockShox, and (to a lesser extent) X-Fusion, RST, Suntour and Magura. Some bicycle manufacturers (notably Cannondale and Specialized) also make their own suspension systems.

== Road bikes ==
Although much less common, some road bicycles do incorporate suspensions, particularly the Soft Tail variety mentioned above. One example is Trek Bicycle Corporation's s.p.a (Suspension Performance Advantage) rear suspension, offered on some of their Pilot models, but the system was removed for the 2008 model year. Virtually all bicycles produced by Alex Moulton bicycles also have very effective full suspension, due to the low unsuspended mass of the small wheels and high pressure tires, a characteristic of the unconventional design of these bicycles. A recent design is the cantilevered 'swing shock' on some modern hybrid bikes.

== Recumbent bikes ==
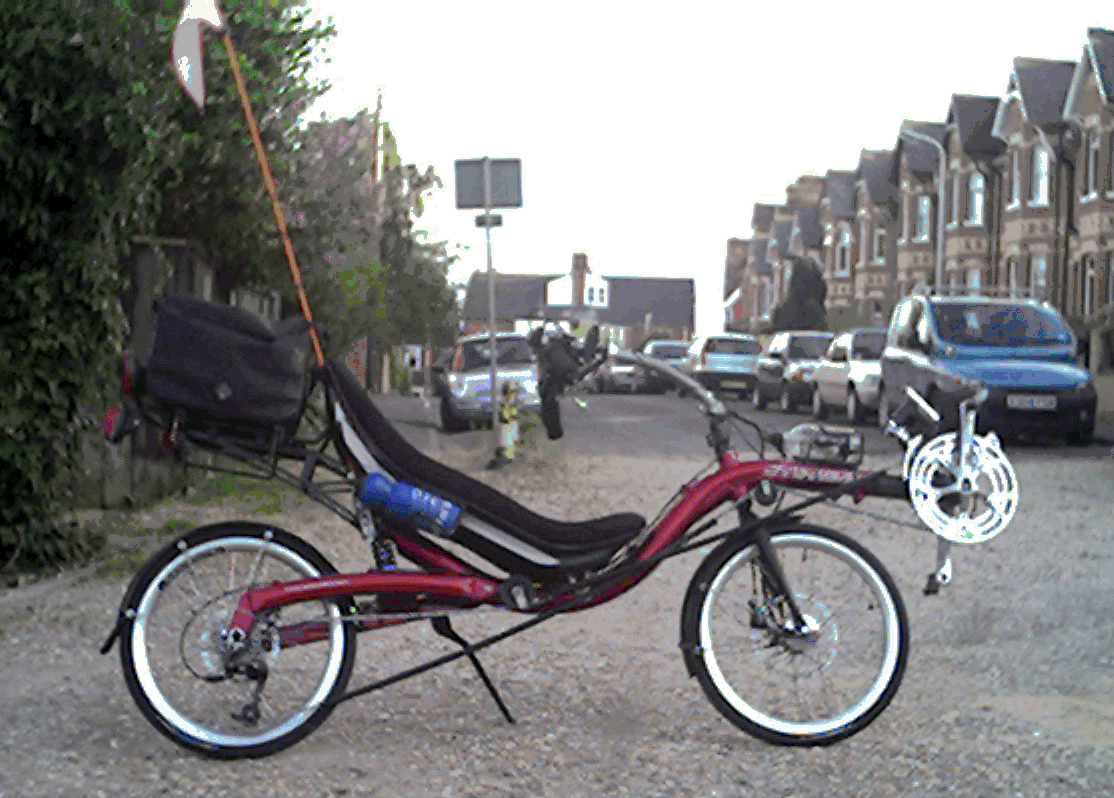
The Optima Stinger recumbent with rear suspension

Many recumbent bicycles have at least a rear suspension because the rider is usually unable to lift themselves off the seat while riding. Single pivot is usually adequate when the pedaling thrust is horizontal - that is, forwards rather than downwards. This is usually the case provided the bottom bracket is higher than the seat's base height. Where the bottom bracket is significantly lower than the seat base, there may still be some pedaling-induced bounce.

Short-wheelbase recumbents benefit from front suspension more than long wheelbase recumbents because the front wheel (often small diameter which further magnifies the need for suspension) is taking a much larger portion of the loads than in a long wheelbase recumbent.

== Softride and Zipp ==
The Softride Suspension System was launched at the Interbike 1989 bike show. The original SRS systems consisted of two foam filled fiberglass boxes bonded together with a viscoelastic layer. Originally intended for the use in mountain bikes, Softride produced its first full-fledged mountain bike, the PowerCurve, in 1991. During 1996 Softride released its first aluminum frame road bike, the Classic TT. The Softride Suspension System is used almost exclusively for triathlon racing. Softride ceased bicycle production in 2007 after the design was banned from UCI races.

A very closely related suspension design to the Softride is the Zipp 2001, a contemporary competing beam bicycle, where the suspension was in the hinge, rather than in flex of the beam itself.

== See also ==
- 27.5 Mountain bike
- 29er (bicycle)
- Bicycle
- Bicycle and motorcycle dynamics
- Bicycle fork
- Bicycle frame
- Cycling
- Downhill bike
- Downhill mountain biking
- Glossary of cycling
- Hybrid bicycle
- List of bicycle parts
- Motorcycle fork
- Mountain bike
- Mountain biking
- Outline of cycling
- Recumbent bicycle
- Road bicycle
- Shock absorber
- Suspension (motorcycle)
- Suspension (vehicle)
- Suspension (mechanics)
- Swingarm
- RockShox
- Fox Factory
- SunTour
