= DW-link =

Subset of the common four-bar system used widely in bicycle suspension

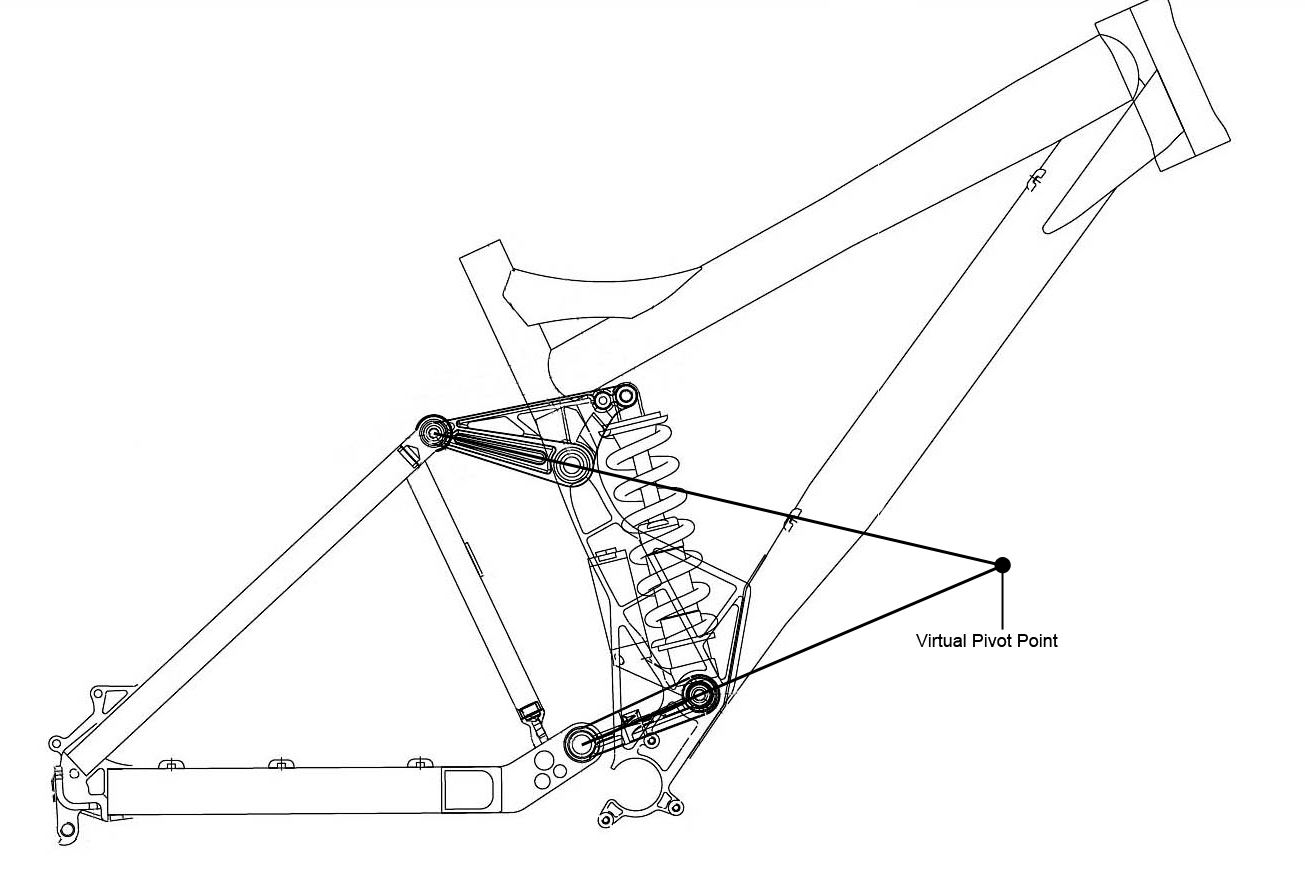
Diagram of the dw-link suspension, as implemented on an Iron Horse Sunday, showing the location of the virtual pivot point

The DW-link is a subset of the common four-bar system used widely in bicycle suspension. The four-bar system has been used on mountain bikes since the early days of suspension. Similar suspension systems to the DW-link have been used by Schwinn, Fisher and Karpiel. Currently a similar system is used by Giant and named "Maestro". DW-link gets its name from the designer and patent holder, mechanical engineer Dave Weagle. Currently the DW-link has been licensed to the following bicycle companies: PIVOT Cycles, Ibis, Independent Fabrication, Turner Suspension Bicycles, and Iron Horse Bicycles. The DW-link suspension design was used to win six Elite level UCI downhill World Championships from 2005 to 2007, the highest contested level of the sport. This winning streak made the dw-link the most successful linkage suspension platform in the history of the sport of downhill. Dave Weagle also developed the Split Pivot suspension and Delta System which are both used in cycling.

Weagle's design currently holds multiple patents, including US7128329, which is the world's first and remains to be the only published account on the method of mathematically and geometrically characterizing linkage chain/ belt-driven, and shaft-driven motorcycle and bicycle suspensions. US Patent 7128329 introduced several new concepts and measurements to the suspension world, specifically the concept of characterizing anti-squat as a curve or area when graphed as a function of anti-squat versus compressive travel. The portfolio also proposed the same basic measurement for braking squat versus compressive travel distance. These measurements are now accepted as "anti-squat curves" and "braking squat curves" by some professionals in the field of vehicle suspension dynamics.

== Development ==
Recreational mountain biker Dave Weagle used his background in four-wheeled vehicle suspension dynamics to investigate the linkage axle path of bicycle suspension systems. The analysis method that Weagle developed stands as the first published text on the analysis of linkage suspension systems for chain driven wheels. Weagle's research was directed towards what is known among mountain bikers as "suspension bob." Analysis revealed that the "bob" was a result of the combined effects of load transfer during acceleration and the unbalanced forces of the rider's legs moving up and down. It was realized that the use of anti-squat could counteract the load transfer and pedaling induced forces that produced "suspension bob" and limited traction.

== Overview ==
Bicycles have a short wheelbase relative to the height of their center of mass, when compared to other vehicles such as cars. Because bicycles are pedaled, their forward acceleration tends to be in surges while each pedal is under power. Because the driving force at the rear wheel is not aligned with the center of mass, the bicycle experiences a torque, according to Euler's second law. This torque is partially responsible for the compression of the rear suspension under power known as squat. Squat that occurs in time with pedaling is known as "suspension bob."

Suspension bob has three main causes:

- Rider weight shift due to their pedaling stroke
- The chain tension acting on the suspension
- The suspension squatting or jacking due to acceleration forces.

On bikes which are subject to bob, the following two techniques can reduce it.

- Increase the compression damping of the suspension
- Increase the spring rate of the suspension

However, neither of these solutions are ideal as they hinder the suspension's ability to absorb small bumps or low-speed impacts while the bicycle is coasting (Note: "low-speed" does not refer to the velocity at which the vehicle is traveling, but the speed at which the suspension is compressed). In the case of excessive compression damping, this problem is known as overdamping.

The DW-link uses an anti-squat suspension design to counteract forces responsible for "suspension bob" and consequently removes the need for excessive compression damping. This allows the suspension to be much more active over low-speed impacts, allowing more traction.

== Mechanics ==
The DW-link uses anti-squat to eliminate "suspension bob." Squat is defined as the tendency of rear suspension to compress under acceleration. The anti-squat used in the DW-link system is achieved by a minimisation of torque about the centre of mass. The DW-link system has also been designed to minimise pedal feedback caused by suspension travel.

Another major advantage of the DW-link is the lack of need of a floating brake system to achieve optimum suspension performance under braking. Typically, on single pivot suspension systems, a large amount of squat is experienced under braking without a floating brake design. Subsequently, the suspension is less active under braking, resulting in a diminished amount of traction.

The dw-link design is engineered to balance the effects of acceleration and braking forces in order to improve traction and efficiency. It uses a kinematic suspension force called "position sensitive anti-squat." When a vehicle accelerates the suspension reacts (typically in the form of suspension compression) to a phenomenon called load transfer. The position-sensitive anti-squat of dw-link offsets the rearward load transfer that happens during vehicle acceleration. This unique attribute is mathematically proven to reduce efficiency losses, while improving traction, and bump sensitivity, and if properly engineered, will help minimize perceptible pedal feedback, when compared to other methods of achieving a similar offset of load transfer.
