= IBX =

IBX may refer to:

- 2-Iodoxybenzoic acid, a reagent in organic chemistry
- Independence Blue Cross, a Philadelphia-based health insurance company
- An abbreviation for North Carolina's Inner Banks
- IBX Group, a Swedish company
- Interborough Express (IBX), a proposed light rail line in New York City
- International Business Exchange, a global data center facility operated by Equinix, a global provider of data center and interconnection services

== See also ==
- MOS:IBX, a shortcut for Wikipedia:Manual of Style/Infoboxes
- IIBX (short for India International Bullion Exchange)
- Ibex (disambiguation)
  - Ibex, some species of wild goat
- IBOX (short for iodo-benzoxepin?), a psychedelic drug
- IBox (short for Internet in a Box), a network connection software package
