= Ibex (disambiguation) =

Ibex are various mountain goat species.

Ibex or IBEX, may also refer to:

== Places ==
- Ibex, Kentucky, United States
- Ibex Peak (Montana), United States
- Ibex Valley, Canada

== Transport ==
- Interstellar Boundary Explorer (IBEX), a spacecraft
- Ibex (vehicle), a 4WD/SUV car
- Ibex Airlines, Japan
- Ibex P&O ferry
- Ibex, a model line of CFMoto dual-sport motorcycles

== Other uses ==
- IBEX (surveillance), United States–Iranian project to build observation and listening posts in Iran
- IBEX 35, Spanish market stock index
- Ibex Outdoor Clothing
- Ibex (band) (also known as Wreckage), a late 1960s band notable for featuring future Queen vocalist Freddie Mercury
- Ibex (company), American company
- Ibex Publishers, US-based book company founded in 1979 and focused on material about Iran, in English and Persian
- Chumik Glacier Conflict (1989), 1984 Indian military operation, part of the Siachen conflict in Kashmir

== See also ==
- Intrepid Ibex, code name for Ubuntu 8.10 operating system
- Ibis (disambiguation)
