= José María Vargas Vila =

Colombian writer (1860–1933)

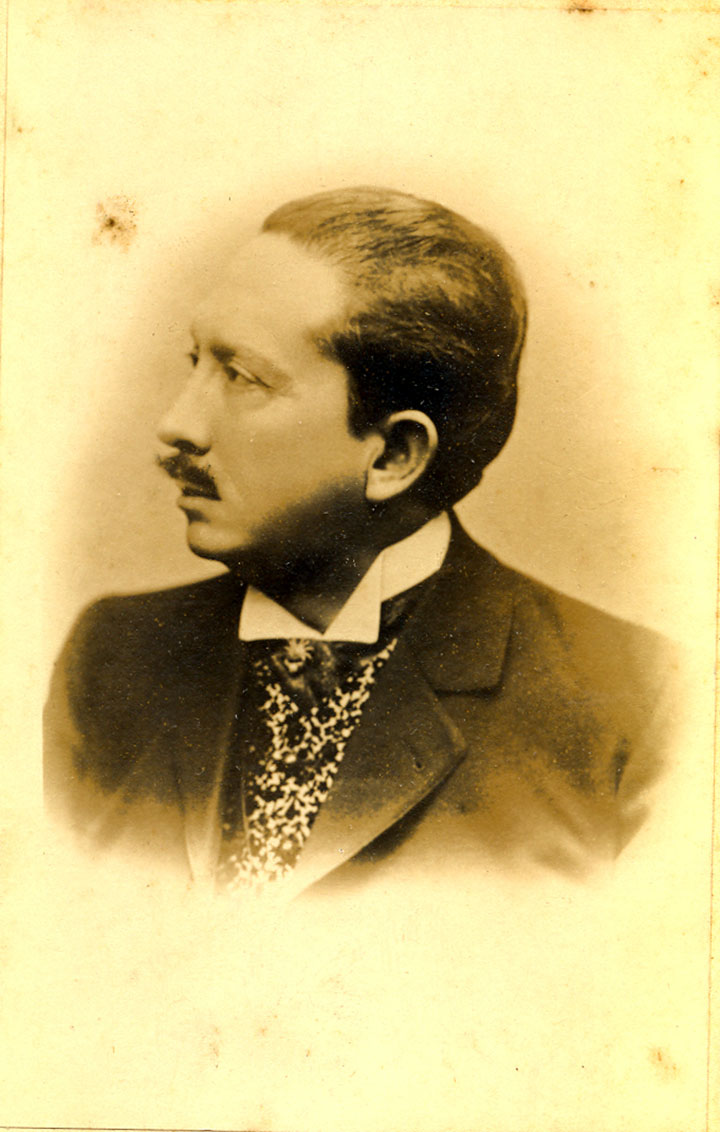
- Born: 23 June 1860; Bogotá, Colombia
- Died: 23 May 1933 (aged 72); Barcelona, Spain
- Occupations: Novelist, journalist, publisher, political activist, and short story writer.

José María de la Concepción Apolinar Vargas Vila Bonilla (23 June 1860 – 23 May 1933), commonly referred to as José María Vargas Vila, was a Colombian writer and public intellectual.

Vargas Vila was an autodidact, who, from an early age, participated in political struggles as a journalist, political agitator, and orator. He opposed presidents Rafael Núñez y Rafael Reyes.

He was considered one of the most controversial writers in the Americas at the beginning of the twentieth century. Vargas Vila distinguished himself through his radically liberal ideas and his criticism of the Catholic clergy, conservatism, and the imperialist policies of the United States. Many of his ideas approached those of existentialism and were claimed to be libertarian, although they were so close to anarchism that at one time even Vargas Vila declared himself an anarchist. He defended all causes and individuals who fought for their peoples' liberty and justice, especially in Latin America, without harping on whether they all shared his exact same philosophy, and knowing that they did not.

His first novel, Aura o las violetas, was published in 1887 in Venezuela.

The publication of his novel Ibis in 1900 caused him to be excommunicated by the Holy See, a development that pleased him.

== Bibliography ==
- Aura o las violetas. 1887.
- Pasionarias, álbum para mi madre muerta. 1887.
- Emma, Maracaibo. 1888 (En una publicación literaria).
- Aura o las violetas; Emma. 1889.
- Lo irreparable. 1889.
- Los Providenciales. 1892.
- Flor de fango. 1895.
- Ibis. 1900.
- A la hora del crepúsculo. 1900?
- Alba roja, París. 1901.
- Las rosas de la tarde. 1901.
- Ante los bárbaros: el Yanki. He ahí el enemigo. 1902.
- Copos de espuma. 1902.
- Los divinos y los humanos.1904.
- La simiente, París. 1906.
- Laureles rojos. 1906.
- El canto de las sirenas en los mares de la historia. 1906?
- Los Césares de la decadencia. 1907.
- El camino del triunfo. 1909.
- La república romana. 1909.
- La conquista de Bizancio. 1910.
- La voz de las horas. 1910.
- Hombres y crímenes del Capitolio. 1910?
- El ritmo de la vida: motivos para pensar. 1911.
- Huerto agnóstico; Cuadernos de un solitario. 1911.
- Rosa mística; mes nouvelles. 1911.
- Ibis. 1911?, Novela, edición completa.
- Políticas e históricas (páginas escogidas). 1912.
- El imperio romano. 1912?
- Archipiélago sonoro, poemas sinfónicos. 1913.
- Ars-verba. 1913.
- En las zarzas del Horeb. 1913.
- El alma de los lirios. 1914.
- El rosal Pensante. 1914.
- La muerte del cóndor; del Poema de la tragedia y de la historia. 1914.
- Los parias.
- Pretéritas, Prólogo de R. Palacio Viso. 1915.
- Clepsidra roja. 1915?
- En las cimas. 1915?
- La demencia de Job. 1916. (Novela).
- Prosas selectas. 1916.
- María Magdalena. 1916? (Novela).
- Ante los bárbaros (los Estados Unidos y la Guerra) el yanki: he ahí el enemigo 1917.
- El cisne blanco (novela psicológica). 1917.
- Eleonora (novela de la vida artística). 1917.
- Los discípulos de Emaüs (novela de la vida intelectual). 1917.
- María Magdalena; novela lírica. 1917.
- Rubén Darío. 1917.
- El huerto del silencio. 1917?
- Horario reflexivo. 1917?
- Los estetas de Teópolis. 1918.
- Páginas escogidas. 1918.
- La ubre de la loba, Barcelona. 1918?
- El minotauro. 1919.
- Cachorro de león (novela de almas rústicas). 1920.
- De los viñedos de la eternidad. 1920.
- De sus lises y de sus rosas. 1920.
- El final de un sueño. 1920.
- Libre estética. 1920.
- Salomé, novela poema. 1920.
- Belona dea orbi. 1921.
- El huerto del silencio. 1921.
- Prosas-laudes, Barcelona. 1921.
- Gestos de vida. 1922.
- Mis mejores cuentos. 1922.
- Saudades tácitas. 1922.
- Némesis. 1923.
- Antes del último sueño (páginas de un vademécum). 1924.
- Mi viaje a la Argentina; odisea romántica. 1924?
- La cuestión religiosa en México. 1926.
- Los Soviets. Con Carta-prólogo de D. Oscar Pérez Solís. 1926.
- Odisea romántica; diario de viaje a la República Argentina. 1927.
- Dietario crepuscular. 1928.
- La novena sinfonía. 1928?
- Lirio negro. Germania. 1930.
- Lirio rojo. Eleonora. 1930.
- Sobre las viñas muertas.1930.
- Tardes serenas. 1930.
- Lirio blanco. Delia. 1932.
- El maestro. 1935.
- El joyel mirobolante (desfile de visiones). 1937.
- José Martí: apóstol-libertador. 1938.
- El sendero de las almas: novelas cortas. Sin fecha.
- Históricas y Políticas. Sin fecha.
- Poemas sinfónicos, Barcelona. Sin fecha.
- Polen lírico, conferencias. Sin fecha.
- Sombras de Águilas. Sin fecha.

== Bibliography ==
- La Gran Enciclopedia de Colombia del Círculo de Lectores, "Biographical Profile of José María Vargas Vila" (Banco de la Republica)
- Raul Salazar Pazos 2008 biography and founder of the diary of Vargas Vila Vargas Vila.com
- Cobo Borda, Juan Gustavo 1980 "El divino iracundo"; Semana 1112, 12 de noviembre de 1980.
- Sánchez, Ricardo 1981 "El Anti-imperialismo de Vargas Vila", Prólogo de Ante los Bárbaros. Bogotá: Editorial La Oveja Negra.
- Vargas Arango, María Isabel 1993 "José maría Vargas Vila"; Gran Enciclopedia de Colombia del Círculo de Lectores, tomo de biografías.
- Complete Works of José María Vargas Vila "Free Esthetic"
