= White ibis =

White ibis may refer to several birds:

- American white ibis, Eudocimus albus
- Australian white ibis, Threskiornis molucca
  - Solomons white ibis or Solomon Islands white ibis, Threskiornis (molucca) pygmaeus
- Asiatic white ibis, an alternative name for the black-headed ibis, Threskiornis melanocephala

== See also ==
- Ibis (disambiguation)
