= USS Satilla =

Patrol vessel of the United States Navy

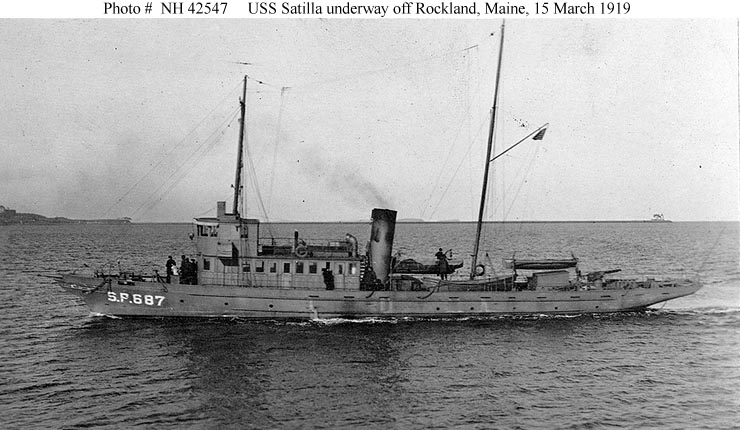
- USS Satilla (SP-687) off Rockland, Maine, on 15 March 1919.

History

United States
- Name: USS Satilla
- Namesake: Previous name retained
- Builder: George Lawley & Son, Neponset, Massachusetts
- Completed: 1902
- Acquired: 17 May 1917
- Commissioned: 31 May 1917
- Decommissioned: 1919
- Stricken: 7 November 1919
- Fate: Sold 25 March 1920
- Notes: Operated as private yacht Satilla 1902-1917, in Maine Naval Militia as Saltilla 1917, and as private yacht Edith 1920-1927, then as fishing vessel

General characteristics
- Type: Patrol vessel
- Tonnage: 106 gross register tons
- Length: 128 ft (39 m)
- Beam: 16 ft 6 in (5.03 m)
- Draft: 7 ft (2.1 m)
- Propulsion: Steam engine, one shaft
- Speed: 14 knots
- Complement: 28
- Armament: 1 × 3-pounder gun; 1 × machine gun

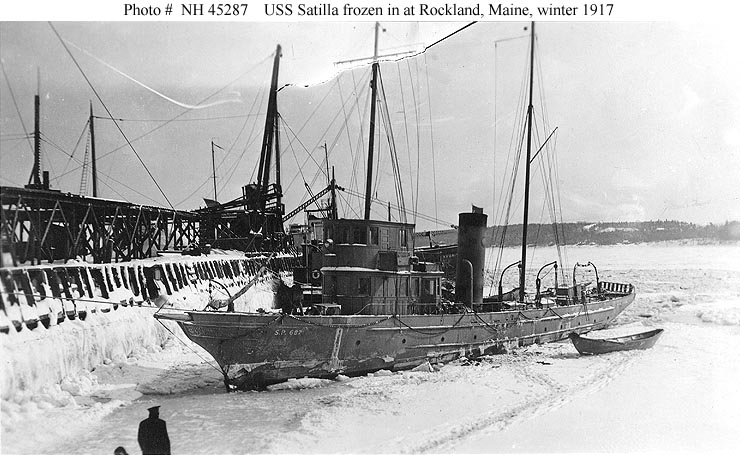
USS Satilla (SP-687) frozen in the winter ice at the Rockland Section Base at Rockland, Maine, late in 1917.

USS Satilla (SP-687) was a United States Navy patrol vessel in commission from 1917 to 1919.

== Construction and acquisition ==
Satilla was built as a private steam yacht of the same name by George Lawley & Son at Neponset, Massachusetts, in 1902. After the death of her owner, R. Hall McCormick of Chicago, Illinois, the State of Maine purchased her from McCormick's estate in May 1917 for the local use of the section patrol commander at Rockland, Maine. On 17 May 1917, the U.S. Navy purchased Satilla from the State of Maine for use as a section patrol boat during World War I. She began operating with the Maine Naval Militia on 24 May 1917, patrolling the Maine coast. The Navy commissioned her as USS Saltilla (SP-687) on 31 May 1917 and she was enrolled in the Naval Coast Defense Reserve on 18 June 1917.

== U.S. Navy service ==
Satilla carried out patrol duties off Rockland and Bath, Maine, for the rest of World War I, frequently lying to overnight at Cross Island, Winter Harbor, and Cutler Harbor. On 1 September 1917, she served as one of the escorts for the new destroyer USS Manley (Destroyer No. 74) during Manley's sea trials off Bath.

While lying alongside the Hodge Boiler Works pier at Boston in mid-1918, Satilla was accidentally rammed by the minesweeper USS Ibis (SP-3051) and suffered considerable damage. Although her hull was buckled in on the port side and leaking, she was repaired over the next few months and returned to duty, although not until after the end of World War I.

== Disposal and later career ==
Satilla steamed to Boston, Massachusetts, on 19 September 1919, where she was placed in the custody of the Commandant, 1st Naval District. Stricken from the Navy List on 7 November 1919, Satilla was sold on 25 March 1920 to Oscar L. Ledberg of Providence, Rhode Island. Ledberg renamed her Edith, and used her as a yacht until 1927, when he sold her to Captain William Baletti of Hoboken, New Jersey. Baletti employed her thereafter as a fishing boat.
