= USS Ibis =

USS Ibis has been the name of more than one United States Navy ship, and may refer to:

- USS Ibis (SP-3051), a minesweeper in commission from 1918 to 1919
- USS Ibis (AM-134), a minesweeper in commission from 1942 to 1944
