= Interagency Border Inspection System =

U.S. border security database

The Interagency Border Inspection System (IBIS) is a United States computer-based system that provides the law enforcement community with files of common interest. IBIS provides access to the Federal Bureau of Investigation (FBI) National Crime Information Center (NCIC) and allows its users to interface with all 50 U.S. states via the National Law Enforcement Telecommunications System (NLETS). IBIS physically resides on the Treasury Enforcement Communications System (TECS) at a U.S. Customs and Border Protection data center.

Regulatory and law enforcement personnel from more than 20 federal agencies or bureaus use IBIS, including:

- Animal and Plant Health Inspection Service
- Bureau of Alcohol, Tobacco, Firearms and Explosives (ATF)
- Drug Enforcement Administration (DEA)
- Federal Aviation Administration (FAA)
- Federal Bureau of Investigation (FBI)
- Internal Revenue Service (IRS)
- Interpol
- U.S. Customs and Border Protection (CBP)
- United States Coast Guard
- United States Department of State (for use by Consular Officers at United States embassies and consulates)
- United States Secret Service (USSS)

Field access is provided by a network with more than 24,000 IBIS terminals, located at ports of entry including border checkpoints, seaports, and airports to track information on suspect individuals, businesses, vehicles, aircraft, and watercraft. IBIS terminals can also be used to access records on wanted persons, stolen vehicles, vessels or firearms, license information, criminal histories, and previous federal inspections, allowing the border enforcement agencies to focus their limited resources on those potential non-compliant travelers.
