= Moots Cycles =

American bicycle manufacturer

- Company type: Private
- Industry: Bicycles
- Founded: Colorado, 1981; 45 years ago
- Headquarters: Steamboat Springs, Colorado, USA
- Website: www.moots.com

Moots Cycles is an American bicycle manufacturer located in Steamboat Springs, Colorado. Founded in 1981 by Kent Eriksen, who is now a member of the Mountain Bike Hall of Fame, Moots has been identified as a source for innovation in the bicycle industry since its inception.

== History ==
Originally, Moots was one of the first companies manufacturing and promoting mountain bikes. Since 1991, Moots has been manufacturing both mountain bikes and road bicycles from titanium, and has earned praise from the press for the quality of manufacture, light weight, and "supple ride" of their bicycles.

Moots frames have always been hand-built. In 2005 they were one of the more expensive frames on the market. Titanium is synonymous with Moots and they are famous for their 'stack-o'-dimes' welds.

== Components ==
Throughout its history, Moots has been known for the innovative bicycle components they design and manufacture. In the 1980s, Eriksen designed the company's "Moots Mounts," clamp-on cantilever posts which could be removed or repositioned using only an allen wrench. Another innovation was an early version of what became known as "bar ends" in the 1990s. The product made by Moots clamped inside the brake levers and had large wooden balls at the ends.

Moots has also made handlebars and stems by hand since its founding, as well as sells accessories such as saddlebags and seat packs.
