= USS Ibis (SP-3051) =

Minesweeper of the United States Navy

History

United States
- Name: USS Ibis
- Namesake: The ibis
- Builder: Globe Shipbuilding Company, Superior, Wisconsin
- Completed: 1917
- Acquired: June 1918
- Commissioned: 19 August 1918
- Fate: Returned to owner 3 March 1919
- Notes: Operated as commercial fishing trawler Sea Gull 1917-1918 and from 1919

General characteristics
- Type: Minesweeper
- Tonnage: 299 gross register tons
- Length: 141 ft 5 in (43.10 m)
- Beam: 23 ft 3 in (7.09 m)
- Draft: 13 ft 6 in (4.11 m) mean
- Speed: 11 knots
- Armament: 1 × 3-inch (76.2-mm) gun; 2 × machine guns

The first USS Ibis (SP-3051), also listed as USS Ibis (ID-3051), was a United States Navy minesweeper in commission from 1918 to 1919.

Ibis was built as the commercial fishing trawler Sea Gull by the Globe Shipbuilding Company at Superior, Wisconsin, in 1917. In June 1918, the U.S. Navy acquired her from her owner, the Atlantic Coast Fisheries Company of New York City, for use as a minesweeper during World War I. She was commissioned on 19 August 1918 as USS Ibis (SP-3051 or, perhaps retrospectively, ID-3051).

Assigned to the 1st Naval District in northern New England, Ibis operated for the remainder of World War I and into 1919. Sometime in mid-1918 she accidentally rammed the patrol vessel USS Satilla (SP-687) while Satilla was alongside the Hodge Boiler Works pier at Rockville, Maine. Satilla suffered considerable damage, with her hull buckled in on the port side and leaking, and was under repair for the next few months, not returning to duty until after the end of World War I.

Ibis was decommissioned after the end of World War I and was returned to her owner on 3 March 1919.
