= Hayes Brake =

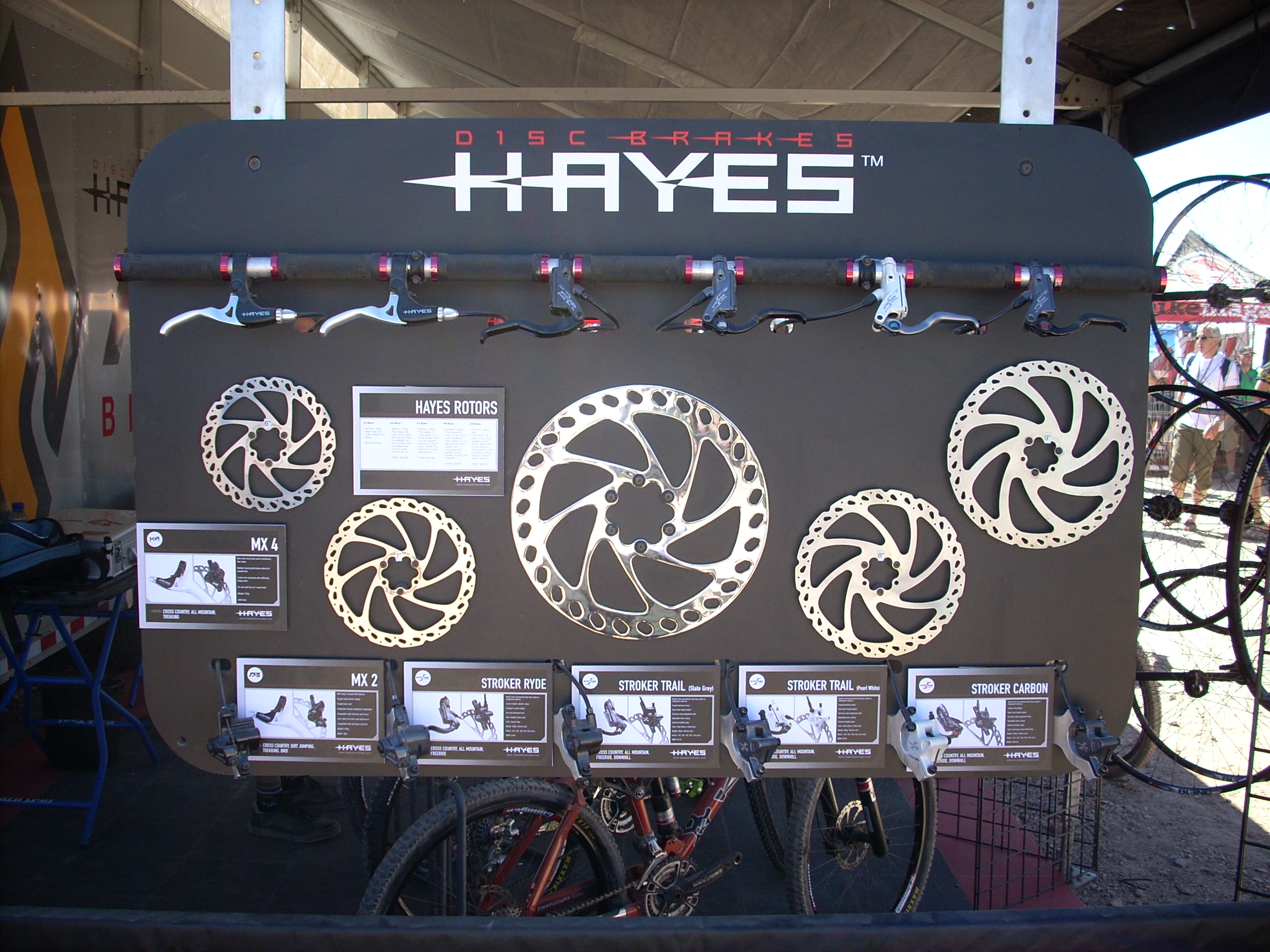
Various Hayes disk brake rotors.

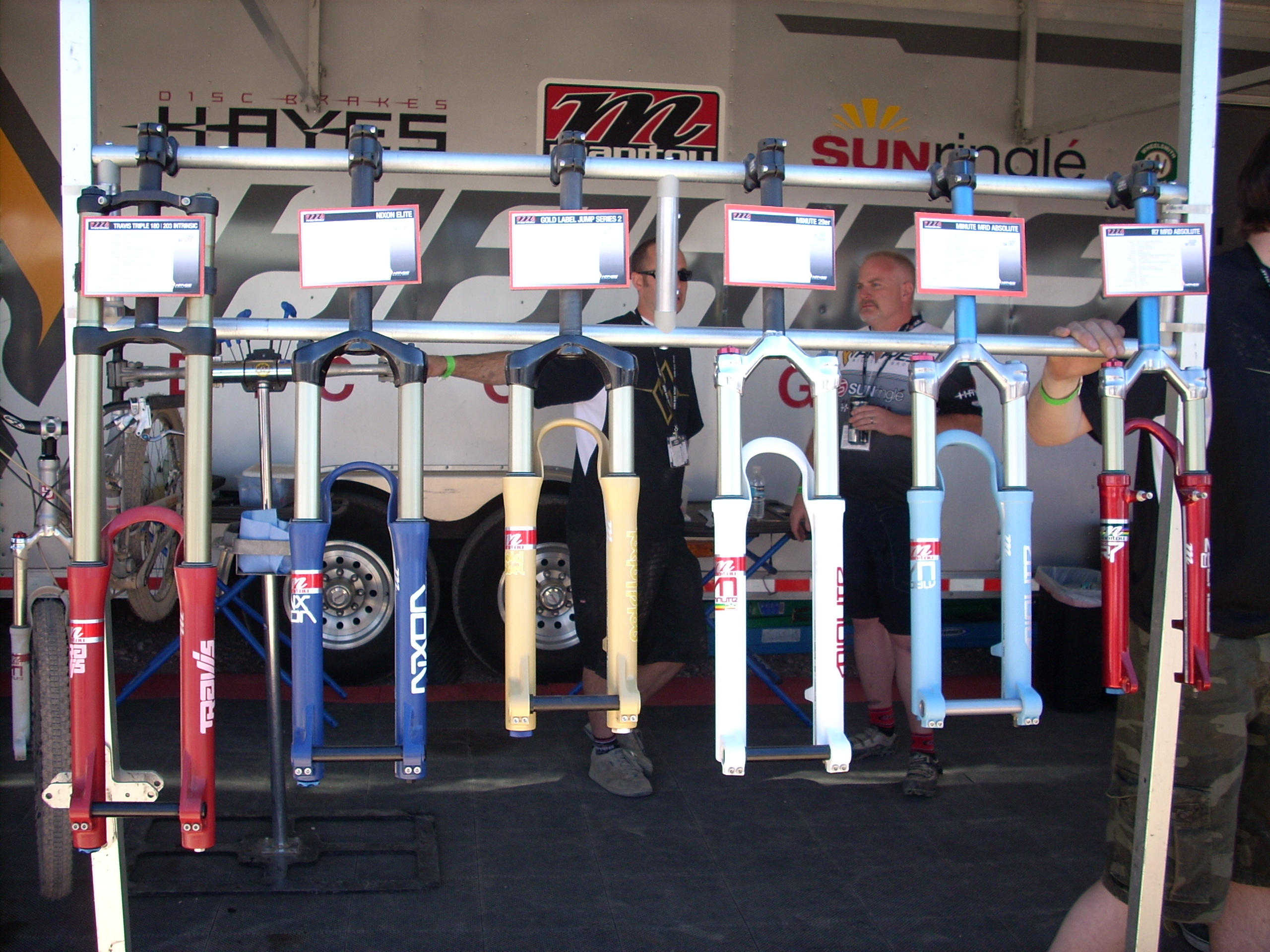
Answer Manitou forks.

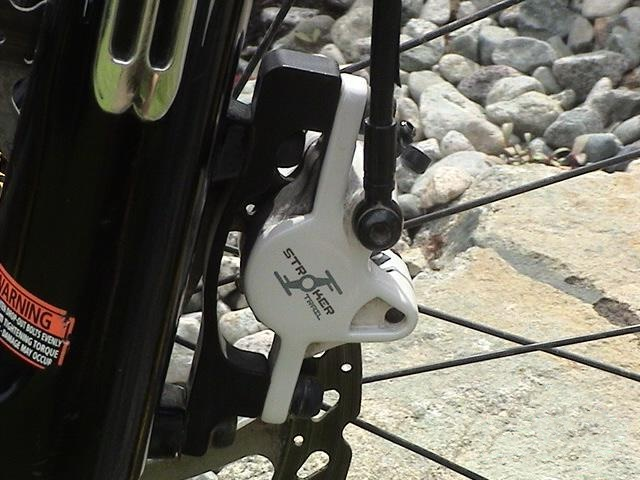
Hayes Stroker Trail Caliper

Hayes Brake, (stylized as HAYES), is a Milwaukee, Wisconsin designer and manufacturer of disc brakes and disc brake systems for non-automotive applications, including Hayes Disc Brake specialising in disc brakes for bikes. In 2005 the company's nine-member management team bought Hayes Brake with Nautic Partners, a private equity firm, and renamed the company HB Performance Systems Inc.

Hayes Bicycle Group has acquired Sun Ringle hubs, rims, wheels and components, WheelSmith Fabrications, Inc. and Answer/Manitou.

As of mid-2023 Hayes Brake has become a subsidiary of Hayes Bicycle, which itself is a subsidiary of Hayes Performance Systems.
