= Ibis (novel) =

1900 novel by José María Vargas Vila

- Book cover for Ibis (1917 edition)
- Author: José María Vargas Vila
- Language: Spanish
- Published: 1900
- Publication place: Colombia

Ibis is a novel by the Colombian writer José María Vargas Vila, written in Rome in 1900.

It tells the story of Teodoro, a man deeply in love, betrayed by the woman he loves. Under the supervision of the Teacher, he must opt for the murder or suicide of that same woman, giving him a dark side towards women, which the teacher has taken himself to do with Teodoro. Passionate and cruel, misogynist and hedonistic, the work repeatedly attacks the Church and love, in defense of sexual pleasures, reason aesthetics and atheism, thus showing a rustic style of work when treating women.

He was excommunicated by the Catholic Church in 1900 on the publication of his novel Ibis and received the news with joy.
