= Ibex Outdoor Clothing =

American wool clothing producer

Ibex Outdoor Clothing, LLC
- Type: LLC
- Founded: Woodstock, Vermont, U.S. (1997)
- Founder: Peter Helmetag; John Fernsell
- Headquarters: New York, New York, U.S.
- Website: http://www.ibex.com

Ibex Outdoor Clothing, LLC is a producer of wool outdoors clothing. Between 2014 and 2017 sales averaged US$20 Million.

== History ==
Ibex was founded in 1997 in response to a perceived gap for non-Gore-Tex and polyester outdoors clothing.In February 2018 after the company's struggles in the outdoor market which led to the company laying off a third of its staff in November. Ibex relaunched in October 2019 under the ownership of Flour Fund, which purchased the brand in early 2018, and is now based in Boulder, Colorado.
