= IBIS (server) =

On-line database of protein interactions

IBIS (server) (Inferred Biomolecular Interaction Server) is a server developed at National Institutes of Health. It reports, predicts and integrates multiple types of conserved interactions for protein.

== Philosophy ==
The knowledge of protein structures may facilitate and improve the annotation of protein function and the characterization of protein binding partners and binding sites. A database and server IBIS (Inferred Biomolecular Interaction Server, www.ncbi.nlm.nih.gov/Structure/ibis/ibis.cgi) developed at NCBI, National Institutes of Health, reports, predicts and integrates multiple types of conserved interactions for proteins. It provides tools to analyze biomolecular interactions observed in a given protein structure together with the complex set of interactions inferred from its close homologs. IBIS identifies and predicts proteins' interaction partners together with the locations of the corresponding binding sites on the protein query. It provides annotations of binding sites for protein-protein, protein- small molecule, protein - nucleic acid, protein - peptide and protein - ion interactions.

IBIS also allows the mapping of a biomolecular interaction network for any given organism, human interactome derived from structural complexes is available at ftp://ftp.ncbi.nih.gov/pub/mmdb/humanIntNw/.

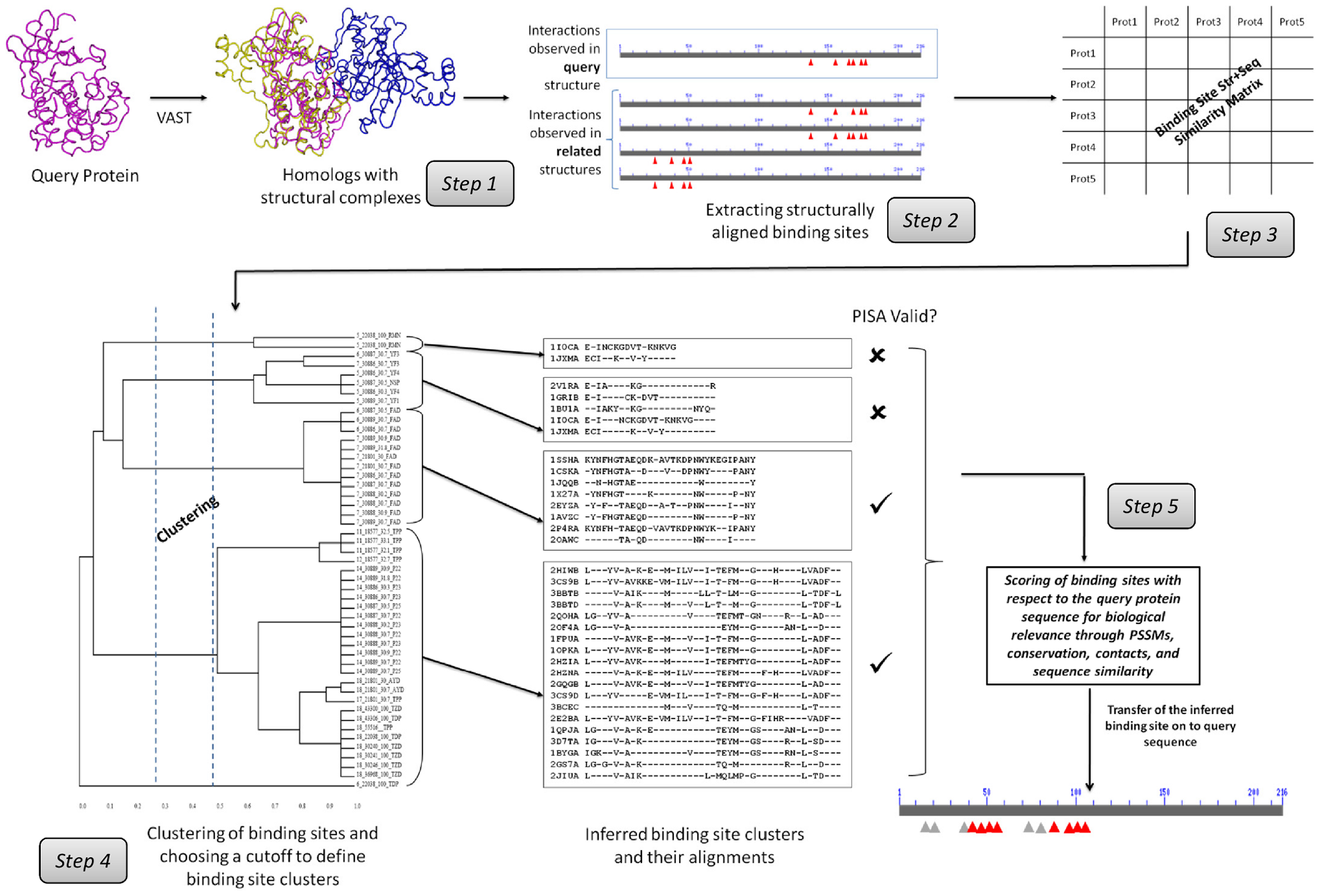

To focus on biologically relevant binding sites, IBIS clusters similar binding sites found in homologous proteins based on the sites’ conservation of sequence and structure. Binding sites which appear evolutionarily conserved among non-redundant sets of homologous proteins are given higher priority. After binding sites are clustered, Position Specific Score Matrices (PSSMs) are constructed from the corresponding binding site alignments. Together with other measures, the PSSMs are subsequently used to rank binding sites to assess how well they match the query, and to gauge the biological relevance of binding sites with respect to the query.
