= Turner Suspension Bicycles =

American bicycle frame manufacturer

Turner Suspension Bicycles, inc.
- Company type: Private
- Industry: Bicycles
- Founded: 1994; 32 years ago
- Headquarters: Murrieta, California
- Products: Bicycles and related components
- Owner: David Turner
- Website: www.turnerbikes.com

Turner Suspension Bicycles, Inc. is an American bicycle frame manufacturer, based in Murrieta, California, specializing in full-suspension mountain bikes. Turner Bikes was founded in 1994 by David Turner, a former professional mountain bike rider who had ridden for the Marin and Mongoose teams. Turner had also worked with Horst Leitner at AMP Research whilst Horst developed the Horst Link suspension design.

== History ==
David Turner started designing his own bicycles in 1992. By 1993, he was riding his designs for the Mammoth Mountain Kamikaze Manufacturers Cup downhill race and finished 1st. In 1994, the first 150 production Turner mountain bike frames were built by Ventana Mountain Bikes USA. These bikes were known only as "the Turner bike" until reviewed by the magazine Mountain Bike Action, which dubbed it the "Turner Burner". This name would be applied to many of Turner's future designs. Burner had 2.75” inches rear travel with a down hill race option of 3.6 inches. To meet the demand for Turner's frames, production was carried out by FTW Manufacturing out of Arizona in 1995. Bernard Unhasibiscay, riding a prototype Turner Afterburner, won the veteran silver medal at the UCI World Championships Downhill.

By 1996, production had moved to Sportech. With this move came several improvements to the design of the Burner, including a single machined block to support the bottom bracket, rear shock mount, and chain stay swing-arm pivot. Another pivotal moment for the company was when the Turner Afterburner started production; it was Turner's first downhill-specific frame, had 3.6" of rear wheel travel, and was identified by the large plate gussets on the front. Turner's one-off tandem, the "Twin Burner", was produced in 1997. Reflecting the rapid change in mountain biking, the Afterburner was re-designed to have 6" of rear wheel travel. There were now large holes in the plate gussets. Thomas Misser, riding a Kona stickered Turner Afterburner, achieved multiple wins and podium places in UCI World Cup races. A limited number of Turner Afterburners were sold by Kona as "Misser replicas". The Turner range expanded to four models in 1998, as the Burner XC and Afterburner were joined by the Turner Stinger (cross-country racer) and the Turner RFX (freeride bike).

The Stinger design with its proprietary pull shock was licensed to K2 in 1999 and produced as the "K2 Razorback". The Burner was replaced by a lighter-weight Turner O2 and the beefier Turner XCE. Turner's first single-pivot suspension bike, the downhill race-specific Turner DH Javelin, was introduced. It was one of the first frames to have ISCG. The Turner DH Javelin was renamed Turner DH Racer (DHR) in 2000 and improved machining to the rear end. The RFX was strengthened and the travel increased to 150mm, while the front triangle of the DHR got its one-piece shock mount in 2002.

2003 turned out to be a banner year for Turner, as the Turner 5-spot was introduced. It soon became Turner's best-selling frame to date. The DHR received a makeover: A 12mm rear end and the linkage is altered giving the bike more travel. Eric Carter debuted his custom 'Mongoose Stickered' DHR and took the [NORBA] National Downhill Championship title. He then rode his custom 'one-off' DHR/Rail combination to the UCI World Cup 4-cross Champion Gold Medal and the NORBA National Mountain-cross Series Championship title. Production moved to SAPA, which manufactures the entire Turner range with both in-house tubesets and US-made tubesets sourced externally.

By 2004, the company could perform among other top bicycle brands. Several Turner models received honors this year: The Turner Burner won "The Best Full-Suspension XC Bike of the Year" Riders Award on mtbr.com and the Turner 5-Spot won "The Best Full-Suspension Freeride Bike of the Year" Riders Award on mtbr.com. This was the last year of the 3.5" Burner model.

Within the same year, Geoff Kabush rode his Turner Nitrous to NORBA championships in both the Elite Men's XC and the Short Track. Eric Carter rode his custom 'Mongoose' Turner to the UCI World Cup 4-cross Champion Gold Medal and the NORBA National Mountain-cross Series Championship title. The Turner DHR was remodeled with 8.5" of travel, 20mm dropouts on the rear with a 12mm axle, and a 1.5" headtube. Gone were the "classic" twin toptube and rounded downtube, to be replaced with box section tubing.

After design changes, Turner dropped the Romic shock on the DHR in 2005. It was to be replaced with the Fox DHX with a remote reservoir. Geoff Kabush continues to win NORBA championships in both the Elite Men's XC and the Short Track, again on a Turner Nitrous. Eric Carter rode his custom 'Mongoose' Turner to the NORBA National Mountain-cross Series Championship title. Eric Delsouiller won FFC French National championships in the Veteran DH (over 40) on a Turner DHR. The Turner Flux replaced the Turner Burner to fill the 4-inch cross-country slot.

Citing an increasingly difficult relationship with the license holders, Turner abandoned the use of the Horst Link on his designs in 2006. Turner adopted a similar seat stay single pivot design, with positive feedback from the cycling community. It was dubbed the TNT. The Turner Sultan, Turner's first 29-inch wheel mountain bike, debuted at Interbike 06. Geoff Kabush, riding for Turner Bicycles, broke the all-time NORBA short track win record and took the championship.

Eric Delsouiller took the downhill bronze medal at the 2007 UCI World Championships MTB Masters in Pra Loup in the 45-49 class on a Turner DHR, and was a gold medalist at the 2008 UCI World Championships MTB Masters in Pra Loup in the 50-54 class on a Turner DHR.

Also in 2008, the Turner Flux won "The Best Full-Suspension XC Bike of the Year" Riders Award on and the Turner Sultan won "The Best Full-Suspension 29er of the Year" Riders Award on mtbr.com. After over a year of design collaboration with David Weagle, David Turner announced that the 2009 models would all feature the DW-Link rear linkage. The TNT linkage would no longer be offered.

In 2009, Turner DW-Link models hit the shops. The Turner Sultan won "The Best Full-Suspension 29er of the Year" Riders Award on mtbr.com. Woman's Pro French rider Emmeline Ragot was the 2009 UCI World Downhill Champion on a Turner DHR.

The DW DHR model came out in April 2010 after one year of R&D and five prototypes. However, the Turner DW-Link DHR was recalled due to head tube cracking and was remade with a new head tube gusset..
