= Ibis (bicycle company) =

American bicycle company

Ibis Cycles
- Company type: Private
- Industry: Bicycles
- Founded: 1981; 45 years ago in Mendocino, California, US
- Headquarters: Santa Cruz, California, US
- Key people: Scot Nicol; Hans Heim; Tom Morgan; Roxy Lo; Colin Hughes
- Products: Mountain bikes; Gravel bikes; E-bikes; Bicycle components
- Number of employees: c. 40 (2024)
- Website: ibiscycles.com

Ibis Cycles is an American bicycle manufacturer headquartered in Santa Cruz, California. It produces the popular Mojo, Ripmo, and Ripley mountain bike frames among other models. Ibis products are distributed in 33 countries.

== History ==
Ibis Bicycles was founded by Scot Nicol, one of the earliest mountain bikers in Northern California. It began in Nicol's garage in 1981, when a friend asked him to build a frame. Nicol sold the company to an investment group in 2000 and it went bankrupt within 20 months. Ibis returned to the industry at the 2005 Interbike tradeshow. Hans Heim, a former co-owner of Bontrager Cycles and Santa Cruz Bicycles, partnered with Scot Nicol, Tom Morgan, and Roxy Lo to relaunch the brand. Colin Hughes, the Head of Engineering, would join later as a partner.

== Production ==
Ibis bicycle frames are primarily manufactured in Asia. In 2018, they began producing a small quantity of US made frames under the label Carbon 831. The majority of Ibis' frames are made of carbon fiber, but after an 18 year hiatus starting in 2001, the company resumed manufacturing aluminum frames in 2018.

== Innovation ==
While many companies came up with flattering names for their steel bike's tubing, such as Columbus and their "Genius" tubing, Nicol and Ibis called their tubing "Moron"—meaning it had more on the ends for strength and less in the middle to reduce weight, which became a standard practice in cycling called butted tubing. The Moron design was released in 1994.

They are also remembered for their sculpture-like "hand job" cable hanger, which resembled a fist reaching up and grabbing the rear brake cable. The Hand Job took an overlooked part of every other bike and made it a focal point for an Ibis, and as such symbolized the company.

The BowTi design released in 1998, was unique in being a full suspension frame that did not use pivots to separate the front and rear triangle. A complex system of flexible titanium tubes provided up to 5 inches (130 mm) of travel. Designed by John Castellano, 269 frames were produced until the 2002 closure. Castellano later formed his own company and continued to support the design.

== Sponsorship ==
Ibis Cycles sponsors Brian Lopes. Lopes also collaborated with Ibis Cycles in developing the "Lopes Link", a suspension upgrade for the Mojo and Mojo SL giving more handling precision.

In 2011, it sponsored Anne-Caroline Chausson.

In 2014 Brian Lopes amicably left Ibis cycles to pursue other efforts.

In 2016, Ibis launched an Enduro World Series Team. The team went on to win the Overall Team Title in 2017. The 2020 team roster includes Robin Wallner, Bex Baraona, and Cole Lucas.

In 2018 Brian Lopes returned to manage Ibis' new US enduro team.

== Additional reading ==
- "High-Tech Bicycle Toys at Interbike" by Daniel Drew Turner, ExtremeTech, October 7, 2005
- "Ibis flies again; industry vets pull brand from the grave", Bicycle Retailer, October 1, 2005
- "Ibis Moves Manufacturing to Montana" Total Bike, April 13, 2001.
- "Ibis Singlemalt" Singletrack mountain bike magazine, December 5, 2000.
