= Arc Vector =

Electric motorcycle

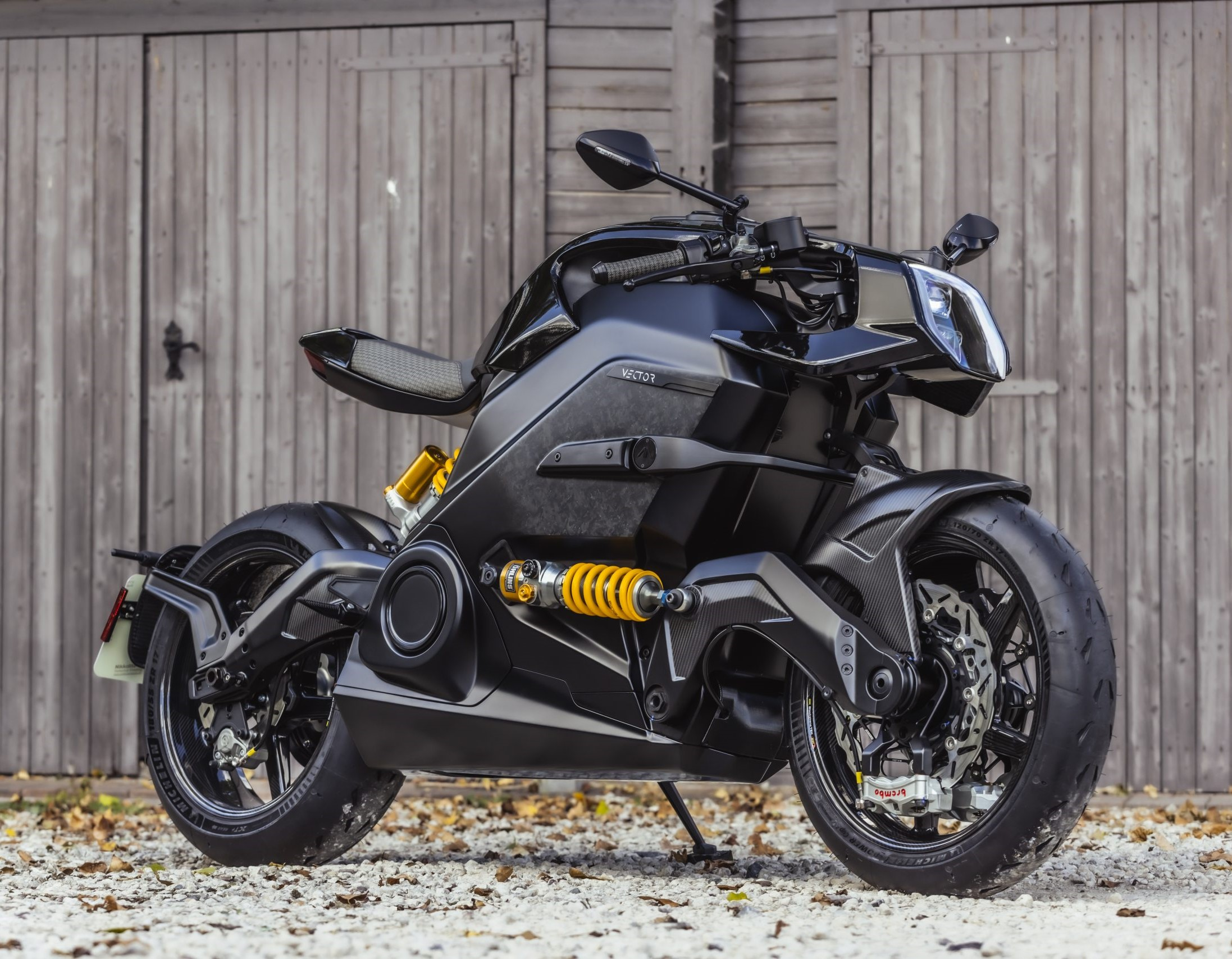
- Arc Vector, 2021
- Manufacturer: Arc Vehicles / Arc V
- Production: 2017–2019, 2022–2024
- Class: Sport bike
- Engine: Permanent magnet synchronous electric motor
- Power: 117 to 127 bhp (87 to 95 kW; 119 to 129 PS) @ 5,300 rpm
- Torque: 128 lb⋅ft (174 N⋅m)
- Transmission: 1-speed direct drive
- Frame type: Monocoque carbon-composite battery housing
- Suspension: Hub-center steering (front and rear)
- Brakes: Front and rear: Brembo Stylema
- Tires: Front: 120/70 R17; Rear: 180/55 R17
- Wheelbase: 57.1 in (1,450 mm)
- Dimensions: L: 2,100 mm (83 in); W: 385 mm (15.2 in)
- Seat height: 32.5 in (830 mm)
- Weight: 529 lb (240 kg) (wet)

Arc Vector is an electric motorcycle made by British motorcycle manufacturer Arc Vehicles from 2017 to 2019 and by the company's successor Arc V from 2022 to 2024. Both companies filed for bankruptcy, in 2019 and 2024 respectively. The later model sold a total of 11 units. The Vector had an expected range of 200 mi (320 km) on a full charge for road driving and 120 mi (190 km) at high-speed, and an advertised top speed of 124 mph (200 km/h). It was noted for its hub-center steering which handled similarly to a conventional motorcycle fork. Its retail price was 90,000 GBP.
