= Yamaha Slider =

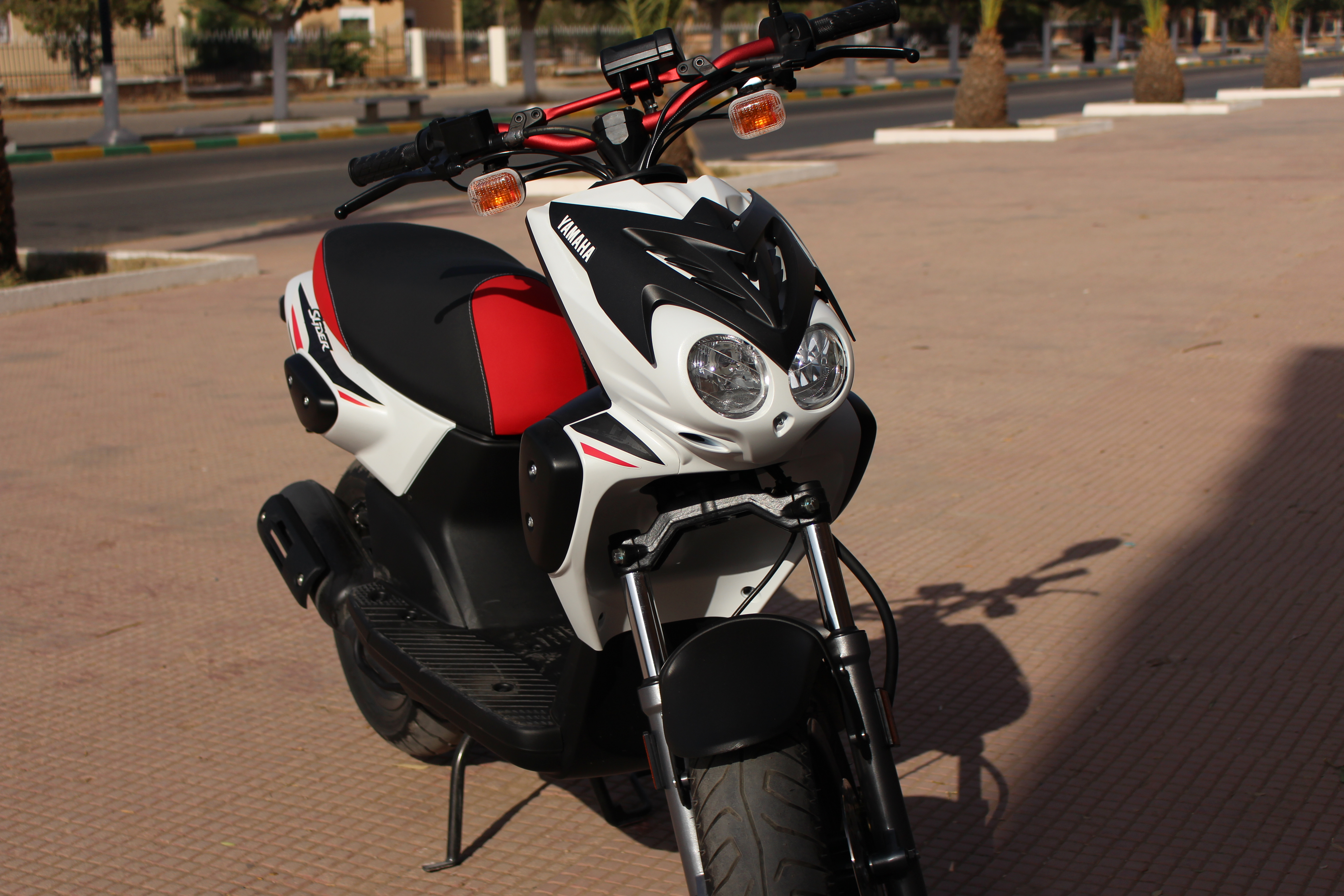
- Manufacturer: Yamaha Motor Company
- Production: 1999-2016
- Class: Scooter
- Engine: 49 cc (3.0 cu in), air cooled
- Ignition type: Digital
- Transmission: CVT automatic; gear final drive
- Frame type: Tubular steel spine
- Suspension: Front: telescopic fork

The Yamaha Slider is a scooter manufactured by the Japanese motorcycle manufacturer Yamaha Motor.

It was built in France and marketed in several countries, with MBK subsidiary naming it as MBK Stunt.

== Description ==
It features a 49 cm^{3} air-cooled two-stroke engine, delivering 2.5 kW (3.4 hp). The front wheel is equipped with a single disc brake, while the rear wheel with a drum brake. It can be started with both electric and kick start.

The tank holds 6.5 liters of fuel. The engine oil is contained in a separate 1.1-litre tank and is added automatically mixed with the fuel in a ratio of 1:72. The exhaust was equipped with a catalytic converter.

Unlike most scooters, the Slider does not have a helmet compartment under the seat, but it is still possible to attach a luggage rack and a rear top case.

During its marketing, the Slider was the cheapest scooter offered by Yamaha and differed from other models mainly in its design and relatively simple construction.

In 2008 it was the subject of a recall campaign due to a defect in the front brake hose.

== Bibliography ==
- Motosprint, N° June 2000, Test Honda Hornet, MBK Stunt, BMW C1
