= GG Duetto =

- Manufacturer: Grüter + Gut Motorradtechnik GmbH (GG)
- Production: 1994-1999
- Class: Sidecar
- Engine: 1,092 cc (67 cu in), inline four-cylinder, fuel injected 4 valve per cylinder, liquid cooled
- Power: 100 hp (66 kW) @ 8000 rpm
- Torque: 107 N.M. at 5,599 rpm
- Transmission: 5 speed, 4 Speed with optional reverse
- Frame type: Square tube cradle frame
- Suspension: Front: single sided GG swingarm with hub-center steering and adjustable gas shock absorber Rear: BMW single sided swingarm with adjustable shock absorber Sidecar chassis made of sealed square steel tubes. Wheel suspension with trapezoid and single shock absorber
- Brakes: Front: internally ventilated disc, 8 piston caliper, electronic ABS Rear: disc and 2 piston caliper, electronic ABS Sidecar: disc and 2-piston caliper, electronic ABS
- Tires: 185/50-14 VR front, 195/50-15 VR rear, 185/50-14 VR sidecar
- Wheelbase: 67 inches (1,700 mm)
- Dimensions: L: 95 inches (2,400 mm); W: 60 inches (1,500 mm)
- Seat height: 30 inches (760 mm)
- Weight: 410 kg (904 lb) (dry)
- Fuel capacity: 38 L (8.4 imp gal; 10 US gal)
- Related: GG Quad, GG Spartico, GG Cruso, GG Quadster

The GG Duetto was sold as motorcycle-sidecar combination built by Swiss manufacturer Grüter + Gut Motorradtechnik GmbH (GG) between 1994 and 1999. Approximately 30 units were produced.

Unlike a traditional sidecar added to a motorcycle, the GG Duetto is built to function only as a sidecar. While many manufacturers offer kits to convert existing motorcycles for sidecar operation, the GG Duetto was only sold as a fully assembled vehicle not registered as a vehicle produced by BMW motorcycles.

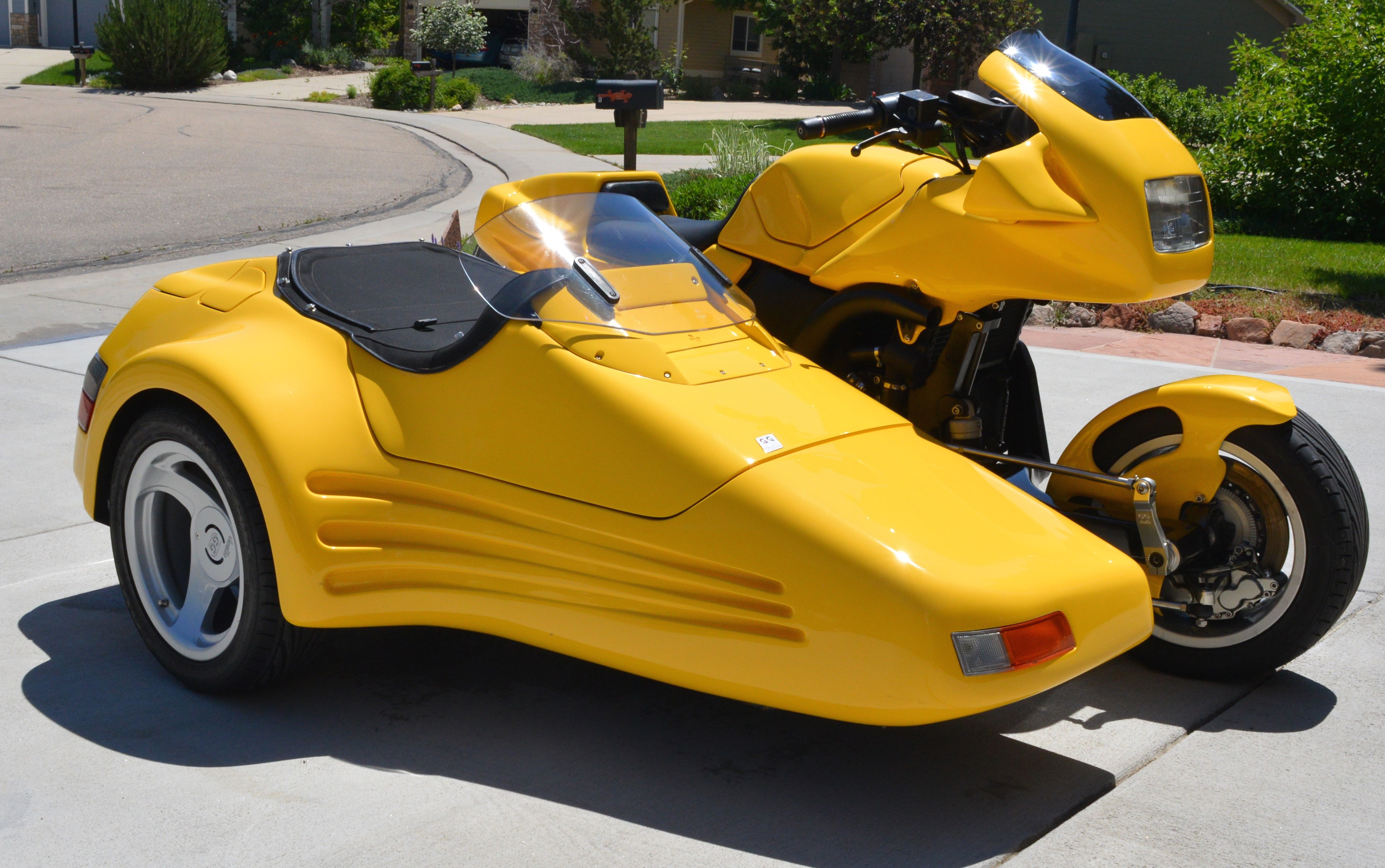

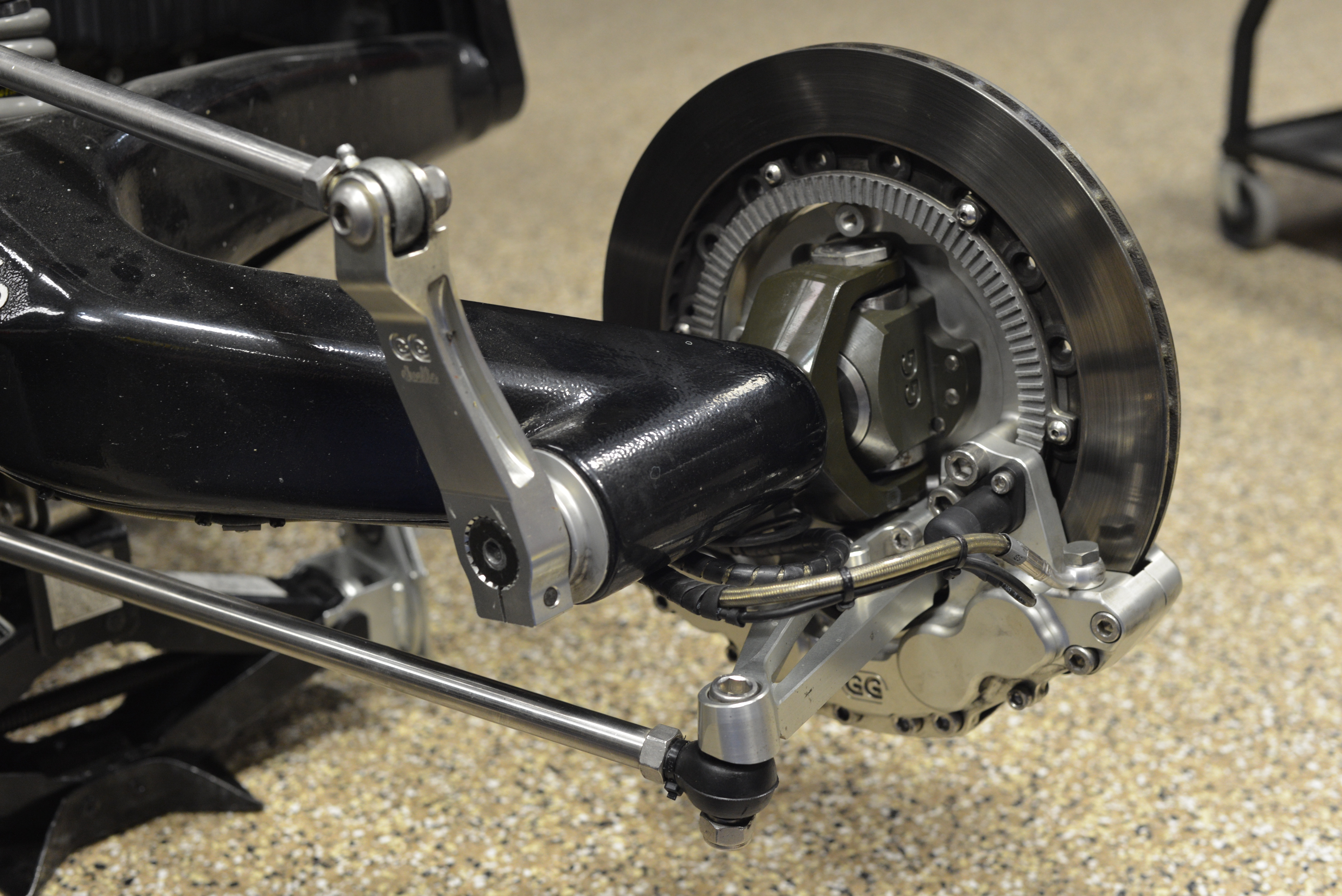

== Technical data ==
- Aluminum single-sided swingarm
- Hub-center steering
- GG built eight piston front brake caliper
- Electric motor operated sidecar access
- Antilock brakes on all three wheels
- Specific built Marchesini wheels
- Electrically height adjustable sidecar windscreen
- GFK laminate body

== Reviews ==
- Cycle World August 1996 Issue

== See also ==
- Krauser Domani
