= Mead & Tomkinson racing =

Motorcycle and car dealership

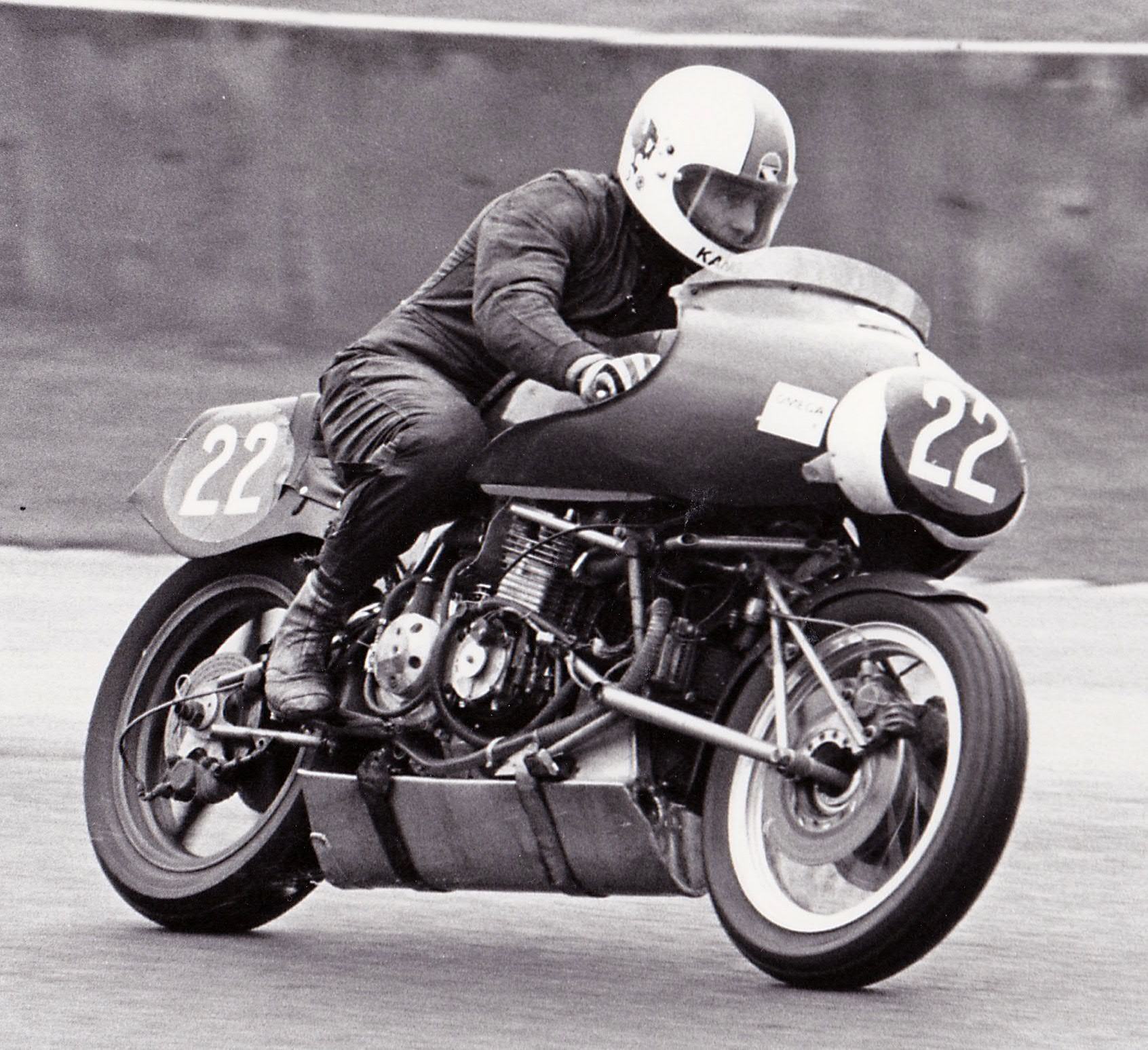
'Nessie', a Kawasaki Z1000-engined Endurance racer showing the hub-centre steering, aluminium belly fuel tank and upswept exhausts routed over the engine and beneath a dummy fuel-tank

Mead & Tomkinson was a motorcycle and car dealership in Hereford, Monmouth and Tewkesbury, in the UK. Three of the Tomkinsons, sons Chris and Patrick, and their father, Mike, successfully built and fielded racing motorcycles. They concentrated on the Isle of Man TT and on 24-hour and 8-hour endurance races at Spa, Barcelona, Thruxton and the Le Mans Bol d'Or. One of their riders was Neil Tuxworth (later head of Honda HRC UK racing team).

== Racing achievements ==
A production-based BSA 441 cc Victor with race-styled control adaptations was first entered by Mead & Tomkinson in the April, 1967 Motor Cycle 500-miler endurance event at Brands Hatch ridden by Alan Peck and Tony Wood, followed by the Barcelona 24-hour race in September.

A race-prepared successor to the previous Victor model, a BSA B50 Gold Star 500 ridden by Nigel Rollason and Clive Brown, won the 500 cc class in the 1971 Thruxton 500-miler, a long-distance event for production road machines, completing 201 laps beating the second place Suzuki T500 with 194 laps.

Other 1971 successes were the Barcelona 24 hours (at the Montjuïc circuit), and the Zolder 24 hour race outright.

In 1973 Michael Tomkinson, having striven for an outright win at Barcelona since 1967 against larger-engine machines, had intended to enter two 500 cc BSA 'Gold Star' machines in the 'prototype' (track-based class) but a full entry list meant his bikes had to be de-tuned to road-type specification, running against larger race-bikes. Road-type Dunlop TT100 tyres were used in preference to racing tyres due to their longevity. A rear chain oiler limited the need for chain servicing. Pits stops were regular fuel stops (calculated on a 60 miles-per-UK-gallon basis) and rider changes every two hours.

Tomkinson's race strategy was to have the two bikes circulating at different cadences, where whichever of the two was leading would employ a strategy of pressuring their nearest competitor, with the other bike circulating as a reserve without taking risks, hoping to pick up places if competitors succumbed to mechanical failure. Although this race-tactic worked at first, unfortunately the lead bike crashed-out in flames when ridden by Phil Gurner, partnered by Clive Brown. The second-string bike ridden by Nigel Rollason and Roger Bowler circulated steadily, achieving 686 laps in the 24-hours, finishing fourth overall (including and against machines in the 'prototype' class) and winning the 500 cc Production (road-machine) class.

A Mead & Tomkinson BSA B50 ridden by Phil Gurner once held the 500 cc class lap record in the 10-lap Production TT, set during the 1975 race when he finished in place 29 with co-rider Dave Savile.

For 1974, Mike Tomkinson conceived a large-capacity endurance racer based on a 1000 cc Laverda 3C (as a 'test-bed' for a more-radical future build) with a modified frame to enable a lower riding position similar to the proven BSA profile, and using standard Laverda telescopic front forks. Other modifications were Laverda 750SFC swinging-arm with disc-brake mounting and shorter Girling suspension units, smaller alternator with smaller battery both repositioned behind the cylinder block and a secondary 'emergency' fuel tank in the original battery position. Laverda provided crank parts and camshafts. All work was carried out by Mike and Chris Tomkinson at Mike's home workshop, to avoid disruption to their core retail business.

== "Nessie" ==
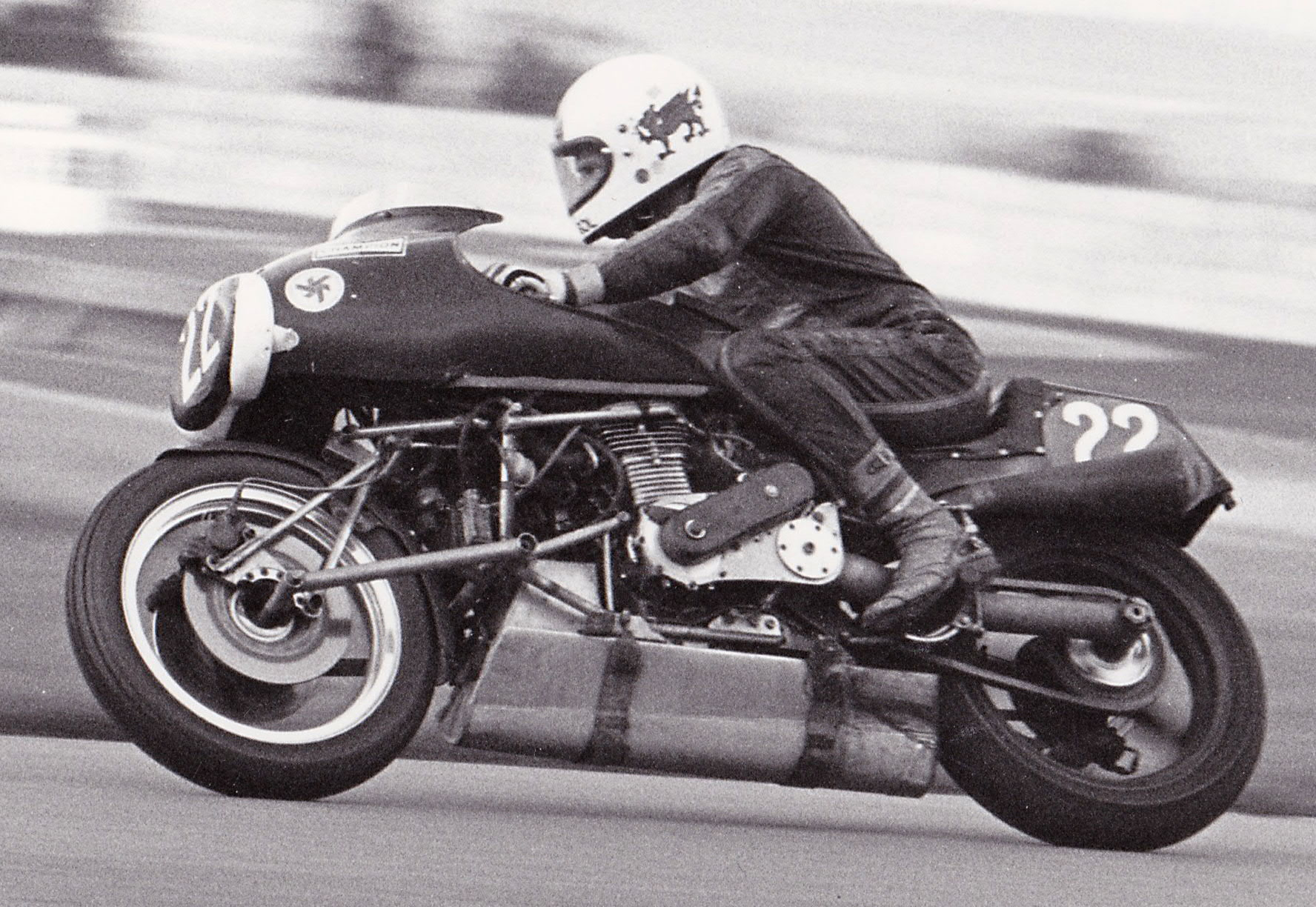
'Nessie', campaigned by Arthur Moloney and Roger Nicholls at a World Endurance Championship event at Donington Park in 1981. Note the enclosed belt-drive to the remote-mounted alternator moved from the crankshaft's end to behind the cylinders (to reduce cornering width).

Laverda Nessie, showing the early parallelogram rear suspension.

Mead & Tomkinson then came to fame in the mid-1970s with their specially designed endurance racer, nicknamed 'Nessie', (after the Loch Ness Monster because the bike was not a thing of beauty). The engines were conventional roadster engines, tuned for racing power. First they used a 1,000 cc Laverda Jota triple, and later a 1,000 cc Kawasaki four. Feeling that racing bike design was too conservative, the Tomkinsons gave Nessie a number of innovations:

- Whereas motorcycles conventionally have the (light) exhaust pipes below the engine and the (heavy) fuel tank above, Nessie reversed this order to lower the centre of gravity. An inverted triangle in cross-section, the fuel tank was underslung beneath the engine.
- Whilst most bikes have telescopic forks, Nessie used an adapted version of Difazio hub-center steering, whereby braking forces were directed to the frame via a pivoted fork (rather than through the steering head). This allowed neutral steering and an absence of brake dive.
- The rear suspension was a parallelogram arrangement, to provide stiffness without weight. This device was not entirely successful, possibly because of having so many rose-joint linkages, and the team reverted to a conventional swingarm.
- The rear suspension pivot (like the Hesketh V1000) was co-axial with the final drive sprocket to maintain constant chain tension. This feature meant that (i) a smaller drive chain could be used and (ii) the chain was less stressed and therefore less likely to break.
- Nessie had its ignition circuitry in a removable, quickly-detachable 'cassette', so that if it proved faulty, it could be unplugged and replaced with ease.

Thirty-five years later, some of these special features have been adopted by mainstream road and racing bikes, such as the ELF, but Nessie remains unique in having them all on a single machine.
