= Duplex steering =

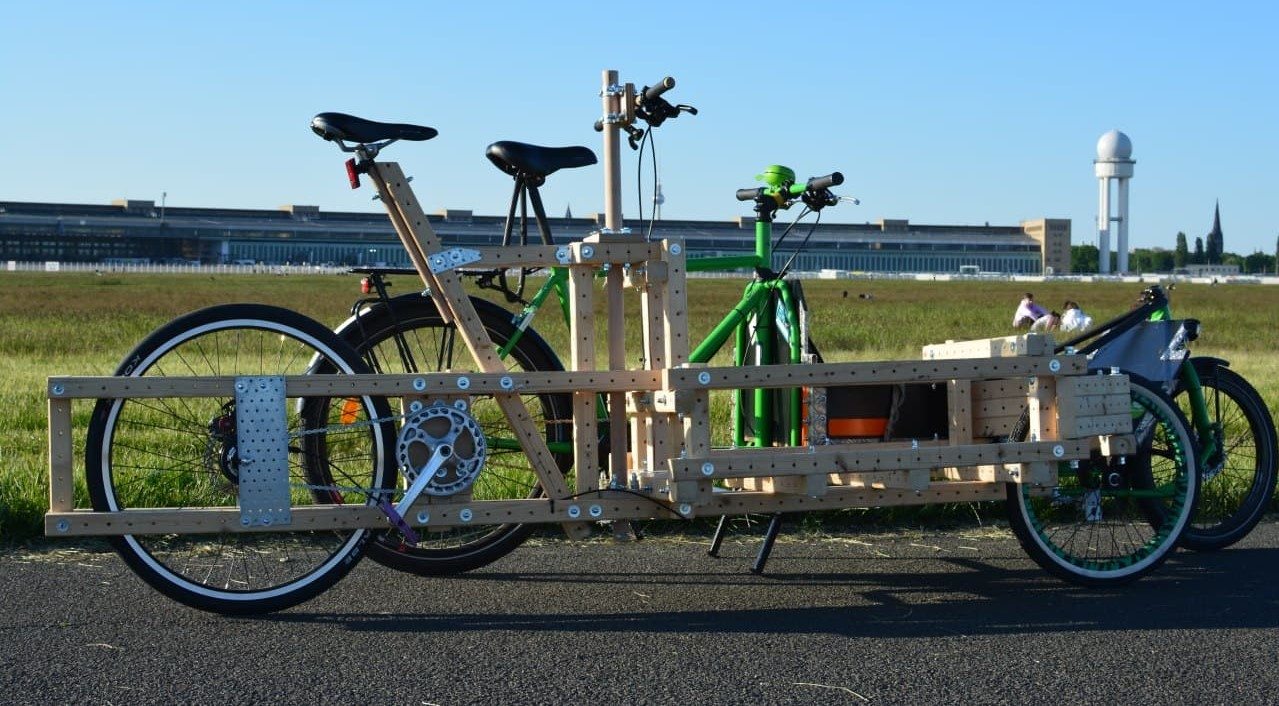
Gridbeam cargo bike with duplex steering

Duplex steering on a motorcycle from the Osborn Engineering Company (OEC)

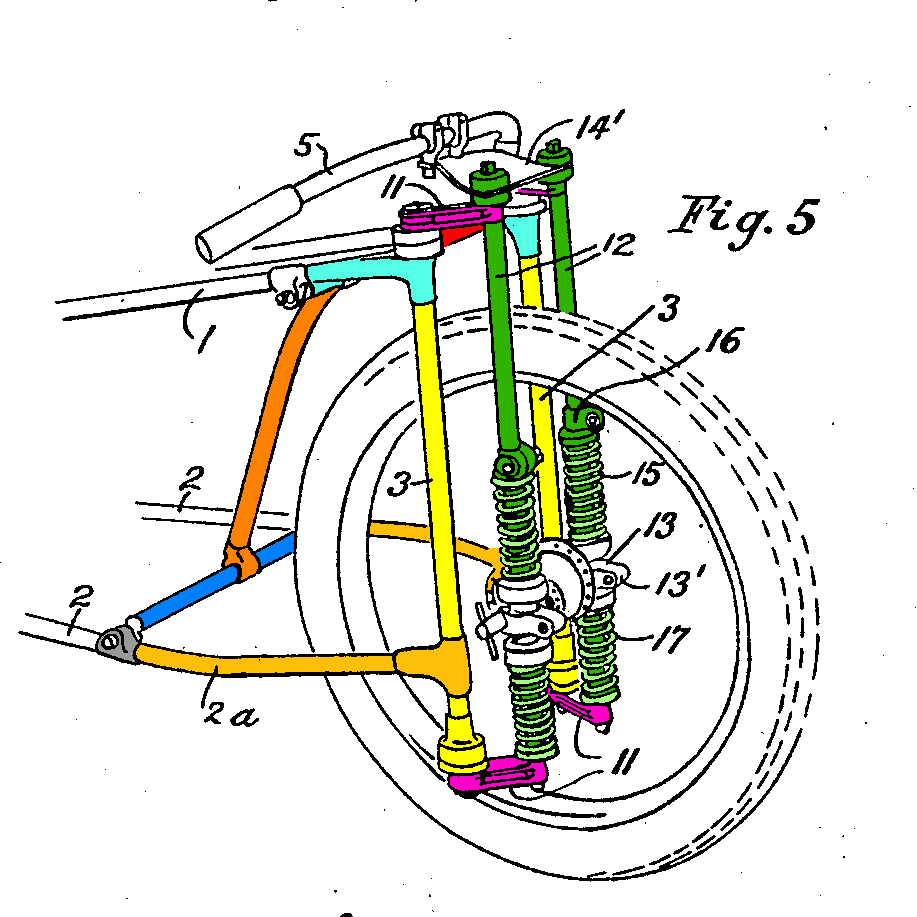
Drawing 5 from US Patent 1715246, showing the trapezoidal arms (11, purple) used for steering

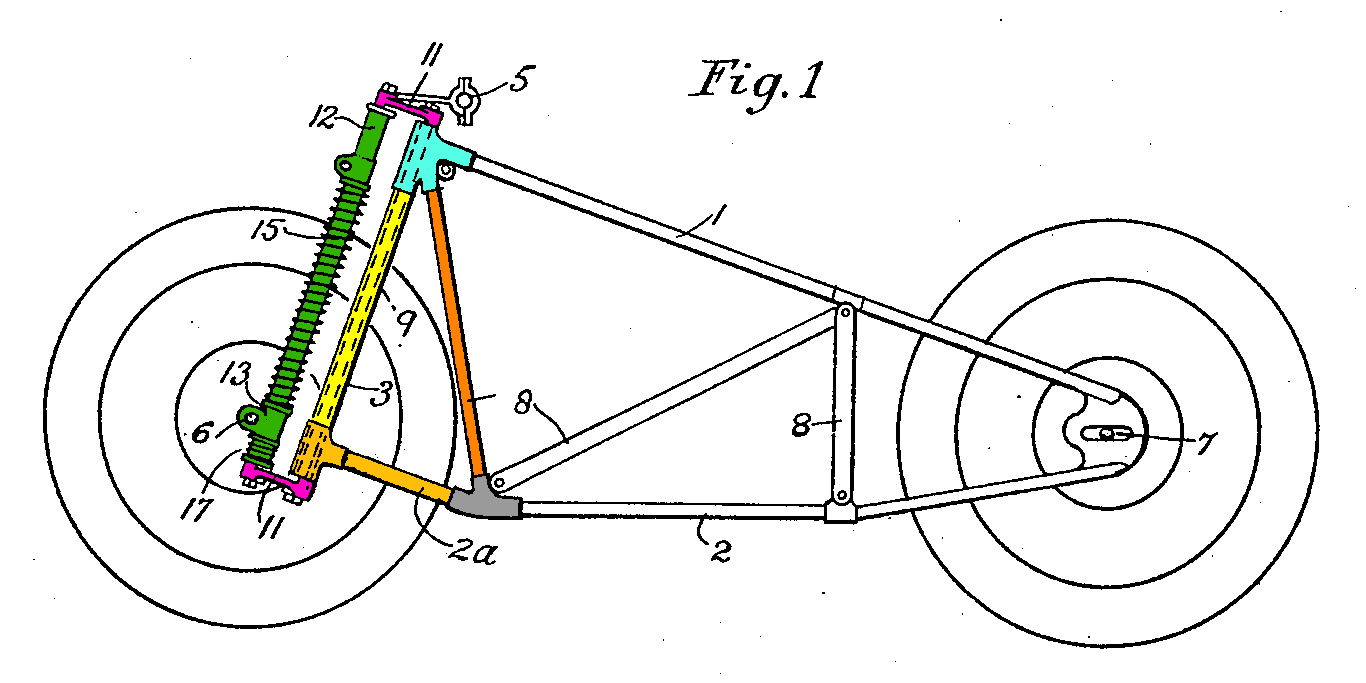
Drawing 3 from US Patent 1715246

Duplex steering is a type of steering/suspension system used on certain motorcycles and cargo bikes, consisting of pairs of control arms and joints that form a trapezoid. The geometry is reminiscent of Ackermann steering, but with only one wheel positioned between the linkages.

Compared to a conventional front fork, this allows for the separation of steering and suspension, ensuring that camber and caster angles are less affected during braking. Consequently, the suspension can become better equipped to handle irregularities in the road surface.

Duplex steering can contribute to "anti-dive" characteristics and improved stability, much like hub-center steering. Although sometimes confused with hub-center steering, duplex steering differs in that the steering mechanism operates outside the center of the wheel hub. An advantage over hub-center steering is that it allows for the use of conventional bicycle or motorcycle wheel hubs. Depending on the design, duplex steering may offer a limited steering range and turning radius, and it often consists of more components than a conventional front-fork steering system. It has been said that the duplex steering is very stable and prefers to self-straighten, being so stable that it is not particularly nimble for cornering. The design is susceptible to scrubbing.

== History ==
Duplex steering with two head tubes was patented in 1927 by the Osborn Engineering Company (OEC) in Gosport, England, and was used in the production of OEC motorcycles until the end of the 1930s.

On November 6, 1930, Joseph S. Wright set the motorcycle speed record in Cork, Ireland, reaching a speed of 242.590 km/h on an OEC motorcycle equipped with an engine from J. A. Prestwich Industries (JAP). The JAP-OEC motorcycle, featuring duplex steering, was presented as the record-breaking machine at the Olympia Show in London and subsequently entered into the official record books. It later emerged that Wright had brought two motorcycles to Ireland for the attempt: an OEC and a Zenith, both powered by identical 996cc V-twin engines from JAP, equipped with superchargers. However, the OEC (with its duplex steering) broke down on the track following the first run due to an engine failure; consequently, Wright used the Zenith (fitted with a girder fork) for the runs in both directions, thereby setting the record. It has been speculated that the engine supplier, JAP, attributed the record to a manufacturer whose production operations had not yet ceased at that time.

In modern times, duplex steering has been used on a number of front loader cargo bikes—though mostly limited to prototypes and low-volume production—possibly as a simpler alternative to hub-center steering (production bikes generally use a traditional fork). Examples include the Cargobike XYZ, Conta Cargobike, Retrovelo BonJohn, EsCargo, AsasarA Cargobikes prototype 02, Catan Cargobike, Veloader, and Rockwest Cargonnect Cargobike.

== See also ==
- Ackermann steering, a geometric configuration of vehicle steering designed to accommodate the different turning radii of inner and outer wheels during a turn
- Head tube, the part of a frame through which the front fork's steerer tube (fork column) passes
- Hub-center steering, a type of suspension and steering mechanism used in motorcycles and cargo bikes
- Telelever, a front suspension system in which the spring and damper units are relocated to triangular control arms
