= Osborn Engineering Company =

Osborn Engineering Company was a British manufacturer of motorcycles, which sold its machines under the OEC brand name.

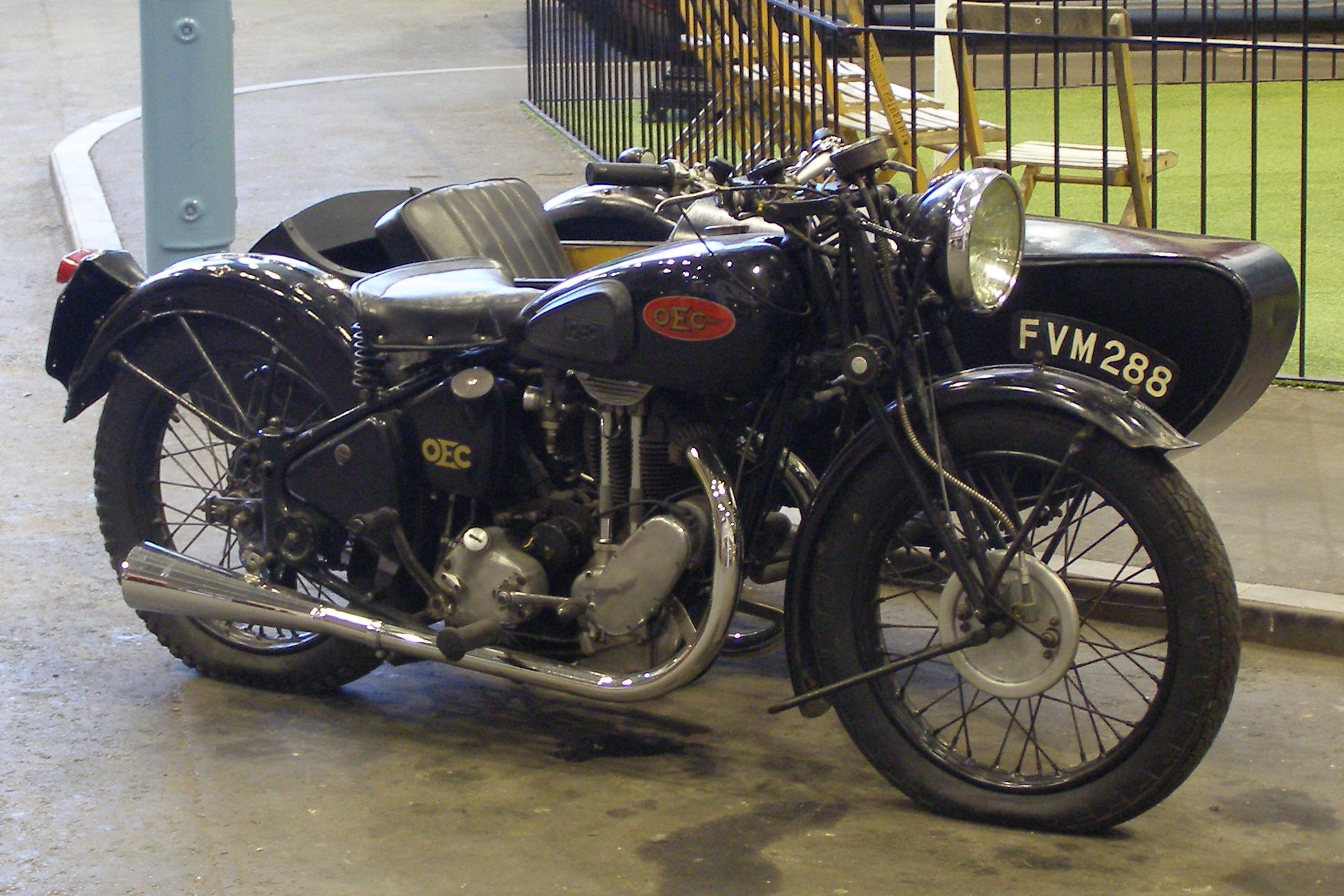
OEC motorcycle on display at the Milestones Museum

The Osborn Engineering Company and its predecessor companies were founded by Frederick John Osborn, trading in partnership with W.T. Lord until 1906 with works in Shepherd's Bush, then as Osborn & Co Ltd, and later as Osborn Engineering Company. In the 1920s they had a 2-acre factory at Lees Lane, Gosport, and were engaged in a wide range of engineering activities. They built motorcycles for Burney & Blackburne, then from 1922 produced them as OEC-Blackburne, then later just OEC. Initially they used Blackburne engines, but later used other engine manufacturers such as JAP. The Osborn Engineering Company went into receivership in 1931, and the extensive premises at Lees Lane, Gosport were auctioned by the receiver on 17 December 1931. However the motorcycle part of the business survived and by 1933 OEC motorcycles were being produced by O.E.C. Ltd of Portsmouth. During the Second World War, OEC ceased motorcycle production to concentrate on war work, but went back to motorcycle production before ceasing production in 1954.

== Osborn & Co ==
Osborn & Co Ltd was formed in 1906 when the partnership of Frederick John Osborn and William Thorburn Lord, agents and automobile engineers was dissolved. Osborn and Lord had been UK Agents for the Gregoire cars, and adverts of the time stated that you purchased the car and then had "bodies built by London coach-builders to your own design and colour". Osborn and Lord had their works adjoining the Empire Theatre at Shepherd's Bush. Osborn & Co Ltd continued as UK agents and exhibited the Gregoire car at the Olympia Motor Show from 1906 to 1909. The account of the 1908 Olympia show mentions that Osborn & Co were also involved with the Lynton resilient wheel and tyre.

During WW1 Osborn & Co were involved in supply of horse boxes to the RSPCA - these had Commer 3-ton chassis and Mulliner bodywork. Towards the end of WW1 F.J. Osborn patented a horse box designed to help transport injured horses (GB130774 8/8/1918), and in Dec 1918 the company advertised the Mulliner-Osborn de luxe horse box. The company address at that time was still 4 Great Marlborough Street, London.

In 1919 Osborn and Co Ltd acquired the former United AirCraft Ltd factory in Lees Lane, Gosport. In 1920 they advertised a diverse range of service from their 2-acre factory, including plating, enamelling, turning, milling, grinding, gear cutting, hardening, press work, sand blasting, smith's work and they claimed 20 years experience in automobile manufacture and also that they are the maker of the "Blackburne" motorcycle. In the advert they referred to themselves as Osborn & Co Ltd, Consulting Engineers (United Aircraft Co Ltd.) Lees Lane, Gosport.

In 1921 they advertised themselves as Electrical Engineering contractors, covering electric light, dynamos, motors, cinema plant, country house lighting installation and maintenance. Their Telegram name continued to be "Planes" Gosport. In March 1921 a similar advert stated they made the Blackburne Motorcycle, the Sirron Light Chassis, and Motor Bodies of all types for the Fiat Company.

== OEC Motorcycles ==
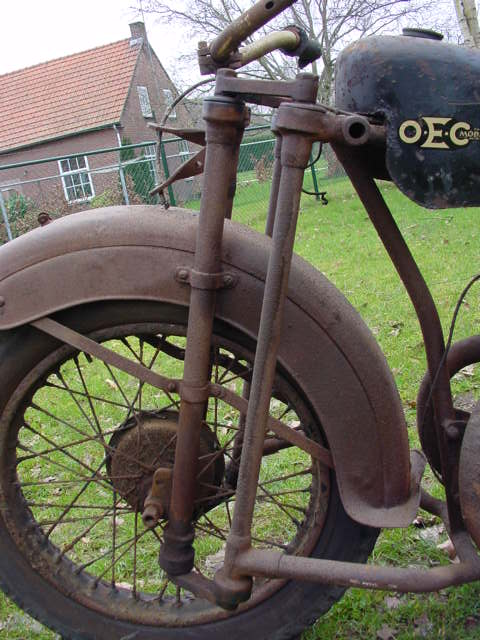
OEC Duplex Steering Spring Chassis 1934

While Osborn & Co advertise in early 1921, at the November 1921 Olympia Show the Blackburne motorcycles were shown by the Osborn Engineering Company Ltd. Among the motorcycles on the stand was the 1090cc Blackburne motorcycle with a luxury sidecar designed for use as a taxi-cab. This was a conventional motorcycle except in one striking aspect, it had a steering wheel instead of handlebars (with the steering wheel connected to the forks by worm and bevel gearing). In 1922 Burney & Blackburne Ltd ceased selling the Blackburne motorcycle, and instead focussed on engine sales. The Osborn Engineering Company - who had built the Blackburne motorcycles - took over the sales of the completed motorcycles marketing them as OEC-Blackburne, and later just OEC.

The OEC-Blackburne stand at the 1922 show exhibited the same sidecar with steering wheel as in 1921 but as the OEC-Blackburne Other OEC-Blackburne motorcycles on show in 1922 included a 349cc side-valve touring solo, a 348cc overhead-valve sports solo (also available with light sidecar), a 545cc single with sidecar, and 998cc V-twin sidecar models with either single and double seat sidecars.

In 1927 OEC introduced its first bike with unusual patented duplex steering front fork system (e.g. US Patent No 1715246 and 1780034), and this was to be fitted to all their models. The next year they patented a novel rear swinging arm suspension design (US Patent No 1816788). At the 1929 Olympia show Osborn Engineering Company listed 350cc and 500cc motorcycles, in either side-valve or overhead-valve form, all with the unusual duplex fork arrangement. However the novel design was not a success, and the Osborn Engineering Company went into receivership in 1931, and their huge factory in Gosport was sold by the receiver and became Ashley's wallpaper factory.

The motorcycle business was resurrected by a financial tie-up with dealers Glanfield and Lawrence in 1932, as O.E.C. Ltd of Atlanta Works, Highbury Street, Portsmouth, and in 1934 in addition to motorcycles it announced a very unusual vehicle - the two wheel car. This was the brainchild of Mr Norman Frederick Wood, designer and director - and was in effect a motorcycle enclosed completely in a slender car type body with wheel steering, and tandem seating for two. By 1935 this unusual vehicle was being marketed as the Whitwood monocar, however it was not a success and was discontinued in 1936.

The most famous model produced by the firm was the OEC Commander introduced in 1938, with a 500 cc single-cylinder Matchless engine, Girling brakes, sprung frame and duplex steering plus a claimed top speed of 80 mph.

During WW2 the works changed over to manufacturing aircraft undercarriage parts, however it was also involved with the rather strange and unsuccessful secret weapon known as the Great Panjandrum which will be familiar to devotees of "Dad's Army" as an imitation of it featured in an episode in 1972. The works was bombed during the war and when production restarted it was at Stamshaw Road, Portsmouth.

In 1949 the company commenced production of the Atlanta, a lightweight machine with a choice of 122 cc or 197 cc Villiers engines, followed in 1951 by the Apollo, with a 248 cc side-valve Brockhouse engine. Neither of these postwar machines was successful and the company ceased production in 1954.

== Speed Record ==
In the 1920s and 1930s there were numerous attempts at gaining the motorcycle speed record by various companies, and OEC was one of them. Their first success came about by teaming up with Claude Temple, who used the unusual OEC fork arrangement which had the virtue of great straight line stability (only a virtue if you want to go in a straight line!). Using a 996cc JAP engine in the OEC frame he gained the world speed record at Arpajon in France in 1926 at 121.44 mph. The record stood until August 1928 when it was taken by a Brough Superior.

On 31 August 1930 a motorcycle with a special OEC frame - the OEC-Temple-JAP - ridden by Joe Wright gained the world speed record at Arpajon, France, at 137.32 mph. Less than a month later the record was taken by Ernst Henne on a supercharged BMW to 137.85 mph (221.85 km/h) at Ingolstadt, Germany.

OEC and Joe Wright set to regain the record in Cork in November 1930, and while the record was broken at 150.7 mph on 6 November, and the OEC-Temple-JAP was exhibited as the record-breaker at the Olympia show - the truth turned out to be that the OEC developed an engine problem, and the record breaking ride was on a backup Zenith-JAP motorcycle. The Zenith company being in financial difficulties, and OEC paying for the record attempt, the facts got mis-reported. The truth did however come out fairly soon after the Olympia show.
