= Hub-center steering =

Steering mechanism for motorcycles

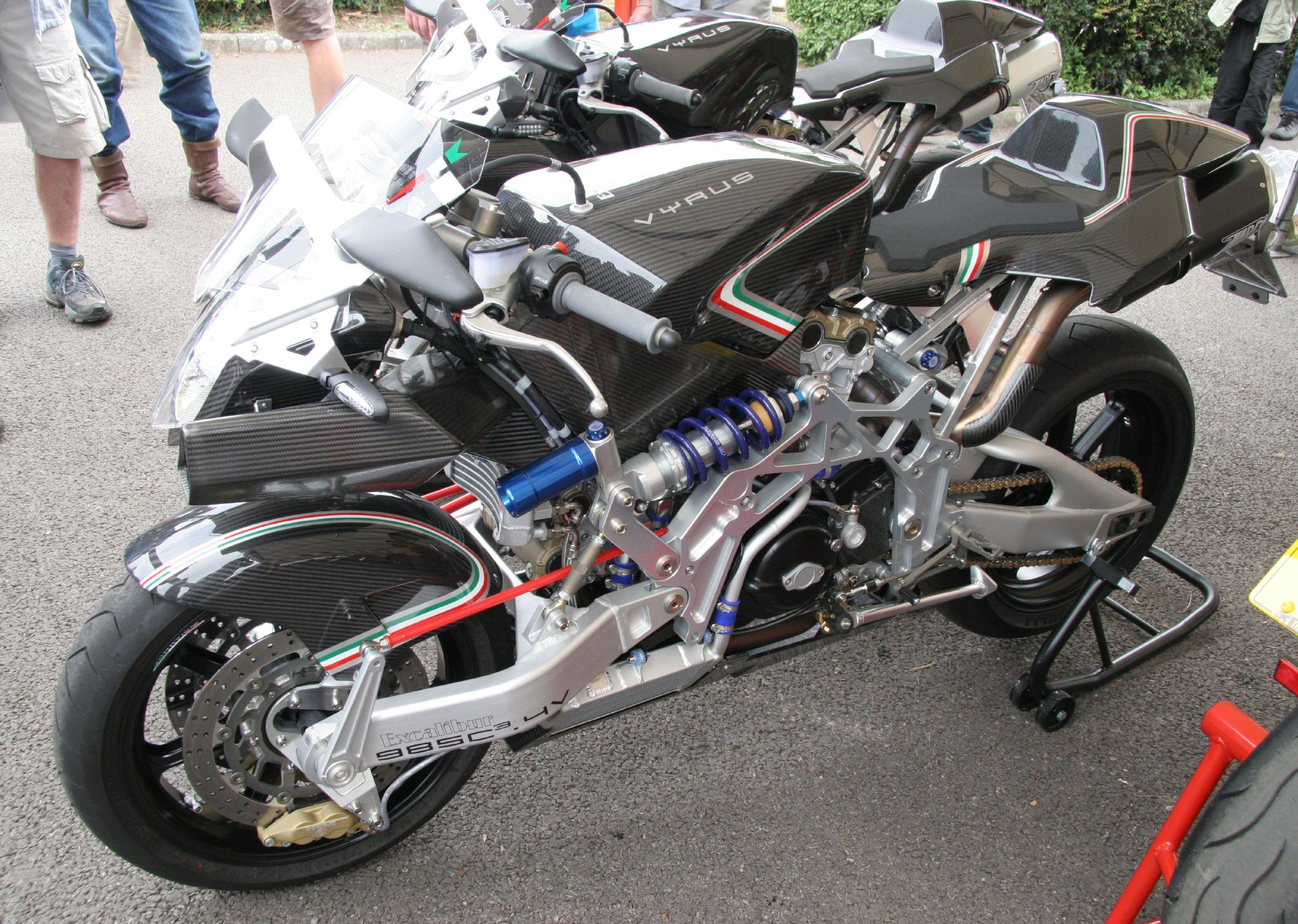
The Vyrus 985 C3, an exclusive Italian motorcycle with hub-center steering, of which 24 were sold between 2004-2008

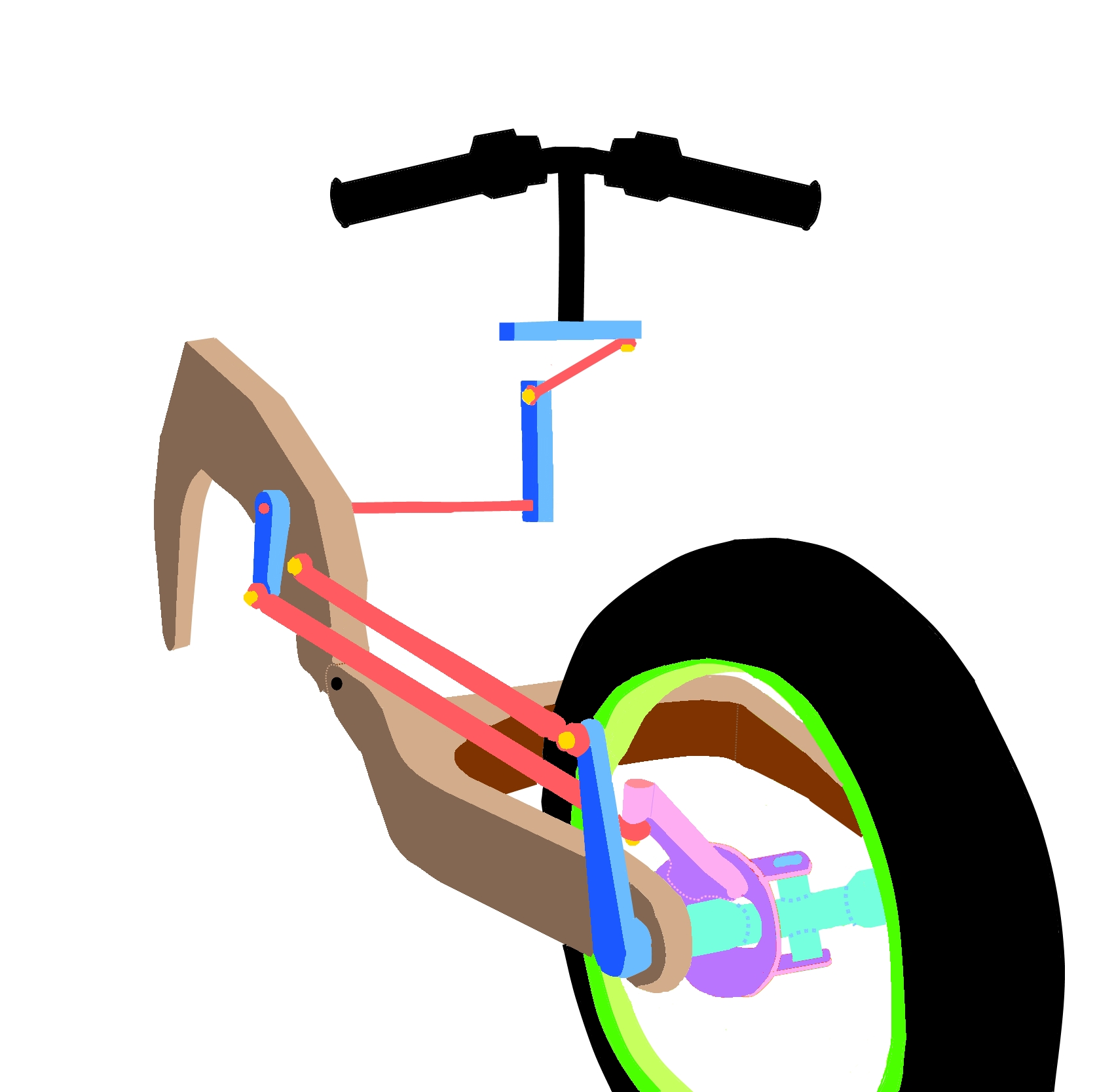
Hub-center steering in Bimota Tesi 1/D

Hub-center steering (HCS) is one of several different types of front-end suspension/steering mechanisms used in motorcycles and cargo bicycles. Hub-center steering is characterized by the steering pivot points being inside the hub of the wheel, rather than above the wheel in the headstock as in the traditional layout. Most hub-center arrangements employ a swingarm that extends from the bottom of the engine/frame to the center of the front wheel, but there are also hydraulic and cable-actuated versions.

Hub steering mechanisms are complex and have a number of theoretical advantages, but in practice may provide an inconsistent driving feel due to slack arising from the complex linkages. Although conventional forks have a number of theoretical weaknesses, they are, on the other hand, a more developed and mature system.

== Separation of steering, braking and damping ==
The advantages of using a hub-center steering system instead of a more conventional motorcycle fork are that hub-center steering separates the steering, braking, and suspension functions.

=== Elimination of stiction in dampers ===
With a fork the braking forces are put through the suspension, a situation that leads to the suspension being compressed, using up a large amount of suspension travel which makes dealing with bumps and other road irregularities extremely difficult. As the forks dive, the steering geometry of the bike also changes, making the bike more nervous, and inversely, acceleration becomes more lazy. Also, having the steering working through the forks causes problems with stiction, decreasing the effectiveness of the suspension.

Hub-center steering systems use an arm, or arms, on bearings to allow upward wheel deflection, meaning that there is no stiction, even under braking. Braking forces can be redirected horizontally along these arms, or tie rods, away from the vertical suspension forces, and can even be put to good use to counteract weight transfer.

=== Reduced mass ===
The length of the typical motorcycle fork means that they act as large levers about the headstock requiring the forks, the headstock, and the frame to be very robust adding to the bike's weight.

=== Consistent but complex behavior ===
The arms typically form some form of parallelogram which maintains steering geometry over the full range of wheel travel, allowing agility and consistency of steering that forks currently cannot get close to attaining.

The hub center steering's Achilles heel, however, has been the steering feel. Complex linkages tend to be involved in the steering process, and this can lead to slack, vague, or inconsistent handlebar movement across its range. After many years of telescopic forks, people are used to riding a bike that handles in a specific way, and almost expect the limitations, and compensation is part of the experience. Also, there is a depth of knowledge known about fork-based chassis design that attempts each year to get around the limitations through technological advances on the current system. Thicker and thicker fork tubes are used to reduce flex, special coatings are used to mitigate stiction, and greater and greater steering angles are used to counteract dive.

== History ==
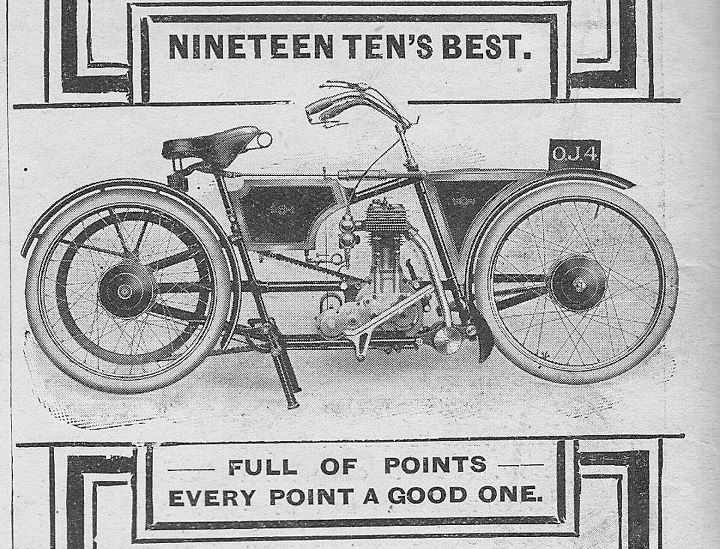
1910 "New Pattern' James with hub-center steering

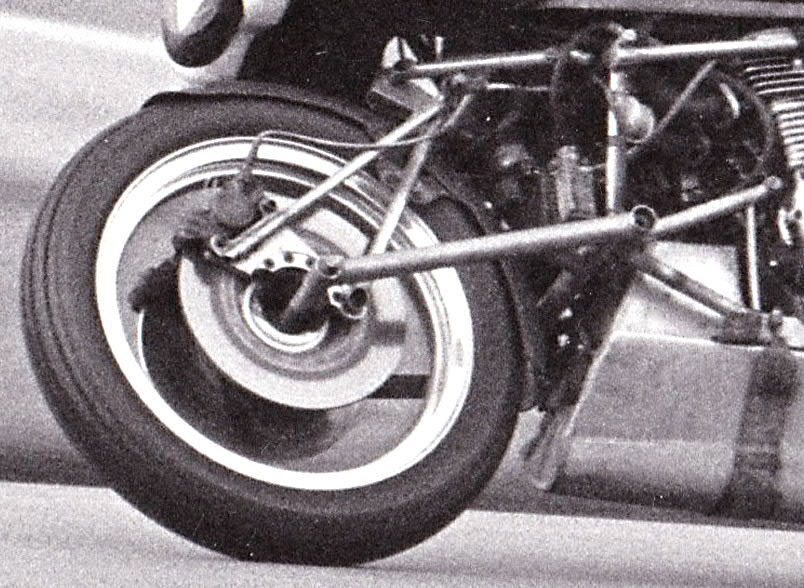
Detail of mechanism on the Mead & Tomkinson Kawasaki 'Nessie'

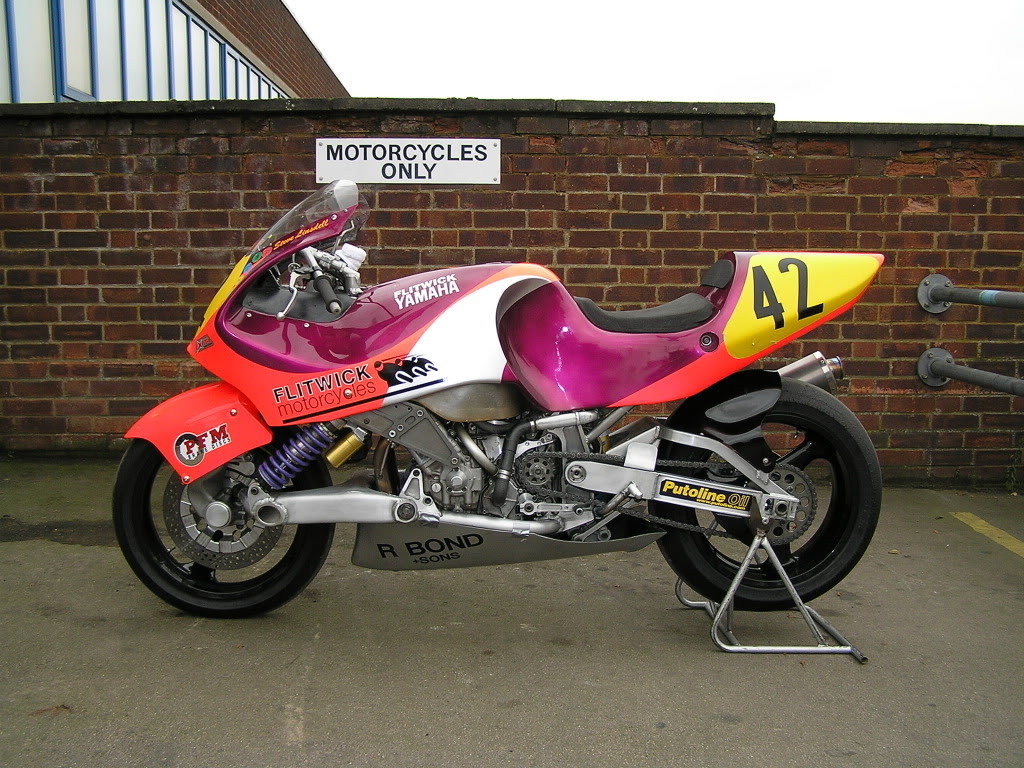
Steven Linsdell's Yamaha GTS Isle of Man TT racing motorcycle

The hub-center steer concept is a very old one used as early as 1910 by the British James Cycle Co, and in 1920 by Ner-a-Car, and enjoyed an aftermarket vogue in the 1970s through the work of Jack Difazio in the UK.

Mead & Tomkinson Racing pioneered the use of hub-center steering in long-distance motorcycle endurance racing. Their first version of "Nessie" was powered by a modified Laverda 3C 1000 cc triple cylinder, but they later designed a Kawasaki-engined bike that became known as Nessie II. In the 1980s, Tomkinson's efforts encouraged the Elf racing team to create a succession of endurance and GP race bikes.

In the 1990s there was a flurry of action, first was the Bimota Tesi 1D in 1991 however this was expensive and was only ever produced in small numbers. Then in 1993 Yamaha launched the GTS1000 based on James Parker's RADD design. It raced at the Isle of Man TT but was always blighted with a reputation for being a bit heavy and clumsy in use. However, Steven Linsdell changed this reputation slightly with an 8th place finish in the 1994 Formula One TT, 6th place in the 1995 Formula one TT, and 10th place in 1996 on his Flitwick Motorcycles machine, with very competitive times against factory machines from the likes of Honda and their RC45. His prototype, based on a heavily modified Yamaha GTS1000, featured a Yamaha YZF750 engine due to the Formula one regulations and achieved 178mph through the Sulby speedtrap section of the course. His average speed of over 117mph on the twisty and undulating 37.73 mile long hedge and wall-lined street course was very reputable at an international event, on a machine built in his garden workshop during his spare time away from work. Michael Tryphonos also built a prototype based on the Difazio system that did race at the Isle of Man with some success reaching 11th in the Senior TT.

Royce Creasey, the designer of feet forwards motorcycles, is an ardent advocate of hub-center steering.

Currently Bimota's Tesi 3D, the Vyrus 984 C3 2V and the 985 C3 4V are the only production motorcycles using hub-center steering systems. Italjet uses hub-center steering on their top-of-the-range scooters. Sidecar manufacturers occasionally employ hub-center steering in their designs, such as the GG Duetto. An aftermarket hub center steering assembly is made by ISR Brakes of Sweden.

== Production motorcycles ==
Production motorcycles that feature hub-center steering include:

- Arc Vector
- Bimota Tesi 1D, 2D, and 3D
- Johammer J1
- Majestic 1930
- Vyrus 984, 985, 986, and 987
- Yamaha GTS1000
- Italjet Dragster

== Use on bicycles ==
Cargo bicycles with the cargo platform ahead of the rider have a low-set platform with a small diameter front wheel ahead of this. The conventional fork and steerer rise above this, often inconveniently for cargo loading. In 2011 Elian Cycles developed their cargo bicycle called "Cargobike" with hub-center steering to the wheel.

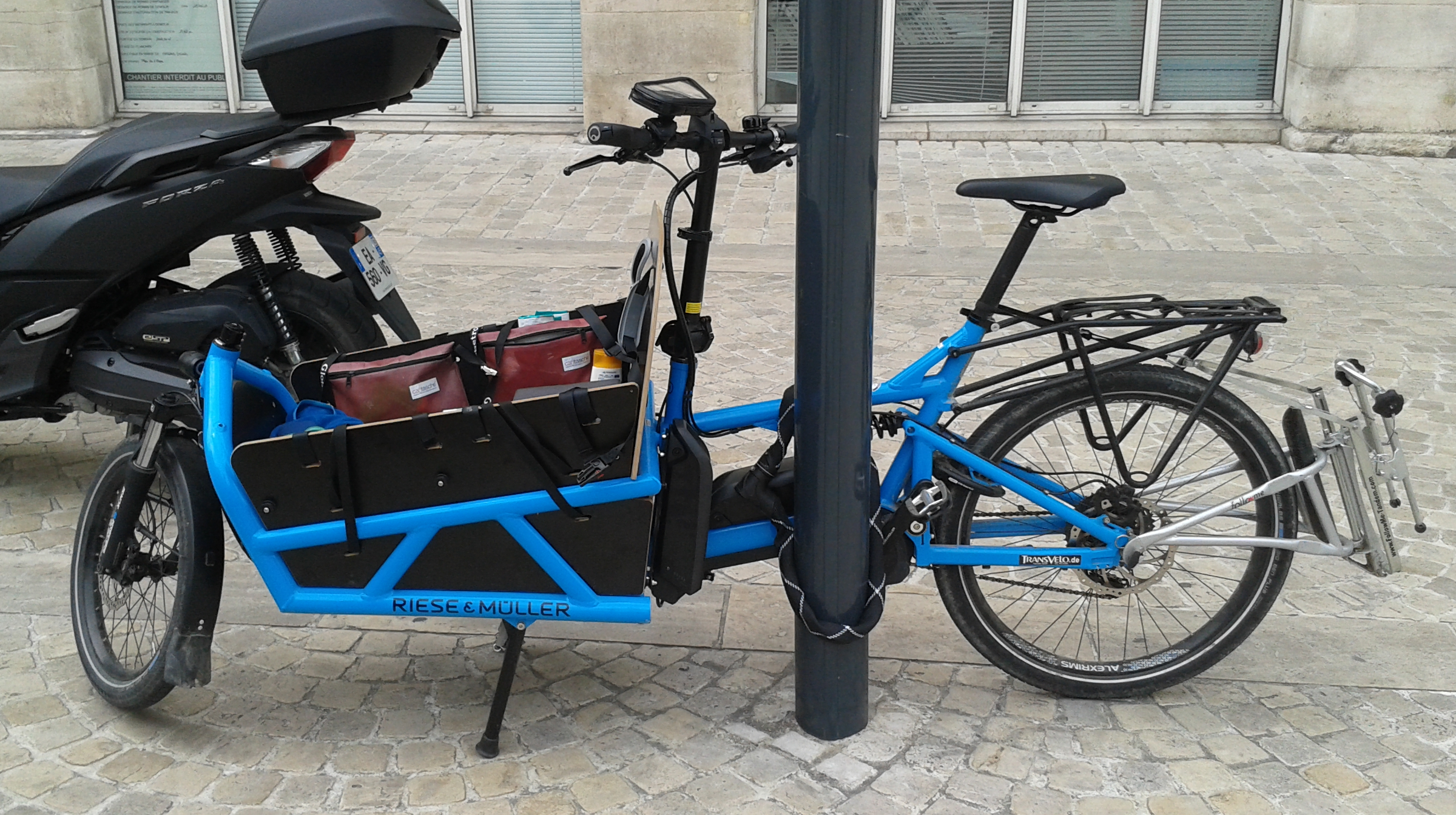
Modern fork-steered long john e-cargo bike (2018)

Kettler cargo bike with hub-center steering

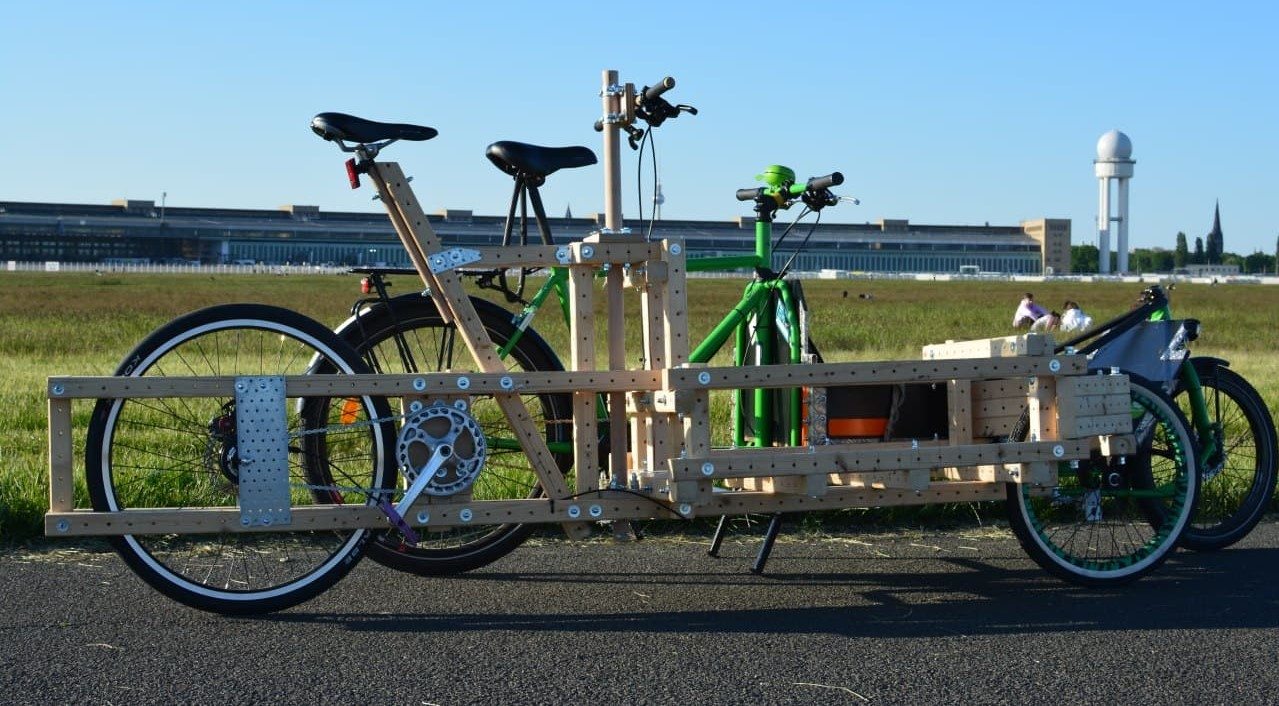
Gridbeam cargo bike with duplex steering

Bastiaen cargo bike with steering knuckle

== See also ==
- Duplex steering, suspension system consisting of pairs of control arms and joints that form a trapezoid
- Steering knuckle, another forkless steering system containing turnable spindle to steer a hub
- Wheel hub motor, motor in the middle of a wheel
