= Vyrus =

Italian motorcycle manufacturer

Vyrus Divisione Motori Srl
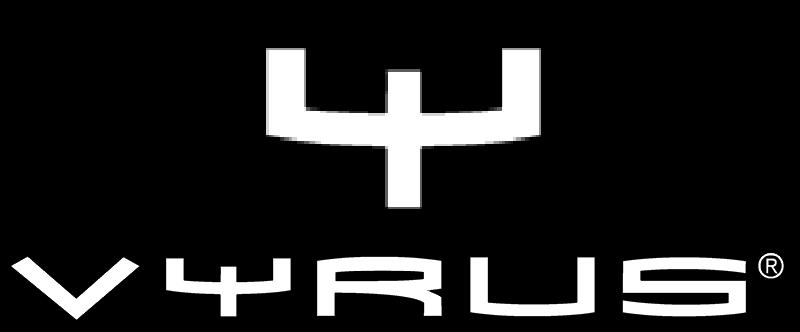
- Vyrus Logo
- Type: Private
- Industry: Motorcycle manufacturing
- Founded: 2001; 25 years ago
- Headquarters: Coriano, Italy
- Area served: Worldwide
- Key people: Ascanio Rodorigo
- Website: vyrus.it

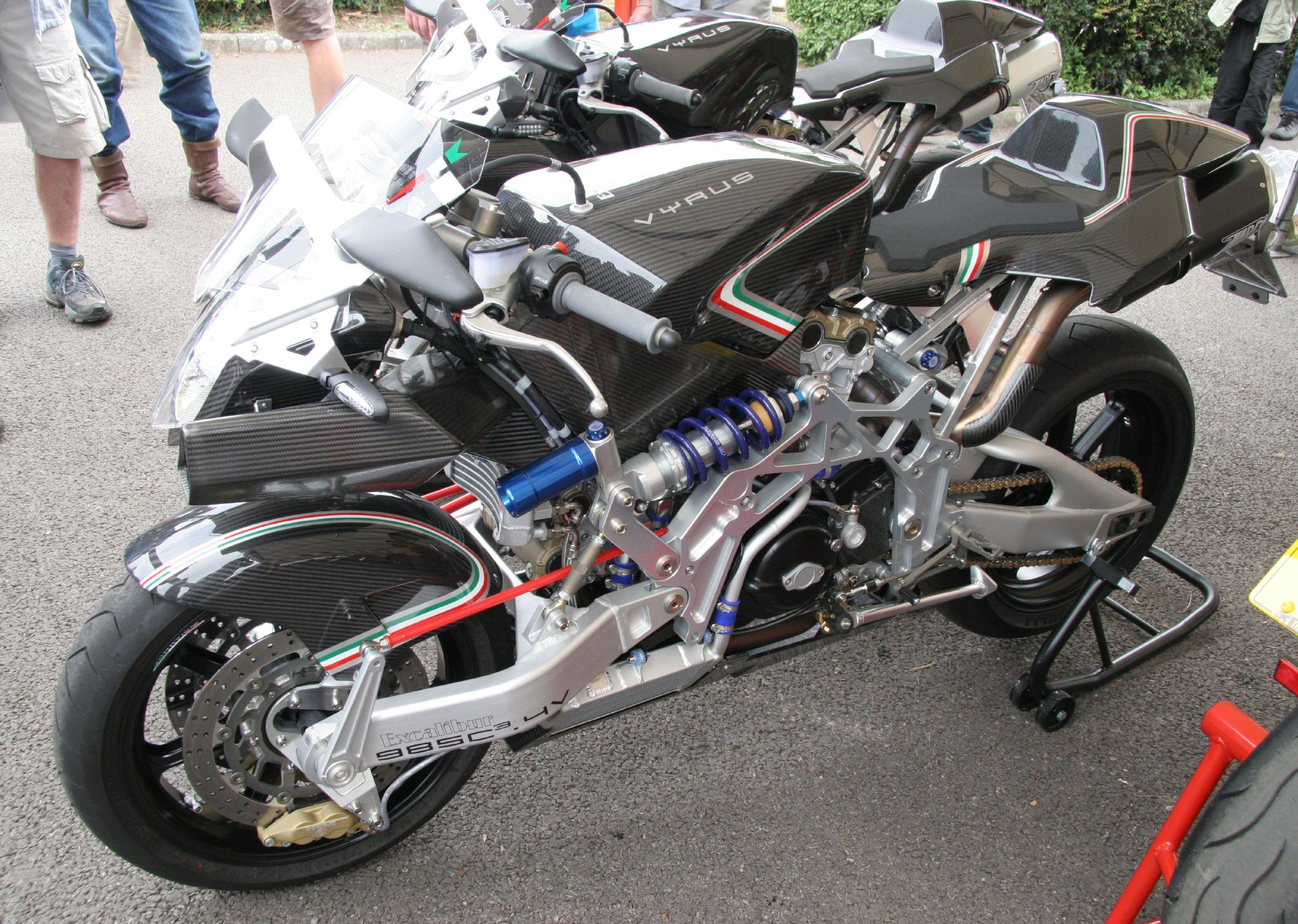
Vyrus 985 C3

Vyrus is a small, exclusivist Italian motorcycle manufacturer based in Coriano, Italy.

Vyrus initially worked alongside Bimota on the evolutionary development of Bimota's "Tesi" motorcycle. The "Tesi", meaning Thesis in Italian, had its origins as a university engineering project linked to Massimo Tamburini. The Tesi design was easily distinguished by the use of its hub-center steering front suspension arrangement. Vyrus split from the Bimota and completed the first evolution of the Tesi's development, marketing the bike under their own name.

== Production range ==
Vyrus is very much a "bespoke" manufacturer - individual bikes are built to order, with no two bikes being the same. Due to the limited production and use of high-quality parts, all Vyrus models are expensive, with the cheapest models starting from US$60,000.

Vyrus has produced models including: 984 C3 2V (Ducati-sourced 2-valve 1000 cm^{3} air-cooled engine developing 100bhp), 985 C3 4V (Ducati-sourced 4-valve 1000 cm^{3} water-cooled engine developing 155bhp), 987 C3 4V (Ducati-sourced 4-valve 1200 cm^{3} water cooled engine developing 184bhp) and the 987 C3 4VV (Ducati-sourced 4-valve 1200 cm^{3} supercharged water cooled engine developing 211bhp), and the Vyrus Alyen.

== 2011 MotoGP prototype ==
In 2011 Vyrus showed interest in the new Moto2 category by designing a new bike around the series-spec Honda CBR600RR engine used in the class. The hub-centre front steering was used, with a new frame as well. Three versions were offered – a race-ready model with top spec components for a little under US$90,000, a street legal variant for around US$40,000 and a kit without engine around US$27,000. Unfortunately there were no takers for the venture and Vyrus sold off the prototypes in 2012.

== MiniVirus 07 EV ==
The MiniVirus was a pocketbike powered by a two-stroke 40cc engine and again using the hub-centre front steering system. Like the full-size bikes, the MiniVirus was expensive, costing over US$5,000. Few were made.

== See also ==
- Motorcycle
- List of Italian companies
- List of motorcycle manufacturers
- List of motorcycles by type of engine
