= Motorcycle suspension =

Part of a motorcycle

A motorcycle's suspension serves a dual purpose: contributing to the vehicle's handling and braking, and providing safety and comfort by keeping the vehicle's passengers comfortably isolated from road noise, bumps and vibrations.

The typical motorcycle has a pair of fork tubes for the front suspension, and a swingarm with one or two shock absorbers for the rear suspension.

== Front suspension ==
The most common form of front suspension for a modern motorcycle is the telescopic fork. Other fork designs are girder forks, suspended on sprung parallel links (not common since the 1940s) and bottom leading link designs, not common since the 1960s.

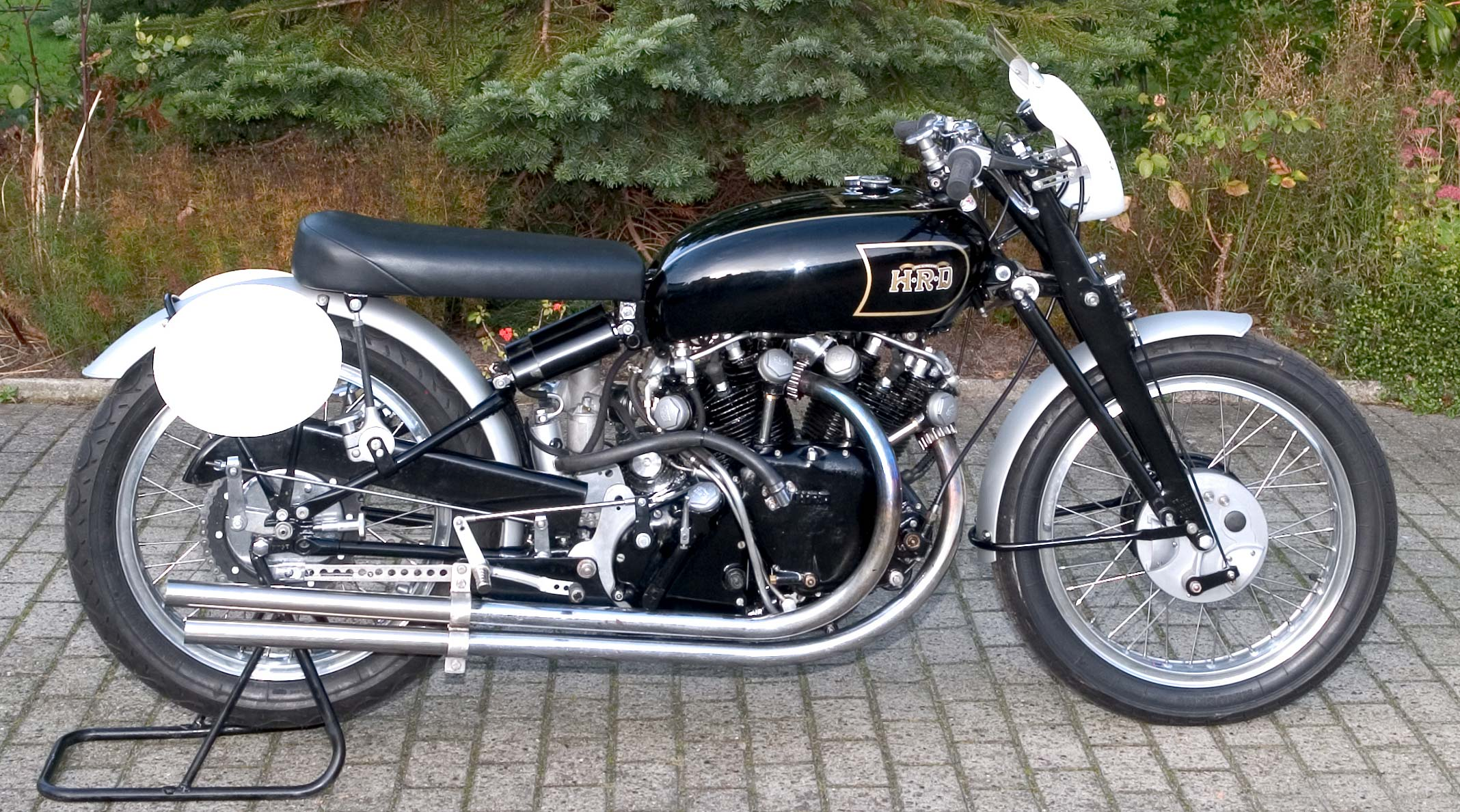
Vincent Black Lightning with Girdraulic front suspension

Some manufacturers (e.g. Greeves) used a version of the swinging arm for front suspension on their motocross designs. A single-sided version of the idea is also used in motor scooters such as the Vespa.

The hub-center steering as developed by Ascanio Rodorigo, on a concept associated to Massimo Tamburini is a complex front swingarm alternative system that entails suspension and steering, as seen in projects such as the Bimota Tesi, and Vyrus motorcycles.

=== Telescopic forks ===
Scott produced a motorcycle with telescopic forks in 1908, and would continue to use them on some models until 1931. In 1935 BMW became the first manufacturer to produce a motorcycle with hydraulically damped telescopic forks, although the Danish Nimbus company had un-damped telescopic forks in production in 1934. Most motorcycles today use telescopic forks for the front suspension. The forks can most easily be understood as simply encased long coil springs with hydraulic damping of excess spring energy. They allow the front wheel to react to imperfections in the road while isolating the rest of the motorcycle from that motion.

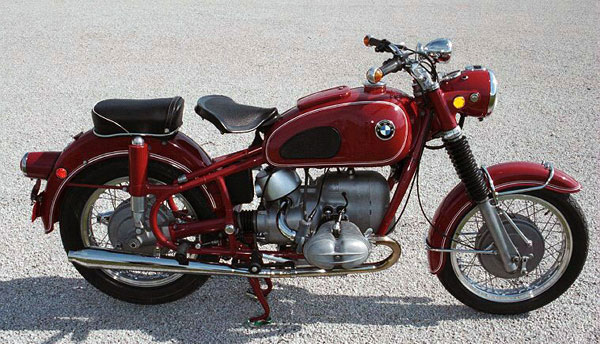
Telescopic forks on a 1969 BMW

The top of the forks are connected to the motorcycle's frame in a triple tree clamp (known as a "yoke" in the UK), which allows the forks to be turned in order to steer the motorcycle. The bottom of the forks carries the front wheel's axle.

On conventional telescopic forks, the lower portion or fork bodies ("fork sliders" in the UK), slide up and down the fork tubes ("fork stanchions" in the UK). The fork tubes must be mirror-smooth to seal the fork oil inside the fork. Some fork tubes, especially on early roadsters and off-road motorcycles, are enclosed in concertina plastic/rubber protective "gaiters".

"Upside-down" (USD) forks, also known as inverted forks, are installed inverted compared with conventional telescopic forks. The slider bodies are at the top, fixed in the triple clamps, and the stanchion tubes are at the bottom, fixed to the axle. This USD arrangement has two advantages: (i) it decreases the unsprung weight of the motorcycle; and (ii) it increases torsional stiffness, which can improve handling. Two disadvantages of USD forks are: (i) they are more expensive than conventional telescopic forks; and (ii) they are liable to lose all their damping oil should an oil seal fail. USD forks are typically found on sportbikes, though the Honda Valkyrie featured USD forks.

==== Pre-load adjustment ====
Motorcycle suspensions are designed so that the springs are always under compression, even when fully extended. Pre-load is used to adjust the initial position of the suspension with the weight of the motorcycle and rider acting on it.

The difference between the fully extended length of the suspension and the length compressed by the weight of the motorcycle and rider is called "total sag" or "race sag". Total sag is set to optimize the initial position of the suspension to avoid bottoming out or topping out under normal riding conditions. "Bottoming out" occurs when the suspension is compressed to the point where it mechanically cannot compress any more. Topping out occurs when the suspension extends fully and cannot mechanically extend any more. Increasing pre-load increases the initial force on the spring thereby reducing total sag. Decreasing pre-load decreases the initial force in the spring thereby increasing total sag.

Some motorcycles allow adjustment of pre-load by changing the air pressure inside the forks. Valves at the top of the forks allow air to be added or released from the fork. More air pressure gives more pre-load, and vice versa.

==== Fork damping ====
Basic fork designs use a simple damper-rod system, in which damping is controlled by the passage of fork oil through an orifice. Though cheap to manufacture, it is hard to tune such forks, as they tend to give too little damping at low slider speeds, yet too much damping at higher slider speeds. Any adjustment setting will always be a compromise, giving both over-mushy and over-stiff damping. Since forks act as hydraulic dampers, changing the weight of the fork oil will alter the damping rate. Some telescopic forks have external adjustments for damping.

A more sophisticated approach is the cartridge fork, which use internal cartridges with a valving system. Damping at low slider speeds is controlled by a much smaller orifice, but damping at higher slider speeds is controlled by a system of flexible shims, which act as a bypass valve for the fork oil. This valve has a number of such shims of varying thicknesses that cover and flex to meter the orifices in the valve to control the damping of the fork during high speed slider movement on high and medium size bumps.

Some of the shims (or "leaf springs") lift with little force allowing fluid to flow through the orifice. Other springs require greater force to lift and allow flow. This gives the fork digressive damping, allowing it to be stiff over small bumps, yet relatively softer over larger bumps. Also, the springs (or shims) only allow flow in one direction, so one set of springs controls compression damping, and another rebound damping. This allows the dampings to be set separately.

Cartridge emulators are aftermarket parts that make damper-rod forks behave virtually as cartridge forks. The damping orifice in the damper-rod is made so large that it has virtually no effect on damping, and instead an "emulator" takes over the damping function. The emulator has a very small orifice for low fork-speed damping, and an adjustable shim-stack for high fork-speed damping.

Gas-charged cartridge forks, which became available in 2007, consist of gas-charged cartridges fitted within standard forks. This kit is suitable for supersport classes of racing, where regulations prohibit a complete fork replacement but allow modification of the original forks.

==== Brake dive ====
Applying the brakes of a moving motorcycle increases the load borne by the front wheel and decrease the load borne by the rear wheel due to a phenomenon called load transfer. For a detailed explanation and a sample calculation, see the braking section of the Bicycle and motorcycle dynamics article.

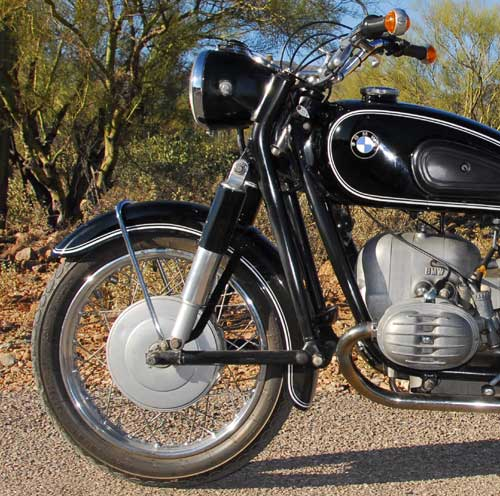
BMW's 1955-1969 Earles fork eliminated and reversed brake dive

If the motorcycle is equipped with telescopic forks, the added load on the front wheel is transmitted through the forks, which compress. This shortening of the forks causes the front end of the bike to move lower, and this is called brake dive. Telescopic forks are particularly prone to this, unlike leading link designs.

Brake dive can be disconcerting to the rider, who may feel like he or she is about to be thrown over the front of the motorcycle. If the bike dives so far as to bottom out the front forks, it can also cause handling and braking problems. One of the purposes of a suspension is to help maintain contact between the tire and road. If the suspension has bottomed out, it is no longer moving as it should, and is no longer helping to maintain contact.

While excessive brake dive is disconcerting, and bottoming out can cause loss of traction, a certain amount of brake dive reduces the rake and trail of the motorcycle, allowing it to turn more easily. This is especially important to racers trail braking on entrance to corners.

Brake dive with telescopic forks can be reduced by either increasing the spring rate of the fork springs, or increasing the compression damping of the forks. However, all of these changes make the motorcycle less pleasant to ride on rough roads, since the front end will feel stiffer, in the 1980s various manufacturers attempted to get round this by methods of anti-dive such as:

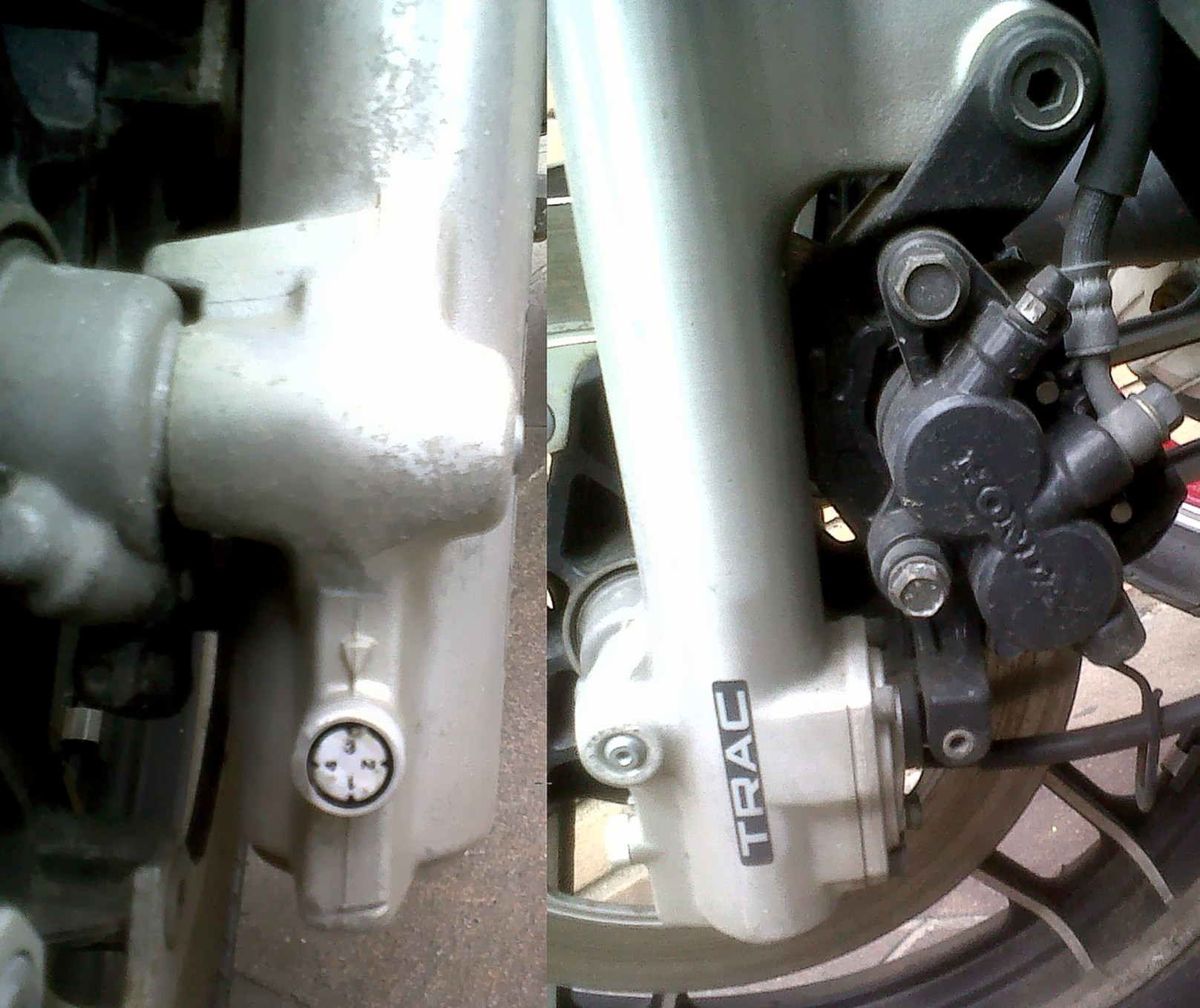
Honda TRAC

- ACT: Developed by Marzocchi and fitted to Buell motorcycles such as the Buell RR 1200 (1988).
- ANDF (Anti Nose Dive Forks): This was fitted to a number of Suzuki GSX models and the RG250.
- AVDS (Automatic Variable Damping System): This was fitted to a number of Kawasaki motorcycles.
- NEAS (New Electrically Activated Suspension): As fitted to the Suzuki GSX-R 1100 and GSX-R 750 Limited Edition.
- PDF (Posi Damp Fork): This was fitted to the Suzuki RG500, the GSX1100E/GS1150E and GSX-R 750 and was an enhancement of the previous Anti Dive units (which works by brake fluid pressure closing a valve in the mechanism when the brakes are applied, restricting the flow of damping oil and slowing fork compression). The PDF units works in a similar way, except that they rely entirely on the compression stroke itself. The valves are spring-loaded so if the wheel hits a bump, they bounce off their seats and restore the flow of oil for a moment to allow the suspension to absorb the shock.
- TCS (Travel Control System): Anti-dive system with variable damping. TCS was introduced on the FZ 400 R (1984, only for the Japanese market).
- TRAC (Torque Reactive Anti-dive Control): Developed by Honda, this is a simple mechanical system which is completely contained in the front suspension. The front brake caliper is mounted on a hinge, and uses the torque created in the braking action to operate a valve in the fork, which inhibits the flow of oil during braking. This system was fitted to a number of motorcycles, most notably the Goldwing series from 1983 through 2000, the Pacific Coast, CB1100F, CB1000C, and VFR750F.

With the advent of cartridge forks, which allow more low speed damping and less high speed damping than the previous damping rod forks, separate anti-dive mechanisms have generally fallen out of use.

Another method to reduce or eliminate brake dive in telescopic forks is to use a reactive link or torque arm to connect the braking components to the motorcycle frame via the triple clamp.

Some fork designs mitigate dive, eliminate it, or even reverse it without affecting the front suspension adversely. The Earles fork is among the latter; when braking the front brake hard, the front end of the motorcycle actually rises. BMW's Telelever fork is designed to nearly eliminate dive, and could have been designed to eliminate it completely if the manufacturer chose to do so. Leading link front forks, such as used on some Ural motorcycles, can also be designed either to reduce or eliminate dive.

==== Saxon-Motodd (Telelever) fork ====
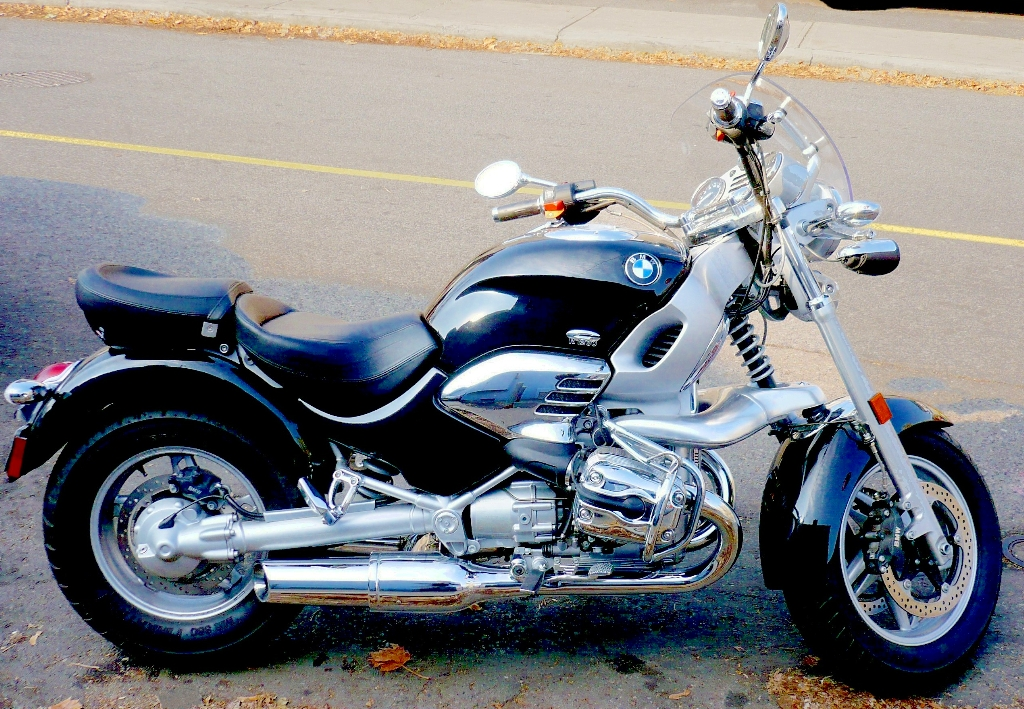
BMW R1200c with Telelever

The Saxon-Motodd (marketed as Telelever by BMW) has an additional swingarm that mounts to the frame and supports the spring. This causes the rake and trail to increase during braking instead of decreasing as with traditional telescopic forks.

=== Hossack/Fior (Duolever) fork ===
The Hossack/Fior (marketed as Duolever by BMW) separates completely the suspension from steering forces. It was developed by Norman Hossack though used by Claude Fior and John Britten on racebikes. Hossack himself described the system as a 'steered upright'. In 2004 BMW announced the K1200S with a new front suspension that is based upon this design.

=== Single-sided ===
A single-sided front swingarm suspension was used on the Yamaha GTS1000, introduced in 1993. The GTS used the RADD, Inc. front suspension designed by James Parker. A single sided girder fork was use on the German Imme R100 motorcycle between 1949 and 1951, and the Vespa scooter has a single-sided trailing-link fork. More recently, between 1998 and 2003, the ItalJet "Dragster" scooter also used a single-sided swingarm suspension, though unlike the GTS1000 there was no upper control arm; the upper part of the suspension on the Dragster served only to transmit steering input.

=== Hub-center steering ===
Hub-center steering is characterized by a swingarm that extends from the bottom of the engine/frame to the centre of the front wheel instead of a fork.

The advantages of using a hub-center steering system instead of a more conventional motorcycle fork are that hub-center steering separates the steering, braking, and suspension functions.

With a fork the braking forces are put through the suspension, a situation that leads to the suspension being compressed, using up a large amount of suspension travel which makes dealing with bumps and other road irregularities extremely difficult. As the forks dive the steering geometry of the bike also changes making the bike more nervous, and inversely on acceleration becomes more lazy. Also, having the steering working through the forks causes problems with stiction, decreasing the effectiveness of the suspension. The length of the typical motorcycle fork means that they act as large levers about the headstock requiring the forks, the headstock, and the frame to be very robust adding to the bike's weight.

The endurance racer "Nessie", built by the Mead & Tomkinson racing team, used an adapted version of Difazio hub-center steering, whereby braking forces were directed to the frame via a pivoted fork (rather than through the steering head). This allowed neutral steering and an absence of brake dive.

== Rear suspension ==
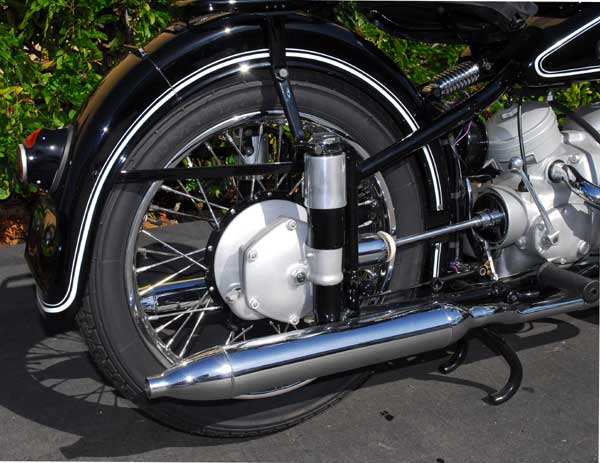
Plunger rear suspension on a BMW R51/3

=== Early rear suspensions ===
While front suspensions were almost universally adopted before World War I, several manufacturers did not use rear suspension on their bikes until after World War II. However, motorcycles with rear suspension were offered to the public before World War I. Notable among these are the 1909 A.S.L. which had both front and rear pneumatic suspension, the 1913 Indian Single with a swingarm suspended from a leaf spring and the 1913 Pope with wheels supported on a pair of plungers which were each suspended by a coil spring.

==== Plunger suspension ====
Several motorcycles before and immediately after World War II used plunger suspension in which the vertical movement of the rear axle was controlled by plungers suspended by springs.

Notable manufacturers of motorcycles with plunger suspension include Adler, Ariel, BMW, BSA, Indian, MZ, Saroléa, Norton, Cossack/Ural and Zündapp.

Although plunger suspension could be sophisticated, with springing and damping in both compression and rebound, it had three disadvantages (compared to the almost universal swingarm that succeeded it), as follows: (i) wheel travel was limited, (ii) the wheel could move out of the required vertical axis, and (iii) it was more expensive to produce and maintain.

=== Swingarms ===
The basic motorcycle swingarm is a quadrilateral, with one short side connected to the motorcycle's frame with bearings so that it can pivot. The other short side is the rear axle around which the rear wheel turns. The long sides are connected to the motorcycle's frame or rear sub-frame with one or two shocks with coil-over springs.

In production motorcycles, swingarms are not exactly rectangular, but their function can be more easily understood by thinking of them as such.

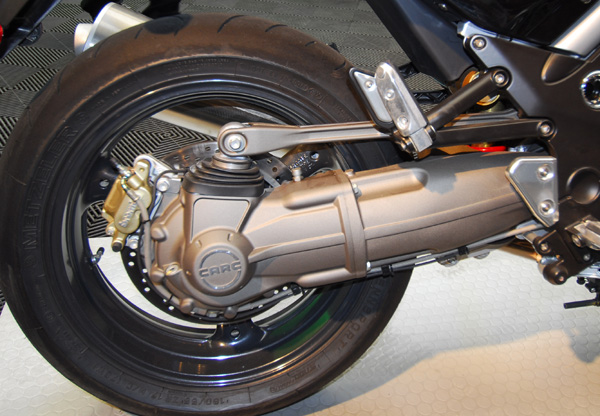
Moto Guzzi's CA.R.C.

When a swingarm is present on only one side of the motorcycle, this is known as a single-sided swingarm. In 1981 BMW introduced the single sided swingarm (mono lever) to motorcycles on their R 80 GS model. Notable examples include the Honda VFR800 and the BMW R- and K-series. Single-sided swingarms make rear-wheel removal easier, though they generally increase the unsprung weight of the rear suspension. This is due to the additional material required to give identical torsional rigidity to a conventional (two-sided) swingarm setup. For this reason sports bikes are rarely seen using the setup. Notable exclusions are the Ducati 916 which was intended to be taken endurance racing, the MV Agusta f4 which has a hollow interior for reduced weight (a magnesium version is also available), and the Ducati 1098, which was given a single sided swingarm purely for styling reasons.

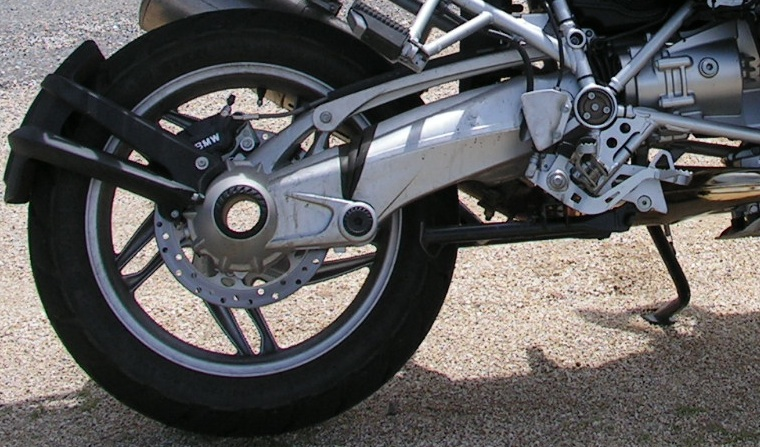
BMW's Paralever rear suspension on a R1200GS

On many shaft-drive motorcycles the drive shaft is contained in one of the long sides of the swingarm. Notable examples include all post-1955 BMW models prior to BMW's use of the single-sided swingarms, Urals, many Moto Guzzi twins, the Honda Goldwing, the Yamaha XS Eleven, and the Yamaha FJR1300.

The BMW R- and K-series combine a shaft-drive contained in the swing arm with a single-sided swingarm, and the combination is marketed as the Paralever. Newer Moto Guzzi motorcycles use a similar arrangement marketed as the CA.R.C. ("CArdano Reattivo Compatto" - Compact Reactive Shaft Drive).

For motorcycles with chain drives, the rear axle can usually be adjusted forward and back in relation to the swingarm, to adjust chain tension, but a few models (such as some 1971/72 Triumph and BSA four-strokes and Ducati 860 GTS and Darmah 900s ) make the adjustment at the swingarm's pivot point.

=== Shock absorbers ===
The hydraulic shock absorbers used on the rear suspensions of motorcycles are essentially the same as those used in other vehicle applications.

Motorcycle shocks do differ slightly in that they nearly always use a coil-over spring. In other words, the spring for the rear suspension is a coil spring that is installed over, or around, the shock.

In terms of adjustment, rear shocks span the range from no adjustments whatsoever to pre-load adjustments only to racing shocks with adjustments for length, pre-load, and four different kinds of damping. Most shocks have internal oil reservoirs, but some have external ones, and some offer air-assisted damping.

A number of companies offer custom-built rear shocks for motorcycles. These shocks are assembled for a specific motorcycle and rider combination, taking into account the characteristics of the motorcycle, the weight of the rider, and the rider's preferred riding style/aggressiveness.

==== Twin shock absorbers ====
Twin shock refers to motorcycles that have two shock absorbers. Generally, this term is used to denote a particular era of motorcycles, and is most frequently used when describing off-road motorcycles.

During the late 1970s and 1980s, motorcycle rear suspension design and performance underwent tremendous advances. The primary goal and result of these advances were increased rear wheel travel, as measured in how far the rear wheel could move up and down. Before this period of intense focus on rear suspension performance, most off-road motorcycles had rear wheel travel of about 3.5–4 inch (9–10 cm). At the end of this period, most of these motorcycles had rear wheel travel of approximately 12 inch (30 cm). At the beginning of this period, various rear suspension designs were used to reach this degree of performance. However, by the end of this period, a design consisting of using only one shock absorber (instead of two) was universally accepted and used. The performance of single shock absorber suspensions was vastly superior to twin shock motorcycles. Accordingly, this design distinction is readily used to categorize motorcycles. With the exception of Bentley and Draper system (New Imperial and Brough Superior machines) and the HRD (later Vincent) system both developed and patented in the 1920s it is only since the 1980s that monoshock motorcycles have been the norm, the term "twinshock" is now used to categorize vintage motorcycles. This distinction is important in that it provides classes used for vintage motorcycle competition. For example, vintage motocross races are held for older motocross motorcycles. To prevent the better-performing monoshock motorcycles from dominating the competition, there are separate competition classes for monoshock and twinshock motorcycles, which prevents them from competing directly against each other.

==== Single shock absorber ====
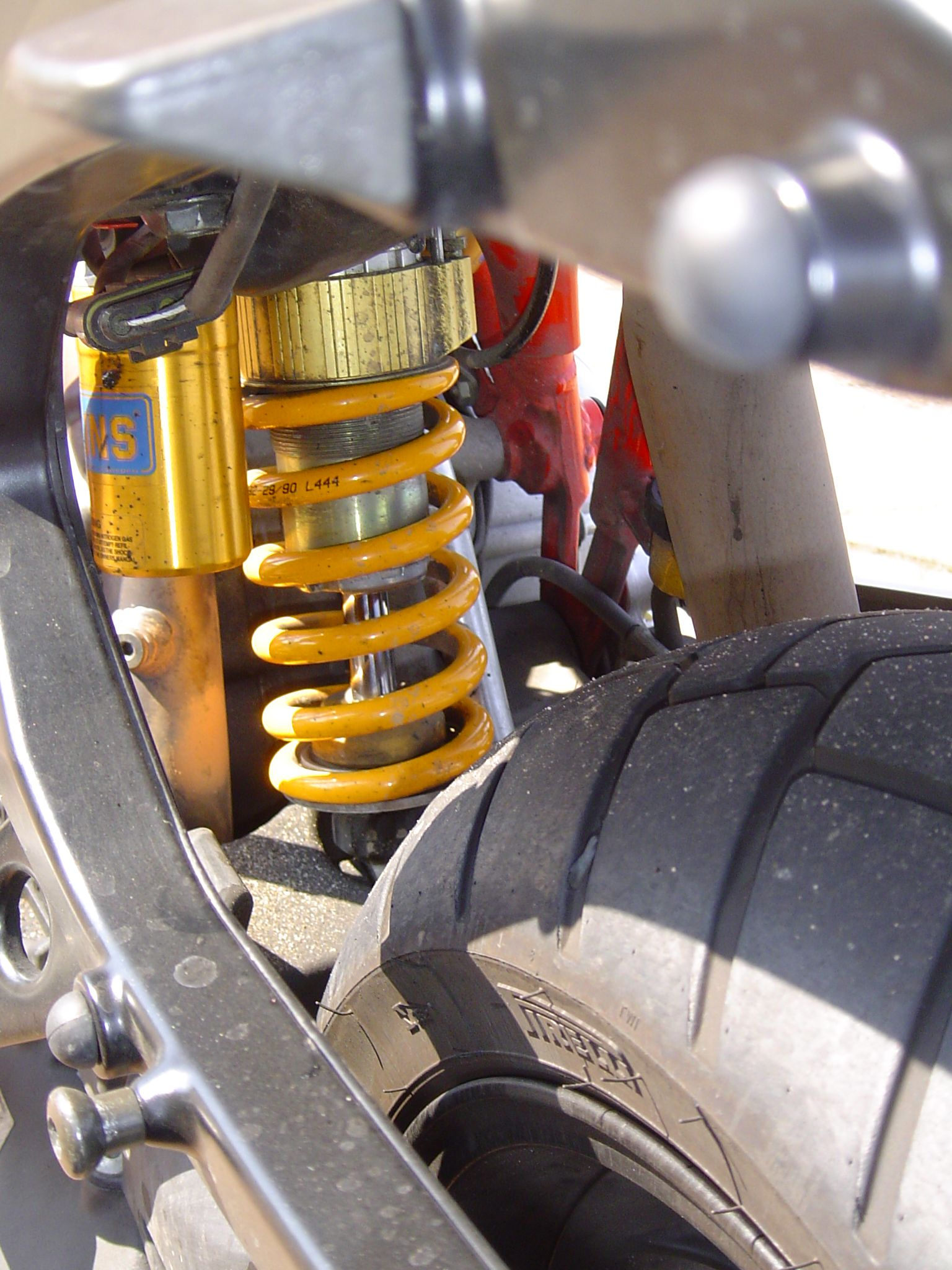
Öhlins Rear Mono-Shock

On a motorcycle with a single shock absorber rear suspension, a single shock absorber connects the rear swingarm to the motorcycle's frame. Typically this lone shock absorber is in front of the rear wheel, and uses a linkage to connect to the swing arm. Such linkages are frequently designed to give a rising rate of damping for the rear. In 1973, Yamaha introduced the Mono-Shock single shock absorber rear suspension system on their motorcycles competing in the Motocross World Championships. The suspension which was designed by Lucien Tilkens, became so successful that other motorcycle manufacturers developed their own single shock absorber designs. Honda's version is called Pro-link, Kawasaki's is Uni-Trak, and Suzuki's is Full-Floater. Honda's Unit Pro-Link, used first on the Honda RC211V MotoGP racer, and then on the 2003 Honda CBR600RR sport bike, is intended to isolate the frame and the steering head from undesirable forces transmitted by the rear suspension by having the dampers upper mount contained within the rear swingarm subframe, rather than connecting it to the frame itself.

== See also ==
- Bicycle suspension
- Suspension (mechanics)
