= Johammer J1 =

Electric motorcycle

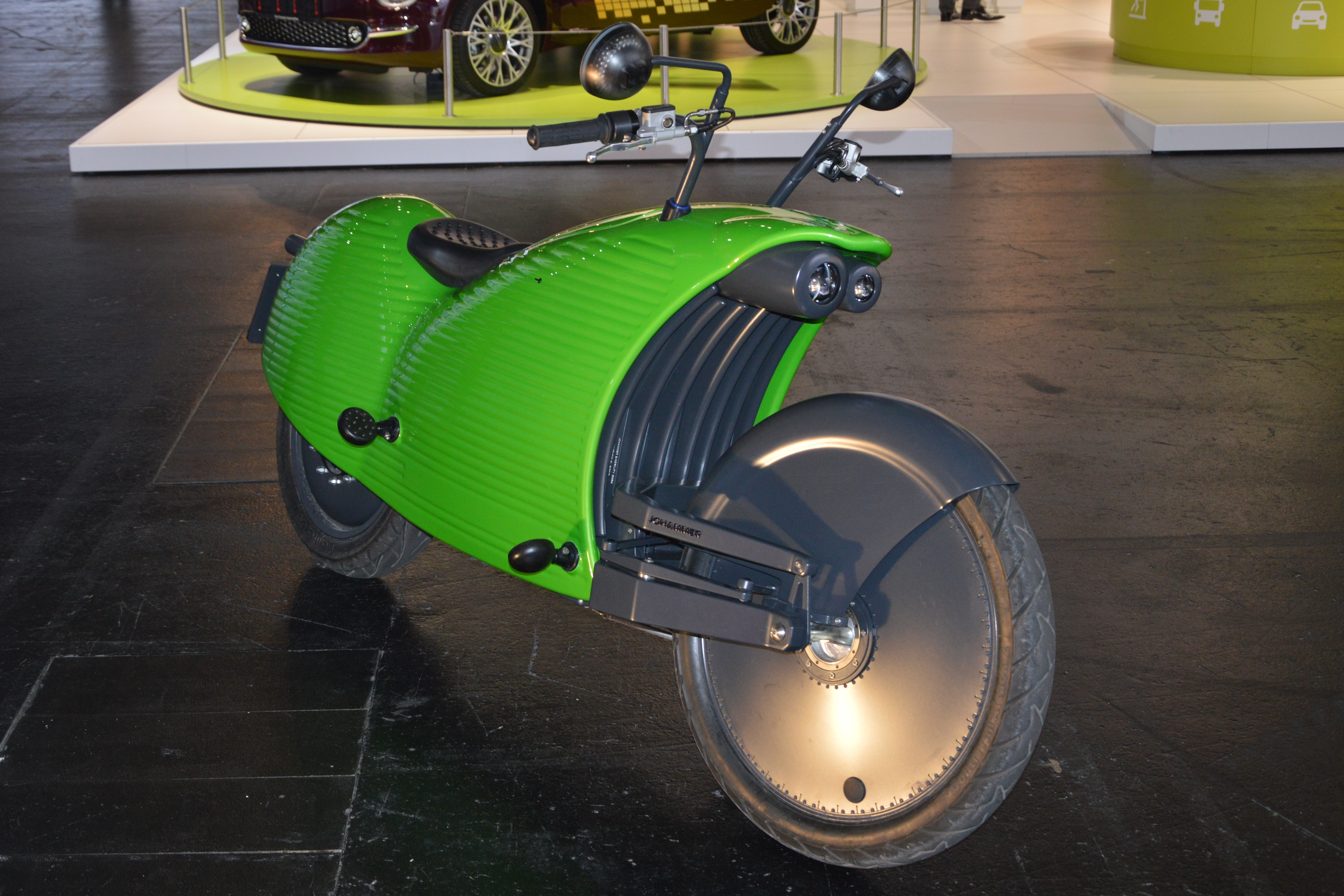
Johammer J1 at exhibition IAA 2015 in Frankfurt, Germany.

The Johammer J1 is an electrical motorcycle manufactured by Johammer e-mobility of Bad Leonfelden, Austria, which was introduced in 2014.

== Specification ==
The bike is driven by a synchronous motor with an output of 11 kW. The empty weight is 178 kg, and top speed is 120 km/h. The range of the batteries, with a capacity of 12.7 kWh, is specified to be between 150 and 200 km. In regenerative operation - for example when driving downhill or during regenerative braking - the synchronous machine energy is recycled into the battery system. The charging time for 80 per cent is 2.5 hours. The motorcycle has a wheelbase of 1,455 mm. It has a unique two-arm steering wheel hub and is reminiscent of the layout of the Majestic.
