= Motorcycle fork =

Component of motorized two-wheelers

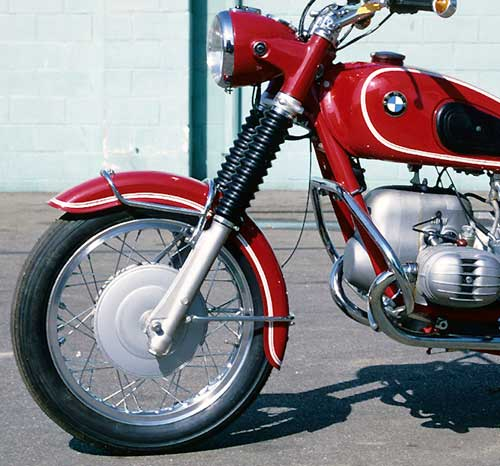
1968 BMW R60US with conventional telescopic fork

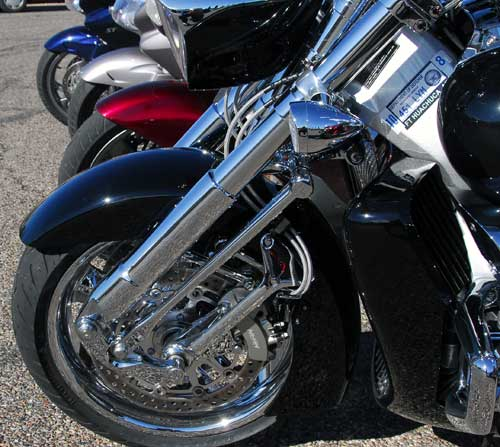
Unusual "trailing bottom link" on a Honda Rune

A motorcycle fork connects a motorcycle's front wheel and axle to its frame, typically via a yoke, also known as a triple clamp, or triple tree, which consists of an upper yoke joined to a lower yoke via a steering stem, a shaft that runs through the steering head, creating the steering axis. Most forks incorporate the front suspension and front brake, and allow the front wheel to rotate about the steering axis so that the motorcycle may be steered. Most handlebars attach to the top clamp in various ways, while clip-on handlebars clamp to the fork tubes, either just above or just below the upper triple clamp.

The fork and its attachment points on the frame establish the critical geometric parameters of rake and trail, which play a major role in defining how a motorcycle handles and dives during braking. While the standard telescopic fork arrangement is found with few major differences among mainstream street motorcycles since the 1970s, historically there have been many variations, including trailing or leading link, springer, Earles, girder, and others, as well as non-fork steering such as hub-center steering.

== Variations ==
A variety of fork arrangements have been tried during more than one hundred years of motorcycle development, several of which remain available today.

=== Telescopic ===
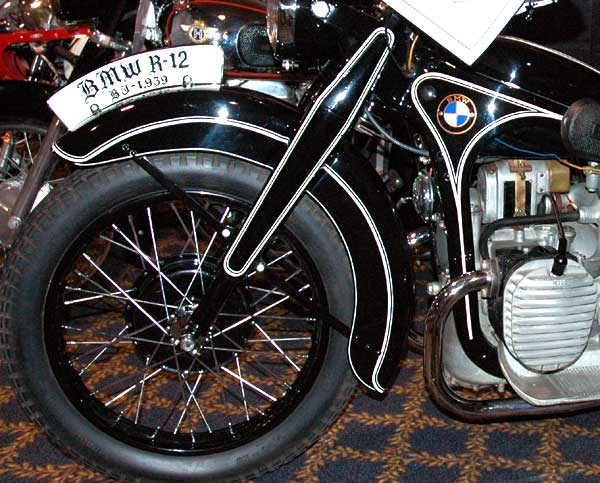
BMW's version of oil-damped telescopic fork, on a 1939 R12

A telescopic fork uses fork tubes which contain the suspension components (coil springs and damper) internally. This is the most common form of fork commercially available. It may or may not include gaiters for protection against abrasive elements on the suspension cylinders. The main advantages of the telescopic fork are that (i) it is simple in design and relatively cheap to manufacture and assemble; (ii) it is lighter than older designs using external components and linkage systems; and (iii) it has a clean and simple appearance that riders find attractive.

Conventionally, the fork stanchions are at the top, secured by a yoke (also called a triple tree or a triple clamp), and the sliders are at the bottom, attached to the front wheel spindle. On some modern sport motorcycles and most off-road motorcycles, this system is inverted, with "sliders" (complete with the spring/damper unit) at the top, clamped to the yoke, while the stanchions are at the bottom. This is done (i) to reduce unsprung weight by having the heavier components suspended, and (ii) to improve the strength and rigidity of the assembly by having the strong large-diameter "sliders" clamped in the yokes. The inverted system is referred to as an upside-down fork, or "USD" for short. A disadvantage of this USD design is that the entire reservoir of damping oil is above the slider seal so that, if the slider seal were to leak, the oil could drain out, rendering any damping ineffective.

=== Trailing link ===
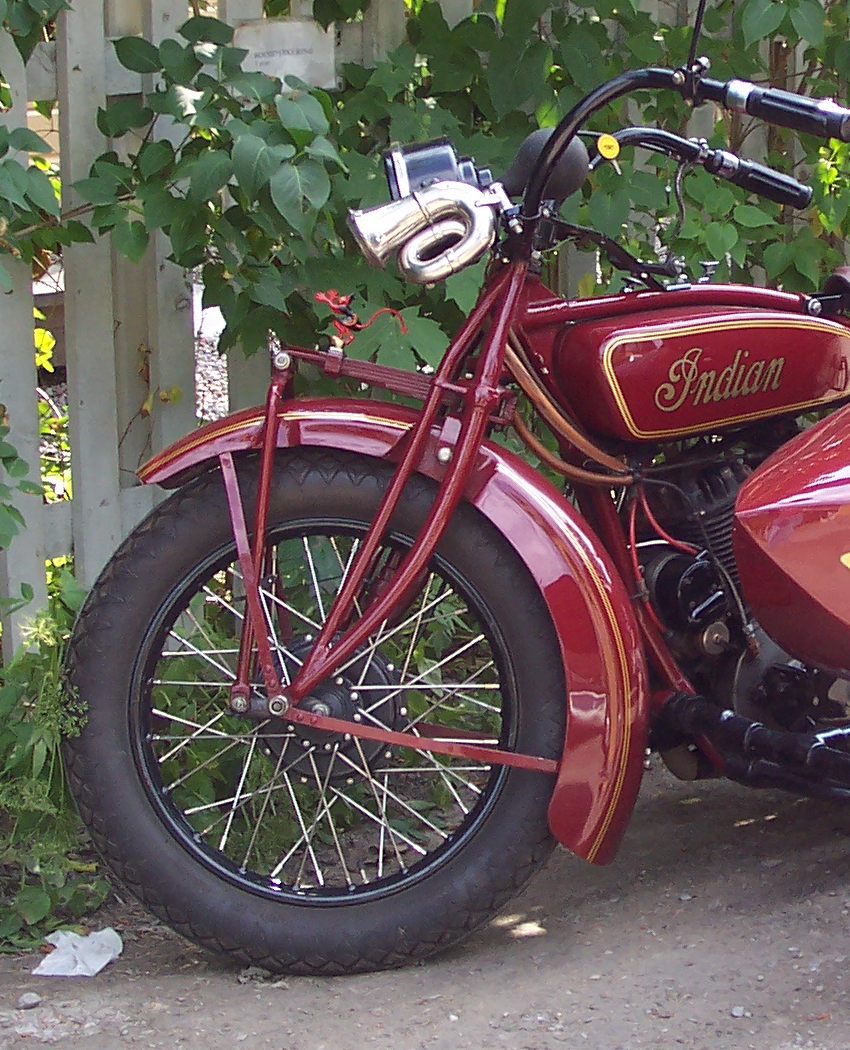
Trailing link fork on a 1928 Indian Big Chief

A trailing link fork suspends the wheel on a link (or links) with a pivot point forward of the wheel axle. It has been used by Indian Motocycle; by BMW on early models such as the R32, and in the USSR on the PMZ-A-750.

=== Leading link ===
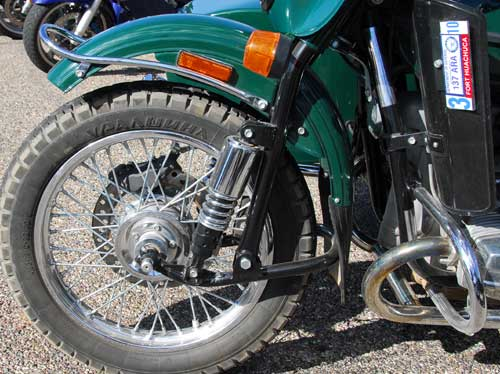
Ural's variant of the leading link fork

A leading link fork suspends the wheel on a link (or links) with a pivot point aft of the wheel axle. Russian Ural motorcycles used leading link forks on sidecar equipped motorcycles, and aftermarket leading link forks are often installed today on motorcycles when they are outfitted with sidecars. They are also very popular with trikes, improving the handling while steering or braking. The most common example of a leading link fork is that found on the Honda Super Cub.

==== Springer ====
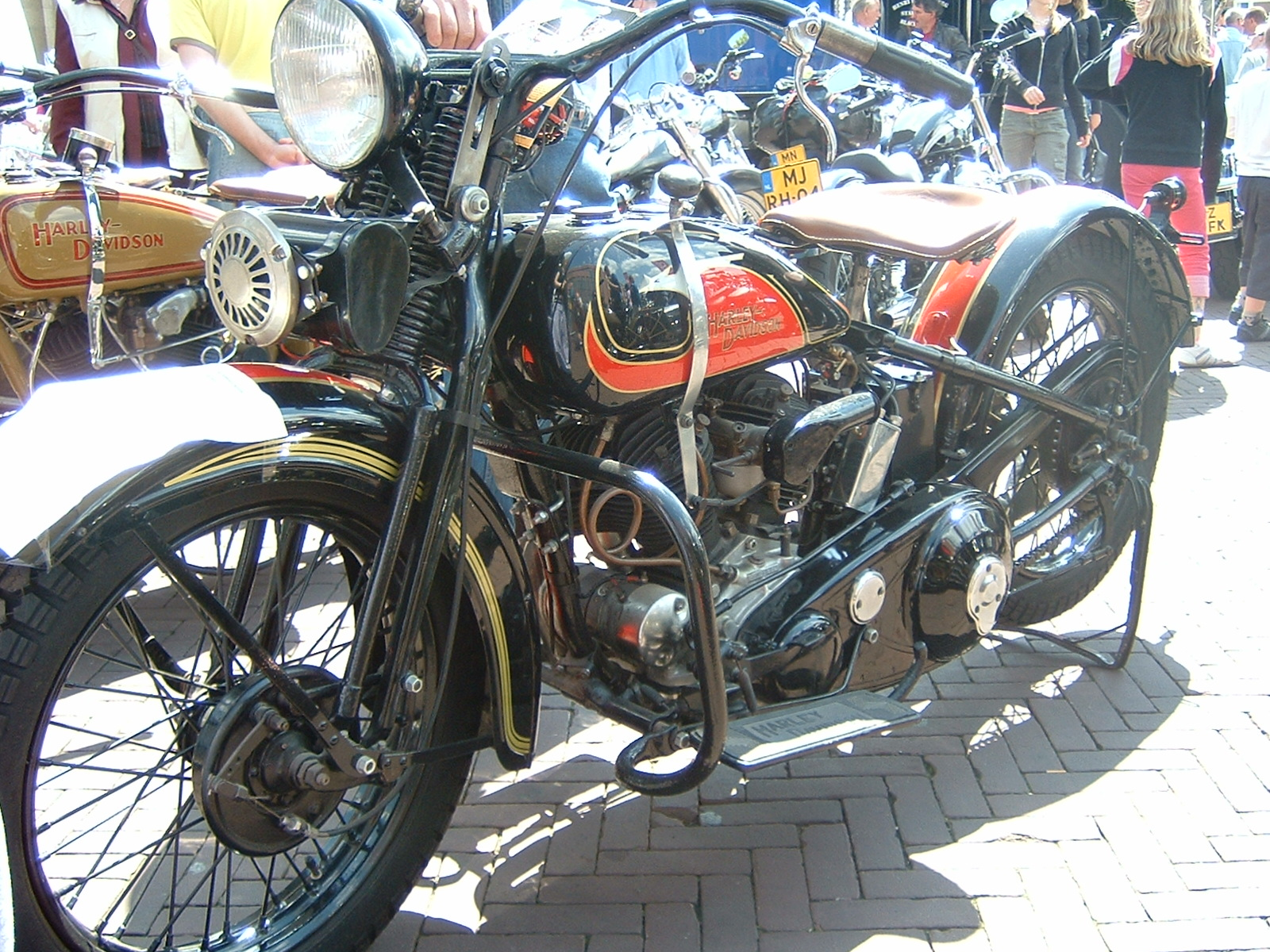
Early Harley-Davidson with springer fork

The springer fork is an early type of leading link fork. A springer fork does not have the suspension built into the fork tubes, but instead has it mounted externally, where it may be integrated into the triple clamp. This style of fork may be found on antique motorcycles or choppers, and is available today on Harley-Davidson's Softail Springer.

While it may have an exposed spring near the triple clamp, a springer fork is distinguishable from a girder fork by its two parallel sets of legs. The rear is firmly fixed to the bottom triple clamp (usually brazed or welded). A short leading link holds the wheel and the forward leg which actuates the springs (usually mounted on the triple clamp).

==== Earles ====
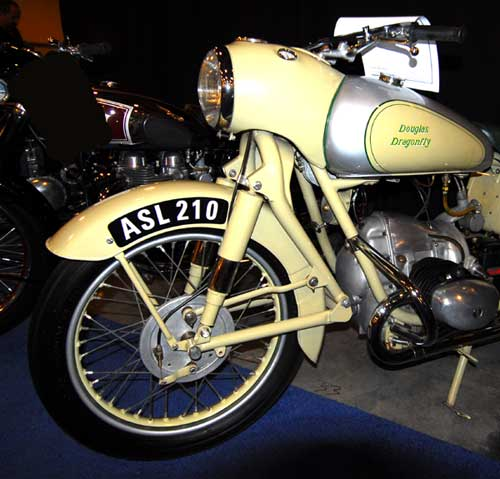
Earles fork on a 1952 Douglas Dragonfly

The Earles fork is a variety of leading link fork where the pivot point is behind the front wheel, which is the basis of the Earles' patent. Patented by Englishman Ernest Earles in 1953, the design is constructed of light tubing, with conventional 'shock absorbers' mounted near the front axle. The Earles fork has a very small wheelbase change under braking or under compression, unlike telescopic forks. Their construction is much stronger than teleforks, especially against lateral deflection caused by hard cornering (as when racing), or when cornering with a sidecar. This triangulated fork causes the front end of a motorcycle to rise slightly when braking hard, as the mechanical braking forces rotate 'downward' relative to the fork's pivot point. This action can be disconcerting to riders used to telescopic forks, which have the opposite reaction to braking forces ('brake dive'). Several motorcycle manufacturers licensed the Earles patent forks for racing motorcycles in 1953, such as MV Agusta and BMW Motorcycle, while other companies (such as Douglas motorcycle) used the Earles design on their roadsters or off-road machines. BMW used Earles forks on all their motorcycles between 1955 and 1968.

=== Girder ===
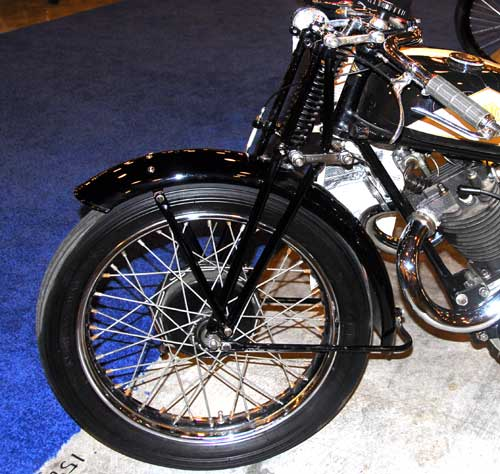
1934 Cotton with girder fork

One of the earliest types of motorcycle front suspension, the girder fork consists of a pair of uprights attached to the triple clamp by linkages with a spring usually between the top and bottom triple clamps. The design reached a peak in the "Girdraulics" used on Vincent motorcycles from 1948. Girdraulic forks featured hydraulic damping with forged alloy blades providing extra strength.

While both may have an exposed spring near the triple clamp, a girder fork is distinguishable from a springer fork by the wheel being fixed firmly to the (usually a long diamond shape) upright. The pivot points are short links mounted to the top and bottom triple clamps. The spring is usually mounted to the girder and compressed against the upper triple clamp.

Although girder forks are associated with early motorcycles, the British Ariel Ace, a modern sports motorcycle, has an alloy space frame and a matching girder fork. This Ariel girder fork is just as prone to brake dive as any telescopic fork, but is claimed to be more resistant to torsional twisting.

=== Saxon-Motodd (Telelever) ===
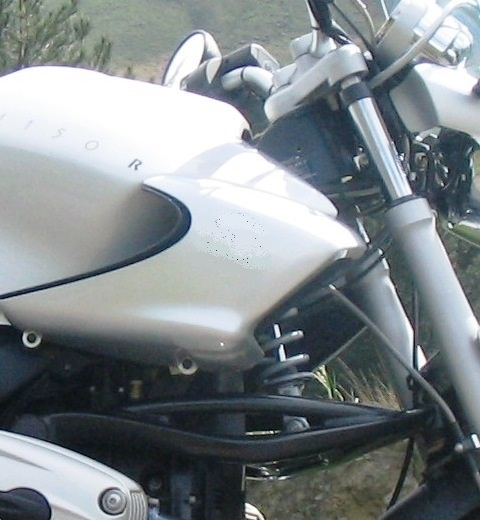
Telelever fork on a BMW R1150R

The Saxon-Motodd fork (marketed as Telelever by BMW) has a wishbone that mounts to the frame and supports the monoshock unit. This relieves the forks of any braking and suspension forces. With a Saxon-Motodd fork, the trail and caster angle (rake) increases during braking instead of decreasing as with traditional telescopic forks. BMW's boxer twins have been equipped with Telelever forks since 1994, but some newer boxers like the BMW R nineT have reverted to conventional telescopic forks for aesthetic and packaging reasons.

=== Hossack/Fior (Duolever) ===
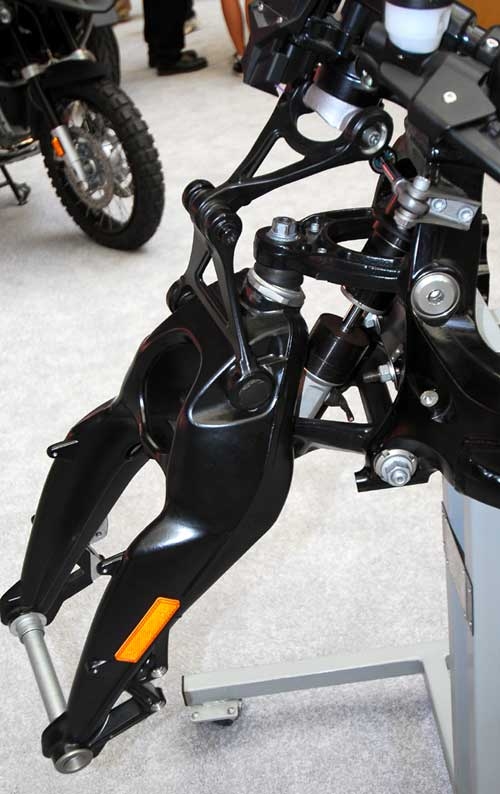
Duolever front fork

The Hossack/Fior fork (marketed as Duolever by BMW) completely separates the suspension from steering forces. Developed by Norman Hossack and used by Claude Fior and John Britten on racing motorcycles, Hossack described the system as a 'steered upright'. In 2004 BMW announced the K1200S with a new front suspension that appears to be based upon the design. As of 2024, the Duolever is on the BMW K models: K1200R, K1300R, K1200S, K1300S, K1200GT, K1300GT and K1600.

=== Coaxial steering front suspension ===
Developed by MotoCzysz for their C1 and awarded United States Patent 7111700 on September 26, 2006. Defined as a motorcycle or bicycle front end having coaxial steering and suspension components, and having telescopic forks. Swing weight of the forks is dramatically reduced by removing their suspension components to the central location, coaxially within the steering tube. Ride height can be adjusted without loosening the forks in the triple clamps.

This particular fork, as implemented on the MotoCzysz C1, also has adjustable trail, from 89 mm to 101 mm.

=== Non-forks ===
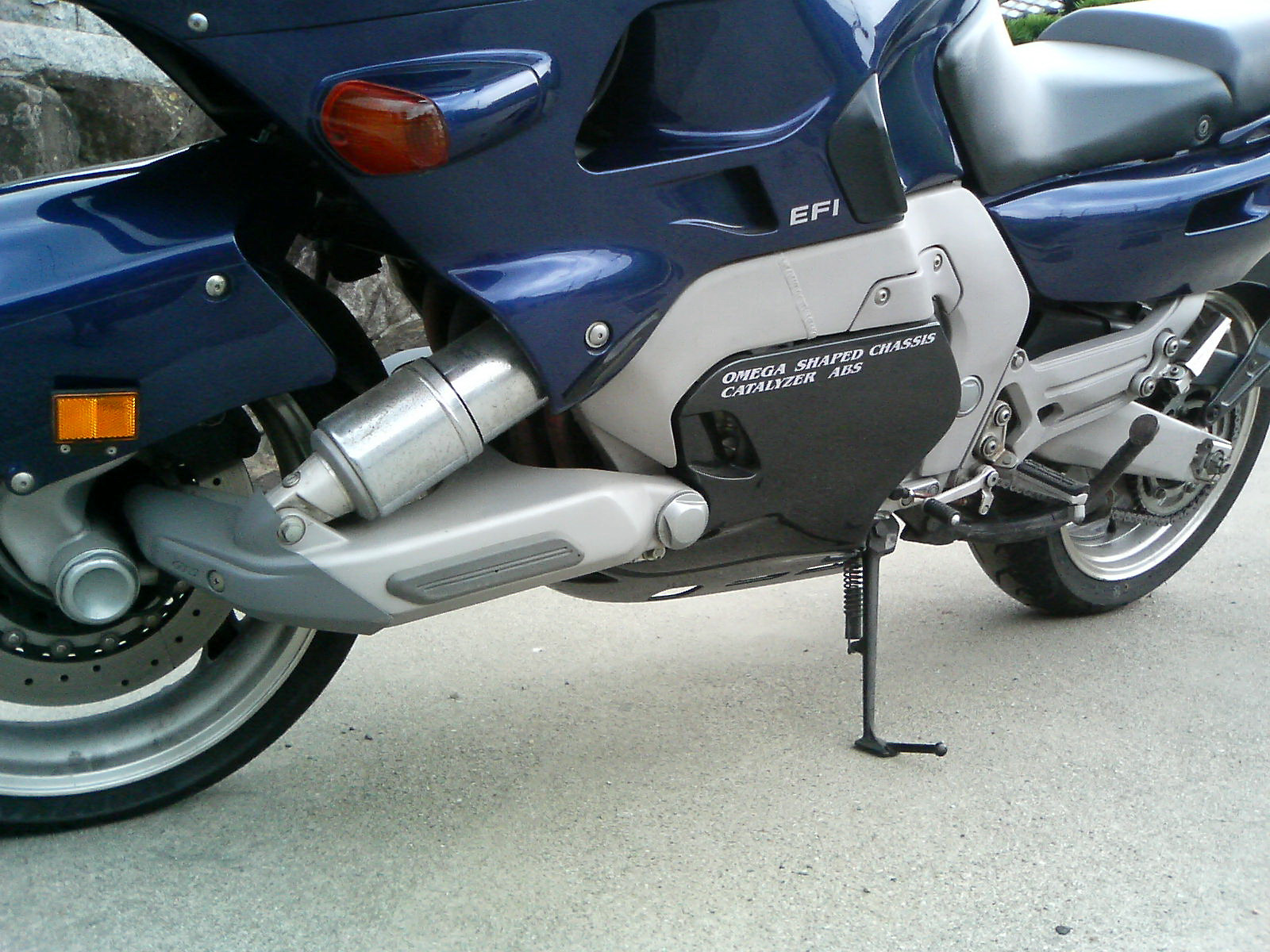
Yamaha GTS1000 suspension

There have been several attempts to implement front steering and suspension without using anything that could be described as a "fork". Examples include hub-center steering, used as early as 1920 on the Ner-a-Car, and implemented in the 1990s on the Bimota Tesi and the Yamaha GTS1000

A single-sided girder "fork" was used by the German firm Imme between 1949 and 1951.

Mead & Tomkinson Racing competed in endurance racing in the 1970s with "Nessie," a Laverda-based racing motorcycle with hub-centre steering.

== See also ==
- Bicycle and motorcycle dynamics
- Bicycle and motorcycle geometry
- Bicycle fork
- Hub-center steering
- Suspension (motorcycle)
- Suspension (mechanics)
