= Cross-country cycling =

Discipline of mountain biking

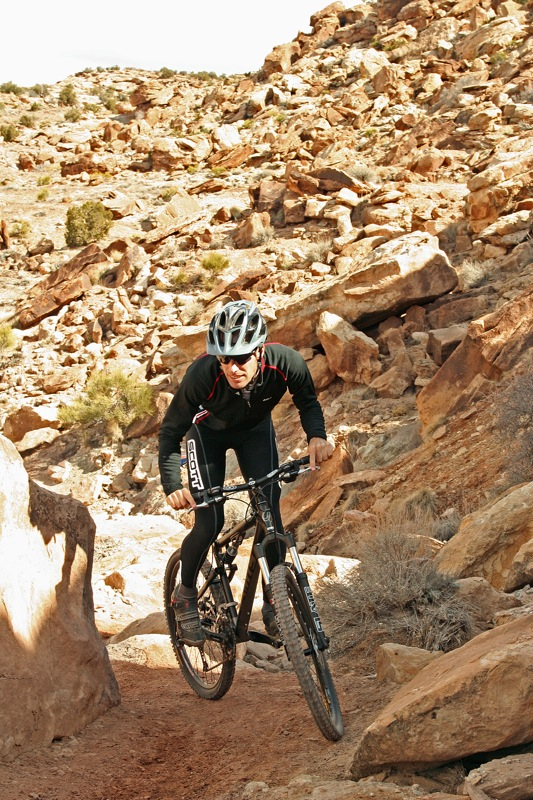
A cross-country mountain biker on a trail in Utah, USA.

Cross-country (XC) cycling is a discipline of mountain biking and mountain bike racing. Cross-country cycling became an Olympic sport in 1996 and is the only form of mountain biking practiced at the Olympics.

== Terrain ==
Cross-country cycling is defined by the terrain on which it is performed. XC courses and trails consist of a mix of rough forest paths and singletrack (also referred to as doubletrack depending on width), smooth fireroads, and even paved paths connecting other trails. Cross-country may be considered "easy" or "intermediate", due to the concept that this discipline of mountain biking relies more on endurance ability than technical prowess, but modern cross-country race courses are known to require a high degree of technical skill, especially since the 2012 Olymic Games in London.

== Bikes and equipment ==
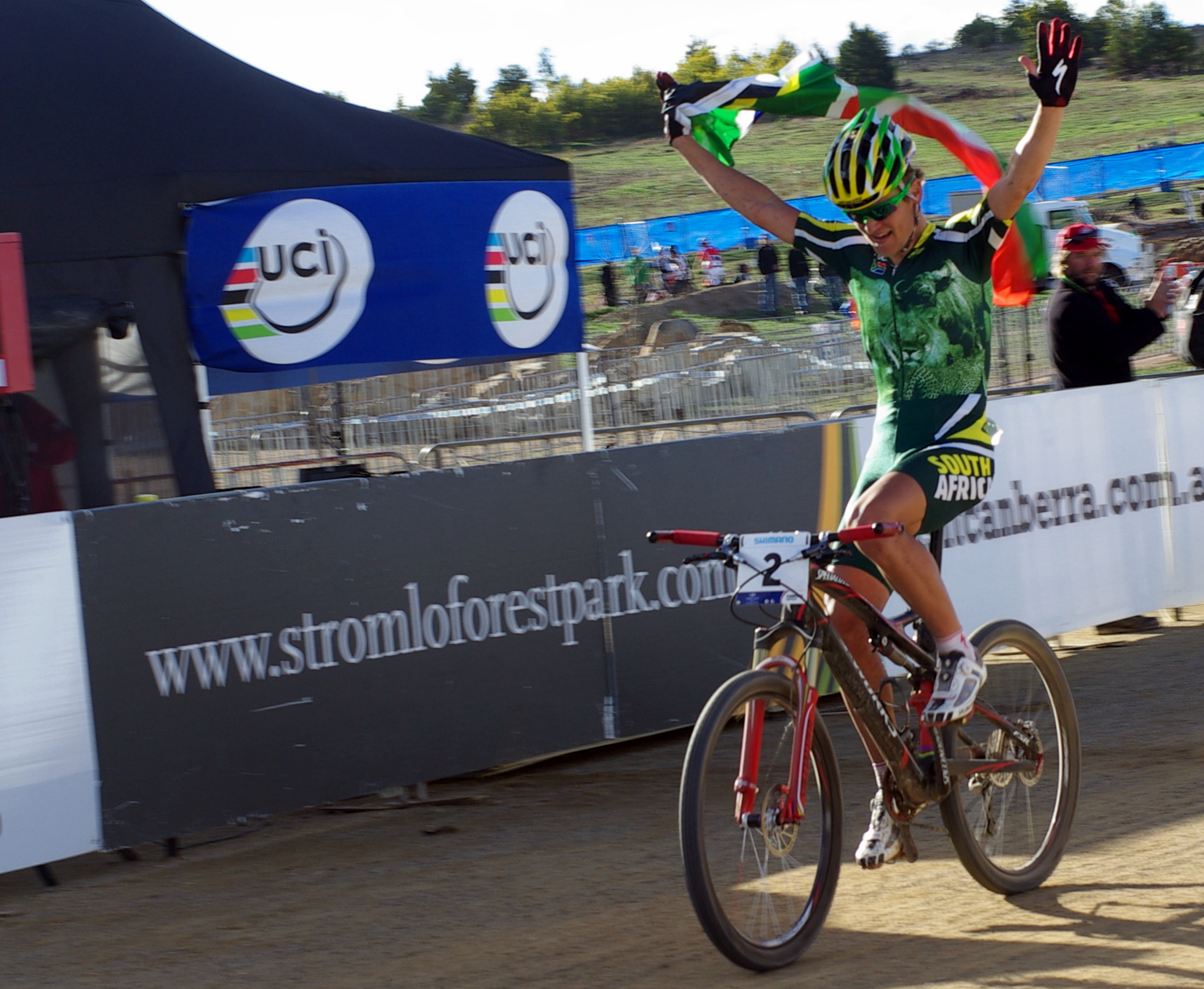
South African Burry Stander winning on a dual-suspension Specialized.

Cross-country bicycles are some of the lightest mountain bikes, typically between 7.5 and 12.5 kilograms (17 and 28 lb). They usually feature suspension forks in front and often have suspension in the rear. In both the front and rear, most XC bicycles have approximately 100 and 120 millimetres (10.0 and 12.0 cm; 3.9 and 4.7 in) of suspension travel in the front and 120 millimeters in the rear. The geometry of the frames generally places the rider in a little more upright position than on a road bicycle but much less than on a downhill bike which allows for more nimble handling and better climbing characteristics along with a more comfortable pedaling position at the expense of stability, especially when going downhill. Despite this, most brands are designing their cross-country bikes to have more stable handling, especially when going downhill at the expense of nimble handling and better climbing characteristics, but less so.

Bicycle helmets are nearly universally used for cross-country riding. However, XC riders only rarely wear full-face helmets and do not wear the full body "armor" employed by downhill riders and tend to wear helmets similar to well ventilated road helmets, but helmets most often used by enduro and trail riders are also used. Cross-country cyclists are more prone to injuries than road cyclists; however, the injuries sustained by XC riders are usually not as severe.

== Racing ==
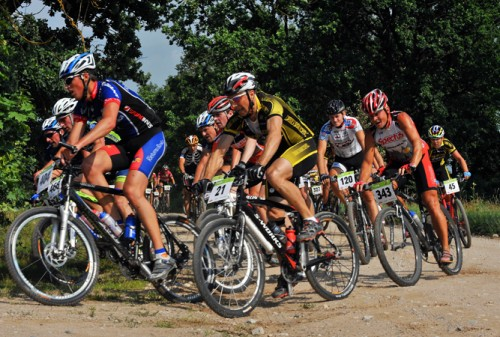
A cross-country mountain biking race.

Cross-country racing emphasizes endurance above technical prowess, and races vary from 30 minutes to 24 hours in length. More recently a new category has emerged called Marathon Cross Country or "Marathon Distance". Generally, the marathon distance bike races are over 50 miles. Anything under 50 miles is still called cross country. Additionally, many mountain bike races are divided up into stages so as to span several days. Races can be either point-to-point or lap-based. Short-track cross-country consists of many very short laps so as to be spectator-friendly.

Unlike downhill races, which are conducted in a time trial format, cross-country races traditionally feature a mass start or interval start, where riders are released in several large groups divided by age and/or ability. Races with very large fields that do not wish to stagger starts will sometimes employ a Le Mans start where racers begin by running to their bikes.

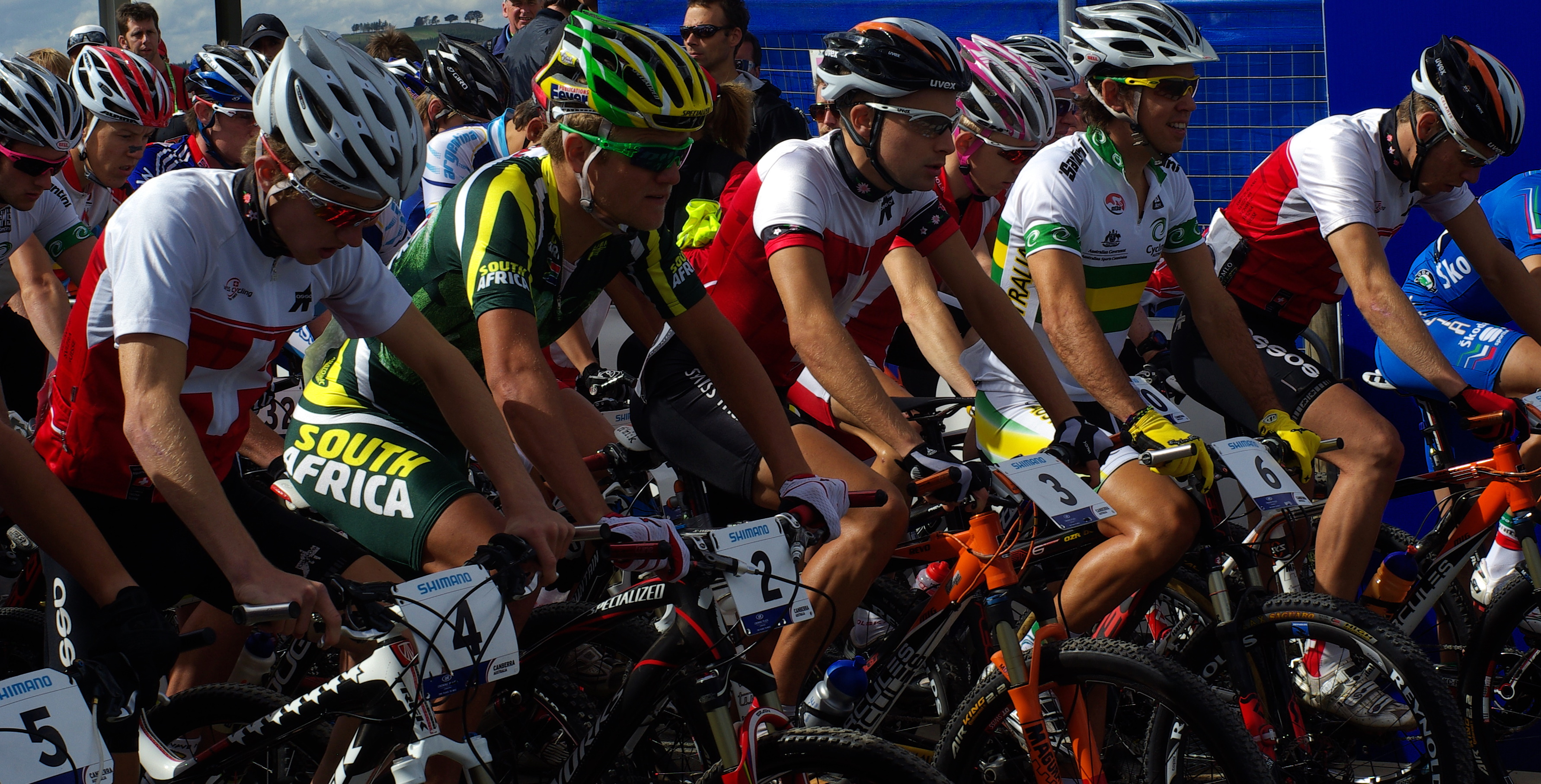
Start line for the under 23 men's cross-country race at the 2009 UCI World Championships.

Globally, XC racing is governed by the Union Cycliste Internationale. In the United States, it is under the purview of USA Cycling. In the United Kingdom, British Cycling is the governing body.

== Racing disciplines ==
XC racing exists in four main formats: XCE (Cross-Country eliminator), XCO (Cross-Country Olympic), XCC (Cross-Country Short Circuit) and XCM (Cross-Country Marathon).

=== Cross-Country Eliminator (XCE) ===
A discipline where the top two riders advance to the next round and the other two riders are eliminated. Each race has a maximum duration of 60 seconds. It is similar to four-cross, which is a downhill discipline.

=== Cross-Country Olympic (XCO) ===
Consists of completing multiple laps around a 4–10 km (2.5–6.2 mi) circuit, with a duration of about 90 minutes for elite classes. It is the only cross-country discipline in the Olympics programme.

=== Cross-Country Short Circuit (XCC) ===
A race similar to XCO racing, but with laps typically under 1.0–2.0 km (0.62–1.24 mi) in length in less technical terrain, and a duration of 20–25 minutes. Similarly, the number of laps is determined by how many laps can be completed in that timeframe at maximum given previous lap times.

XCC races typically determine the order that racers in an XCO race will be in and are typically held 2 days before the XCO race if they will determine the starting order.

=== Cross-Country Marathon (XCM) ===
With a route usually between 65 and 100 km. It has gained popularity in the last years, because XCM competition participation is open to everyone, including beginners.

== Wheel size ==
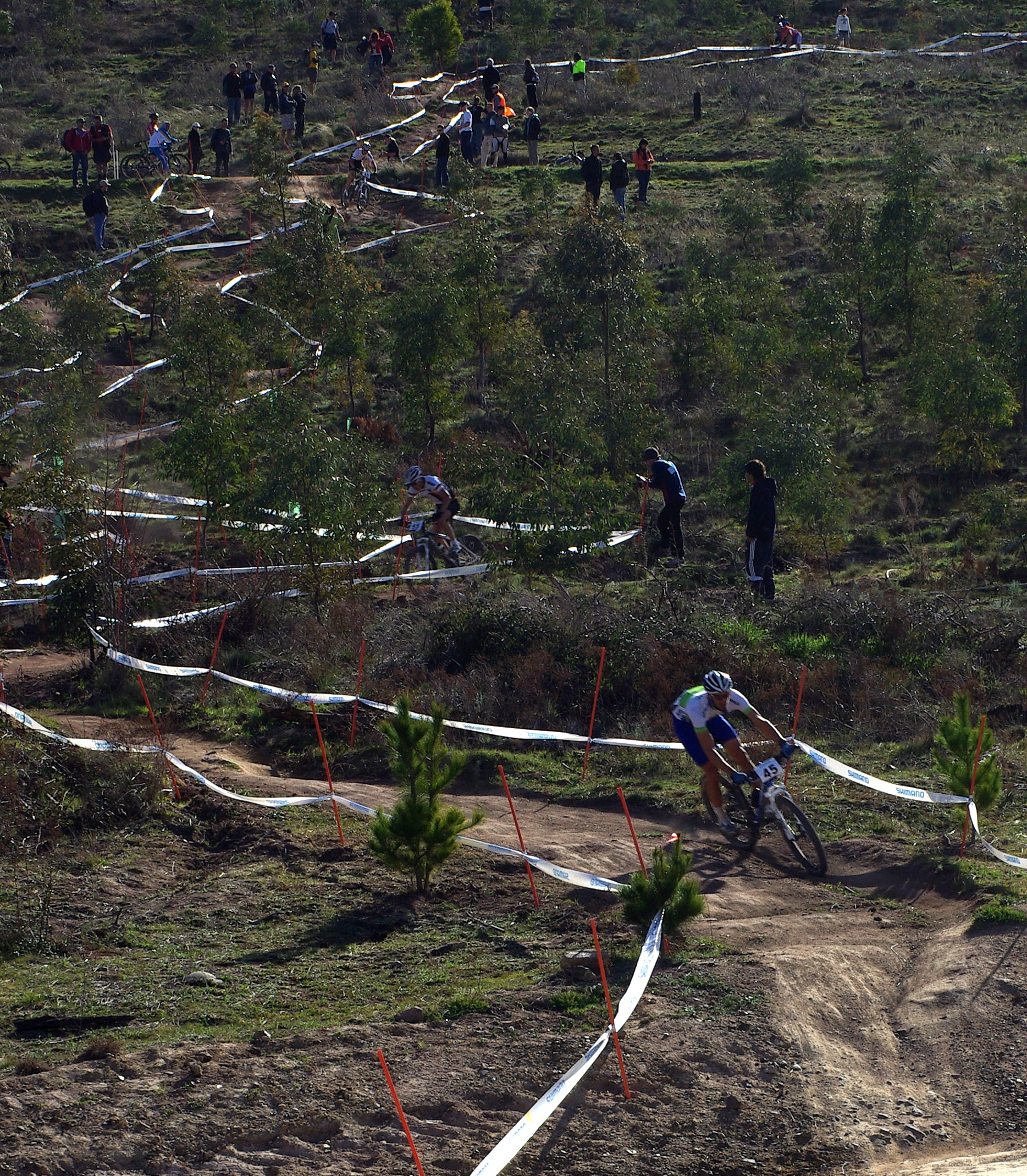
Course used at the 2009 UCI World Championships in Australia.

In cross-country, a wider variety of wheel sizes have been used historically compared to other disciplines, although recently most riders have settled on a single wheel size. The 26-inch wheel size initially used in mountain biking has all but died off at the top level of cross-country racing, with 29″ wheels becoming the norm and 650b wheels being used occasionally. 650b wheels are 584 mm diameter wheels, and approximately 27.5″ with a mounted tire, hence their more common name, "27.5 inch wheels."

Most manufacturers of new cross-country bikes no longer offer bikes with 26″ wheels; 650b wheels are becoming less common and typically are only present on a handful of lower end cross-country bikes. 29″ wheels have become the standard available on all but a select few cross-country bikes and are the only wheel size used at most XC races (this is most notable at professional level races such as the UCI Mountain Bike World Championships where 29″ wheels are the only wheel size used). 29″ inch wheels started rapidly gaining popularity in the mid to late 2000s, and have become very successful in cross-country racing as a whole. A notable boost to their popularity came with Lance Armstrong, racing and winning on a Gary Fisher 29er. Advantages to the larger wheel formats are less need for suspension due to a decreased angle of attack, more energy propelling the bike forward per pedal stroke, and also less loss of momentum. Disadvantages include slightly increased weight, decreased acceleration, higher rolling inertia, rider fit issues for those under 5 ft 5 in (165 cm), and slower handling, although handling issues are being addressed successfully in newer designs with geometry changes like steeper head tube angles and higher fork offsets (although these changes are being reversed slowly by most brands to increase stability). A further disadvantage is that, all other variables (spoke number, rim design and material, etc.) being equal, a 26″ wheel will be much stronger than a 29″ one.

In recent years, bike manufacturers and component companies began experimenting with 32" wheels. The argument is that 32" wheels offer the same benefits as 29" wheels to a greater degree. However, there are still concerns about the wheel size relating to sizing for smaller riders and maneuverability. Travis Brown, a former professional mountain biker and competitor at the 2000 Sydney Olympic Games, was one of the first people to test 32" wheels working in product development for Trek.

== See also ==
- Mountain bike racing
- NORBA
- Union Cycliste Internationale
- Cross-country eliminator
