= Front fork =

The front fork is a suspension component for either:

- Bicycle fork
- Motorcycle fork
