= Downhill bike =

Type of mountain bike

A Giant Faith 2 downhill mountain bike with 6.5 inches of travel in the front and 8 inches in the rear.

Racing a downhill bike at Horseshoe Valley In Ontario

A downhill bike (also known as a downhill mountain bike) is a full suspension bicycle designed for downhill cycling on particularly steep, technical trails. Unlike a typical mountain bike, durability and stability are the most important design features, compared to lighter, more versatile cross-country bikes. Downhill bikes are primarily intended for high-speed descent, and downhill riders will usually shove, or shuttle via chairlifts or motorized vehicles, to the trailhead. Downhill bikes share similarities with freeride bikes due to their large strong frames and increased travel.

== Geometry ==
These bikes will also have very slack head tube angles (63.5 degrees or less), long wheelbases (over 45 inches or 1,143 mm), and will accommodate the use of up to 2.5-inch (63.5 mm) width knobbed tires. Downhill frames are also overbuilt to handle the stress of riding over rocky terrain, drops, and jumps. Bike weights have been typically over 34 lb (15.4 kg), but modern downhill bikes have broken the 30 lb (13.6 kg) weight barrier (with some custom builds on carbon frames weighing between 27–29 lb (12–13 kg)). Some newer downhill bikes can be built to weigh under 30 lb (13.6 kg), but it is rare, because nowadays riders tend to care more about quality and performance rather than sheer weight.

Adjustable head tube angles are also available to adapt the bike to the owner's preferred style of riding.

== Components ==
=== Suspension ===
Will typically have 7–10 inches (178–254 mm) of rear suspension travel, and be designed around a 7–8-inch (178–203 mm) suspension fork. The suspension sag is also much higher than cross-country bikes (25%-50% of total travel vs. 10%-20%) for a more supple ride at higher speeds.

=== Fork ===
Other innovations include the use of OnePointFive head tube standard, which uses a 1.5 in (38 mm) wide steerer tube, instead of the more conventional 1.125 in (29 mm) diameter, for added stiffness and strength. Most downhill bikes use dual crown forks which allow longer travel at the front(usually 203 mm or 8 in and increased stiffness that a single crown fork cannot offer. Drawbacks though, are increased weight and reduced turning radius.

=== Brakes ===
Downhill bikes usually have hydraulic, quad piston disc brakes, and the discs may be 200 mm or larger. Brake discs and calipers may come with finned heatsinks for better heat dissipation.

=== Drivetrain ===
Downhill bikes usually have a chain guide to prevent accidental chain derailment. Some manufacturers are experimenting with internal gearboxes for improved reliability. Cassettes will usually only contain a few small sprockets instead of the 12 sprockets found on other types of mountain bikes.

=== Tires ===
Downhill bikes need very strong tires and wheels. The standard wheel size for downhill bikes was 27.5, but with recent changes to UCI World Cup Downhill rules, almost all brands have switched to 29″ and "mullet" 29″ cross 27.5″ downhill bikes. Tires are usually 2.5-2.6″ wide, plus tires are 2.8-3.0″. Plus tires are only used in recreational riding, not competition.

== Materials ==
Downhill bikes are typically made of steel, aluminum or carbon fiber. Some manufacturers have started using 3d printed "lugs" for a more personalized geometry.

== See also ==
- Mountain bike
- Mountain biking
- Downhill mountain biking
- Bicycle suspension
- Single track (mountain biking)
- Glossary of cycling
- Outline of cycling
