= Geoff Apps =

English bicycle engineer

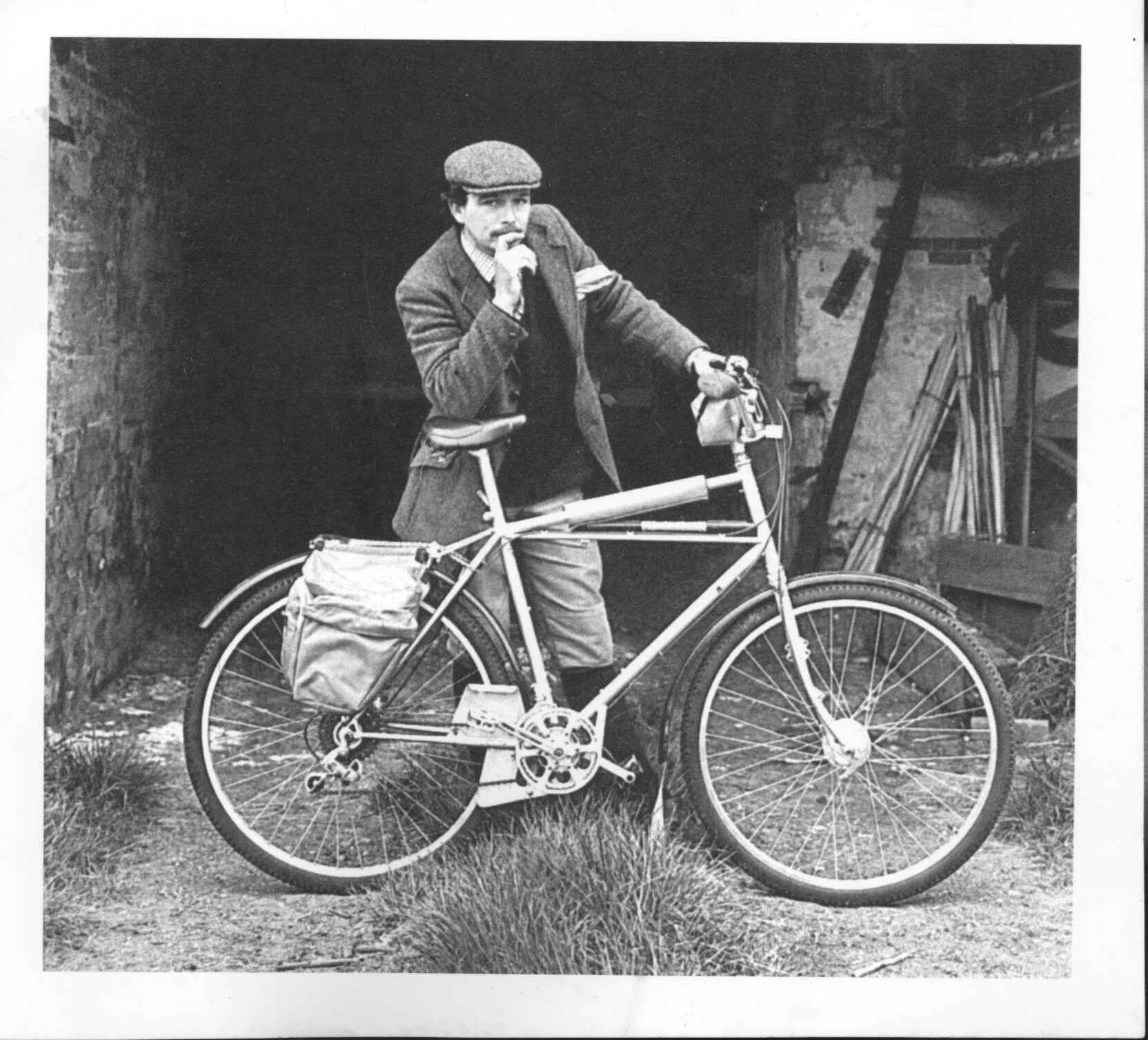
- Apps with one of his 'Range Rider' off-road cycles
- Born: Geoffrey Cleland Apps; 4 December 1949; London, England
- Died: 25 July 2024 (aged 74); Chirnside, Scotland

Geoffrey Cleland Apps (born London, England, 1949 and died Chirnside, Scotland, 2024) was an English pioneer of all-terrain bicycles.

== Beginnings ==
Geoff Apps' family moved near the Chiltern Hills north-west of London, where he cycled in the woods. He took up motorcycle observed trials riding but was unhappy with the noise and disturbance.

He began modifying conventional bicycles for off-road use in 1965. By 1979 he had designed and created a lightweight bicycle for the wet mud of south-east England that used 650Bx54 Nokia Hakkapeliitta snow tyres from Finland. Apps set up Cleland Cycles Ltd to manufacture copies of his Aventura design in 1982 and these were sold under Apps' Cleland Cycles brand until 1984. They were designed for touring, in which reliability and comfort were more important than speed and racing. Companies in Britain produced their own versions, notably English Cycles and Highpath Engineering.

The Range-Rider had a number of interesting features. The frame was built with Reynolds 531 butted tubing throughout including the extra diagonal brace from the top of the seat tube to the bottom of the head tube. The extra wide bottom bracket featured needle roller bearings and flat thrust bearings rather than traditional ball-bearing cup design. Double chainrings and outer guard ring with 5 rear sprockets gave a wide range with a low ratio 20.6” gear which with the tungsten carbide studded Hakka tyres allowed riders to climb extreme gradients. In October 1981 a Range-Rider was ridden up Snowdon, the highest mountain in Wales. A bash plate and mud guard protected the chainrings. Hub brakes were fitted to overcome any effects of mud and water on rim brakes. Mudguards were modified to have the brackets on the outside to reduce mud buildup. Spoke holes in the rims were drilled out to accept heavy-duty spoke 12-gauge spokes. With tyre pressures lowered the ride off-road was extraordinary with grip and traction levels better than many riders could exploit. On the road, with the Hakkas pumped up hard, the ride was noisy but wonderful on ice. With less extreme tyres it felt quicker and gave a confidence-inspiring ride with the stiff light frame.

== American links ==
Apps read about the Ritchey-built MountainBikes mountain bike in the February 1980 BMX Plus and contacted Gary Fisher and Charlie Kelly at the MountainBikes Company in Fairfax, California. Apps told them about the off-road bicycles he had built and of large diameter 650Bx54 and 700Cx47 Nokia Hakkapeliitta snow tyres that were made in Finland. In December 2006, Fisher said of Apps’s 1980 contact: "We got some tires from Geoff Apps really early on and we said ‘Holy Toledo!’" But poor supply meant the fledgling MTB industry stuck with the smaller wheels.

Apps lived in Scotland where he continued to ride and develop bicycles until his death. He cofounded and contributed to, Making Tracks before moving to Scotland to work on New Cyclist. He was an illustrator and draughtsman, his work appearing in publications including Bicycle Design.

== Bibliography ==
- The Bicycle Book: The Complete Maintenance Guide (ISBN 0-517-08743-X) 1993
- Co-author with James McGurn, Cross Country Cycling: The Guide for the Off-road Leisure Rider (Teach Yourself) (ISBN 0-340-58654-0) 1993.

== See also ==
- History of the mountain bike and mountain biking
- 29er (bicycle)

== Sources ==
- The Mountain Bike Book by Rob Van der Plas, 1984. ISBN 0-916753-01-8 pages, 70,95,113,125,130.
- Richard's Mountain Bike Book, by Charles Kelly and Nick Crane, 1988. ISBN 0-946609-78-0 page 176-178.
- The Mountain Biking Handbook by Barry Ricketts, 1988. ISBN 1-85443-005-X pages, 17,34,100-101, 175-177.
- The Off-Road Bicycle Book by Tom Bogdanowicz and others, 1992.ISBN 0-948135-40-9 page 8-9.
- Cross-Country Cycling by Jim McGurn and Edgar Newton, 1993. ISBN 0-340-58654-0 page 89-91.
- The Biography of the Modern Bike by Chris Boardman and Chris Sidwells, 2015. ISBN 978-1-84403-783-4 pages 111,138-139.
- DK-The Bicycle Book Edited by Chauney Dunford, 2016. ISBN 978-0-2412-2611-7 page 166.
