= 27.5 mountain bike =

Type of mountain bike

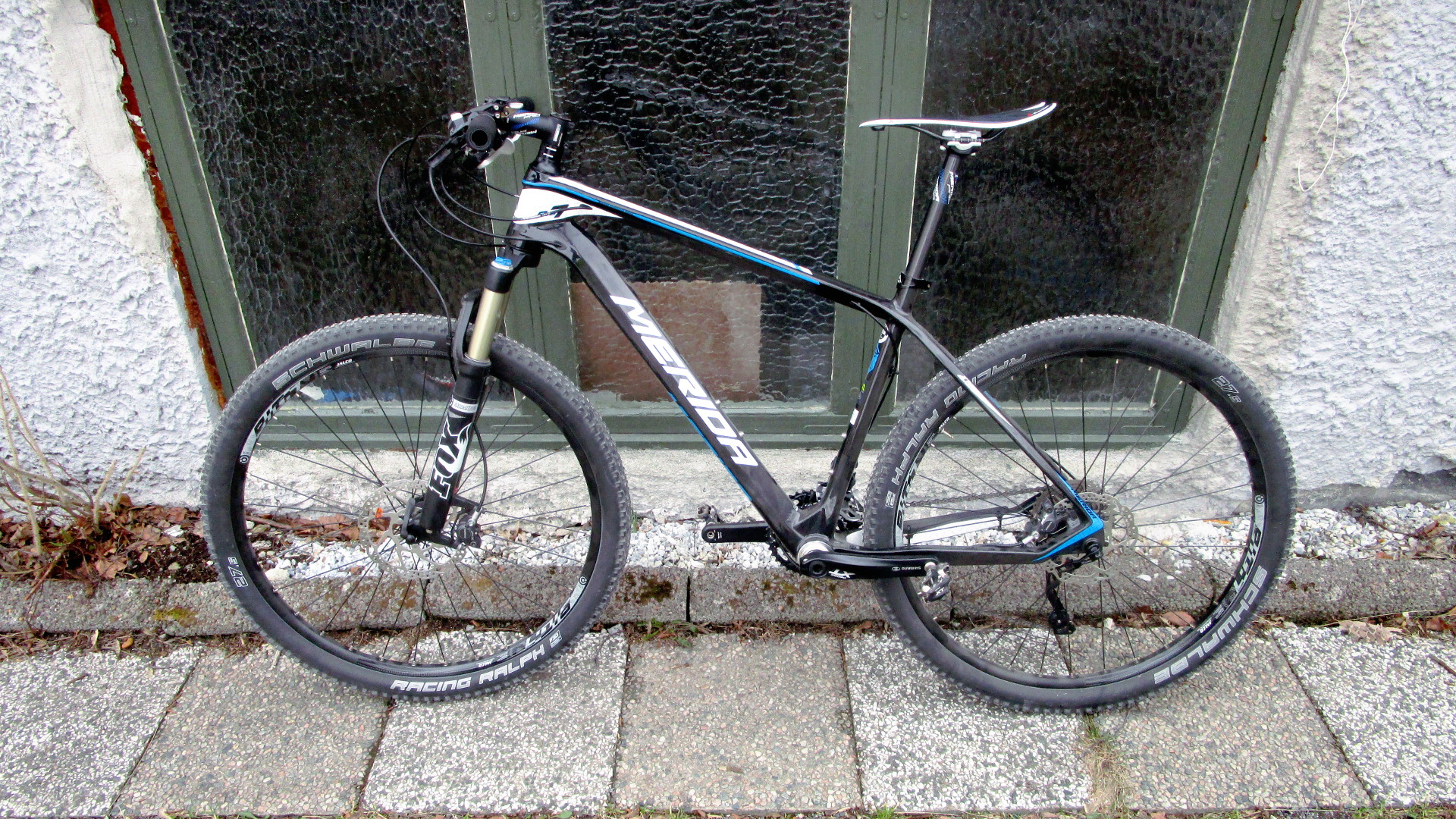
Merida Big Seven mountain bike with Schwalbe Racing Ralph 27.5" tires

27.5 mountain bikes are mountain bikes which use a large volume tire that is approximately 27.5 inches in diameter, 56 mm wide (ISO 56-584 / 27.5 × 2.25) on an ISO 584 mm rim. 27.5 mountain bikes are also called tweeners, since it "fits between" the traditional 26-inch wheels and the newer 29ers.

Names for the wheel size other than the ISO designated 56-584 are 27.5" and 650B, both considered controversial marketing terms. The wheel's diameter is smaller than "27-inch" (630mm ISO) size found on older road bicycles and the 650B size has traditionally been a designation for a 26 inch diameter (ISO ~ 40-584 demi-ballon tire) using the same ISO 584 mm rim with narrower tires, used by French tandems, Porteurs and touring bicycles.

The 27.5 inch are seen as a compromise between the two existing standards of the original 26 inch (ISO 559 mm rim) and recently emerged 29 inch (ISO 622 mm rim) mountain bikes (late 2000s).

== History ==
In 2007, 27.5 inch wheels for mountain bike use was pioneered by Kirk Pacenti as the optimal choice for full suspension mountain bikes, and in 2013 at least 10 companies had launched models with 27.5 inch wheels, with some parts manufacturers following suit.

In 2012, Nino Schurter won the World Cup event at Pietermaritzburg, South Africa, and placed second in the Olympics in 2012 on 27.5 inch wheels.

In 2022, author Paul Tuthill at Conquer The Bike stated that 27.5 inch wheels were "all but dead, [but] still remains on life support", with 29ers being more common for downhill and endurance riding, and 26ers being more popular for regular bike riding, mountain biking and dirt jumping.

== See also ==
- 29er mountain bike
- Mountain bike
- Downhill bike
- Glossary of cycling
- Outline of cycling
