= Bicycle and motorcycle geometry =

Collection of key measurements that define a particular bike configuration

Bike geometry parameters: wheelbase, steering axis angle, fork offset, and trail

Bicycle and motorcycle geometry is the collection of key measurements (lengths and angles) that define a particular bike configuration. Primary among these are wheelbase, steering axis angle, fork offset, and trail. These parameters have a major influence on how a bike handles.

== Wheelbase ==
The wheelbase is the horizontal distance between the centers (or the ground contact points) of the front and rear wheels.

Wheelbase has a major influence, along with the position of the center of mass of the combined bike and rider, on the longitudinal stability of a bike: a short wheelbase and high center of mass increase the likelihood of pitching over the front the rear wheel when braking, or lifting the front wheel off the ground when accelerating. Short bikes are much more suitable for performing wheelies and stoppies.

== Steering axis angle ==
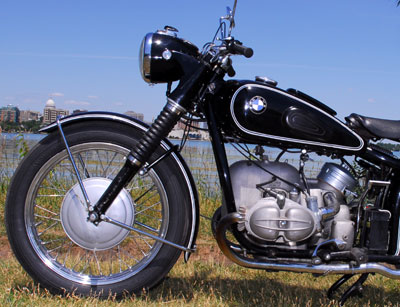
Telescopic forks on a BMW motorcycle reveal the steering axis angle, also called the rake angle

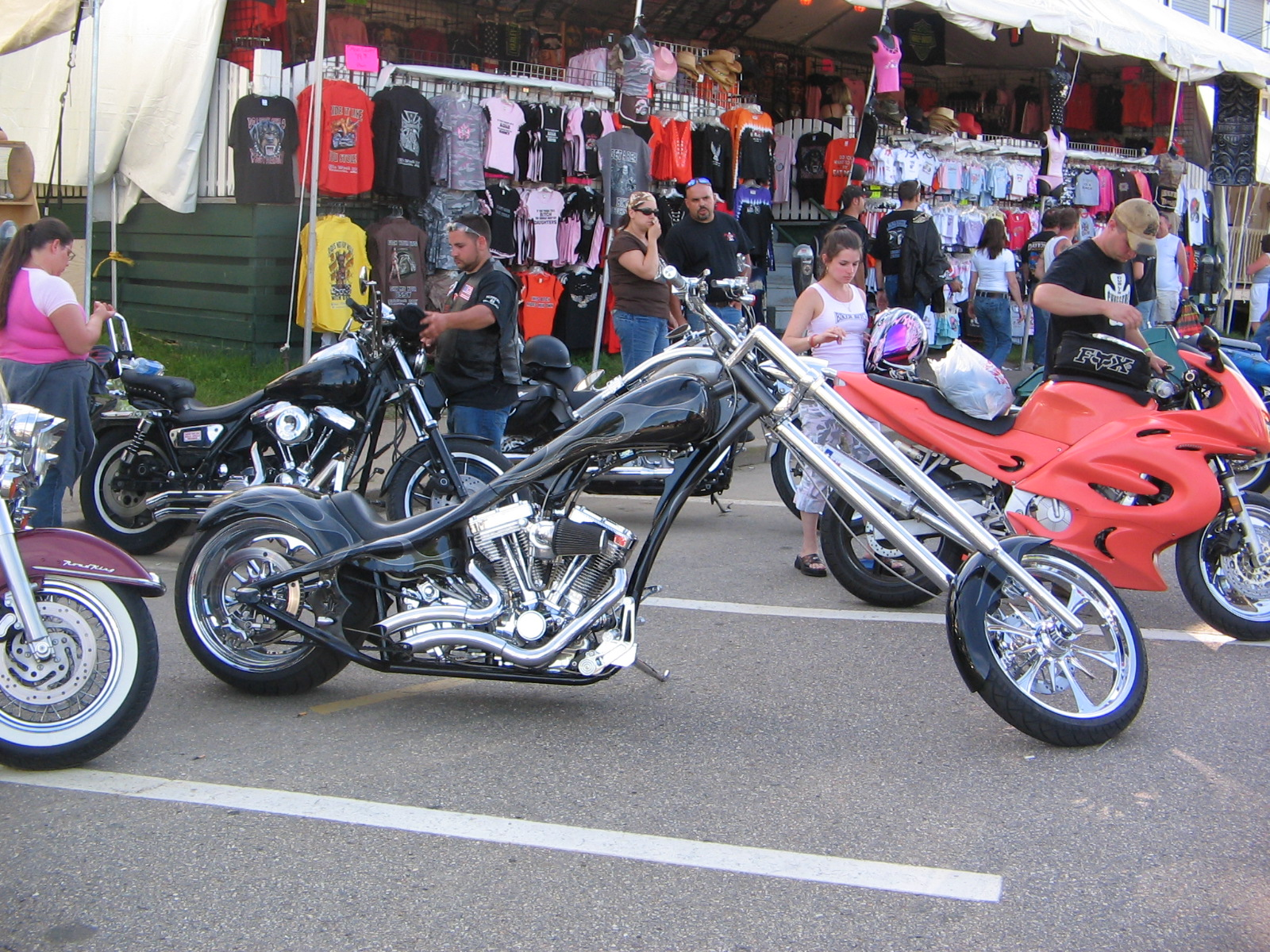
Example of a chopper with an unusually large rake angle

The steering axis angle is called caster angle when measured from vertical axis or head angle when measured from horizontal axis. The steering axis is the axis about which the steering mechanism (fork, handlebars, front wheel, etc.) pivots. The steering axis angle usually matches the angle of the head tube.

=== Bicycle head angle ===
In bicycles, the steering axis angle is measured from the horizontal and called the head angle; a 90° head angle would be vertical. For example, Lemond offers:

- a 2007 Filmore, designed for the track, with a head angle that varies from 72.5° to 74° depending on frame size
- a 2006 Tete de Course, designed for road racing, with a head angle that varies from 71.25° to 74°, depending on frame size.

Due to front fork suspension, modern mountain bikes—as opposed to road bikes—tend to have slacker head tube angles, generally around 70°, although they can be as low as 62° (depending on frame geometry setting).

At least one manufacturer, Cane Creek, offers an after-market threadless headset that enables changing the head angle.

=== Motorcycle rake angle ===
In motorcycles, the steering axis angle is measured from the vertical and called the caster angle, rake angle, or just rake; a 0° rake is therefore vertical. For example, Moto Guzzi offers:

- a 2007 Breva V 1100 with a rake of 25°30′ (25.5 degrees)
- a 2007 Nevada Classic 750 with a rake of 27.5°

== Fork offset ==
The fork offset is the perpendicular distance from the steering axis to the center of the front wheel.

In bicycles, fork offset is also called fork rake. Road racing bicycle forks have an offset of 40–50 mm (1.6–2.0 in).

The offset may be implemented by curving the forks, adding a perpendicular tab at their lower ends, offsetting the fork blade sockets of the fork crown ahead of the steerer, or by mounting the forks into the crown at an angle to the steer tube. The development of forks with curves is attributed to George Singer.

In motorcycles with telescopic fork tubes, fork offset can be implemented by either an offset in the triple tree, adding a triple tree rake (usually measured in degrees from 0) to the fork tubes as they mount into the triple tree, or a combination of the two. Other, less-common motorcycle forks, such as trailing link or leading link forks, can implement offset by the length of link arms.

== Fork length ==
The length of a fork is measured parallel to the steer tube from the lower fork crown bearing to the axle center.

== Trail ==
A diagram showing the effect of decreasing the head tube angle, the fork offset, or the wheel size (diameter) on the trail.

Animation showing how fork offset must change with changes in steering axis angle to keep trail constant.

Animation showing how fork offset must change as trail changes to keep steering axis angle constant.

Trail is the horizontal distance from where the front wheel touches the ground to where the steering axis intersects the ground. The measurement is considered positive if the front wheel ground contact point is behind (towards the rear of the bike) the steering axis intersection with the ground. Most bikes have positive trail, though a few, such as the two-mass-skate bicycle and the Python Lowracer, have negative trail.

Trail is often cited as an important determinant of bicycle handling characteristics, and is sometimes listed in bicycle manufacturers' geometry data. Wilson and Papodopoulos argue that mechanical trail may be a more important and informative variable, although both expressions describe very nearly the same thing.

Trail is a function of steering axis angle, fork offset, and wheel size. Their relationship can be described by this formula:
$$\text{Trail}_\text{bicycle} = \frac{R_w \cos(A_h) - O_f}{\sin(A_h)}$$
and
$$\text{Trail}_\text{motorcycle} = \frac{R_w \sin(A_r) - O_f}{\cos(A_r)}$$
where $R_w$ is wheel radius, $A_h$ is the bicycle head angle measured from the horizontal, $A_r$ is the motorcycle rake angle measured from the vertical, and $O_f$ is the fork offset. Trail can be increased by increasing the wheel size, decreasing or slackening the head angle, or decreasing the fork offset. Trail decreases as head angle increases (becomes steeper), as fork offset increases, or as wheel diameter decreases.

Motorcyclists tend to speak of trail in relation to rake angle. The larger the rake angle, the larger the trail. Note that, on a bicycle, as rake angle increases, head angle decreases.

Trail can vary as the bike leans or steers. In the case of traditional geometry, trail decreases (and wheelbase increases if measuring distance between ground contact points and not hubs) as the bike leans and steers in the direction of the lean. Trail can also vary as the suspension activates, in response to braking for example. As telescopic forks compress due to load transfer during braking, the trail and the wheelbase both decrease. At least one motorcycle, the MotoCzysz C1, has a fork with adjustable trail, from 89 to 101 mm [3.50 to 3.98 inches].

== Mechanical trail ==
Mechanical trail is the perpendicular distance between the steering axis and the point of contact between the front wheel and the ground. It may also be referred to as normal trail. In each case, its value is equal to the numerator in the expression for trail.
$$\text{Mechanical Trail}_\text{bicycle} = R_w \cos(A_h) - O_f,$$
and
$$\text{Mechanical Trail}_\text{motorcycle} = R_w \sin(A_r) - O_f$$

Although the scientific understanding of bicycle steering remains incomplete, we do have a good overall understanding of the interdependent dynamic complexities. Mechanical trail is certainly one of the most important variables in determining the handling characteristics of a bicycle. A trail of zero may give some advantages:

- the influence of the position of the center of pressure of wind forces coming from the side is eliminated
- the wheel flop effect (see below) is eliminated

Skilled and alert riders may have more path control if the mechanical trail is lower while a higher trail is known to make a bicycle easier to ride "no hands" and thus more subjectively stable.

== Wheel flop ==
Wheel flop refers to steering behavior in which a bicycle or motorcycle tends to turn more than expected due to the front wheel "flopping" over when the handlebars are rotated. Wheel flop is caused by the lowering of the front end of a bicycle or motorcycle as the handlebars are rotated away from the "straight ahead" position. This lowering phenomenon occurs according to the following equation:

$$f = b \sin\theta \cos \theta$$

where:

- $f$ = "wheel flop factor," the distance that the center of the front wheel axle is lowered when the handlebars are rotated from the straight ahead position to a position 90 degrees away from straight ahead
- $b$ = trail
- $\theta$ = head angle

Because wheel flop involves the lowering of the front end of a bicycle or motorcycle, the force due to gravity will tend to cause handlebar rotation to continue with increasing rotational velocity and without additional rider input on the handlebars. Once the handlebars are turned, the rider needs to apply torque to the handlebars to bring them back to the straight ahead position and bring the front end of the bicycle or motorcycle back up to the original height. The rotational inertia of the front wheel will lessen the severity of the wheel flop effect because it results in opposing torque being required to initiate or accelerate changing the direction of the front wheel.

According to the equation listed above, increasing the trail and/or decreasing the head angle will increase the wheel flop factor on a bicycle or motorcycle, which will increase the torque required to bring the handlebars back to the straight ahead position and increase the vehicle's tendency to veer suddenly off the line of a curve. Also, increasing the weight borne by the front wheel of the vehicle, either by increasing the mass of the vehicle, rider and cargo or by changing the weight ratio to shift the center of mass forward, will increase the severity of the wheel flop effect. Increasing the rotational inertia of the front wheel by increasing the speed of the vehicle and the rotational speed of the wheel will tend to counter the wheel flop effect.

A certain amount of wheel flop is generally considered to be desirable. Bicycle Quarterly magazine states, "A bike with too little wheel flop will be sluggish in its reactions to handlebar inputs. A bike with too much wheel flop will tend to veer off its line at low and moderate speeds."

== Modifications ==
Forks may be modified or replaced, thereby altering the geometry of the bike.

=== Changing fork length ===
Increasing the length of the fork, for example by switching from rigid to suspension, raises the front of a bicycle and thus decreases its head angle. Lengthening the fork would have the opposite effect on the rake of a motorcycle, since rake is measured in the opposite direction.

A rule of thumb is a 10 mm change in fork length gives a half-degree change in the steering axis angle.

=== Changing fork offset ===
Increasing the offset of a fork reduces the trail, and if performed on an existing fork by bending without lengthening the blades, shortens the fork.

== Legal requirements ==
The state of North Dakota (USA) has minimum and maximum requirements on rake and trail for "manufacture, sale, and safe operation of a motorcycle upon public highways."

4. All motorcycles, except three-wheel motorcycles, must meet the following specifications in relationship to front wheel geometry:

- MAXIMUM: Rake: 45 degrees; Trail: 14 inches [35.56 centimeters] positive
- MINIMUM: Rake: 20 degrees; Trail: 2 inches [5.08 centimeters] positive

Manufacturer's specifications must include the specific rake and trail for each motorcycle or class of motorcycles and the terms "rake" and "trail" must be defined by the director by rules adopted pursuant to chapter 28–32.

== Other aspects ==
For other aspects of geometry, such as ergonomics or intended use, see the bicycle frame article. For motorcycles the other main geometric parameters are seat height and relative foot peg and handlebar placement.

== See also ==
- Bicycle and motorcycle dynamics
- Bicycle fork
- Bicycle frame
- Hub-center steering
- Motorcycle fork
