= 29er (bicycle) =

Type of mountain bike

29ers or two-niners are mountain bikes and hybrid bikes that are built to use 700c or 622 mm ISO (inside rim diameter) wheels, commonly called 29″ wheels. Most mountain bikes once used ISO 559 mm wheels, commonly called 26″ wheels. The ISO 622 mm wheel is typically also used for road-racing, trekking, cyclo-cross, touring and hybrid bicycles. In some countries, mainly in Continental Europe, ISO 622 mm wheels are commonly called 28″ wheels or "28 Incher".

== Origins ==
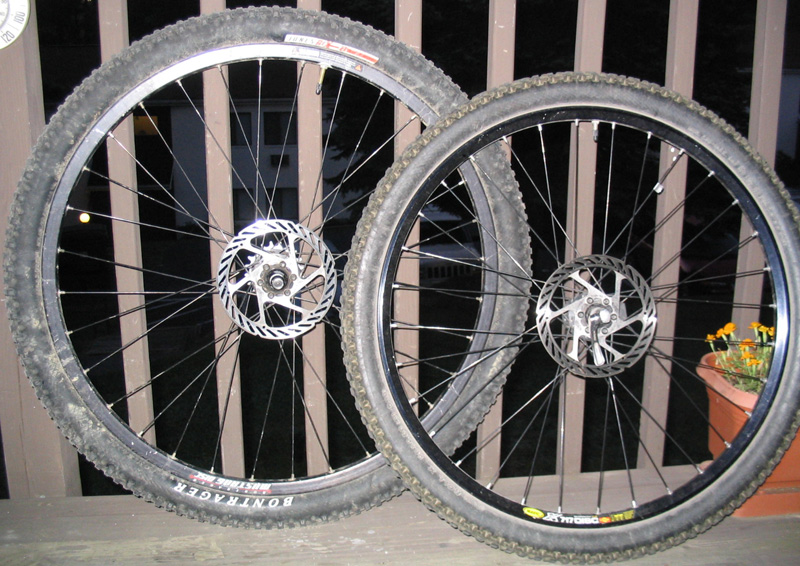
29″ and 26″ mountain bike wheels

29er rims have an interior diameter of 622 millimetres (24.5 in) and the average 29″ mountain bike tire is (in ISO notation) 59-622 – corresponding to an outside diameter of about 29.15 inches (740 mm). The typical 26″ MTB tire has a rim diameter of 559 millimetres (22.0 in) and an outside tire diameter of about 26 inches (660 mm).

In the early 1980s, the size of the wheels for the emerging mountain bikes was undecided. So when English off-road cycling pioneer Geoff Apps contacted Gary Fisher and Charlie Kelly with news that he had built a prototype off-road bicycle that used large-diameter 28 × 1¾ (ISO 47-622), 47mm wide Nokian Hakkapeliitta snow tires from Finland, they were intrigued. In a letter to the December 2006 issue of Bike Biz magazine, Gary Fisher, speaking about the growing popularity of 29ers, gives his perspective: "We got some tires from Geoff Apps really early on and we [Fisher and Kelly] said 'Holy Toledo!'" But the poor supply situation of the larger diameter tires meant the fledgling MTB industry stuck with the smaller wheel size." The first Geoff Apps-designed 700C wheeled off-road bicycle was made in 1981.

However the bicycle marketed as the Aventura by Apps' own company, Cleland Cycles Ltd, between 1982 and 1984 used the more readily available Nokian Hakkapeliitta 26 × 2 (ISO 54-584). The 650B size, also known as 27.5″, reappeared in 2007 as a compromise between the 26 inch and 29 inch sizes. The 650B size is called 27.5″.

The name "29er" comes from a bicycle called the Two Niner, which was offered by the Fisher bike company in 2001, according to 1998 Mountain Bike Hall of Fame inductee Don Cook.

The US division of Bianchi Bicycles offered a line of 29″ wheeled off-road bikes beginning in 1991 called the Project bikes. Their 1992 product catalog raved about the advantages of the larger wheels and showed three different bikes, the Project 3, 5 and 7. Likewise, in 1991 Panaracer developed a 700c version of the Smoke Tire for OEM use on the Diamondback Overdrive and Overdrive Comp mountain bikes. The original company Klein produced a small quantity of a 29″ wheeled version of their successful "Attitude" MTB racer, and named it the Adept. It failed to find a market and was discontinued.

A key product release, the first true 29″ tire, was produced by an early supporter of the 29″ movement Wilderness Trail Bikes. The company introduced the first true 29″ tire, the Nanoraptor, in 1999. At about the same time, White Brothers produced the first commercially available 29″ suspension forks. Before then suspension forks used were forks designed for trekking bikes or hybrids. For many years, 29″ frames and bikes were usually only available from small little-known manufactures like Niner Bikes. Surly Bikes introduced their 29″ frameset, the Karate Monkey, in 2002. Gary Fisher Bicycles, a division of Trek Bicycles, became the first of the major manufactures to offer a line of 29″ bikes. Their lines never sold well until the introduction of single-speed 29″ bike the Rig, in 2004. Today, most bicycle manufacturers in the US market offer at least one 29″ bicycle or frame.

== Cyclocross comparison ==
A tire with a tread width of less than 2.0 in (51 mm) in width is sometimes considered a cyclocross tire by 29″ enthusiasts, even though in cyclocross any tire wider than 1.5 in (38 mm) is not a cyclocross tire. Although they are both intended for off-road use, and typically use a 622 mm rim, cyclocross bikes and 29″ wheeled MTBs differ in their basic handling and geometry, construction methods, durability, and intended lifespan. Bikes exist that blur the distinction by combining attributes of both, however. One example of this is a Monstercross bike, often using a standard mountain bike frame intended for use with 26″ wheels with 700c wheels and 700 × 38c-45c tires, disc or cantilever brakes, MTB or cross gearing, and the drop bars of a cyclocross bike.

== Performance ==
The advantages and disadvantages of 29ers are often debated in the mountain bike community. Disadvantages of the 29″ wheel include added weight, perceived sluggishness in handling, and problems with fit (specifically, front wheel/toe overlap and high standover height). Advantages include reduced rolling resistance, perceived increased stability while retaining quick handling, and an enhanced ability to roll over obstacles.

One item that is often raised is tire contact patch size and shape. All else being equal, such as tire width, rim width, inflation pressure and rider weight, the contact patch of a 29″ wheel has the same area and is slightly longer (~5%) than that of a 26″ wheel.

=== Advantages ===
- Larger wheels roll over obstacles more easily. The ability of a wheel to roll over obstacles is proportional to its size. A 29″ wheel, which is about 10% larger than a 26″ wheel, can roll over 10% larger obstacles.
- The larger diameter wheels have more angular momentum so they lose less speed to obstacles and rough sections.
- 29″ bikes tend to offer taller riders a more "natural" frame geometry
- Larger diameter, wider tires with higher air pressure flatten less near the ground contact area.
- All spokes are adjusted to the same high tension forces. For bicycles with a rider, as the wheel rolls around, the tension of all the spokes does not increase significantly; instead, only the spokes directly under the hub decrease their tension. For tires that flatten less under loads, the spokes directly under the hub decrease their tension less, so the spokes are exposed to more consistent tension. The spokes survive longer before breaking by fatigue failure.

Most of these claims have yet to be objectively investigated. Small scale, unpublished studies (including one done by Pepperdine University, reportedly at the request of Gary Fisher) exist but both proponents and detractors of 29″ wheels are generally unimpressed with their scientific rigor. Long debates over how to conduct a "fair" test of the efficiency of 29″ vs 26″ mountain bikes have raged online, but no serious efforts have been made to conduct a large-scale, scientific study.

=== Drawbacks ===
- Increased wheel weight (larger tire, tube, rim, and spokes) makes the wheels slower to respond to acceleration and braking, and adds to unsprung mass.
- Longer spokes and decreased angle between hub flange and rim result in a more laterally flexible wheel (all else being equal).
- Less responsive handling because of longer wheelbase and heavier front wheel.
- Smaller riders (i.e., less than 5′5″ (=165 cm) tall) may face significant geometry tradeoffs, possibly resulting in toe overlap, high handlebar height, and less standover clearance.

== 96 or 69 variations ==
One variation is to have a 29″ front wheel and a 26″ rear wheel (commonly called a "96er"). Using the smaller rear wheel allows shorter and quicker handling frames, more options for rear suspension designs and lighter bicycle weight. Another variation is to have a 26″ front wheel with a 29″ rear wheel (commonly called a "69er" though Trek introduced a "69er" in 2007 with a 29″ front wheel and a 26″ rear wheel).

== See also ==
- 27.5 Mountain bike
- Mountain bike
- Downhill bike
- Glossary of cycling
- Outline of cycling
