= Mountain bike =

Type of bicycle

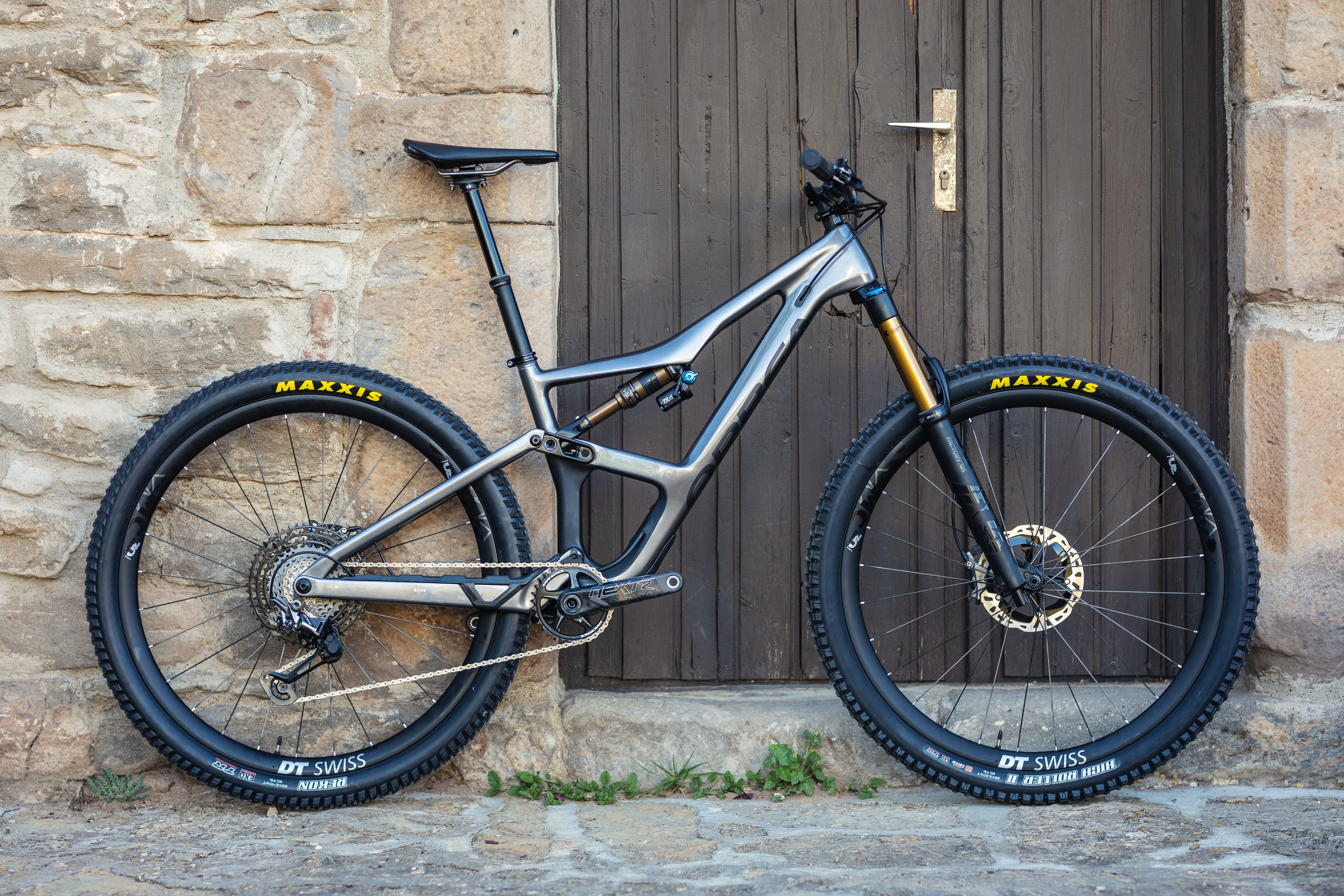
2020 full suspension mountain bike

A mountain bike (MTB) or mountain bicycle is a bicycle designed for off-road cycling (mountain biking). Mountain bikes share some similarities with other bicycles, but incorporate features designed to enhance durability and performance in rough terrain, which often makes them heavier, more complex and less efficient on smooth surfaces. These typically include a suspension fork, large knobby tires, more durable wheels, more powerful brakes, straight, wide handlebars to improve balance and comfort over rough terrain, and wide-ratio gearing optimized for topography, application (e.g., steep climbing or fast descending) and a frame with a suspension mechanism for the rear wheel. Rear suspension is ubiquitous in heavier-duty bikes and now common even in lighter bikes. Dropper seat posts can be installed to allow the rider to quickly adjust the seat height (an elevated seat position is more effective for pedaling, but poses a hazard in aggressive maneuvers).

Mountain bikes are generally specialized for use on mountain trails, single track, fire roads, and other unpaved surfaces. In addition to being used to travel and recreate on those surfaces, many people use mountain bikes primarily on paved surfaces; some may prefer the upright position, plush ride, and stability that mountain bikes often have. Mountain biking terrain commonly has rocks, roots, loose dirt, and steep grades. Many trails have additional technical trail features (TTF) such as log piles, log rides, rock gardens, skinnies, gap jumps, and wall-rides. Mountain bikes are built to handle these types of terrain and features. The heavy-duty construction combined with stronger rims and wider tires has also made this style of bicycle popular with urban riders and couriers who must navigate through potholes and over curbs.

Since the start of the sport in the 1970s, many new subtypes of mountain biking have been developed, such as cross-country (XC), trail, all-mountain, enduro, freeride, downhill, and a variety of track and slalom types. Each of these place different demands on the bike, requiring different designs for optimal performance. MTB development has led to an increase in suspension travel, now often up to 8 inches (200 mm), and gearing up to 13 speed, to facilitate both climbing and rapid descents. Advances in gearing have also led to the ubiquity of "1x" drivetrains (pronounced "one-by"), simplifying the gearing to one chainring in the front and a wide range cassette at the rear, typically with 9 to 12 sprockets. 1x gearing reduces overall bike weight, increases ground clearance, and greatly simplifies the process of gear selection, but 2- or 3-ring drivetrains are still common on entry-level bikes.

The expressions "all terrain bicycle", "all terrain bike", and the acronym "ATB" are used as synonyms for "mountain bike", but some authors consider them passé.

== History ==
=== Origins ===
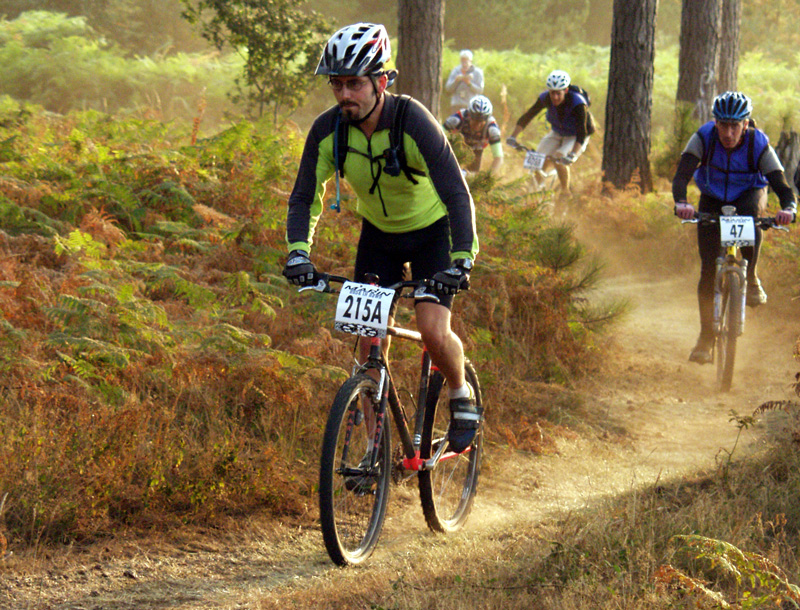
A cross country mountain bike race.

The original mountain bikes were modified heavy cruiser bicycles used for freewheeling down mountain trails. The sport became popular in the 1970s in Northern California, US, with riders using older, single-speed balloon tire bicycles to ride down rugged hillsides. These modified bikes were called "ballooners" in California, "klunkers" in Colorado, and "dirt bombers" in Oregon. Joe Breeze, a bicycle frame builder, used this idea and developed what is considered the first mountain bike.

Road bicycle companies did not manufacture mountain bicycles using high-tech lightweight materials like M4 aluminum until the late 1970s and early 1980s. The first production mountain bike available was the 1979 Lawwill Pro Cruiser. The frame design was based on a frame that Don Koski fabricated from electrical conduit and a Schwinn Varsity frame. Mert Lawwill had Terry Knight of Oakland build the frames. The bikes sold for about $500 new and were made from 1979 through 1980 (approximate run of 600 bikes).

The first mass production mountain bike was the Specialized Stumpjumper, first produced in 1981. With the rising popularity of mountain bikes, Randolph (Randy) Ross, executive vice president of Ross Bicycles Inc., was quoted in the New York Times saying I'd say these bikes are one of the biggest things that ever happened to the biking industry. Its basic look constitutes "a total shift in image" for the industry.

Throughout the 1990s and 2000s, mountain biking moved from a little-known sport to a mainstream activity complete with an international racing circuit and a world championship, in addition to various free ride competitions, such as the FMB World Tour and the Red Bull Rampage.

== Designs ==
Mountain bikes can usually be divided into four broad categories based on suspension configuration:

- Rigid: A mountain bike with large, knobby tires and straight handlebars, but with neither front nor rear suspension.
- Hardtail: A mountain bike equipped with a suspension fork for the front wheel, but otherwise a rigid frame.
- Soft tail: A recent addition, a mountain bike with pivots in the frame but no rear shock. The flex of the frame absorbs some vibrations. These bikes are usually cross-country bikes.
- Full suspension (or dual suspension): A mountain bike equipped with both front and rear suspension. The front suspension is usually a telescopic fork similar to that of a motorcycle, and the rear is suspended by a mechanical linkage with components for absorbing shock.

== Modern designs ==
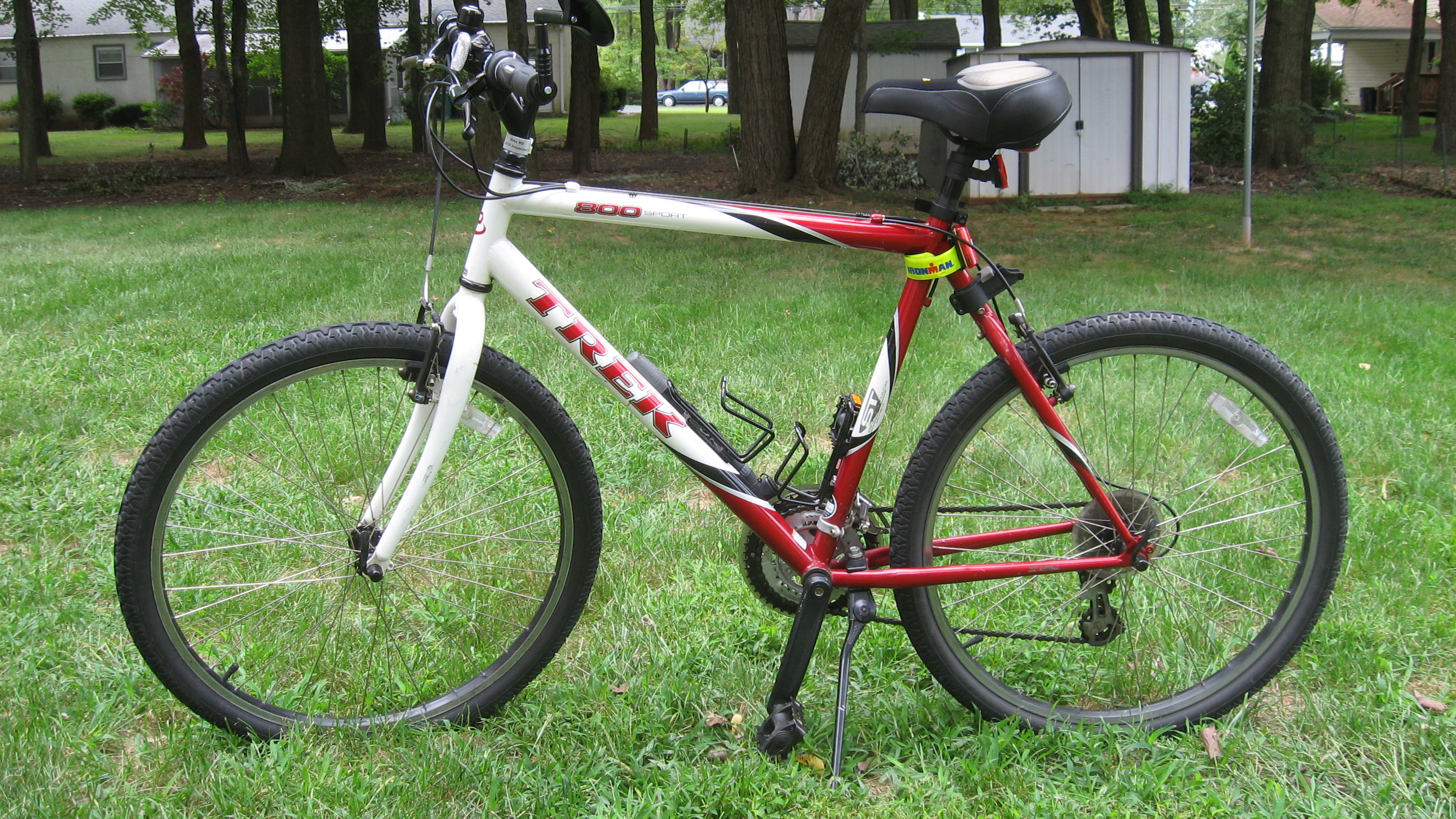
A 2002 bike

=== Gears ===
Since the 1980s, mountain bikes have had anywhere from 7 to 36 speeds, with 1 to 4 chain-rings on the crankset and 5 to 12 sprockets in the cogset. 30-speed, 33-speed and 36-speed mountain bikes were originally found to be unworkable, as the mud-shedding capabilities of a 10-speed, 11-speed or 12-speed cassette, and the intricacies of a 10-speed, 11-speed or 12-speed rear derailleur were originally not found to be suitable combined with front shifters, although 10, 11 and 12 speed cassettes are now commonplace in single front chainring bicycles, and are also found on some mountain bikes. However, many pro-level mountain bikers have taken to using a narrower 10-speed road chain with a 9-speed setup in an effort to reduce the weight of their bike. In early 2009, component group SRAM announced their release of their XX groupset, which uses a 2-speed front derailleur, and a 10-speed rear derailleur and cassette, similar to that of a road bike. Mud-shedding capabilities of their 10-speed XX cassette are made suitable for MTB use by extensive machining of the cassette. Due to the time and cost involved in such a product, they were only aimed at top-end XC-racers. However, 10-speed has become the norm by 2011 and the market leader Shimano even offers its budget groupset "Alivio" in a 10-speed version. In July 2012, SRAM announced a 1×11 drivetrain called XX1 that does not make use of a front derailleur for lighter weight and simplicity. In the 2014 Commonwealth Games at Glasgow all leading riders used 1×11 drivetrains. SRAM's new 1×12 gearing was introduced in 2016 as SRAM Eagle. This gives a single chain ring bike better ability to climb.

=== Geometry ===
The critical angles in bicycle geometry are the head angle (the angle of the head tube), and the seat tube angle (the angle of the seat tube). These angles are measured from the horizontal, and drastically affect the rider position and performance characteristics of the bicycle. Mountain bike geometry will often feature a seat tube angle around 73 degrees, with a head tube angle of anywhere from 60 to 73 degrees. The intended application of the bike affects its geometry very heavily. In general, steeper angles (closer to 90 degrees from the horizontal) are more efficient for pedaling up hills and make for sharper handling. Slacker angles (leaning farther from the vertical) are preferred for high speeds and downhill stability.

=== Suspension ===
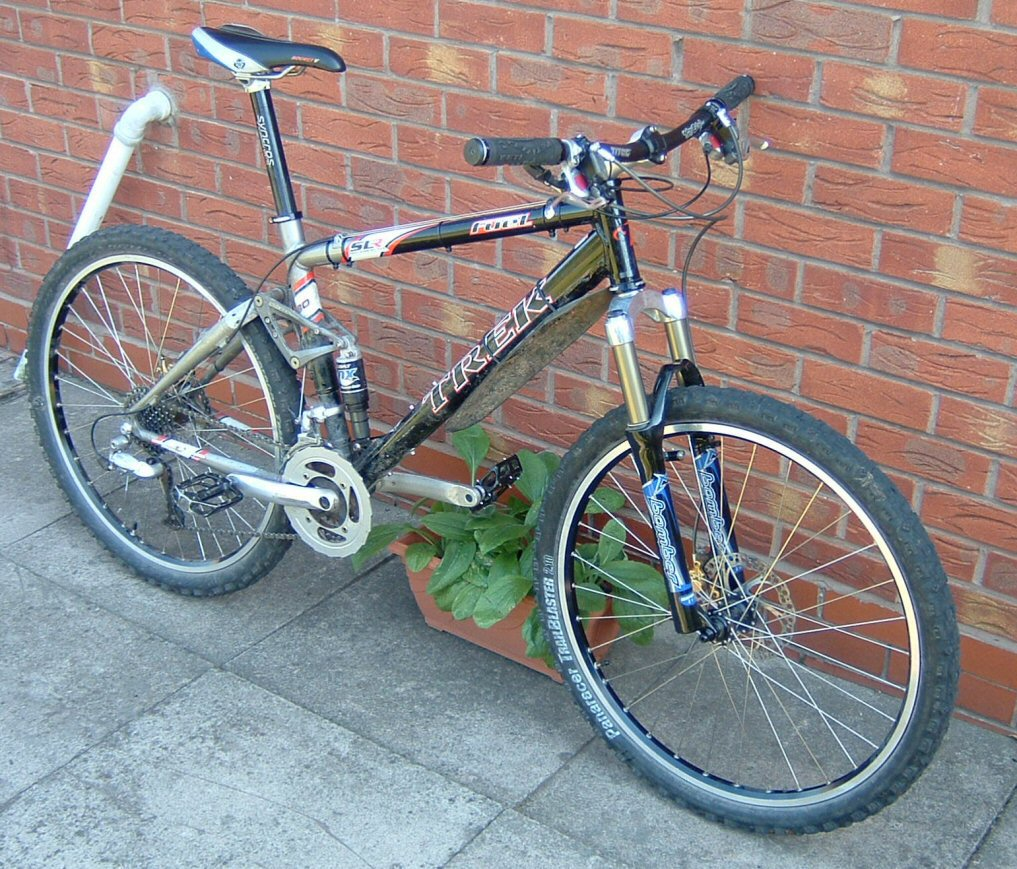
A full suspension mountain bike

In the past mountain bikes had a rigid frame and fork. In the early 1990s, the first mountain bikes with suspension forks were introduced. This made riding on rough terrain easier and less physically stressful. The first front suspension forks had about 1 1/2 to 2 inches (38 to 50 mm) of suspension travel. Once suspension was introduced, bikes with front suspension and rigid, non-suspended rear wheels, or "hardtails", became popular nearly overnight. While the hardtail design has the benefits of lower cost, less maintenance, and better pedaling efficiency, it is slowly losing popularity due to improvements in full suspension designs. Front fork suspensions are now available with 8 inches (200 mm) of travel or more (see above under Designs.)

Many new mountain bikes integrate a "full suspension" design known as dual suspension, meaning that both the front and rear wheel are fitted with a shock absorber in some form as the wheel attaches to the bike. This provides a smoother ride as the front and rear wheels can now travel up and down to absorb the force of obstacles striking the tires. Dual suspension bikes of a similar quality are considerably more expensive, heavier, and less efficient when pedaling, but are much faster on downhill and technical/rough sections than other mountain bikes. This is because, when a wheel strikes an obstacle, its tendency is to bounce up; this redirects some forward momentum, resulting in a loss of speed. Dual suspension bikes solve this problem by absorbing this upward force and transmitting it into the shocks of the front and rear wheels, drastically decreasing the translation of forward momentum into upward movement.

=== Disc brakes ===
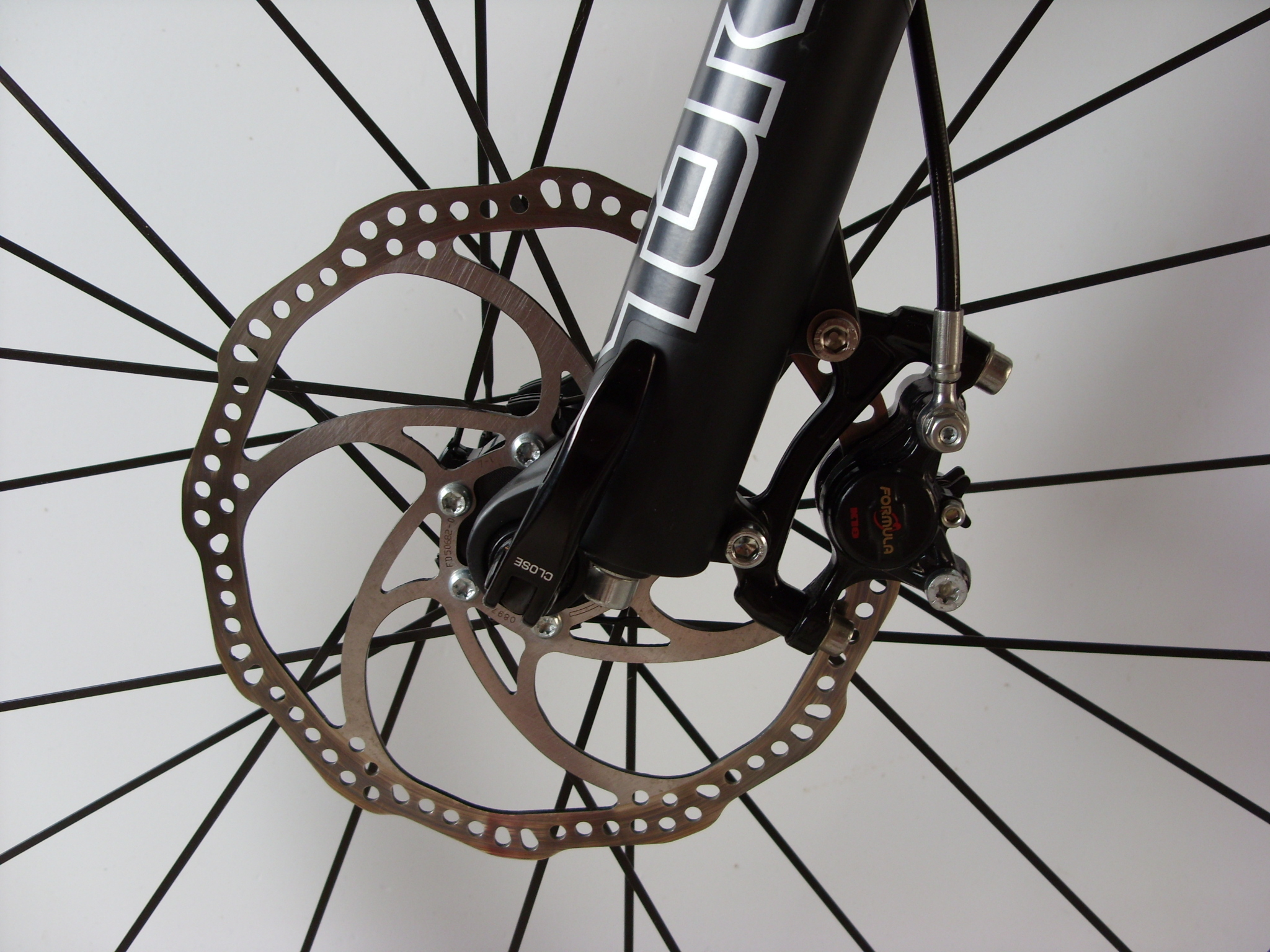
A front disc brake, mounted to the fork and hub

Most modern mountain bikes use disc brakes. They offer considerably improved stopping power (less lever pressure is required providing greater braking modulation) over rim brakes under all conditions especially adverse conditions, because they are located at the center of the wheel (on the wheel hub). They therefore remain drier and cleaner than wheel rims, which are more readily soiled or damaged. The disadvantage of disc brakes is their increased cost and often greater weight. Disc brakes do not allow heat to build up in the tires on long descents; instead, heat builds up in the rotor, which can become extremely hot.

There are two main types of mountain bike disc brakes: mechanical disc brakes and hydraulic disc brakes.

Mechanical disc brakes use a brake cable housed in a brake housing, which connects the brake lever to the brake caliper. When the lever is pulled, it tightens the cable, which in turn actuates the caliper and presses the brake pads against the rotor.

Hydraulic disc brakes, on the other hand, use a sealed hydraulic system instead of a cable. When the brake lever is pulled, it pressurizes the incompressible brake fluid (typically mineral oil or DOT fluid), which forces the brake pistons to move the pads against the rotor. Hydraulic systems generally provide stronger and more consistent braking performance compared to mechanical brakes.

== Wheel and tire design ==
Typical features of a mountain bike are very wide tires. The original 26-inch (660 mm) wheel diameter with approximately 2.125-inch (54.0 mm) width (ISO 559 mm rim diameter) is increasingly being displaced by 29-inch (740 mm) wheels with 2.35-inch (60 mm) width (ISO 622 mm rim diameter), as well as the 27.5-inch (700 mm) wheel diameter with 2.25-inch (57 mm) widths (ISO 584 mm rim diameter), particularly on smaller frame sizes for shorter riders. Mountain bikes with 24-inch (610 mm) wheels are also available, sometimes for dirt jumping, or as a junior bike.

Bicycle wheel sizes are not precise measurements: a 29-inch (740 mm) mountain bike wheel with a 24.5-inch (622 mm) bead seat diameter (the term, bead seat diameter (BSD), is used in the ETRTO tire and rim sizing system), and the average 29-inch (740 mm) mountain bike tire is (in ISO notation) 59-622 corresponds to an outside diameter of about 29.15 inches (740 mm).

24.5-inch (622 mm) wheels are standard on road bikes and are commonly known as 700C. In some countries, mainly in Continental Europe, 700C (622 mm) wheels are commonly called 28-inch wheels. 24-inch (610 mm) wheels are used for dirt jumping bikes and sometimes on freeride bikes, rear wheel only, as this makes the bike more maneuverable. 29-inch (740 mm) wheels were once used for only cross country purposes, but are now becoming more commonplace in other disciplines of mountain biking. A mountain bike with 29-inch wheels is often referred to as a 29er, and a bike with 27.5-inch wheels is called a 27.5 Mountain bike or as a marketing term ″650B bike".

Wheels come in a variety of widths, ranging from standard rims suitable for use with tires in the 1.90 to 2.10 in (48 to 53 mm) size, to 2.35 and 3.00 in (60 and 76 mm) widths popular with freeride and downhill bicycles. Although heavier wheelsets are favored in the freeride and downhill disciplines, advances in wheel technology continually shave weight off strong wheels. This is highly advantageous as rolling weight greatly affects handling and control, which are very important to the technical nature of freeride and downhill riding.

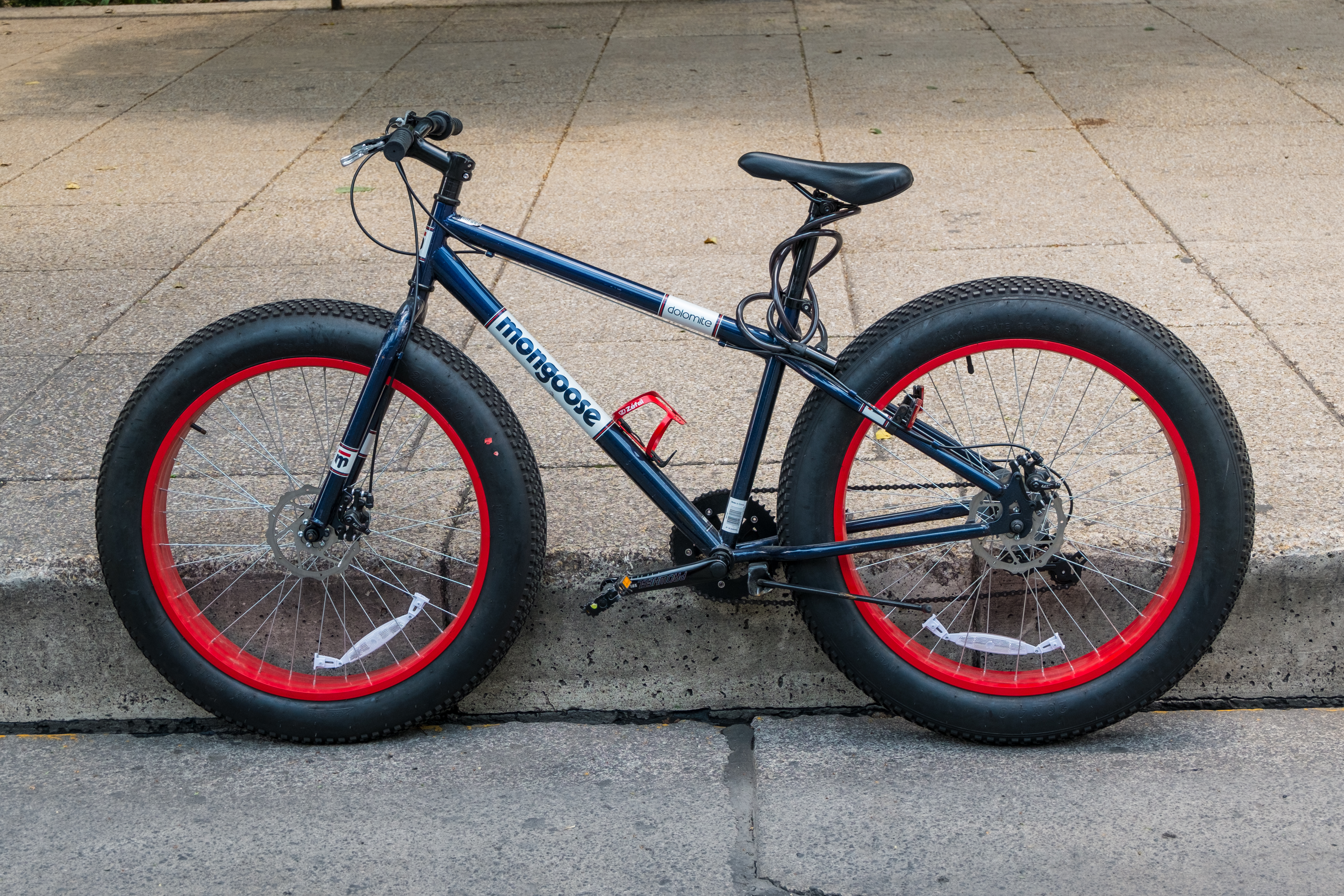
A Mongoose Dolomite fat tire bicycle

The widest wheel/tire widths, typically 3.8 inches (97 mm) or larger, are sometimes used by icebikers who use their mountain bikes for winter-time riding in snowy conditions.

Manufacturers produce bicycle tires with a wide variety of tread patterns to suit different needs. Among these styles are: slick street tires, street tires with a center ridge and outer tread, fully knobby, front-specific, rear-specific, and snow studded. Some tires can be specifically designed for use in certain weather (wet or dry) and terrain (hard, soft, muddy, etc.) conditions. Other tire designs attempt to be all-around applicable. Within the same intended application, more expensive tires tend to be lighter and have less rolling resistance. Sticky rubber tires are now available for use on freeride and downhill bikes. While these tires wear down more quickly, they provide greater traction in all conditions, especially during cornering. Tires and rims are available in either tubed or tubeless designs, with tubeless tires recently (2004) gaining favor for their pinch flat resistance.

Tires also come with tubes, tubeless and tubeless-ready. Tires with tubes are the standard design and the easiest to use and maintain. Tubeless tires are significantly lighter and often have better performance because you can run them at a lower tire pressure which results in better traction and increasing rolling resistance. Tubeless-ready tires are tires that can use tubes or go tubeless. A liquid sealant is used without the tube to secure the seal to the rim. Popular tire manufacturers include Wilderness Trail Bikes, Schwalbe, Maxxis, Nokian, Michelin, Continental, Tioga, Kenda, Hutchinson, Specialized and Panaracer.

== Tandems ==
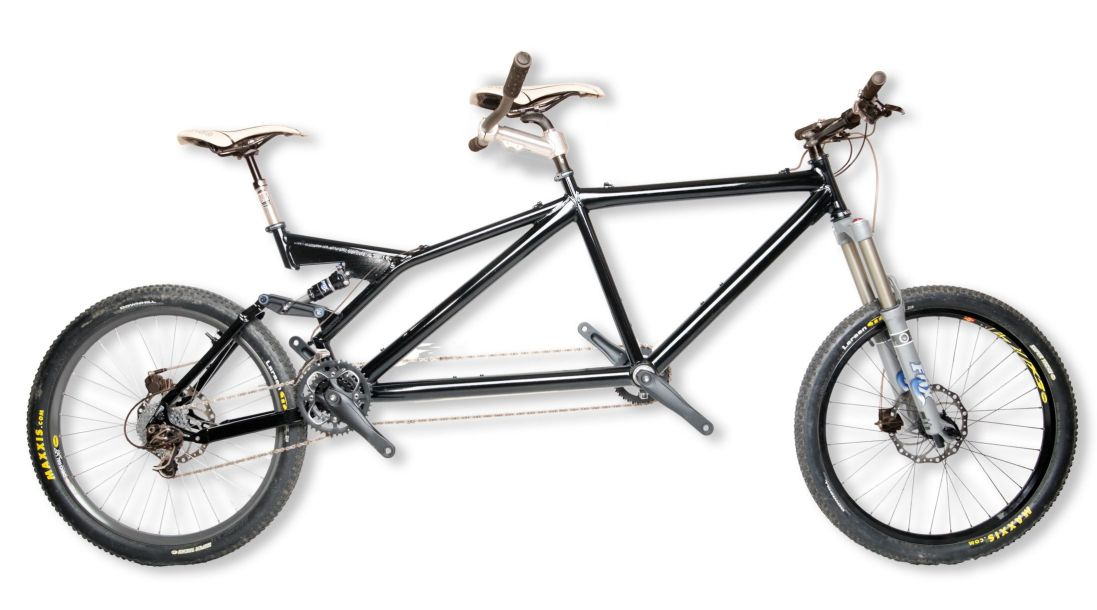
A tandem, full-suspension mountain bike

Mountain bikes are available in tandem configurations. For example, Cannondale and Santana Cycles offer ones without suspension, while Ellsworth, Nicolai, and Ventana manufacture tandems with full suspension.

== Electric mountain bike (eMTB) ==
A variety of electric mountain bikes on display in 2025, showing their typical design.

Many manufacturers make both traditional and electric mountain bikes. Most electric bikes designed for mountain biking include a mid-drive motor (between the pedals), a battery in the down tube, as well as a small display and mode controller.

== Adaptive mountain bike (aMTB) ==
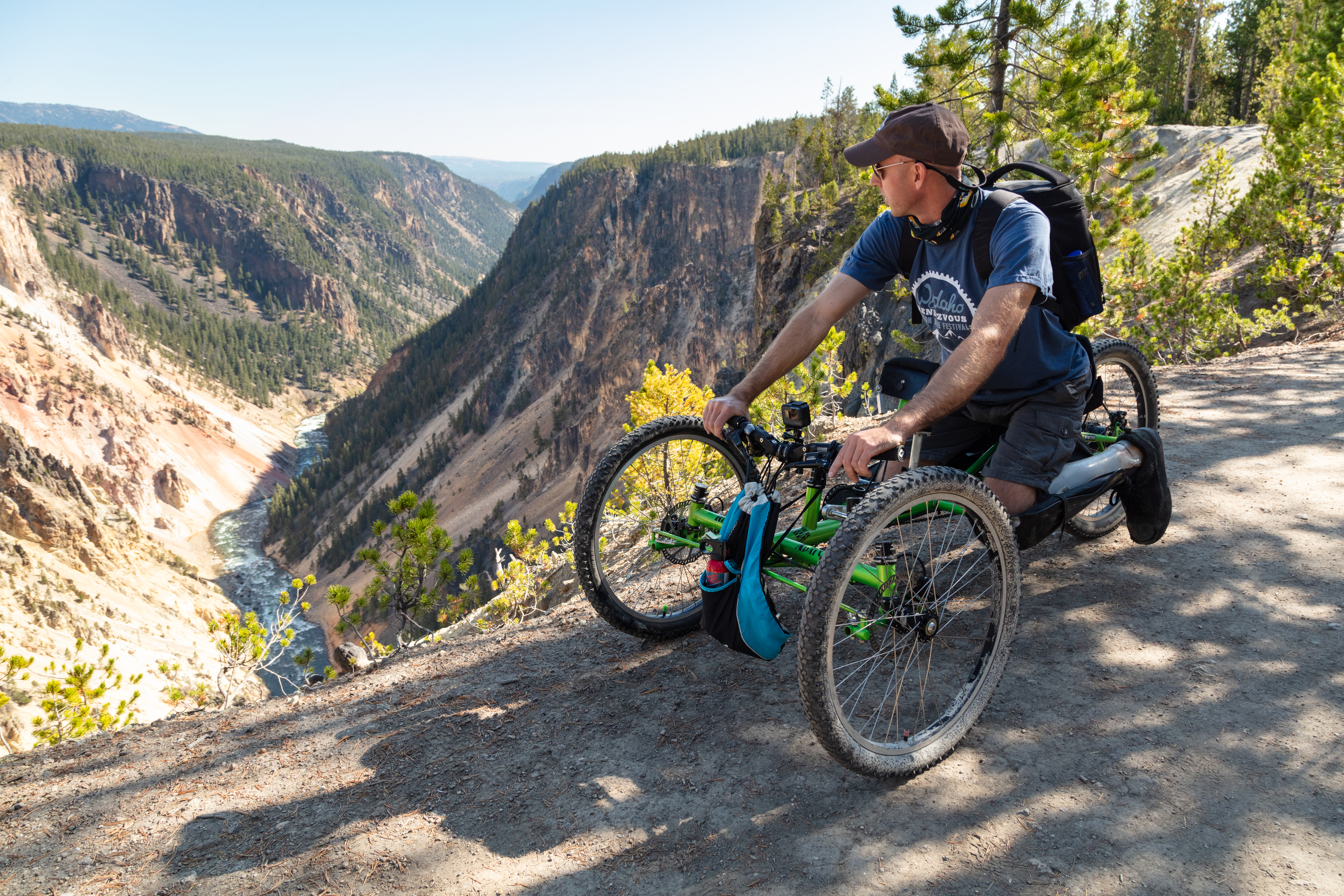
A type of mountain bike, or mountain trike, designed to function as an all-terrain wheelchair

MTB that has specialised equipment or is modified to make it accessible to individuals with varying mobility requirements. It can be two-wheeled, three-wheeled or four-wheeled. It can also have electrical motor assistance.

== Vintage MTB Day ==
Vintage MTB Day is an event or gathering where enthusiasts celebrate and ride classic, older mountain bikes (MTBs). The occasion typically features bicycles from the 1970s, 1980s, and early 1990s, showcasing the evolution of mountain bike technology and design. The event was established to honor and recognize the pioneers of mountain biking.

Held every 13 August in cities and countries around the world, Vintage MTB Day is open to participants of all backgrounds and encourages community involvement through group rides, exhibitions, and discussions of vintage bicycle culture.

=== Celebration ===
Across different countries, Vintage MTB Day is marked by events focused on classic mountain bikes. Common activities include:

- Fun Ride & Retro Gathering – group rides where participants use vintage MTBs and wear retro cycling gear.
- Bike Exhibitions – collectors display frames, components, and accessories such as cantilever brakes, thumb shifters, and semi-slick tires from the 1980s.
- Workshops & Talks – sessions on restoring old bikes, mountain biking history, and maintaining classic components.
- Social Media Campaigns – sharing photos or videos of vintage MTBs with the hashtag #VintageMTBDay.

=== Significance and Impact ===
Beyond nostalgia, the celebration promotes sustainability by encouraging the restoration and continued use of older bicycles. Vintage MTB Day inspires a new generation of cyclists to learn about mountain biking history, reduce waste through refurbishing, and preserve cycling culture across generations.

== See also ==
- Bicycle
- Electric bicycle
- Bicycle gearing
- Bicycle suspension
- Downhill mountain biking
- Enduro (mountain biking)
- Cross-country cycling
- Freeride mountain-biking movies
- Glossary of cycling
- International Mountain Bicycling Association
- List of bicycle manufacturers
- List of bicycle parts
- Mountain bike racing
- Mountain bike orienteering
- Mountain biking
- Mountain quadracycle
- Mountain unicycling
- National Off-Road Bicycle Association (NORBA)
- Singletrack
- Transrockies
- Cross triathlon
- Mountain Bike Hall of Fame
- UCI Mountain Bike & Trials World Championships
