= Head tube =

Bicycle part

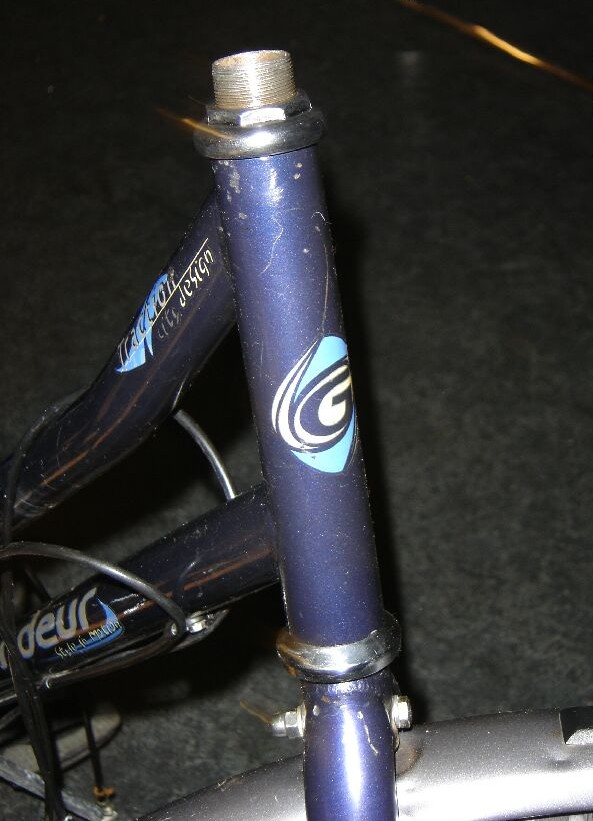
A bicycle head tube with a partially installed bicycle headset; the locknut has yet to be fitted onto the fork steerer tube.

The head tube is the part of a cycle's tubular frame within which the front fork steerer tube is mounted. On a motorcycle, the "head tube" is normally called the steering head. On bicycles the manufacturer's brand located on the head tube is known as a head badge.

== Bearings ==
The head tube holds the bearings which allow the front fork steerer tube to pivot freely.

- In bicycles, these bearings are collectively called the headset. These are usually ball bearings, although some headsets use needle bearings.
- In motorcycles, these bearings are also referred to as headset, or steering head bearings or steering neck bearings. These are usually tapered roller bearings.

== Caster angle ==
The steering axis angle, also called caster angle, is the angle that the head tube and hence the steering axis makes with the horizontal or vertical, depending on convention. The steering axis is the axis about which the steering mechanism (fork, handlebars, front wheel, etc.) pivots.

- In bicycles, the steering axis angle is called the head angle and is measured clock-wise from the horizontal when viewed from the right side. A 90° head angle would be vertical. Some examples of caster angles are:
  - 72.5° to 74° on the track bicycle 2007 Lemond Filmore, designed for the track (angle varies depending on frame size)
  - 71.25° to 74° on the road bicycle 2006 Lemond Tete de Course, designed for road racing (angle varies depending on frame size)
- In motorcycles, the steering axis angle is called the rake and is measured counter-clock-wise from the vertical when viewed from the right side. A 0° rake would be vertical. Some examples of caster angles are:
  - 25.5 degrees on the streetfighter 2007 Moto Guzzi Breva V 1100
  - 27.5 degrees on the cruiser 2007 Moto Guzzi Nevada Classic 750

== Head tube diameters ==
Head tubes can use one of several size standards

- Bicycles

The head tube of a bicycle is sometimes designated by the fork steerer column it accepts. This can lead to confusion, since head tube inside diameters are dependent on the headset standard. For example, frames that take 25.4 mm (1 in) steerer columns can have three different inside diameters for threaded and threadless headsets (not including integrated-type headsets). The wide variety of integrated and non-standard, proprietary headsets that some frame manufacturers have created (and abandoned in some cases) makes listing all current and past head tube dimensions problematic. The following table includes the most common sizes; nominal head tube diameters are assuming a 0.1-0.2 mm interference fit, which is what most head tube reaming cutters are designed to bore. Adequate press fits are typically between 0.1 and 0.25 mm of interference.

Steerer column nominal OD	Headset standard	Head tube nominal ID
25.4 mm (1″)	1″ JIS	28.8 mm
25.4 mm (1″)	1″ ISO	30.0 mm
25.4 mm (1″)	1″ BMX/OPC	32.5 mm
28.6 mm (1 1/8″)	1 1/8″ standard, threaded and threadless	33.8 mm
28.6 mm (1 1/8″)	IS 1 1/8″ integrated 45°×36°	41.1 mm
28.6 mm (1 1/8″)	Campagnolo "Hiddenset" 45°×45°	41.9 mm
28.6 mm (1 1/8″)	Zero Stack/ Internal	43.9 mm
31.75 mm (1 1/4″)	1 1/4″ standard	36.8 mm
38.1 mm (1.5″)	38.1 mm standard	49.6 mm

- Motorcycles

Standard motorcycle head tubes and headsets are sized for a 25.4 mm (1 in) diameter fork steerer tube.

== See also ==
- Bicycle fork
- Bicycle frame
- Motorcycle fork
