= Bicycle fork =

Bicycle piece

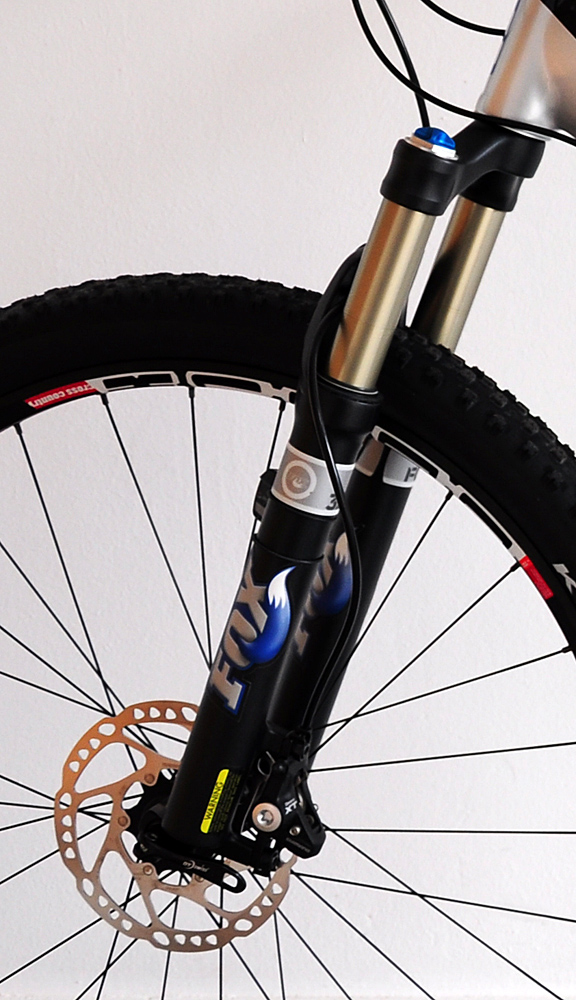
Suspension fork of a mountain bike with disc brake

Shape of a bicycle fork

A bicycle fork is the part of a bicycle that holds the front wheel.

A fork typically consists of two blades which are joined at the top by a fork crown. The crown is often at the front. Most suspension forks have an arch connecting the two sides of the lowers (the part connected to the axle.) It is often in front of the stanchions (shaft the lowers slide on) but not always. Above the crown, a steerer tube attaches the fork to the bicycle and the handlebars (via a stem) allowing the rider to steer the bicycle. The steerer tube of the fork interfaces with the frame via bearings called a headset mounted in the head tube.

At the bottom of the fork, fork ends hold the wheel. Usually, either the axle is bolted to the fork, or a quick release skewer passes through a hollow axle, clamping the axle to the fork. A bicycle dropout (drop out, frame end, or fork end), is a slot in a frame or fork where the axle of the wheel is attached.

The term fork is sometimes also used to describe the part of a bicycle that holds the rear wheel, which on 19th century ordinary or penny-farthing bicycles was also a bladed fork. On most modern bicycle designs the rear wheel is now attached to a rear triangle comprising the seat tube, a pair of seat stays, and a pair of chain stays, rather than an actual fork, but the rear fork usage persists.

== Dimensions ==
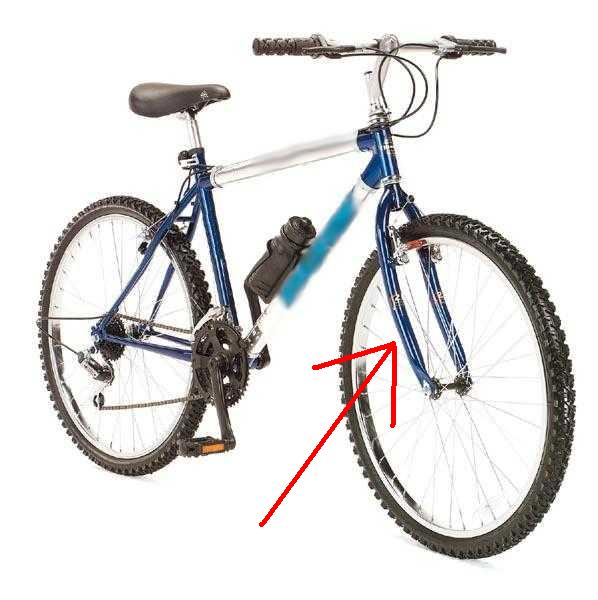
The location of the fork on a bicycle

Forks have several key dimensions which include: offset, length, width, steerer tube length, and steerer tube diameter.

=== Offset ===
Bicycle forks usually have an offset, or rake (which is different from rake of motorcycle forks), that places the fork ends forward of the steering axis. This is achieved by curving the blades forward, angling straight blades forward, or placing the fork ends forward of the centerline of the blades. The latter is used in suspension forks that must have straight blades in order for the suspension mechanism to work. Curved fork blades can also provide some shock absorption.

The purpose of this offset is to reduce 'trail', the distance that the front wheel ground contact point trails behind the point where the steering axis intersects the ground. Too much trail makes a bicycle feel difficult to turn.

Road racing bicycle forks have an offset of 40–55 mm. For touring bicycles and other designs, the frame's head angle and wheel size must be taken into account when determining offset, and there is a narrow range of acceptable offsets to give good handling characteristics. The general rule is that a slacker head angle requires a fork with more offset, and small wheels require less offset than large wheels.

=== Length ===
The length of the fork is usually measured parallel to the steerer tube from the bottom of the lower bearing race to the center of the front wheel axle. A 1996 survey of 13 700c road forks found a maximum length of 374.7 mm and a minimum of 363.5 mm.

=== Width ===
The width of the fork, also called spacing, is measured colinear with the front wheel axle between the inside edges of the two fork ends. Most modern adult sized forks have 100 mm spacing. Downhill mountain bike forks designed for through axles have 110 mm spacing.

=== Steerer tube length ===
The steerer tube is sized either to just accommodate the headset bearings, in the case of a threaded headset, or to contribute to the desired handlebar height, in the case of a threadless headset.

=== Steerer tube diameter ===
When sizing a fork to a frame, the diameter of the fork steerer or steer tube – 1 in (25 mm) or 1 1/8 in (29 mm) or 1 1/2 in (38 mm) – must not be larger than that of the frame, and the length of the steerer tube should be greater than but approximately equal to the head tube length plus the stack height of the headset. Adapter kits are available to enable use of a 1 in (25 mm) fork in a frame designed for a 1 1/8 in (29 mm) steerer tube or a 1 1/8 in (29 mm) fork in a 1 1/2 in (38 mm) frame.

Manufacturers of high-end bikes, both road and mountain, have adopted tapered steerer tubes as the de facto standard, with a 1 1/8 in (29 mm) OD at the top and a 1 1/2 in (38 mm) OD at the bottom.

=== General sizing issues ===
The blades must be the proper length to both accommodate the desired wheel and have the correct amount of rake to provide the approximate steering geometry intended by the frame designer. The functional length of the fork is typically expressed in terms of Axle-to-Crown race length (A-C). Also, the axle on the wheel must fit in the fork ends (usually either a 9 mm solid or hollow axle, or a 20 mm thru-axle). Some manufacturers have introduced forks and matching hubs with proprietary standards, such as Maverick's 24 mm axle, Specialized 25 mm thru-axle and Cannondale's Lefty system.

=== Threading ===
Fork steerer tubes may be threaded or unthreaded, depending on the headset used to attach the fork to the rest of the bicycle frame. An unthreaded steel steerer tube may be threaded with an appropriate die if necessary. The thread pitch is usually 24 threads per inch except for some old Raleighs which use 26.

== Suspension ==
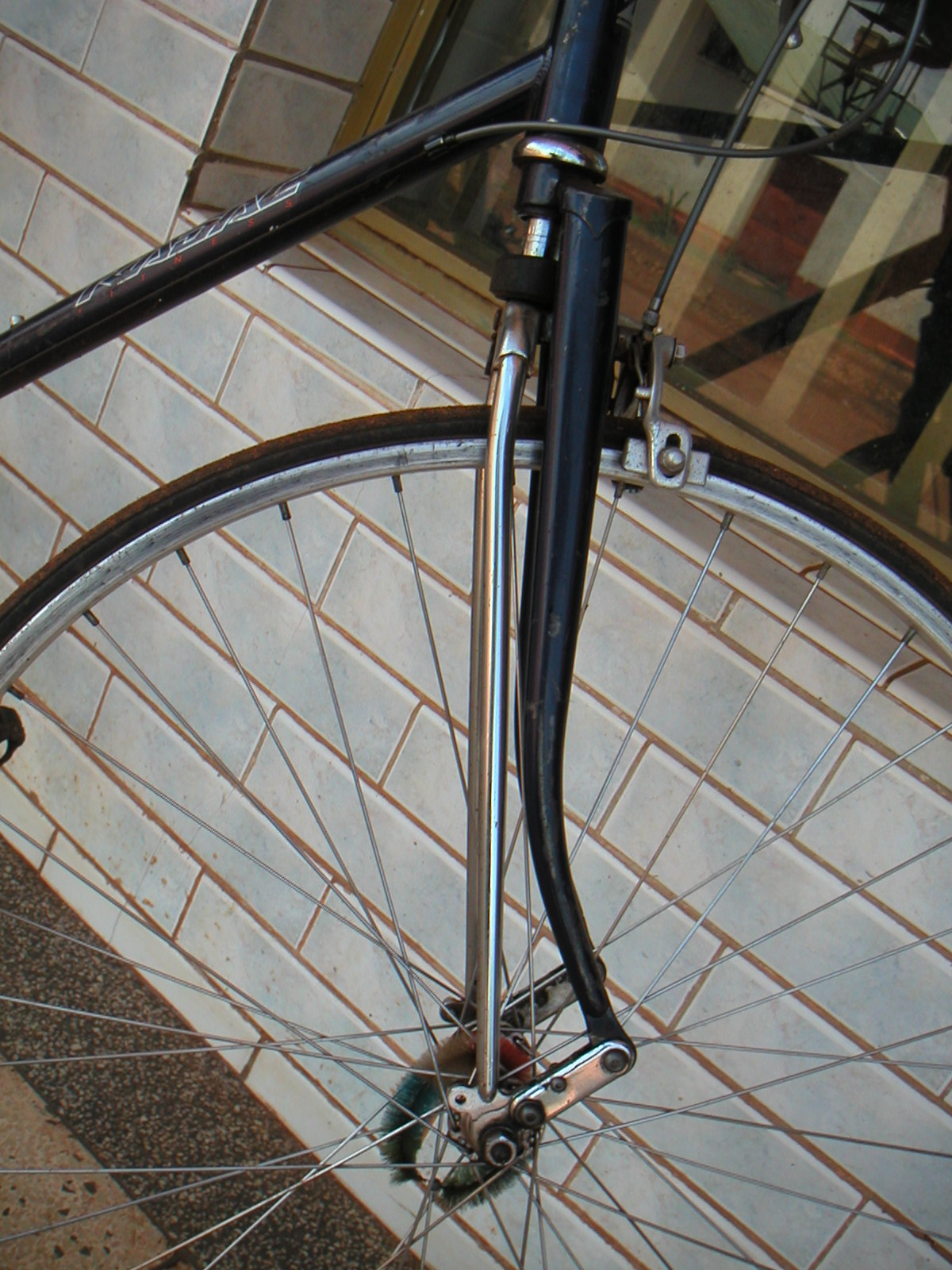
Trailing link suspension fork on a Bridgestone

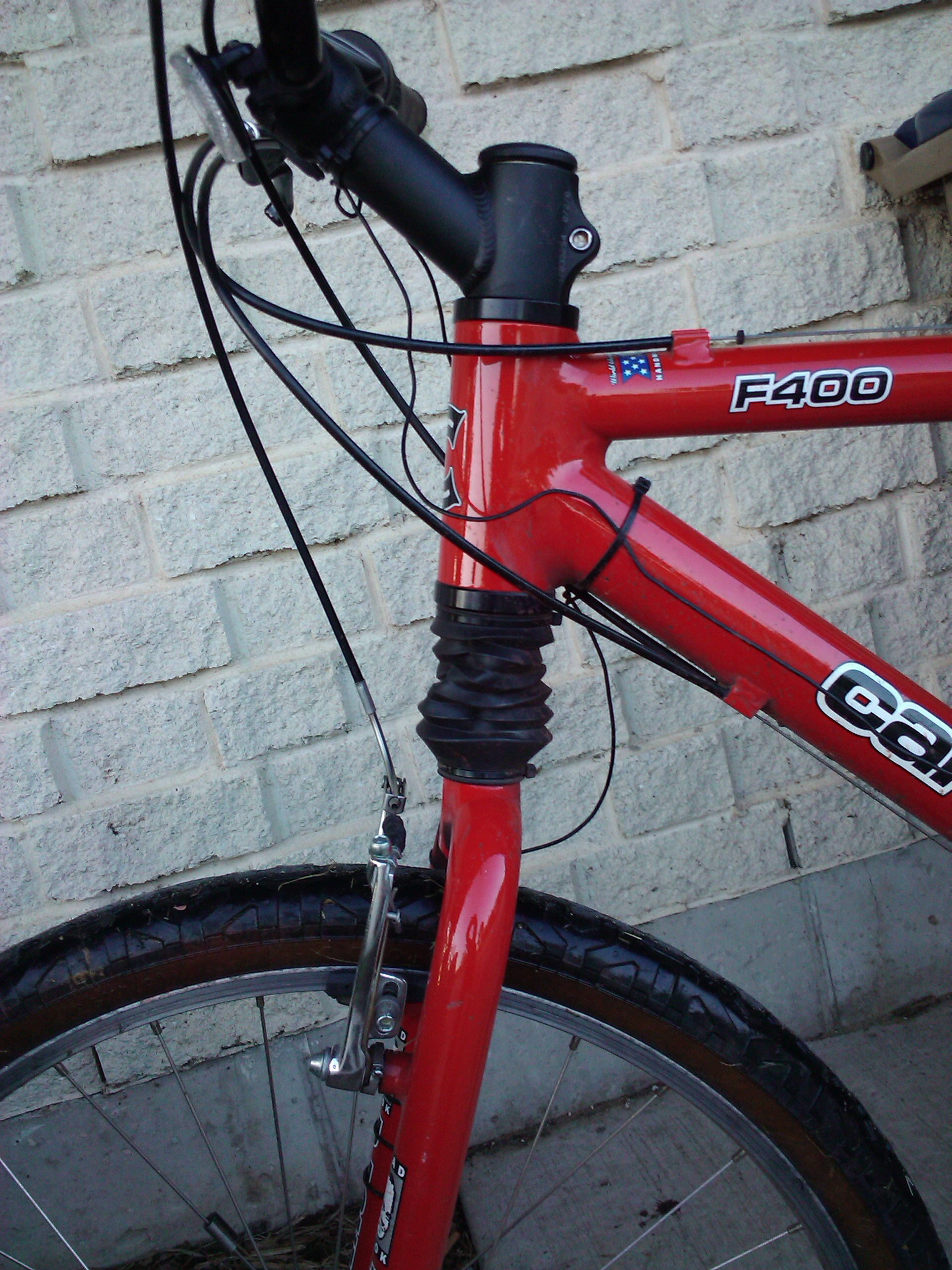
Cannondale Head Shok suspension fork

On most mountain bicycles, the fork contains a set of shock absorbers, in which case the blades typically consist of upper and lower telescoping tubes and are called "legs." The suspension travel and handling characteristics vary depending on the type of mountain biking the fork is designed for. For instance, manufacturers produce different forks for cross-country (XC), downhill, and freeride riding. Forks designed for XC racing are typically lighter, less robust and have less suspension travel than those designed for rougher terrain and more extreme conditions.

Popular makers of suspension forks include Cannondale, Fox, SR Suntour, Manitou, Marzocchi, and RockShox.

Suspension fork design has advanced in recent years with suspension forks becoming increasingly sophisticated and diverse in design. The amount of suspension travel available has increased over time. When suspension forks were introduced, 80–100 mm of travel was deemed sufficient for a downhill mountain bike. Typically this amount of travel is now used in XC disciplines, with downhill forks now offering 150 to 200 mm of travel for handling extreme terrain. This is not the limit of suspension fork travel; for example, the Marzocchi Super Monster T offers 300 mm (12 inches) of travel.

Other advances in design include adjustable travel allowing riders to adapt the fork's travel to the specific terrain profile. Typically, less suspension travel is needed for uphill or flat terrain than for downhill terrain. Advanced designs also often feature the ability to lock out the fork to eliminate or drastically reduce the fork's travel for more efficient riding over smooth sections of terrain. This lockout can sometimes be activated remotely by a cable and lever on the handlebars.

The shock absorber usually consists of two parts: a spring and a damper or dashpot. The spring may be implemented with a steel or titanium coil, an elastomer, or even compressed air. The choice of spring material has a fundamental effect on the characteristics of the fork as a whole. Coil spring forks are often heavier than designs which use compressed air springs, but they are more easily designed to exhibit a linear, Hookean response throughout their travel. Replacing steel coils with titanium coils in a design can decrease the weight of the design but leads to an increase in expense. Air springs utilize the thermodynamic property of gases that their pressures increase as they are compressed adiabatically. As the "spring" is provided by air rather than a coil of metal, forks with air springs are often lighter. This makes their use more common in XC designs. Another advantage of this type of fork design is that the spring constant can be adjusted by adjusting the air pressure. This allows a fork to be tuned to a rider's weight. One disadvantage of this design is the difficulty in achieving a linear response, as pressure varies approximately inversely (not linearly) with volume in a gas. As the fork compresses, the effective spring constant of the fork increases. Increasing the volume of the air inside the spring can reduce this effect, but the volume of the spring is ultimately limited, as it needs to be contained within the dimension of the fork blade.

The damper usually forces oil to pass through one or more small openings or shim stacks in the suspension fork. On some models, the spring, the damper, or both may be adjusted for rider weight, riding style, terrain, or any combination of these or other factors. The two components may be separated with the spring mechanism in one blade and the damper in the other.

== Variations ==
There have been many fork design variations tried over the years. Several are still in use today.

=== Suspension ===
Some have employed linkages to provide the mechanical action instead of relying upon telescoping elements. Others, notably Cannondale use a single shock built into the steerer tube above the crown. Another notable recent development in fork technology is the Lauf Spring which utilises composite leaf springs to provide mechanical shock absorption and damping, whilst offering a sizable weight reduction compared to conventional designs

=== Single blade ===
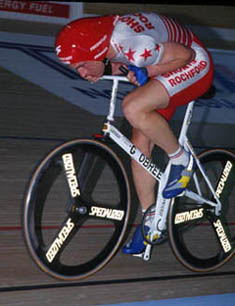
Single-bladed fork on Graeme Obree's Old Faithful

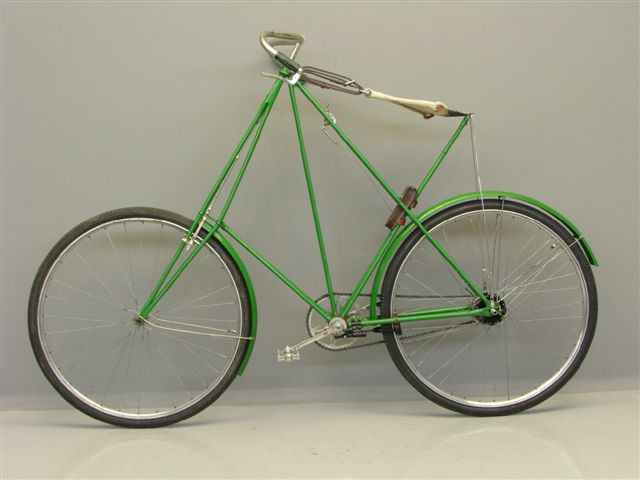
Dursley Pedersen bicycle circa 1910.

Some manufacturers, such as Cannondale and Strida, offer a fork with a single leg. Many of Cannondale's single bladed forks, called Lefty, are suspension forks, in either conventional or inverted configurations. These forks use linear needle roller bearings on octagonal races to transmit the steering torque to the wheel, while conventional two bladed suspension forks use tubular linear plain bearings. Use of a Lefty fork requires a special Lefty hub, which attaches to the fork end by means of a screw that presses the hub onto the axle that is fixed to the fork.

=== Track bikes ===
Track forks traditionally have round-section blades rather than the oval section used on road bikes, partly because a round section is stiffer under the lateral forces imposed by frequent sprinting but mainly because track racing tyres are always narrow and do not require the additional clearance afforded by oval blades. Round blades necessitate a special fork crown with matching round sockets. Track forks may not be drilled for a front brake if the bicycle is intended to be used only on a velodrome. The clearance between the tyre and the underside of the fork crown is often less than 5mm.

=== Attachment to the frame ===
Not all forks steer on bearings installed in a head tube. The forks on Stridas and Pedersen bicycles pivot about an axis external to the fork, supported at two different points on the frame. A new trend in triathlon bikes is similar, called a bayonet or external-steerer fork, but the pivot bearings are at the top and bottom of something that still resembles a head tube.

== Materials ==
Forks have been made from steel, aluminum, carbon fiber, titanium, magnesium, and various combinations. For example, a fork may have carbon fiber blades with an aluminum crown, steerer tube, or fork ends.

In rigid forks the material, shape, weight, and design of the forks can noticeably affect the feel and handling of the bicycle. Carbon fiber forks are popular in road bicycles because they are light, and also because they can be designed to lessen and absorb vibrations from the road surface.

There have also been examples of wooden forks. However, these have not been common in the modern era.

== Attachment points ==
Forks may have attachment points for brakes, racks, and fenders. These may be located in the crown, along the blades, and near the fork ends. These are often holes, threaded or not, and may be located on tabs that protrude.

== See also ==
- Bicycle and motorcycle dynamics
- Bicycle and motorcycle geometry
- Bicycle frame
- Bicycle suspension
- Duplex steering
- Fork tube
- Glossary of cycling
- List of bicycle parts
- Motorcycle fork
- Outline of cycling
- Stem (bike)

== Gallery ==
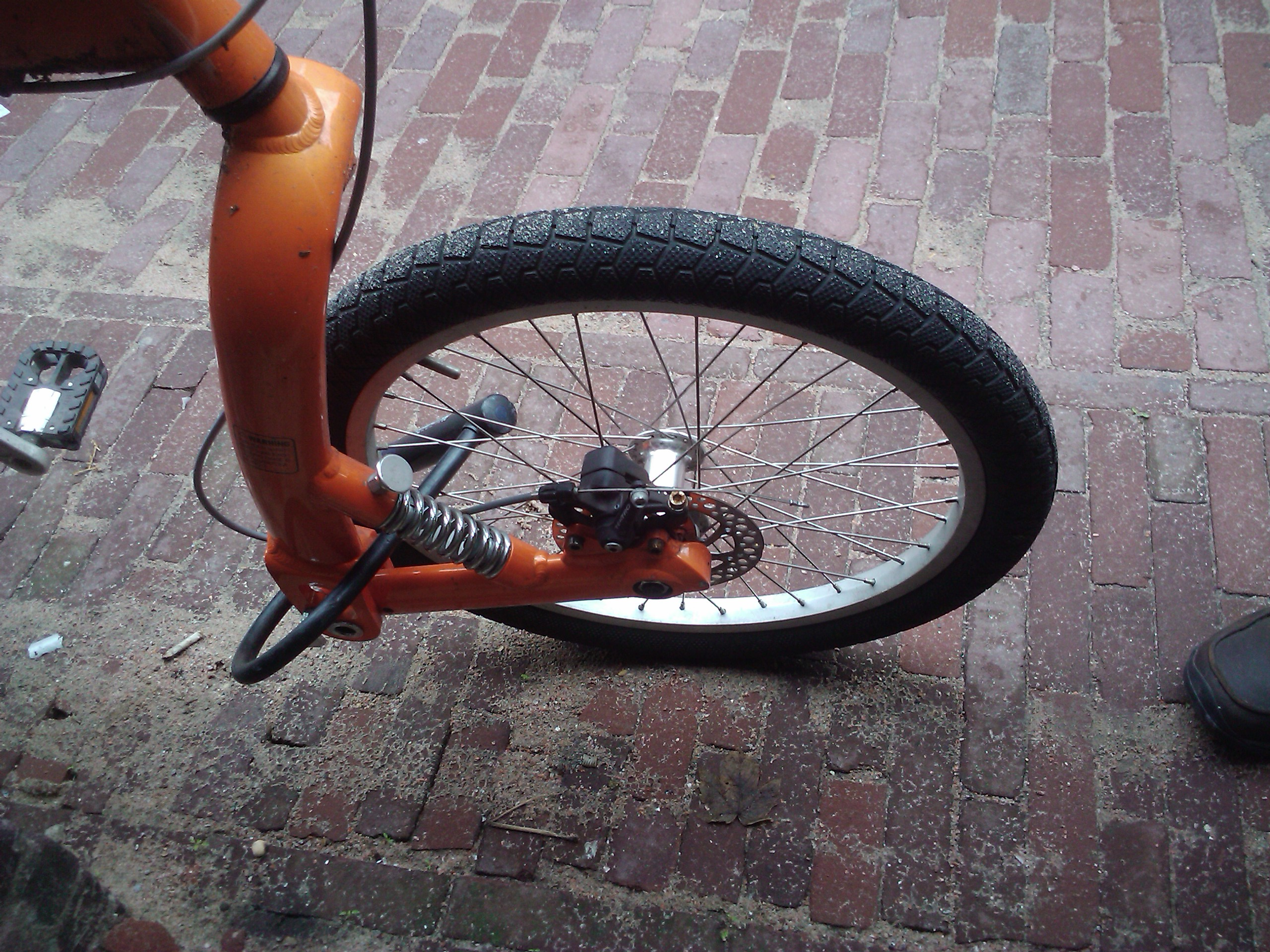
Leading link fork on a BuzBike

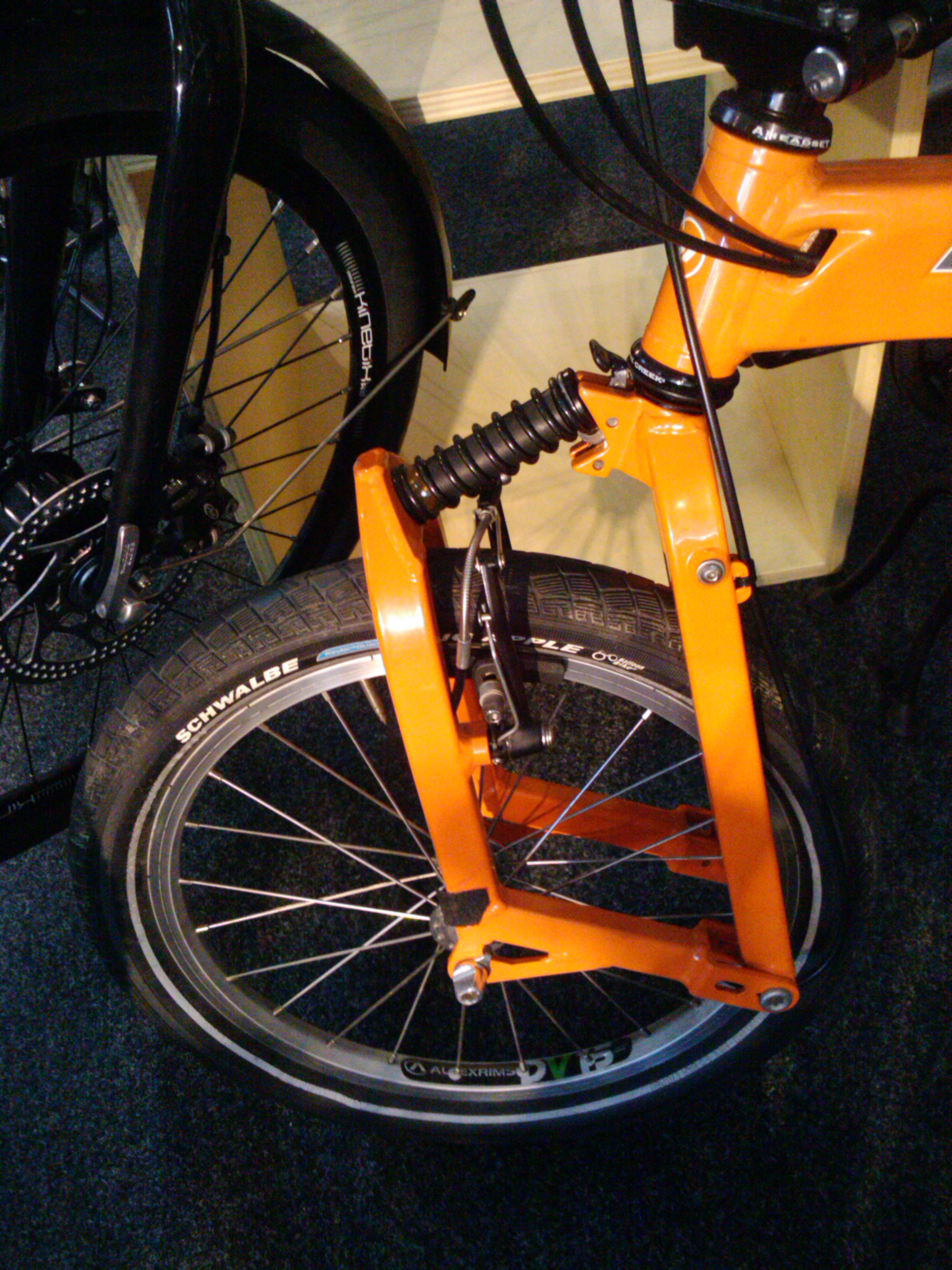
Leading link fork on a Birdy folding bicycle

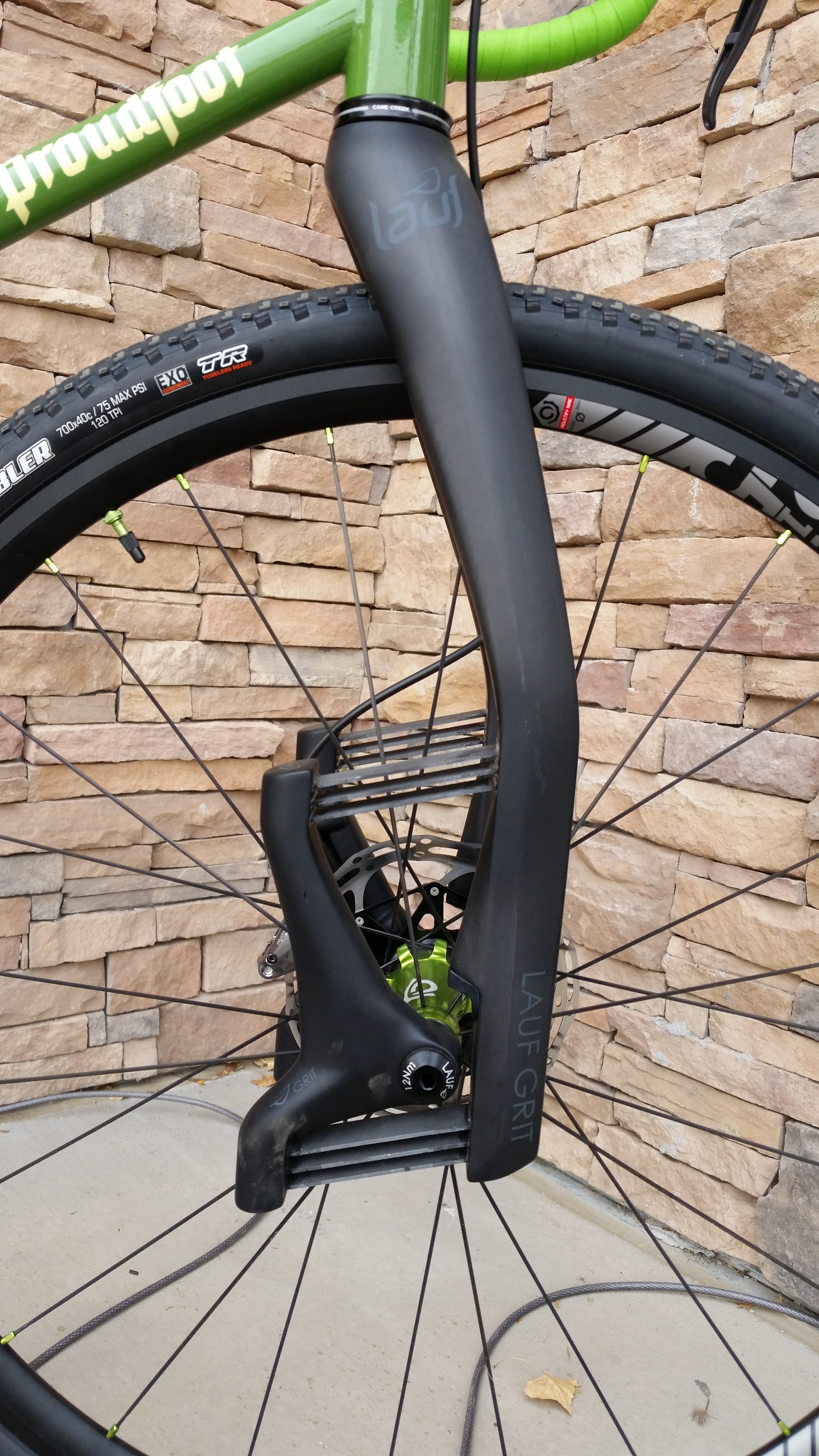
Lauf pivotless, trailing link fork

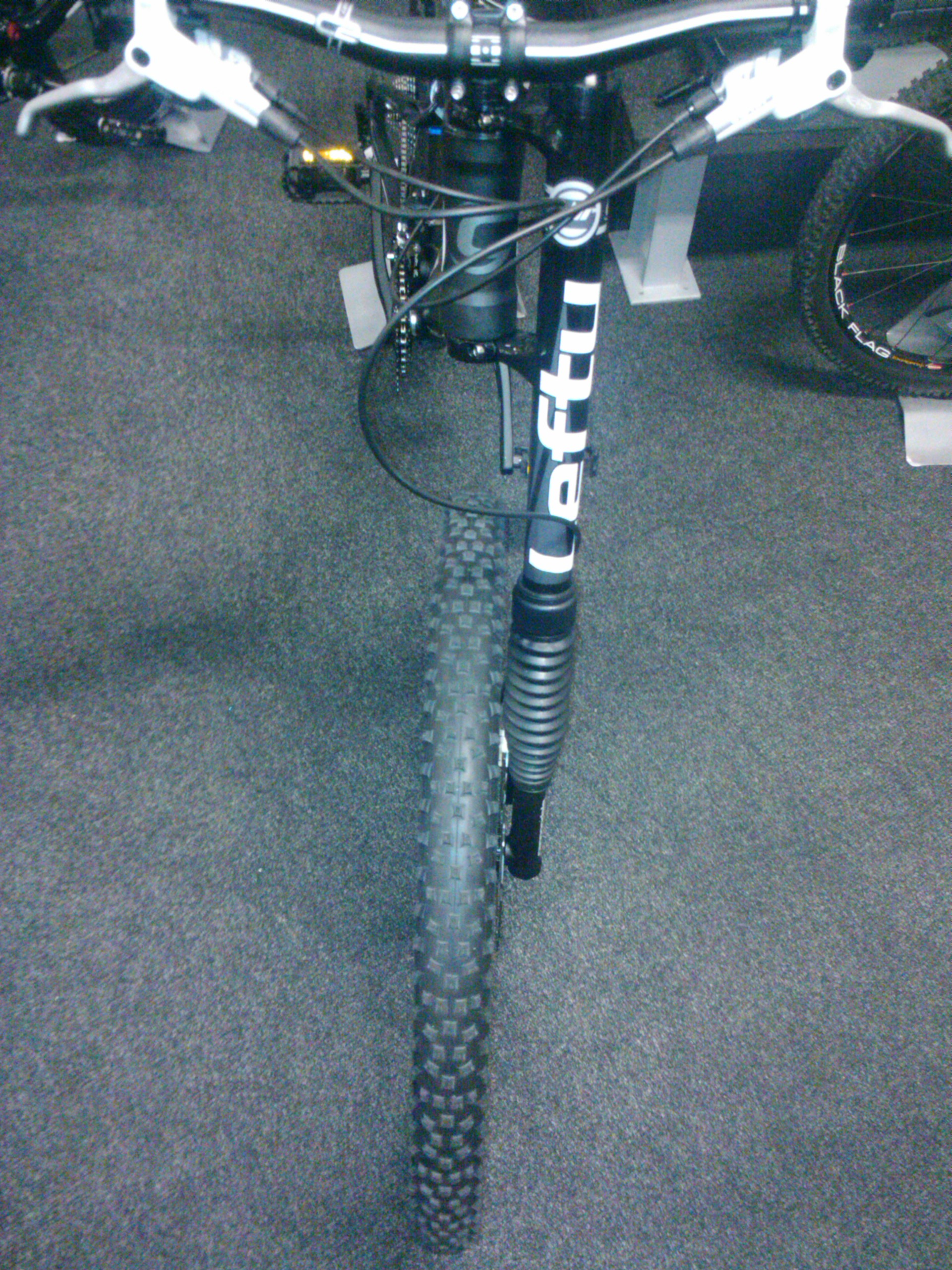
Cannondale Lefty

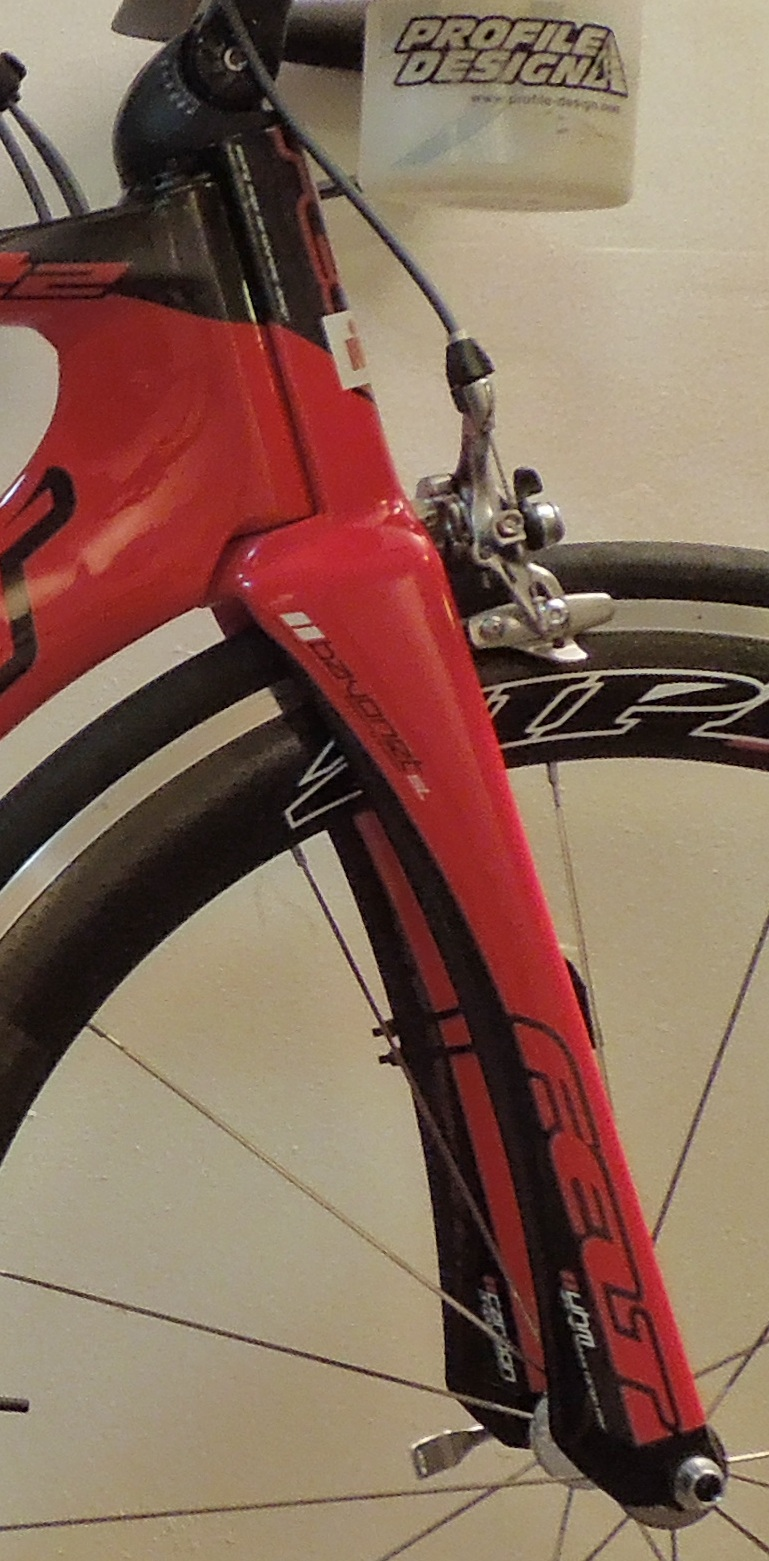
Felt B2 Pro Bayonet Fork

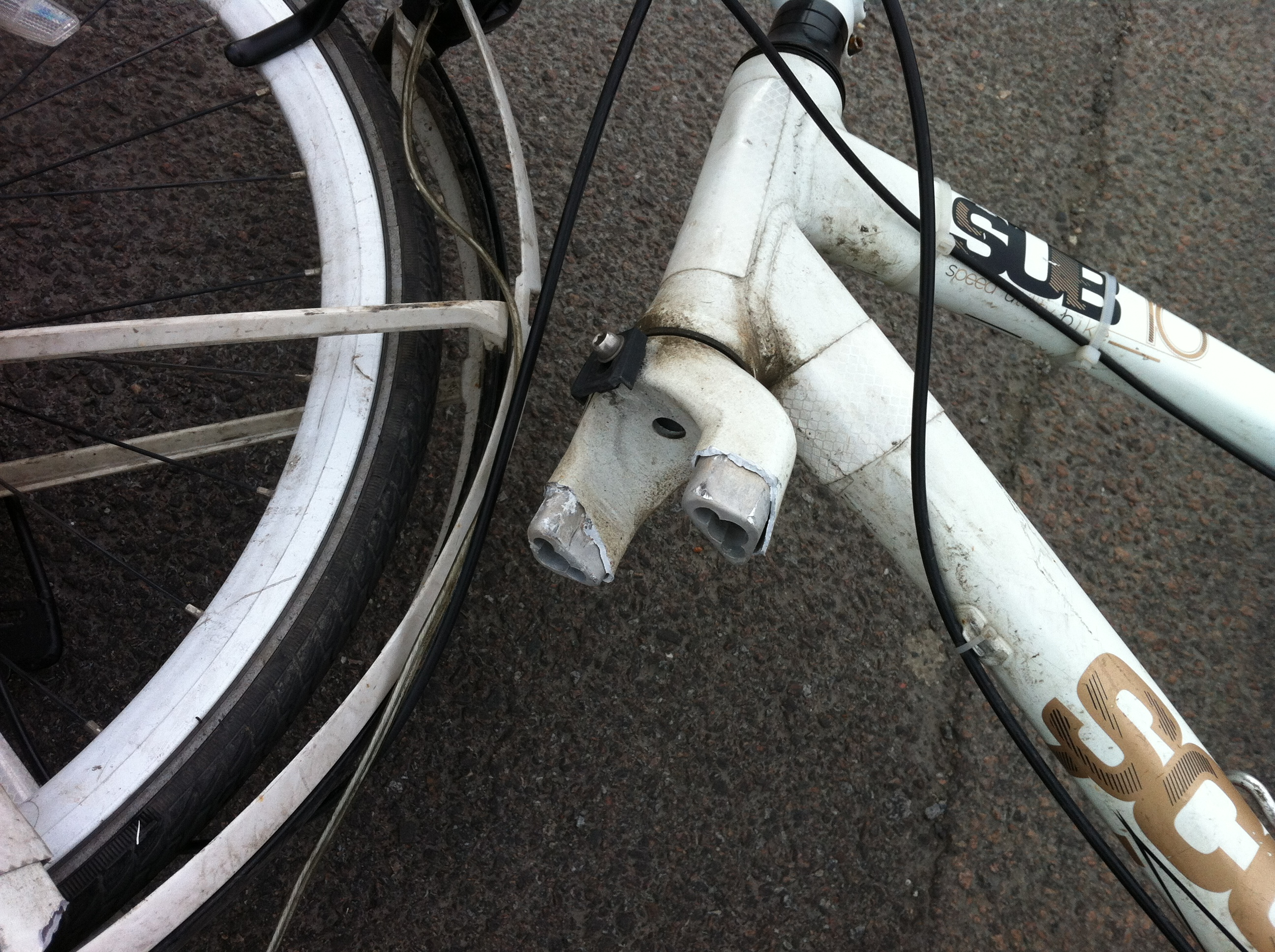
Scott Sub 10 with a fractured bicycle fork

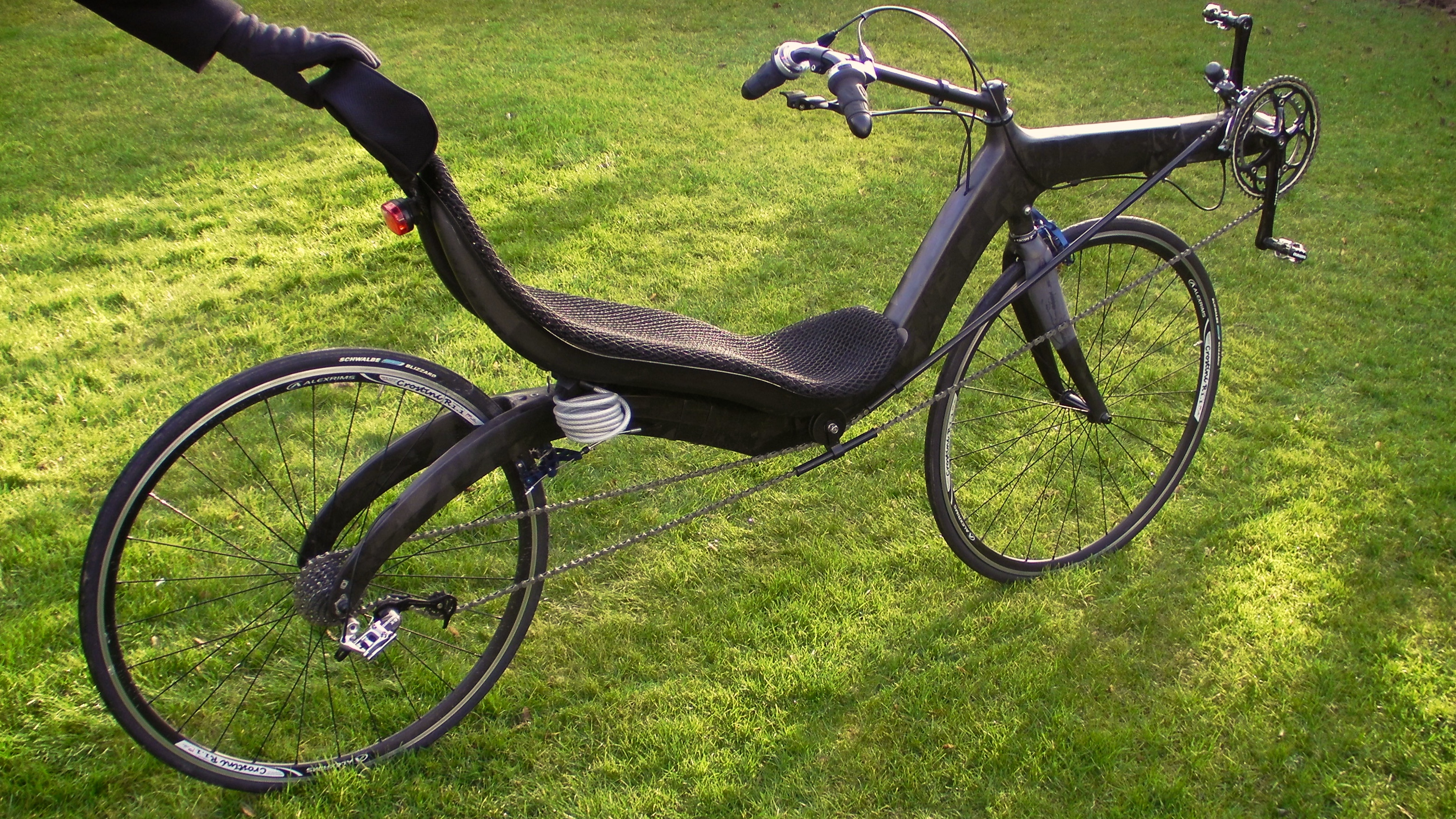
M5 Carbon High Racer with a double bladed rear and front fork.
