= Honda CB400T =

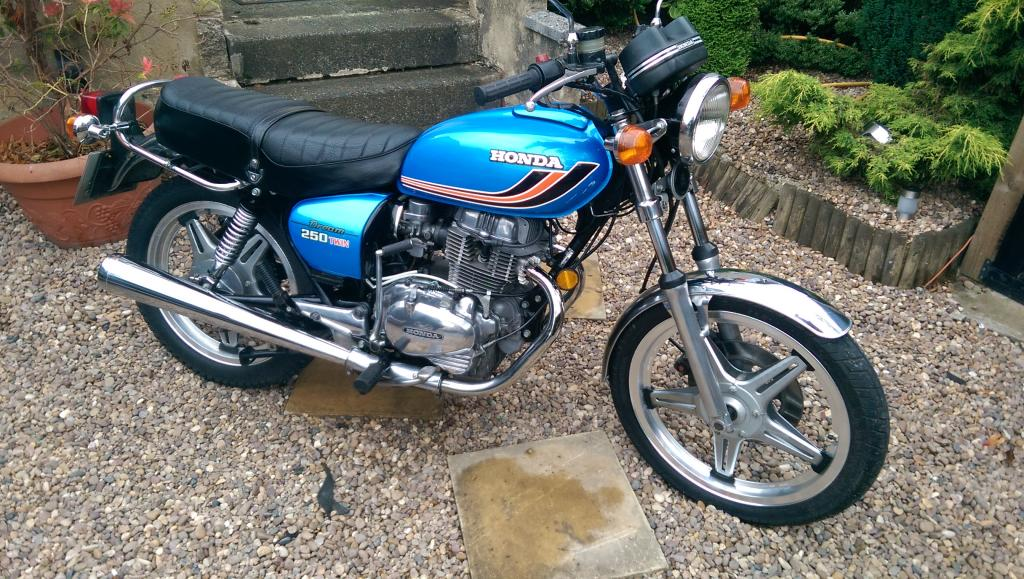
- Honda CB250T Dream
- Manufacturer: Honda Motor Company
- Also called: Dream (UK); Hawk (US)
- Production: 1977 (Dream); 1977–1981 (Hawk)
- Predecessor: Honda CB360
- Successor: Honda CB250N/CB400N (Europe); Honda CB450SC Night Hawk (US)
- Class: Standard
- Engine: 395 cc (24.1 cu in), air-cooled, four-stroke, sohc with three valves per cylinder, parallel-twin
- Bore / stroke: 70.5 mm × 50.6 mm (2.78 in × 1.99 in)
- Compression ratio: 9.3:1
- Top speed: 108.69 mph (174.92 km/h) (Dream)
- Power: 34.16 bhp (25.47 kW) at rear wheel (Hawk)
- Torque: 21.03 lb⋅ft (28.51 N⋅m) at rear wheel (Hawk)
- Ignition type: Capacitor discharge electronic ignition, electric start, kick start (Hawk I & II, Dream only)
- Transmission: 5-speed manual, chain final drive (Dream, Hawk I, II); 6-speed manual (Hawk); 2-speed semi-automatic (CB400A Hondamatic)
- Frame type: Diamond
- Suspension: Front: telescopic forks; Rear: swingarm with twin shock absorbers
- Brakes: Front drum; rear drum (Hawk I); Front hydraulic disc brake; rear drum (Dream, Hawk II, Hondamatic)
- Tires: Front 3.60"-19; Rear 4.10"-18
- Wheelbase: 1,389 mm (54.7 in)
- Dimensions: L: 2,131 mm (83.9 in); W: 729 mm (28.7 in); H: 1,125 mm (44.3 in)
- Seat height: 800 mm (31 in)
- Weight: Dream 179.6 kg (396 lb) (dry); Hawk I 172 kg (379 lb); Hawk II182 kg (401 lb); Hondamatic 187 kg (412 lb) (wet)
- Fuel capacity: 14 L (3.1 imp gal; 3.7 US gal)
- Fuel consumption: 48 mpg_{‑imp} (5.9 L/100 km; 40 mpg_{‑US})
- Related: Honda CB250T; Honda CB250N; Honda CB400N; Honda CB400T I/T II; Honda CM400; Honda CB450T; Honda CB450SC; Honda CB450DX-K

The Honda CB400T is a range of motorcycles built by Honda. In the United Kingdom it was known as the Dream, whereas in the United States it was known as the Hawk. A Honda CB250T version was also available in some markets including the UK and Australia for licensing reasons. In Japan, it is also nicknamed "Babu (バブ)" because of its unique exhaust sound.

== Background ==
The model was the successor to the ageing twin cylinder CB360 and the highly regarded, but expensive for the 400 cc class, four-cylinder CB400F. The CB400T has two fewer cylinders than its CB400F predecessor. Although the press was initially skeptical of the motorcycle, reviews stated that it was a worthwhile successor and more than capable of competing with contemporary rivals. Its short-stroke, overhead camshaft 395 cc (24.1 cu in) air-cooled parallel-twin had been completely redesigned, with a chain drive that operated three valves per cylinder, two for intake and one for exhaust. The exhaust system featured a two-into-one chamber with twin mufflers.

The engine differs from rival manufacturers' 400 cc twin-cylinder models because it has a 360° crank layout similar to many traditional British parallel twins instead of the more common 180° crank layout. Counter-rotating balance-shafts help to reduce unwanted vibrations caused by the 360° crank layout. Honda fitted these models with capacitor discharge ignition instead of the points system found on its predecessors, that required frequent maintenance. It uses a five-speed transmission with a chain final drive. Fuelling is provided by twin Keihin carburettors. A steel diamond cradle type frame uses the engine as a stressed member to reduce mass and increase ground clearance.

In Japan it was sold as the Hawk I and Hawk II. The Hawk II was introduceed in May 1977; in Japanese specifications, the engine produces 40 PS (29 kW) at 9,500 rpm. It received cast, five-spoke "Comstar" wheels which were made in-house. Therew was also the smaller CB250T, which develops 26 PS (19 kW) and weighs 181 kg (399 lb).

== UK market ==
The CB400T Dream was introduced in 1977. It has alloy and steel compound Comstar wheels. Fuelling is provided by 32 mm Keihin carburettors. Braking is provided by a single hydraulic front disc and an expanding rear drum. The Dream was also available in a 250 cc CB250T version to comply with the UK learner regulations at the time. Period reviews stated the bike was a mid-range tourer with rider comfort being considered one of its best attributes.

The Dream was only on sale for a six-month period before it was succeeded by the Euro-styled CB250N and CB400N Super Dream in 1978.

== US market ==
In the United States, as well as in Japan, the CB400T was known as the "Hawk" (stylised as "HaWk"). They were advertised under the slogan "Fly the Hawk – motorcycling will never be the same". The CB400T was marketed alongside the mechanically similar, more cruiser-inspired Honda CM400. It was launched in 1978 in three different variants, the CB400TI Hawk I, CB400TII Hawk II, and CB400A Hawk Hondamatic.

=== CB400TI Hawk I ===
The "budget" model of the Hawk line up. It has front and rear drum brakes and spoked wheels with chrome rims. It is kick start only and the only instrument is a speedometer. It also has a slightly different and larger capacity fuel tank than the other two models. Due to the removal of certain components the Hawk I is actually 10 kg lighter than the more premium Hawk II.

=== CB400TII Hawk II ===
The "sport" model in the line up and more similar to the UK spec Dream. It has a single front disc brake with aluminum wheels. The instruments include a tachometer as well as a speedometer. Electric start supplements the kick start.

=== CB400A Hawk Hondamatic ===
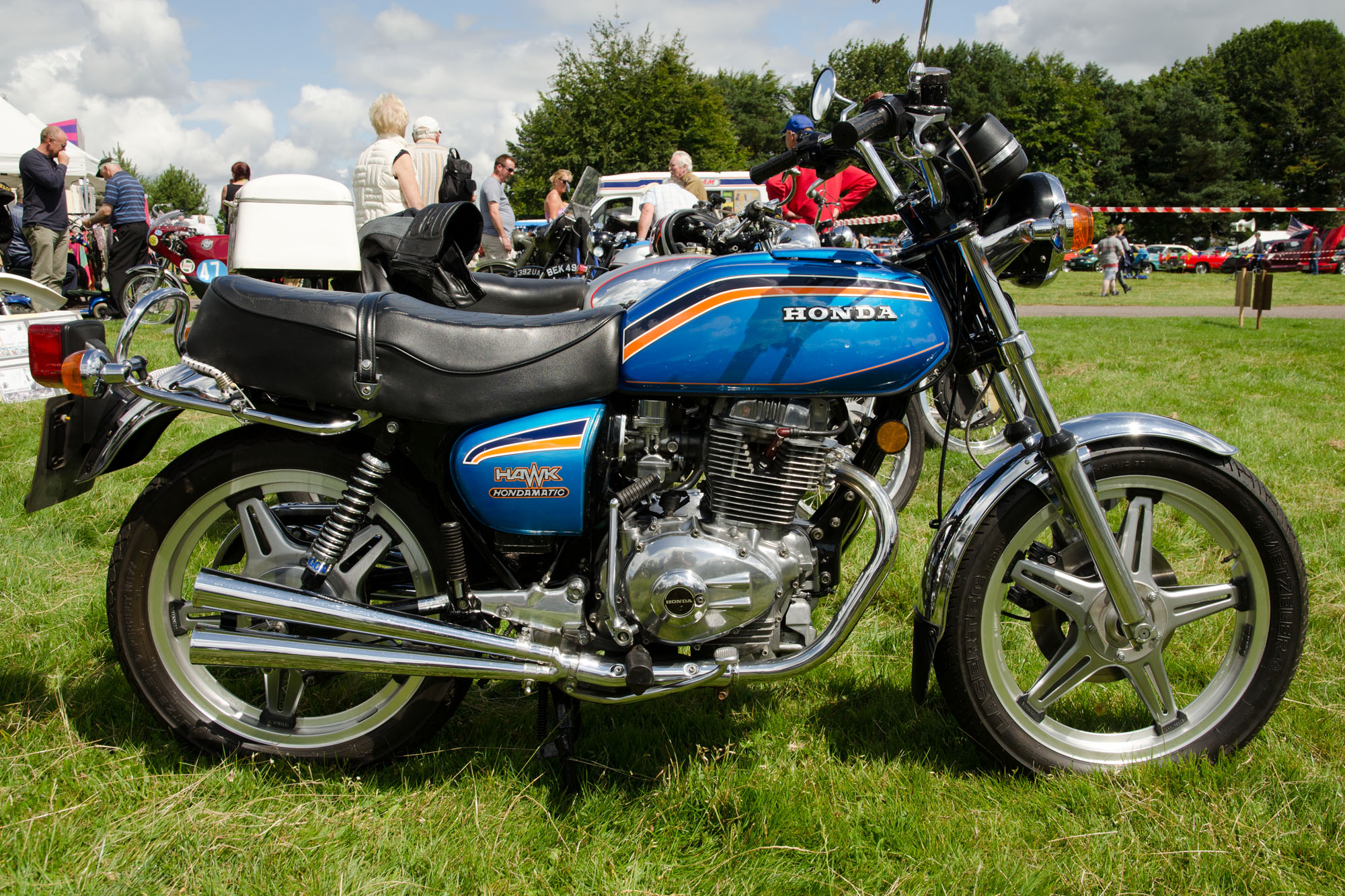
1978 CB400A Hawk Hondamatic

The CB400A has a two-speed semi-automatic transmission. It has a torque converter and two forward gears (high and low) that have to be manually selected by the rider. There is a gear position indicator in lieu of a tachometer in the instrument binnacle. A parking brake replaced the clutch lever. This model has 28 mm Keihin carburettors which lowers the peak power in exchange for low-down response.

=== CB400T Hawk ===
In 1980, Honda offered only one model, designated the Hawk, now simply designated CB400T. The CM400E took over the role of the cheaper Hawk I. It is similar to the European CB400NA. It has the same European styling and six-speed manual gearbox, although the pegs, footrest and gear lever are in the same position as the earlier Hawk variants. The bike became electric start only, saving some weight by removing the largely redundant kickstarter. Smaller, 30 mm, Keihin CV carburettors with accelerator pumps were fitted to comply with US emissions controls. The 1981 model is similar to the European CB400NB and has a dual piston front brake caliper, plastic front fender and a different tank shape.

== Legacy ==
Although the Dream was only on sale in the UK for six months, its successor, the Super Dream, was on sale for eight years. The engine and chassis underpinned various other models until the early 1990s, culminating with the CB450DX (1989–1992).

The Hawk and CM range continued as the CB450 Hawk, later CB450SC Nighthawk and CM450 models.

== See also ==
- Honda CB400N
