= Ignition system (disambiguation) =

Articles on Ignition system include:

- Ignition system
- Capacitor discharge ignition
- Delco ignition system
- Hot-tube ignitor
- Inductive discharge ignition
- Outside flame ignitor
- Piezo ignition

== See also ==
- Detonator
- Exploder
