= Honda CB250N/CB400N =

Honda CB250N (CB400N)
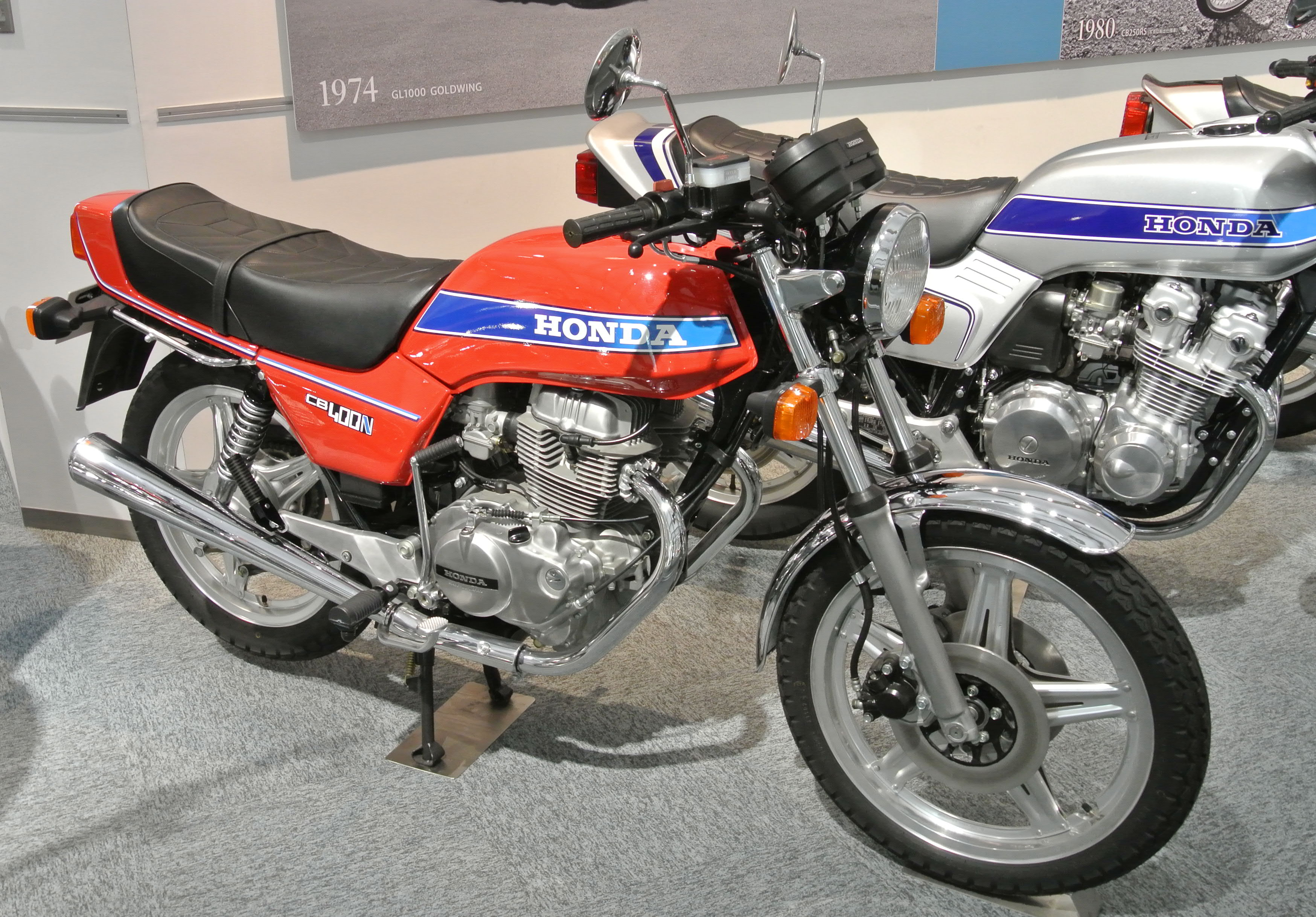
- Honda CB400N in the Honda Collection Hall
- Manufacturer: Honda Motor Company
- Also called: Super Dream
- Production: 1978–1986
- Predecessor: Honda CB250T/CB400T Dream
- Successor: Honda CB450DX-K
- Class: Standard
- Engine: Air-cooled four-stroke, parallel-twin, three valves per cylinder, sohc
- Bore / stroke: 62.0 mm × 41.4 mm (2.44 in × 1.63 in) (250N); 70.5 mm × 50.6 mm (2.78 in × 1.99 in) (400N)
- Compression ratio: 9.4:1 (250N); 9.3:1 (400N)
- Top speed: 83 mph (134 km/h) (CB250N); 103.44 mph (166.47 km/h) (CB400N)
- Power: 27 bhp (20 kW) @ 10,000rpm (250N); 43 bhp (32 kW) @ 9,500rpm (400N)
- Torque: 14.7 lb⋅ft (19.9 N⋅m) @ 8,500rpm (250N); 24.5 lb⋅ft (33.2 N⋅m) @ 8,000rpm (400N)
- Ignition type: Capacitor discharge electronic ignition, electric start, kick start (N variant only)
- Transmission: 6-speed, chain drive manual
- Suspension: Front: telescopic forks; Rear: swingarm with twin shock absorbers (adjustable for pre-load)
- Brakes: Single-disc front, single piston caliper; drum rear (250N); Twin discs front; drum rear (400N)
- Tyres: 3.60S19-4PR front, 4.10S18-4PR rear
- Wheelbase: 1.395 m (4 ft 6.9 in); 1.390 m (4 ft 6.7 in) (400N)
- Dimensions: L: 2.115 m (6 ft 11.3 in); W: .730 m (2 ft 4.7 in); H: 1.105 m (3 ft 7.5 in)
- Seat height: 0.795 m (2 ft 7.3 in)
- Weight: 167 kg (368 lb); 171 kg (377 lb) (400N) (dry)
- Fuel capacity: 14 L (3.1 imp gal; 3.7 US gal)
- Related: Honda CB250T; Honda CB400T; Honda CM400; Honda CB450T; Honda CB450SC; Honda CB450DX-K

The Honda CB250N and CB400N Super Dream are motorcycles manufactured by the Honda Motor Company from 1978 to 1986. The successor to the short lived Dream model, it had a series of revisions including a six-speed transmission and what Honda termed as European styling which resembled the CB750F and CB900F. It was a popular model for Honda with 70,000 bikes sold in the UK alone.

== Engine ==
The Super Dream was fitted with a four stroke, air-cooled, twin-cylinder engine. It had three valves per cylinder, two inlet and one exhaust, operated by a chain-driven overhead camshaft. Ignition was provided by capacitor discharge ignition (CDI). It had a 360° crank layout similar to many traditional British parallel twins, but with two balance shafts to reduce unwanted vibrations. It used a six-speed transmission and chain final drive. Fuelling was provided by twin Keihin carburettors.

== CB250N ==
The CB250N Super Dream was a 249 cc (15.2 cu in) motorbike. It was a popular model in the United Kingdom due to the licensing laws at the time allowing learners to ride any motorbike with a capacity under 250cc. The CB250N was the most popular selling bike in the UK with over 17,000 bikes sold in 1980 alone. Its popularity in the United Kingdom waned along with many in the 250cc class in 1983; this was when the maximum size of learner machines was reduced to 125 cc (7.6 cu in).

During its production run it had several variations from 1978 to 1986. The various designations were, CB250N (1978–1979), CB250NA (1980), CB250NB/NDB Deluxe (1981) and CB250NDC (1982–1985) and CB250NDD (1983–1986).

== CB400N ==
The CB400N Super Dream was very similar to the 250N variant. However, it differed from the 250N with its larger engine capacity, twin front brake discs and a halogen front head light. The instrumentation had different markings for the rev counter and speedometer to reflect the higher top speed and lower RPM redline.

The CB400N had several revisions during its production run. The launch model CB400N (1979–1980), CB400NA (1980–1981), CB400NB (1981–1983), CB400NC (1982–1985) and CB400ND (1983–1986).
