= Marcmotor ROS200 =

Italian aircraft engine

- Type: Aircraft engine
- National origin: Italy
- Manufacturer: Marcmotor

The Marcmotor ROS200 is an Italian aircraft engine, designed and produced by Marcmotor of Macerata for use in ultralight aircraft.

== Design and development ==
The ROS200 is a twin-cylinder two-stroke, in-line, 196 cc (12.0 cu in) displacement, fan-forced air-cooled, petrol engine design, with a helical gear mechanical gearbox reduction drive with a reduction ratio of 3.5:1. It employs a single capacitor discharge ignition and produces 40 hp (30 kW) at 9000 rpm, with a compression ratio of 10.6.

== Specifications (ROS200) ==
Data from Tacke

=== General characteristics ===
- Type: Twin cylinder, two stroke aircraft engine
- Bore: 50 mm (2.0 in)
- Stroke: 50 mm (2.0 in)
- Displacement: 196 cc (12.0 cu in)
- Length: 410 mm (16.1 in)
- Width: 180 mm (7.1 in)
- Height: 300 mm (11.8 in)
- Dry weight: 16 kg (35.3 lb)

=== Components ===
- Fuel type: petrol
- Cooling system: fan-forced air
- Reduction gear: helical gear mechanical gearbox

=== Performance ===
- Power output: 40 hp (30 kW)

== See also ==
Related lists

- List of aircraft engines
