= Honda CB125E =

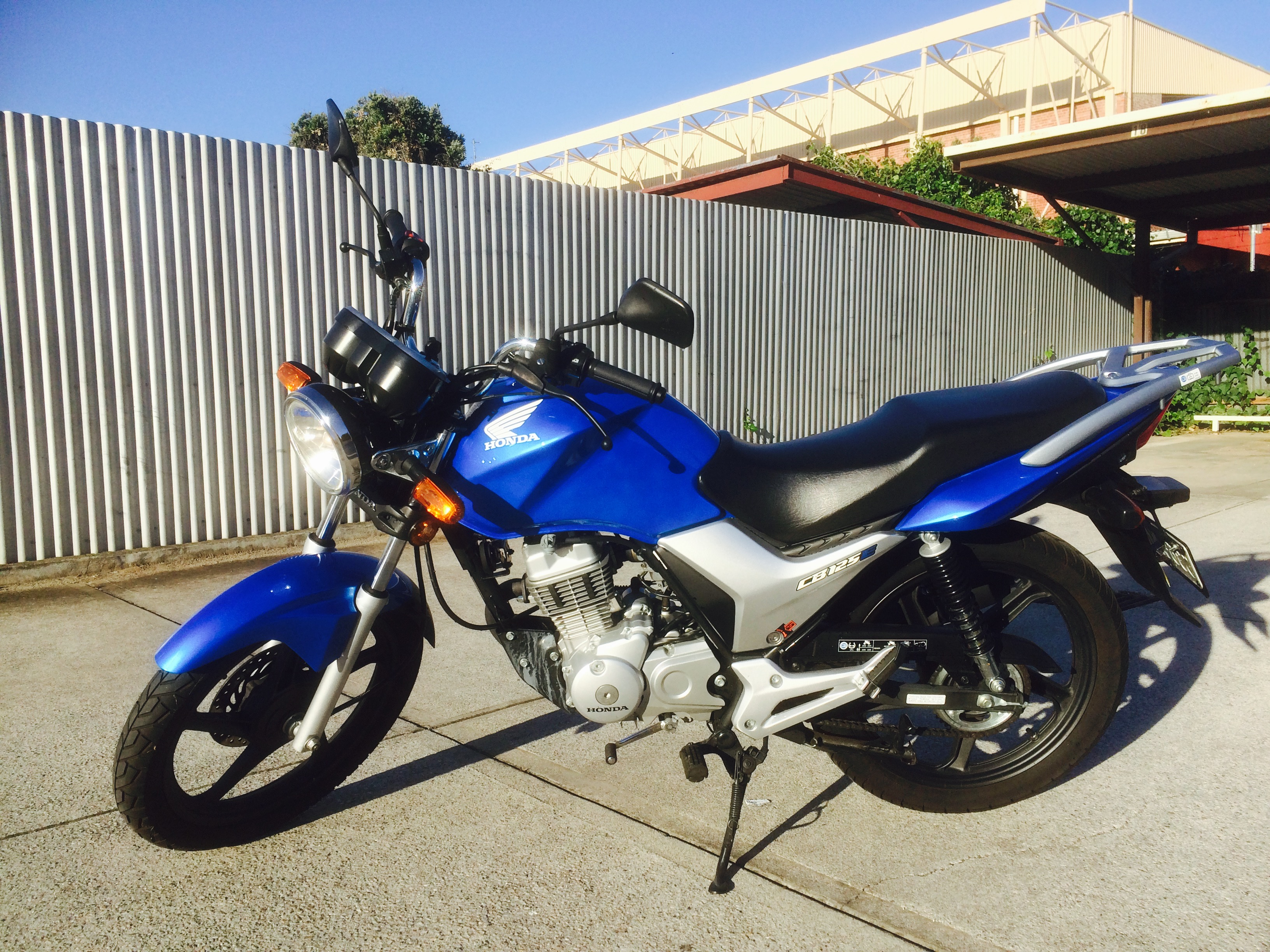
- Honda CB125E (2012)
- Manufacturer: Honda Motor Company
- Class: Standard
- Engine: 124 cc (7.6 cu in), four-stroke, single
- Bore / stroke: 52.4 mm × 57.8 mm (2.06 in × 2.28 in)
- Compression ratio: 9.2:1
- Power: 10.2 hp (7.6 kW)
- Torque: 10.03 N⋅m (7.40 lbf⋅ft)
- Ignition type: Capacitor discharge electronic ignition Electric start only
- Transmission: 5-speed manual
- Brakes: Front: disc 240 mm (9.4 in); Rear: drum 130 mm (5.1 in)
- Tyres: Front: 80/100 18M/C 47P; Rear: 90/90 18M/C 51P
- Wheelbase: 1,286 mm (50.6 in)
- Dimensions: L: 2,026 mm (79.8 in); W: 765 mm (30.1 in); H: 1,094 mm (43.1 in)
- Seat height: 767 mm (30.2 in)
- Weight: 137 kg (302 lb) (dry)
- Fuel capacity: 13.5 L (3.0 imp gal; 3.6 US gal)

The Honda CB125E is a 125cc four-stroke commuter motorcycle, manufactured by the Honda Motor Company. It has electric start and a five-speed gearbox. The engine produces approximately 10 hp (7 kW; 10 PS). The bike is equipped with front disc and rear drum brakes. Electrics are 12 volt with capacitor discharge electronic ignition and the machine is electric start only.

Top speed with a single rider is approximately 100 km/h (62 mph). Although good for city commuting, the bike lacks power and speed to keep up with free-way speeds in Australia.

It went on sale in Australia in 2012 and became one of the most reasonably priced road bikes. It was replaced with the Honda CB125F in 2023.
