= Honda CM400 =

Honda CM400T
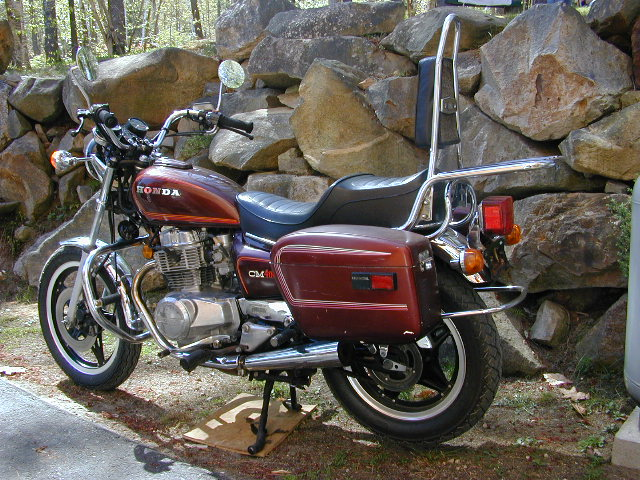
- 1979 Honda CM400T
- Manufacturer: Honda Motor Company
- Production: 1978–1982
- Successor: Honda CM450
- Class: Standard
- Engine: 395 cc (24.1 cu in), OHC, air-cooled, 3 valves/cyl 360° parallel twin,
- Bore / stroke: 70.7 mm × 50.6 mm (2.78 in × 1.99 in)
- Compression ratio: 9.3:1
- Ignition type: Capacitor discharge electronic ignition
- Transmission: 5-speed chain drive manual 2-speed semi-automatic
- Suspension: Front: telescopic Rear: swingarm
- Brakes: Front: drum (base model); Front: disc (T model, C model, A model); Rear: drum
- Tires: 3.50 in × 18 in (89 mm × 457 mm) (front) 4.60 in × 16 in (117 mm × 406 mm) (rear)

The Honda CM400 is a street bike produced by the Honda Motor Company from 1979 to 1982, part of a series of motorcycles with the prefix 'CM' using various engine capacities. It was a precursor to the Honda Rebel series of motorcycles. It was equipped with electric start and electronic ignition. Models included the CM400A (Semi-automatic or "Hondamatic"), CM400C (Custom), CM400E (Economy) and CM400T (Touring). The CM400C was produced only in 1981, making it one of the rarer models.

The Honda CM series all generally resembled the older-style flat-seat bikes from the 1960s and 1970s, with the exception of a slightly raised passenger area seat and small plastic fairings for the battery and electrical. These are "standard" style motorcycles but do have some elements of the cruiser (stepped seat, increased fork angle, extra chrome).

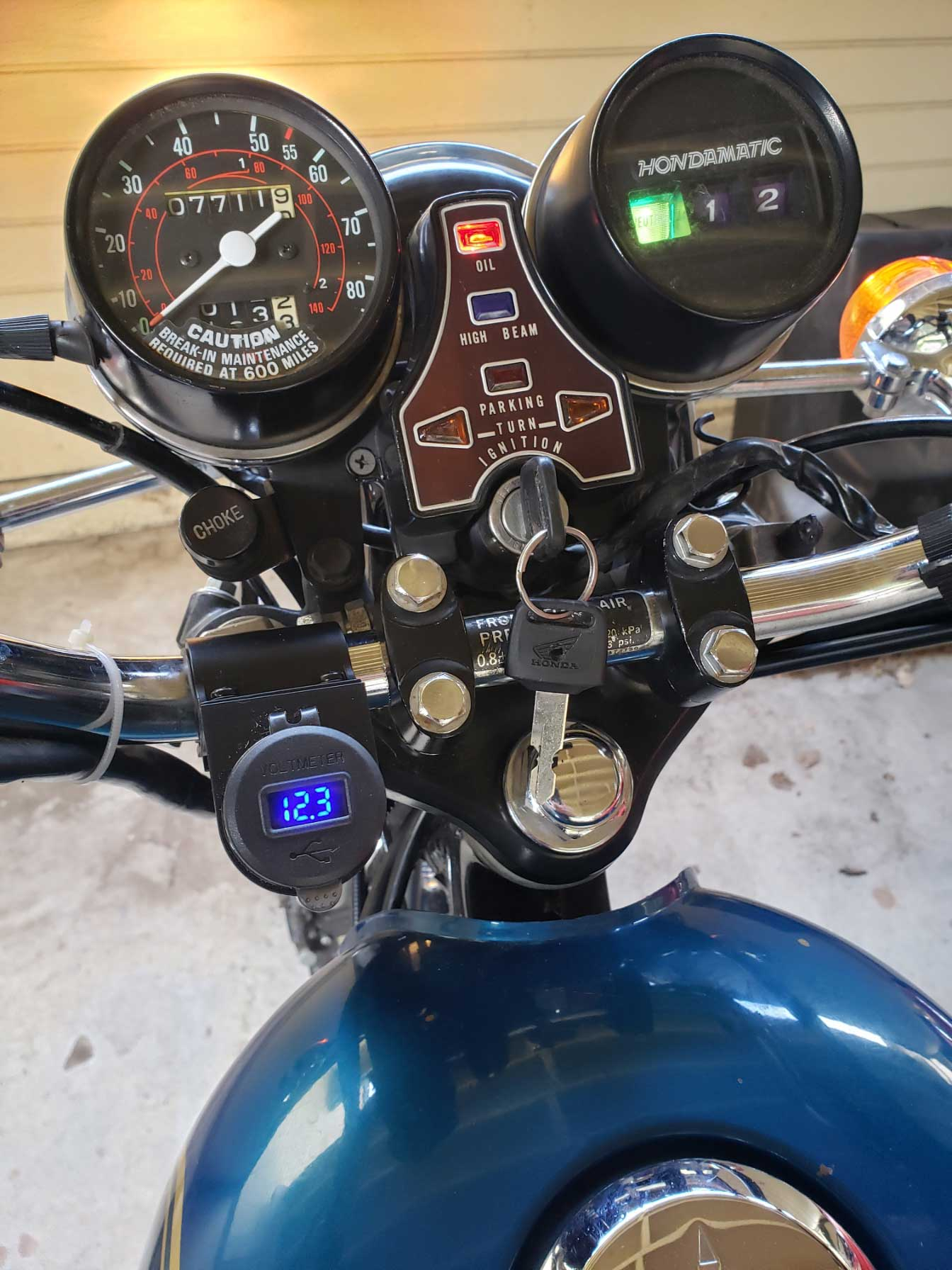
1981 cm400a dash

The CM400 series includes only a speedometer and three indicator lights (neutral, oil pressure, high beam) with a tachometer for the C and T models. The A (automatic) model has a gear indicator (N/1/2) in place of the tachometer and an additional indicator light for the parking brake, which is used since the A models have no manual clutch. The E (economy) model had wire wheels and drum brakes, while the others had Comstar wheels and a front disc/rear drum braking setup. While not particularly powerful, the CM400's handling makes it a suitable starter bike. Top speeds range from 85 to 95 MPH.

Many engine components are common with the Honda CB400T models from the same year. The parallel twin engine has three valves per cylinder (two intake, one exhaust) and a five-speed manual or two-speed automatic transmission using a torque converter. In 1982, the CM engine was bored out to a 447 cc (27.3 cu in) engine and the series was renamed CM450

In the 1984 film Purple Rain, Prince, in the role of The Kid, rode a customized Honda CM400 and he is also seen with it on the cover to the soundtrack of the same name.
