= Honda CB450DX-K =

Honda CB450DX
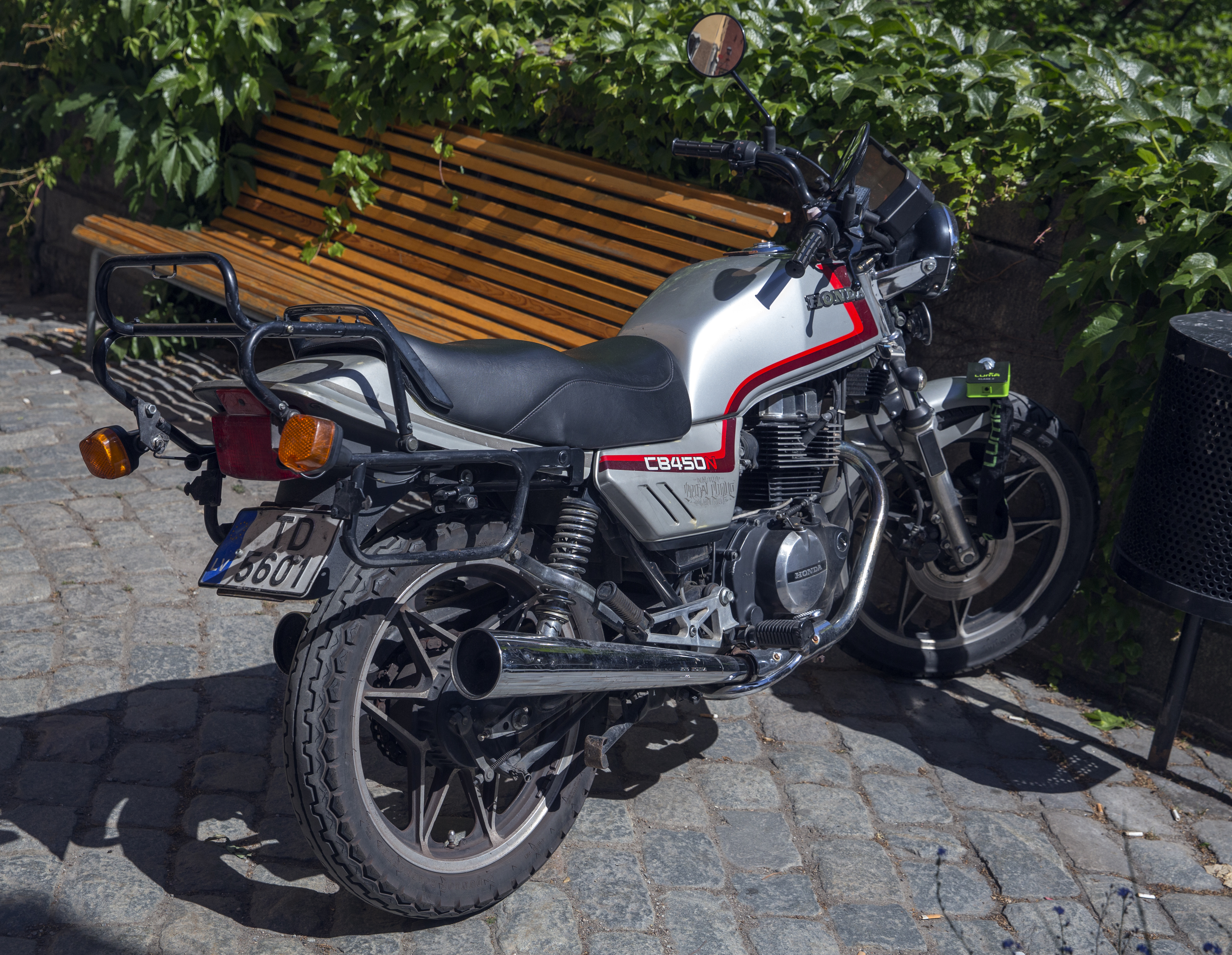
- Manufacturer: Honda Motor Company
- Production: 1989–1992
- Predecessor: Honda CB400N
- Successor: Honda CB500 twin
- Engine: 447 cc (27.3 cu in), air-cooled, SOHC six valve parallel twin
- Bore / stroke: 75 mm × 50.6 mm (2.95 in × 1.99 in)
- Ignition type: Capacitor discharge electronic ignition, electric start
- Transmission: 6-speed manual, chain final drive
- Brakes: Disc front and rear

The Honda CB450DX or CB450N is a motorcycle produced by Moto Honda da Amazonia Ltda from 1989 to 1992.

With its 450cc engine derived from the original Superdream CB400N, it proved to be a big seller in Brazil and South America where the earlier Superdreams sold well, too, due to their low running costs and good reliability. Honda decided to build upon this legacy with the 450DX; however, it did not sell in great numbers in the rest of the world due to poor build quality and a few inherited design problems from the Superdream.

Honda replaced it with the all new Honda CB500 twin in 1994.

The 447 cc (27.3 cu in) parallel twin motor produces a claimed 43 bhp (32 kW), and was derived from the Superdream. The bike has a manufacturer specified dry weight of 189 kg (417 lb). It has a 6-speed manual gear box, and is chain driven.

It was quite advanced in some ways, using hydraulic disc brakes both at the front and back as well as a 6-valve head. In other ways, however, it was harking back to the late 1970s with its retro styling, semi automatic camchain tensioner and balancer system.

The bike is a popular beginner bike, due to its low cost used, and easy maneuverability.
