= Honda CX series =

Series of motorcycles

CX series
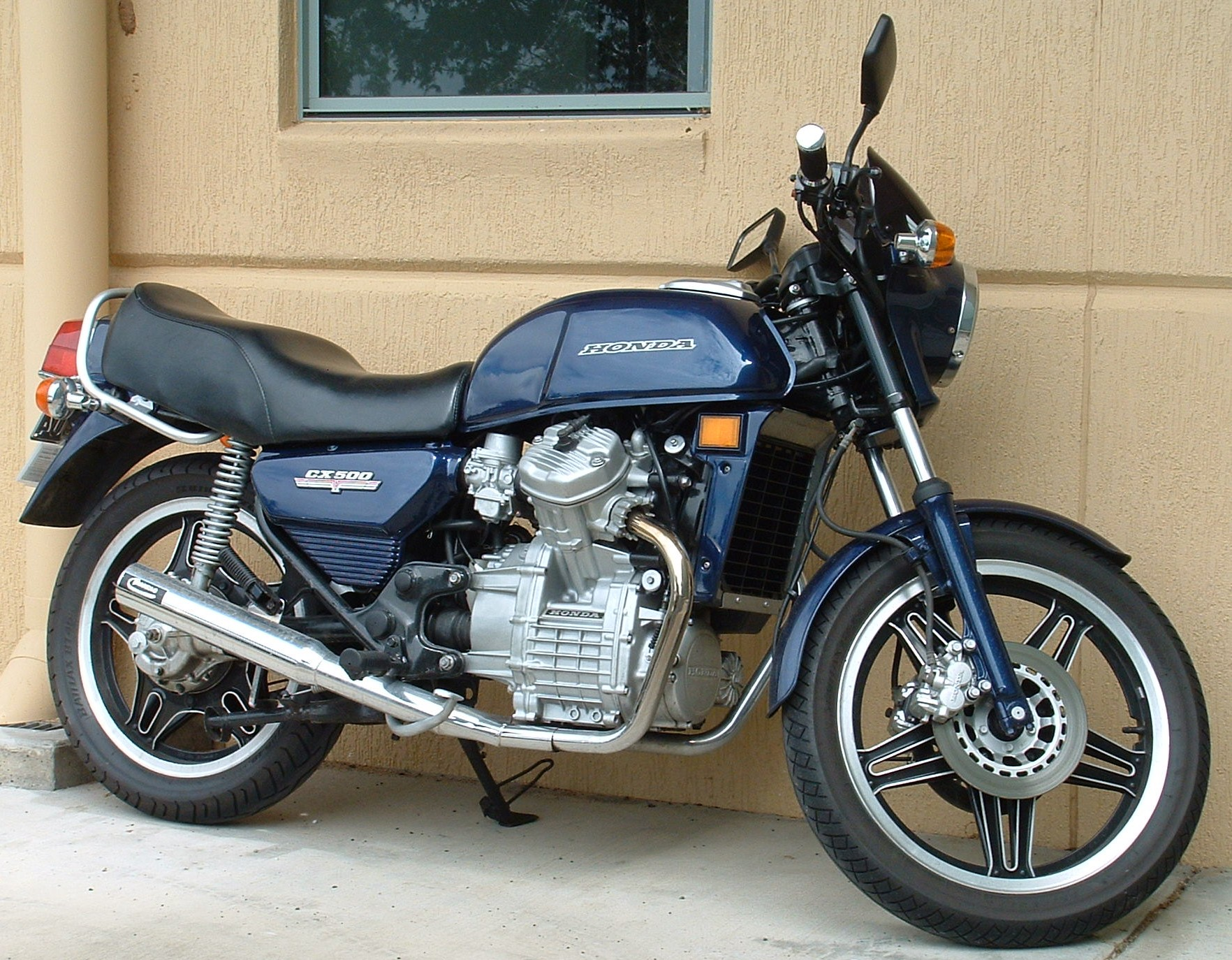
- 1981 Honda CX500 (B-spec with minor modifications from standard)
- Manufacturer: Honda
- Production: 1978–1983
- Successor: GL500 Silverwing, ST series (influenced)
- Engine: 497–674 cc (30.3–41.1 cu in) liquid-cooled longitudinal OHV 80° V-twin, 4 valves per cylinder
- Bore / stroke: 78 mm × 52 mm (3.1 in × 2.0 in); 82.5 mm × 63 mm (3.2 in × 2.5 in)
- Power: 48 hp (36 kW) CX500 82 hp (61 kW) CX500 turbo 77 hp (57 kW) CX650 100 hp (75 kW) CX650 turbo
- Ignition type: Electric start
- Brakes: twin discs (front); single disc (rear)

The Honda CX series motorcycles, including the GL500 and GL650 Silver Wing variants, were developed and released by Honda in the late 1970s, with production ending in most markets by the mid-1980s.

The design included innovative features and technologies that were uncommon or unusual at the time such as liquid cooling, electric-only starting, low-maintenance shaft drive, modular wheels, and dual CV-type carburetors that were tuned for reduced emissions. The electronic ignition system was separate from the rest of the electrical system, but the motorcycle could only be started via the start button.

== Power train ==
=== Engine ===
The CX series features a longitudinal engine configuration, similar to a rear wheel drive automobile. Unlike the flat twins produced by BMW, the cylinders protrude at an angle above the horizontal. The included angle of the CX is 80°, and the heads are twisted 22° so that the inlet tracts do not interfere with the rider's legs. A camshaft nestles at the base of the V between the cylinders. Although Honda generally favors OHC engines, the cylinder head twist necessitated the use of stubby pushrods to operate the four overhead valves per cylinder, with a forked rocker arm acting off each pushrod. The 5-speed transmission is located below the crankshaft, with both in the same housing, an arrangement which keeps the engine short but quite tall. The engine has a 10.0:1 compression ratio and 9,650 rpm redline. Just as with the Honda Gold Wing, the transmission rotates opposite to the engine to help counteract the engine torque's tendency to tip the bike slightly to one side when the throttle is opened or closed.

The CX was the first V-twin engine motorcycle that Honda ever built. It was initially designed as a 90 ° V-twin. Honda built a prototype CX350 but it was never released to the public. In that version the cylinder heads did not have the cylinder-head twist.

=== Transmission ===
Final drive is with a shaft. Power is transferred by an enclosed splined driveshaft with one universal joint. The shaft drives a bevel gear to which the wheel is joined via a cush-drive, which absorbs and dampens driveline shocks and vibrations. The bevel drive spins in an oil bath, and a grease-nipple is provided for greasing the shaft bearing.

=== Wheels ===
The ComStar wheels combine the flexibility of spoked wheels with the strength and tubeless characteristics of one-piece wheels. Honda introduced the Com-Star wheels a year or so earlier on the CB250T/400T Dream as well as on the CB750F2 and GL1000 Gold Wing, although these featured standard rims that required inner tubes. The CX500 was the first production motorcycle to use tubeless tires.

== Chassis ==
Early versions had conventional suspension, consisting of hydraulically damped telescoping front forks and dual coil-over shocks at the rear. Later versions had air-assisted forks and featured Honda's Pro-Link monoshock rear suspension. US bikes (except GL500I, GL650I and Turbo) were equipped with a single front disc brake whereas all other bike possess dual front disc brakes. Besides the 'vanilla' CX500B, models after 1980 sport dual piston calipers replacing the single piston caliper of the earlier models. For the Turbo and Eurosport models the rear drum was replaced with a dual piston caliper and disc. All models feature steel tube frames with a large backbone, with the engine used as a stressed member. The dual shock models use a single tube backbone whereas the later Pro-Link models employed a triple tube backbone.

== Variants ==
=== CX500 ===
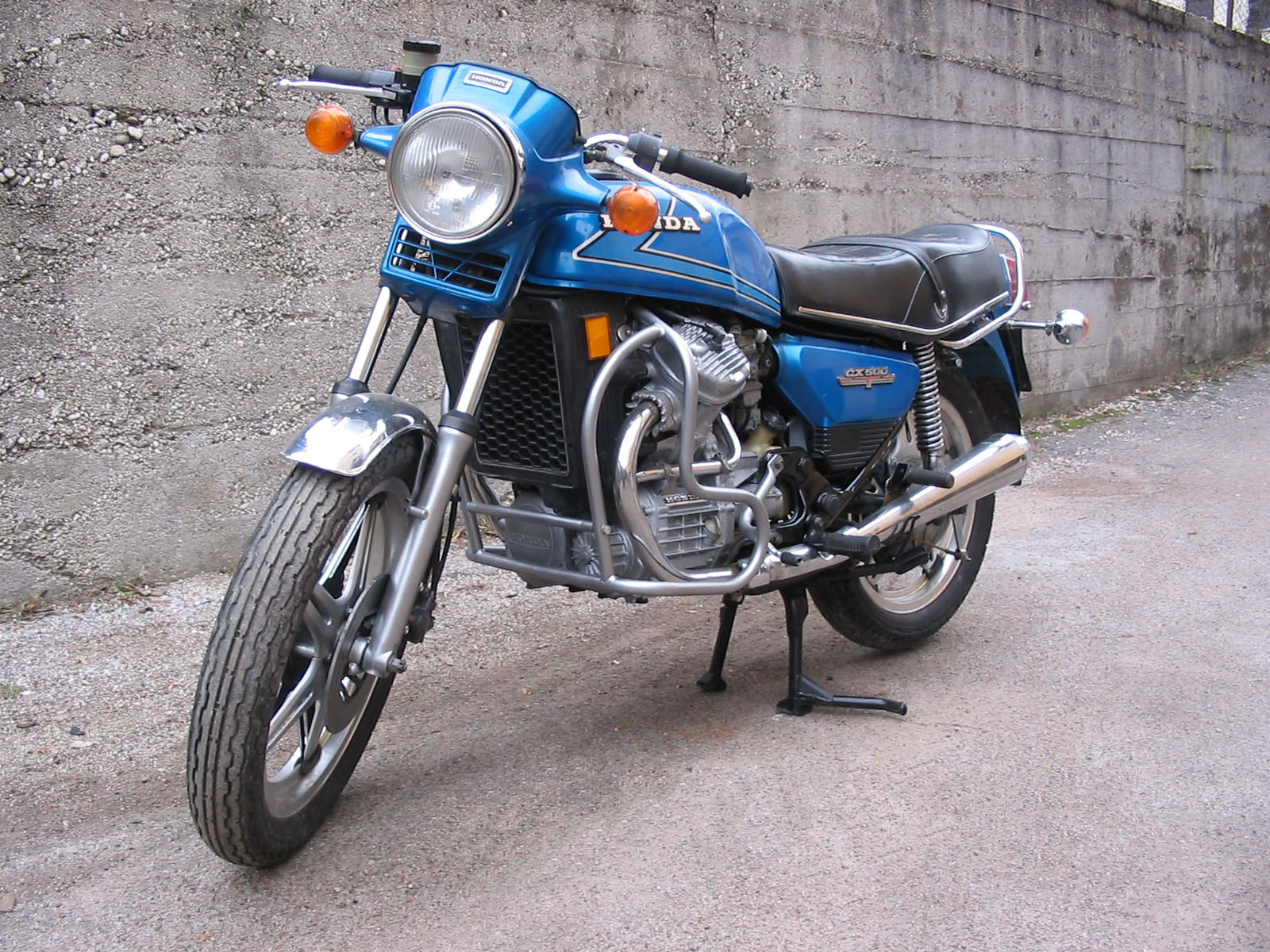
1979 Honda CX500

The basic 1978 48 hp CX500 had a large fuel tank, stepped seat, a round brake fluid reservoir and a plastic mini-fairing that was thought to look unusual at the time. Turn signals extend out through the mini fairing from the headlight's centerline. The CX500 Standard had silver Comstar wheels, 19 inch (front) and 18 inch (rear).

The trademark Moto Guzzi practice of mounting a V-twin engine with the crankshaft inline with the frame and shaft final drive was adopted for the CX500; but this Honda was decidedly different. Not only was the 497 cc engine water-cooled, but it had four valves per cylinder that were operated by pushrods rather than the overhead cams favored by Honda on its previous four-stroke engine designs.

The styling was radical: a steep fork angle and a short engine contributed to a stubby wheelbase on a bike that was rather tall. The CX500 was one of the first recipients of Honda's new Comstar wheels, of 19 in (480 mm) diameter (front) and 16 in (410 mm) (rear). Later, on B models, reversed Comstars and a square brake fluid reservoir were fitted.

The fuel tank tapered toward the front and a huge half-moon tail light jutted out from a short fairing behind the radically stepped seat. The result was a mix of standard, sport, and cruiser features.

=== CX500 Custom ===
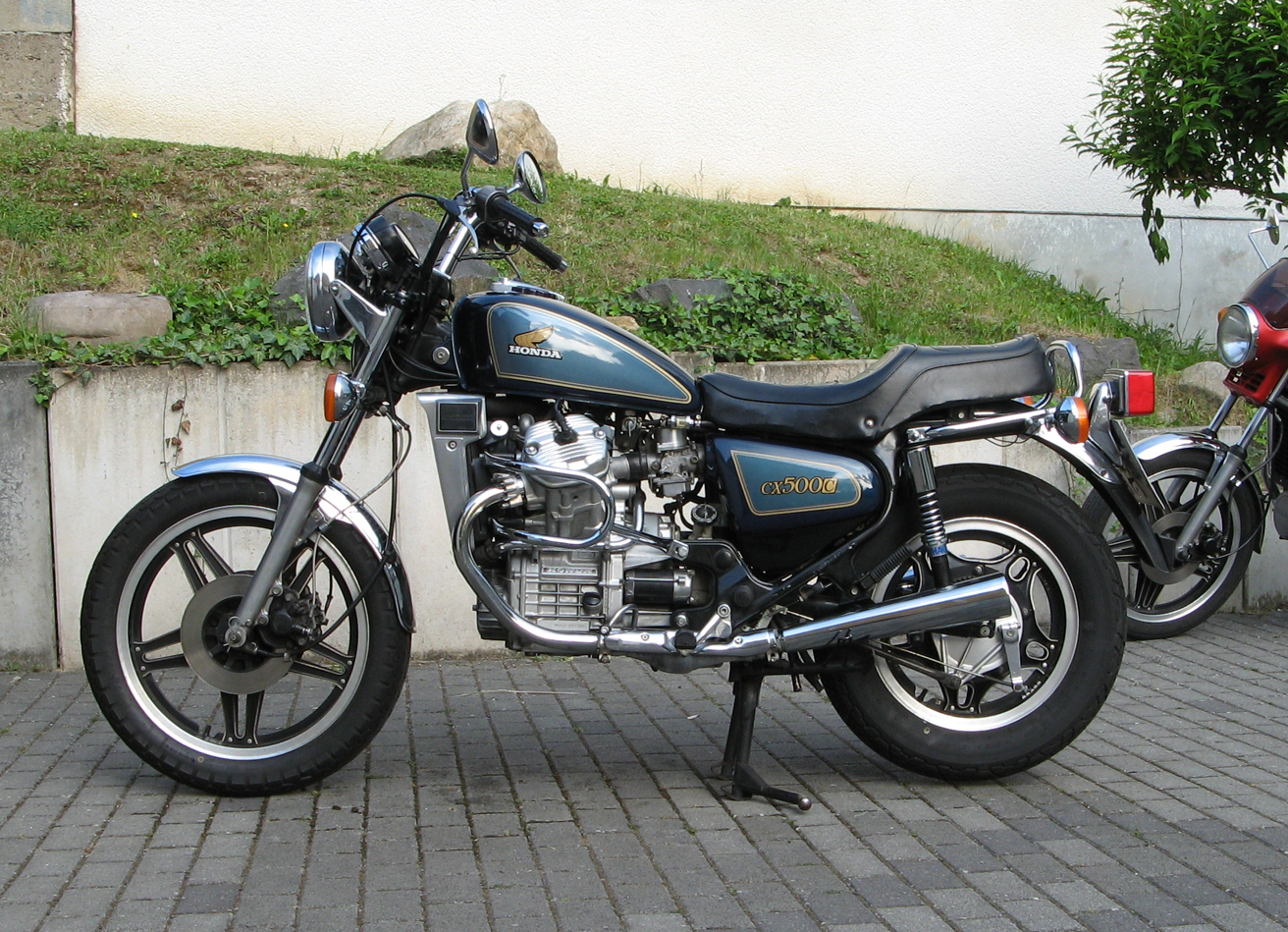
Honda CX500C Custom

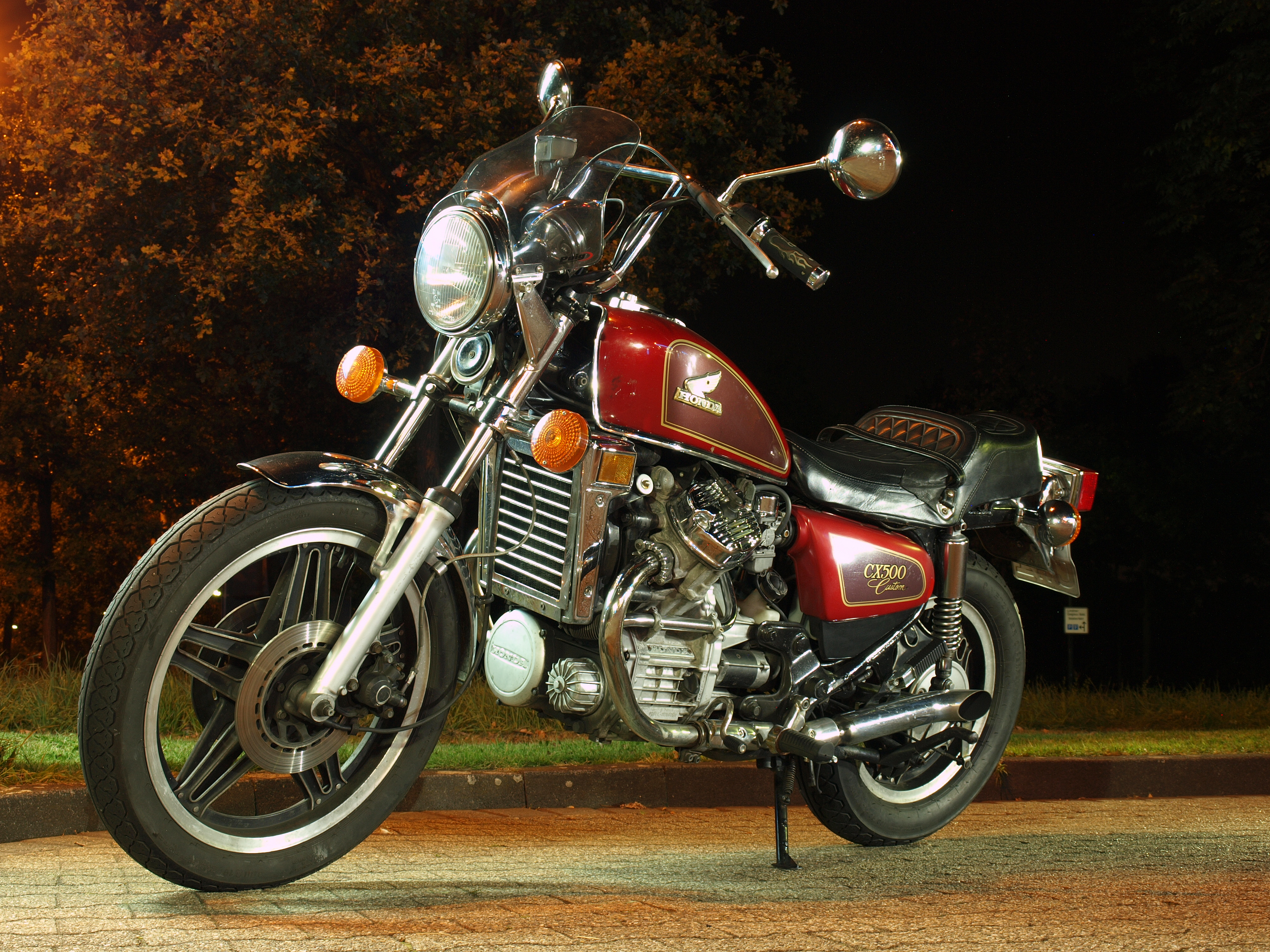
Honda CX 500 C

The "Custom" variant, introduced in 1979, had a smaller, narrower tank and buckhorn handlebars. The headlight and gauges were similar to the CX500 Deluxe. Turn signals were mounted along the fork tubes, below the level of the headlight. 1982 was the last model year for the CX500. In 1983 it was bumped up to 673 cc and became the CX650. The CX650's styling was different, and the engine was painted black instead of plain aluminium.

=== CX500 Deluxe ===
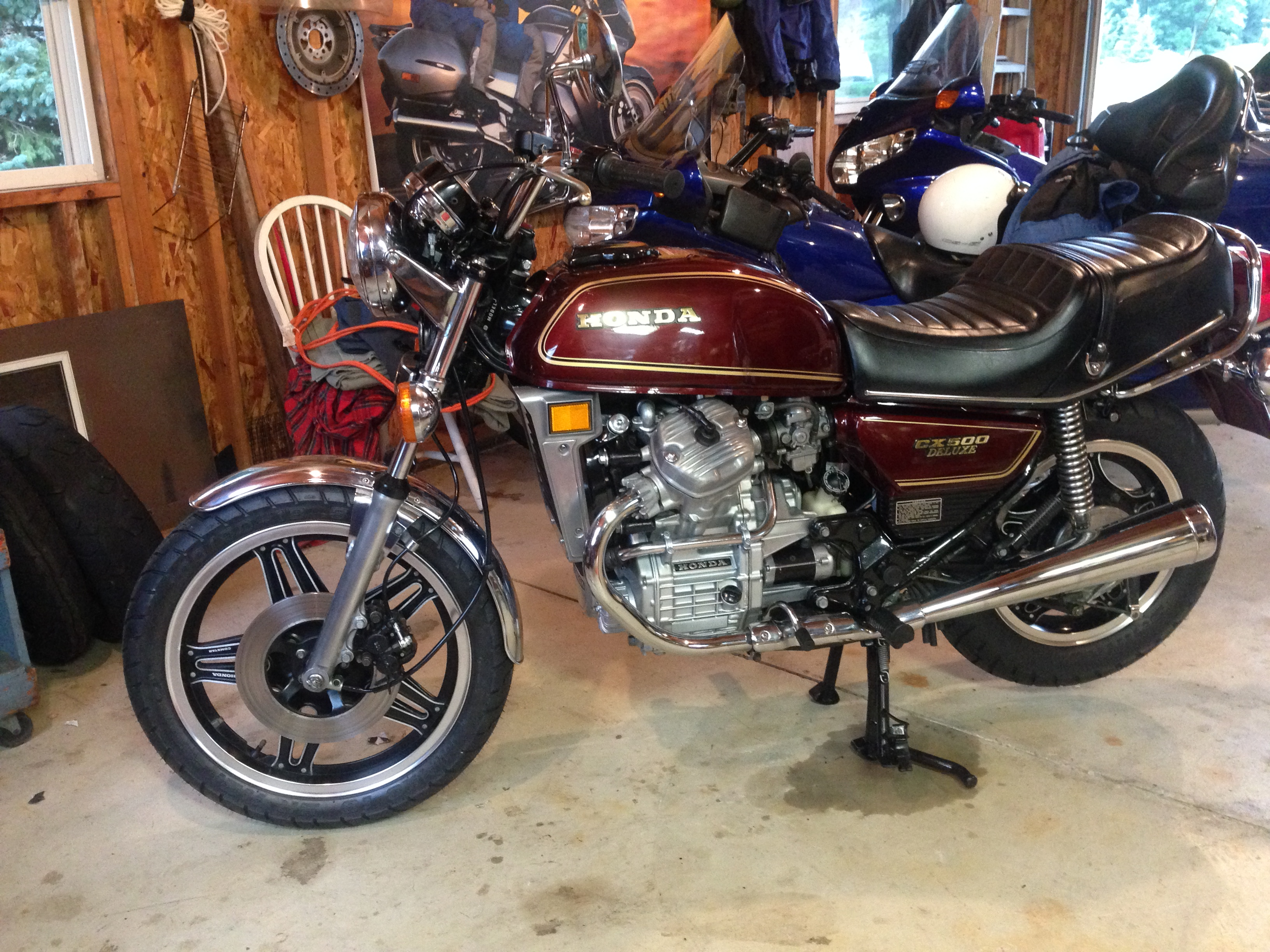
A 1979 Honda CX500 Deluxe

The "Deluxe" model appeared in 1979. This bike looked nearly identical to the original CX500 Standard, with the exception of regular (85 mph) gauges and headlight (the mini fairing was removed) and black reversed Com Star wheels - 19 inch front and 16 inch rear. 1981 was the final year for the CX500 Deluxe model.

The CX500 met with a good degree of success. It proved to be reliable and economical, being the least-expensive shaft-drive bike. Many examples still exist today, and along with the GL Silverwings, are fast becoming cult bikes. There are owners clubs throughout Europe and the rest of the world.

=== CX500EC Sports ===
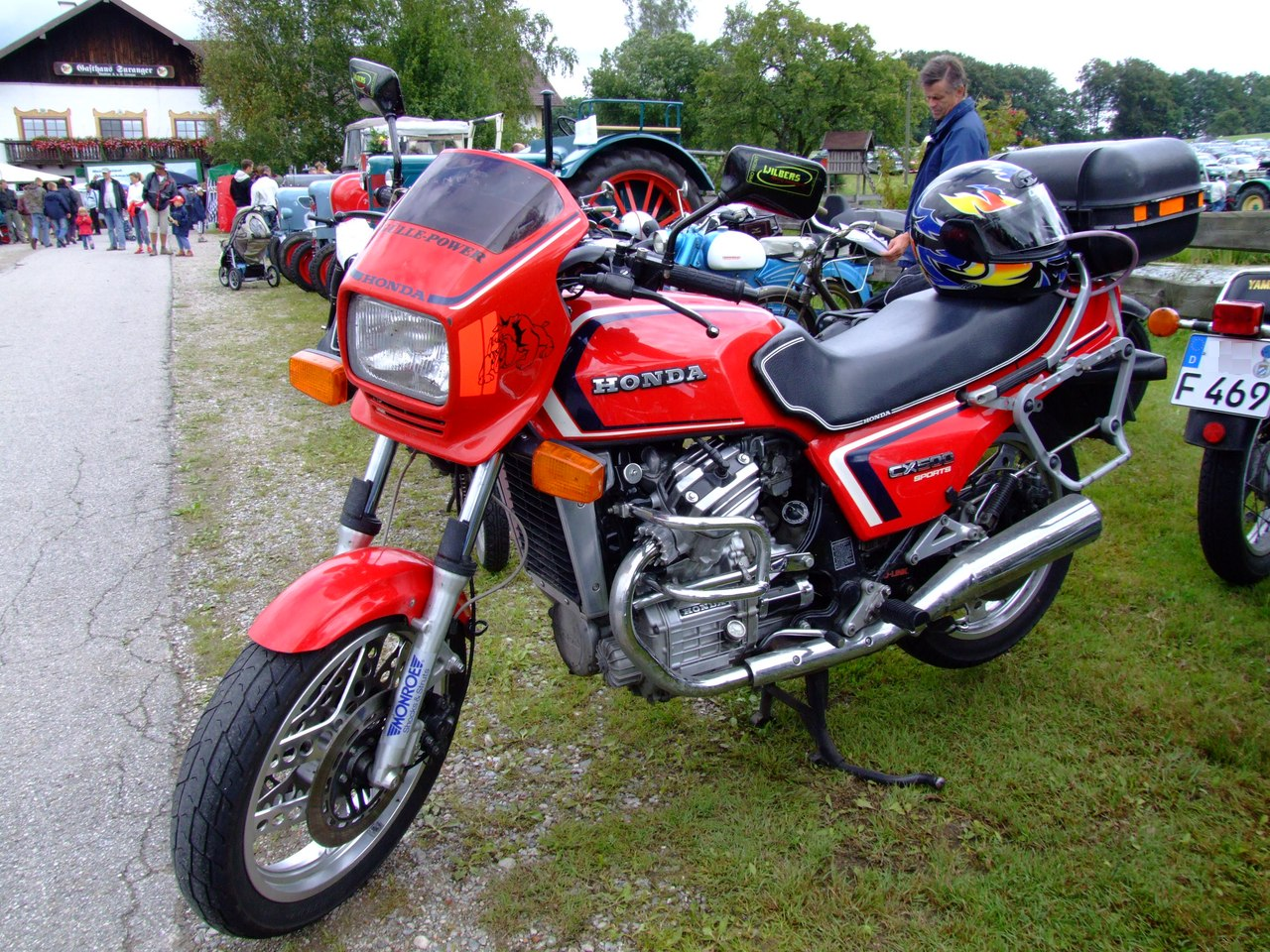
1985 Honda CX500 Sports

Introduced in 1982 the EC variant is a much improved motorcycle compared to the original 500. Sharing many parts with the CX500 Turbo introduced the same model year, the Sport (following the release of the CX650ED 'Eurosports', many people referred to the CX500EC also as the 'Eurosports' although technically not correct) features air pre-load assisted front forks with an anti-dive mechanism, known as TRAC (Torque Reactive Anti-dive Control), and an air pre-load assisted prolink mono-shock rear suspension. The wheels were also modified, with an 18-inch-diameter (460 mm) restyled round hole comstar with a 100–90H18 front tyre, whilst on the rear is a 120–80H18. The brakes are vastly improved with much more effective twin pot calipers on the front and a new disc brake with twin pot caliper on the rear replacing the original drum. The Sports is also significantly restyled with a larger fuel tank, a nose fairing, side panels, seat, and tail unit that share much more modern lines. In the UK only two colour options were made: white pearl with blue and red strips, or black with orange and silver stripes. The instrumentation is improved with the introduction of a fuel gauge and like the rest of the bike, a much updated appearance. Plastic mudguards replace the chromed steel versions on the earlier machines curing the associated rust problems. The round headlight of the early bikes is also replaced with a rectangular lens which gives improved night lighting.

The changes extended to the engine where Honda's late 1970s issues with cam chains were dealt with via the introduction of an automatic tensioner replacing the manual version on the earlier models. Other changes also meant that the standard valve clearances were reduced, possibly through tighter manufacturing control. Sports model engines are identifiable via the lack of a cam chain tensioner bolt and the revised valve covers which feature black painted stripes and satin alloy flat areas.

The changes made the 500 Sports significantly better to both look at and ride, and more reliable than the previous versions. The later CX650ED shared the majority of the cosmetic changes introduced by the 500EC, whilst in Japan a 400 cc version was introduced with the same styling to comply with licence rules.

=== GL500 Silver Wing and GL650 Silver Wing ===
GL500/GL650 Silver Wing
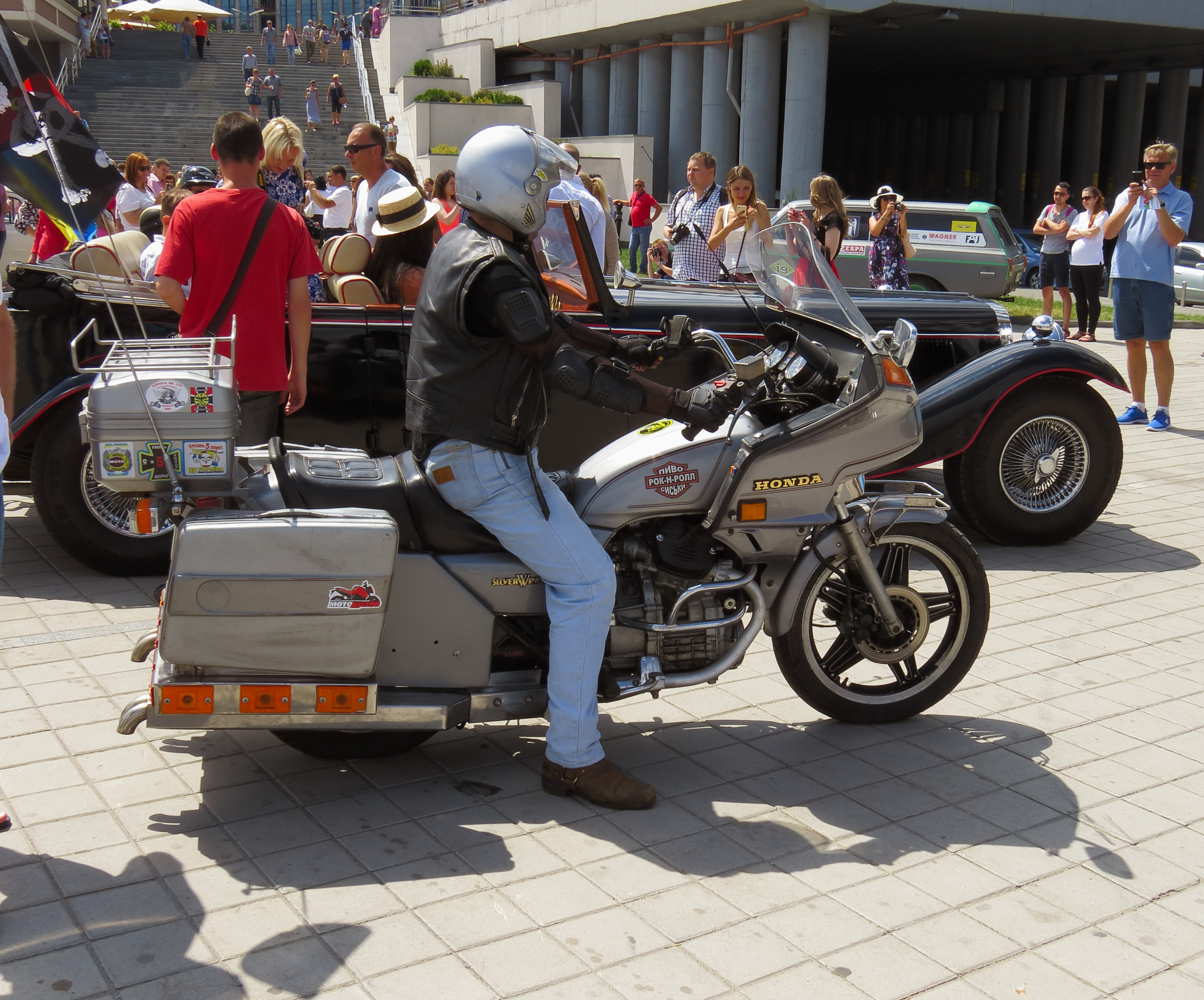
- Manufacturer: Honda
- Production: 1981-1982 (GL500); 1983 (GL650)
- Class: Touring motorcycle
- Engine: OHV, liquid-cooled V-twin engine 497 cc (GL500); 674 cc (GL650)
- Bore / stroke: 78 mm × 52 mm (3.1 in × 2.0 in); 82.5 mm × 63 mm (3.2 in × 2.5 in)
- Top speed: 180 km/h (110 mph)
- Transmission: 5-speed manual, shaft drive
- Suspension: Front: Air-adjustable forks Rear: Pro-Link
- Brakes: Dual front disc
- Wheelbase: 1496 mm (58.9 in)
- Seat height: 775 mm (30.5 in)
- Weight: 217 kg (478 lb) (dry); 242 kg (534 lb) (wet)
- Fuel capacity: 17.5 L (4.6 US gal)

In 1981 Honda released the GL500 Silver Wing, which was a mid-sized touring bike based on the CX500 engine. The GL500 engine was similar to the CX500 engine, but used the more reliable transistorized ignition system, which meant the stator would contain only charging windings and thus would put out more power for operating the lights and other devices commonly added to touring motorcycles. The GL500 also used Honda's Pro-Link monoshock rear suspension and was available as either a naked bike or as an Interstate model with fairing. The Interstate included a large factory fairing, hard saddlebags, and a trunk. This made the Silver Wing look like a miniature Gold Wing GL1100 Interstate. The 1981 model had a small tail trunk, which was replaced by a larger trunk in 1982. The trunk was interchangeable with the back seat—the bike is rider-only with the trunk installed, although there was an aftermarket extender available to allow the trunk to be mounted behind the passenger seat.

In 1983 the GL500 was upgraded to the GL650. Apart from the larger, 674 cc engine, the GL650 had a slightly different fairing mounts and front engine hanger mount than the GL500, and portions of the GL650 engine are painted black. The fuel economy of the GL650 was improved over that of the GL500 due to significantly taller gearing and the replacement of the CX/GL500's mechanical radiator fan with an electric fan. Claimed power was 50 hp (37 kW) for the GL500 and 64 hp (48 kW) for the GL650.

The CX-based Silver Wings were discontinued after the 1983 model year. Overproduction of the 1982 GL500 caused some to be sold new as late as 1984.

=== CX500 Turbo ===
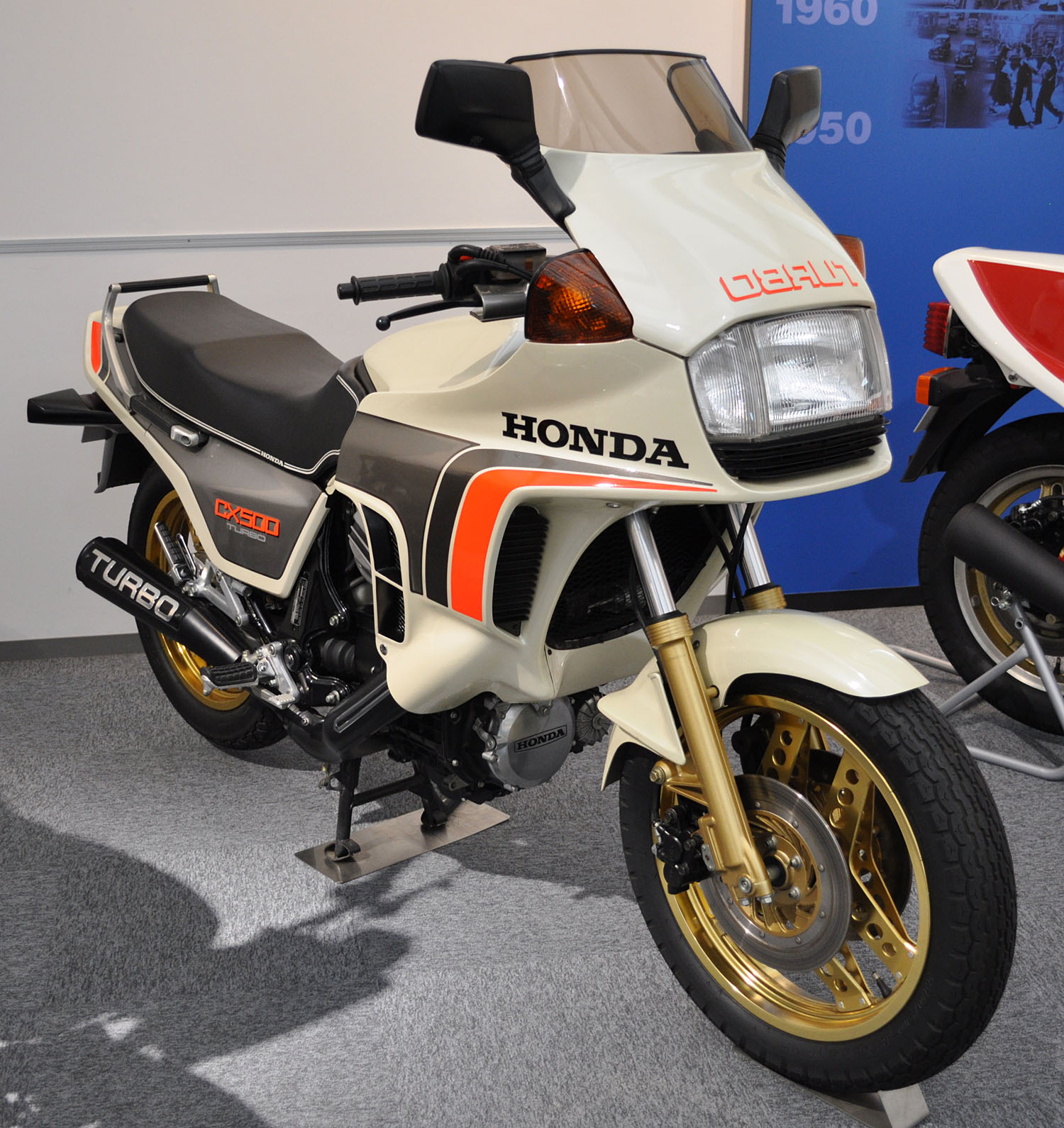
Honda CX500 Turbo in the Honda Collection Hall

The CX500 Turbo (also known as the CX500TC) was only produced for the 1982 model year. It was superseded by the CX650TD (CX650 Turbo; D=1983) for the 1983 model year, which also only lasted for one year. The 1982 CX500T was Honda's first production motorcycle to have a programmed fuel injection system, with redundant fail-safe systems working in tandem with a separate ignition system. Electronic system failures were reported to the driver through two dashboard displays: an issue with the fuel injection system would light a "Fuel System" light on the dashboard and an issue with the ignition would flash the "TURBO" indicator.

The CX500TC powerplant was based on the water-cooled V-twin, with four pushrod-operated overhead valves per cylinder, essentially the same configuration used in the CX500 introduced a few years earlier. The engine case styling was retained nearly intact from the original CX500. The turbocharger at peak boost provided approximately an extra 19 psi, nearly doubling the power output of the engine. The engine case was changed to accept the larger crankshaft bearings of the CX650 released in the same year, while the suspension, brakes, frame and fairing all differed significantly from the earlier CX500. Pro-Link rear suspension and TRAC (Torque Reactive Anti-dive Control) were also used on the CX500EC (released 1982) and CX650ED (released 1983) models.

=== CX650C ===
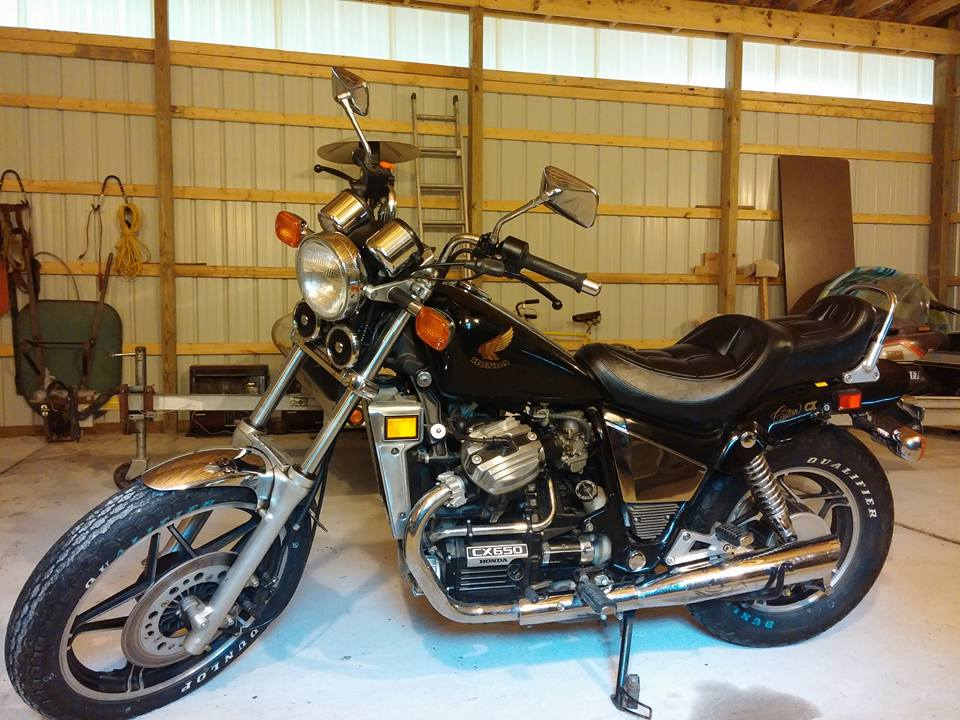
1983 Honda CX650C

The CX650 Custom was a one-year model produced in 1983 for the US market. Like other CX customs, especially the CX400C designed for Asia-Pacific, this model was a cruiser. The frame is completely different, and the styling was marketed to accommodate the American desire for the low stretched look of American cruiser bikes. Its semi chopped fork, tear drop tank, low seat and truncated exhaust gave it a very rakish look. However, it was very similar in styling and price range to the 750 Shadow and Honda elected to have only one cruiser bike in that class, thus the reason for its short model life.

=== CX650ED ===
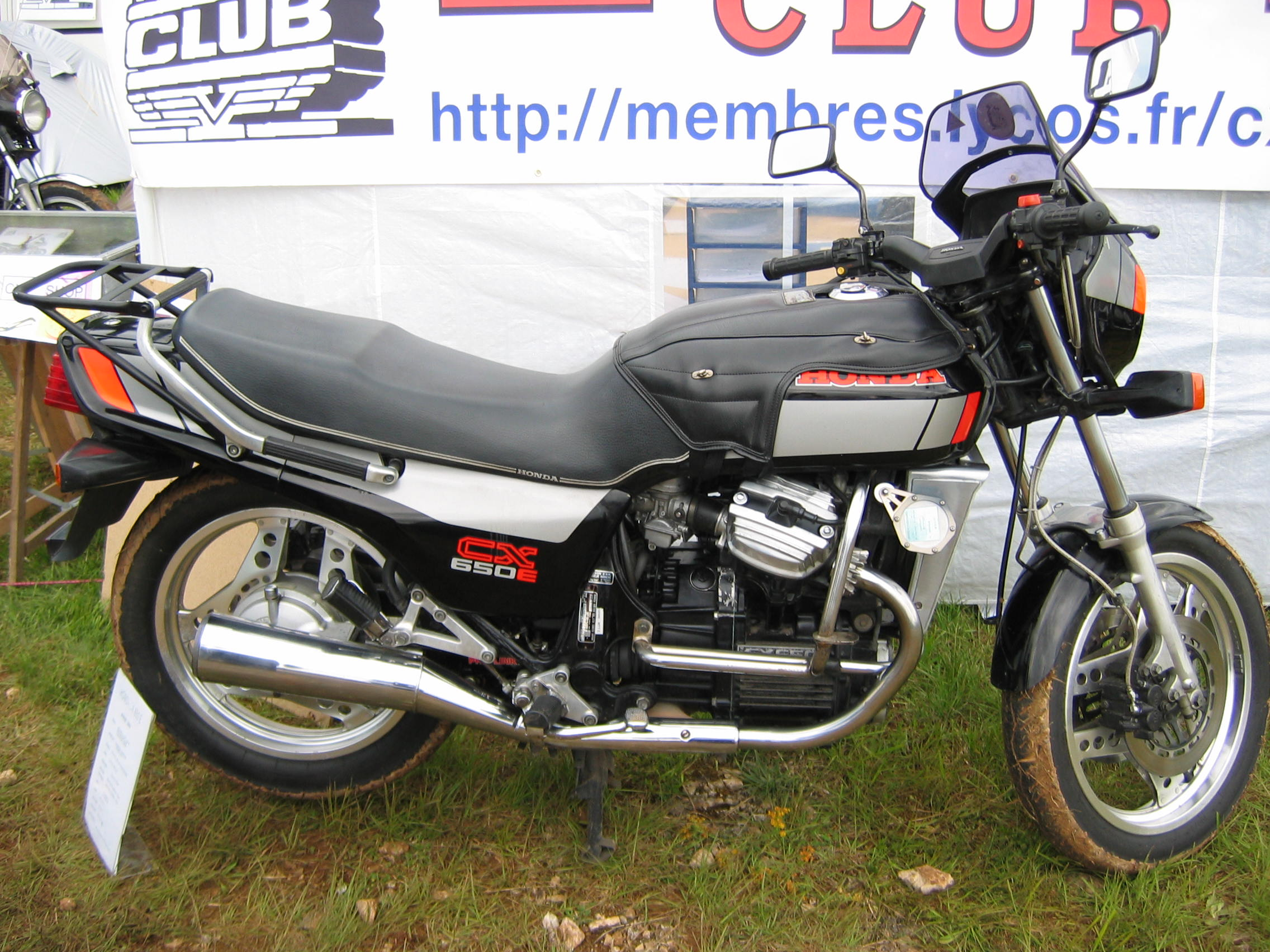
Honda CX650E

The CX650ED or Eurosport was also introduced in 1983 and was cosmetically very similar to the CX500EC Sports produced the previous year. It was aimed at the UK, European, Canadian, and Australian markets. The brakes, suspension and handling were advanced in comparison to CX500 variants. The model shares many common features with the CX500TC. Tubular frame design, TRAC anti-dive forks, Pro-Link rear suspension, twin-pot brakes and disc front and back. Though this model was not sold in the US, some have been imported by private owners.

=== CX650T ===
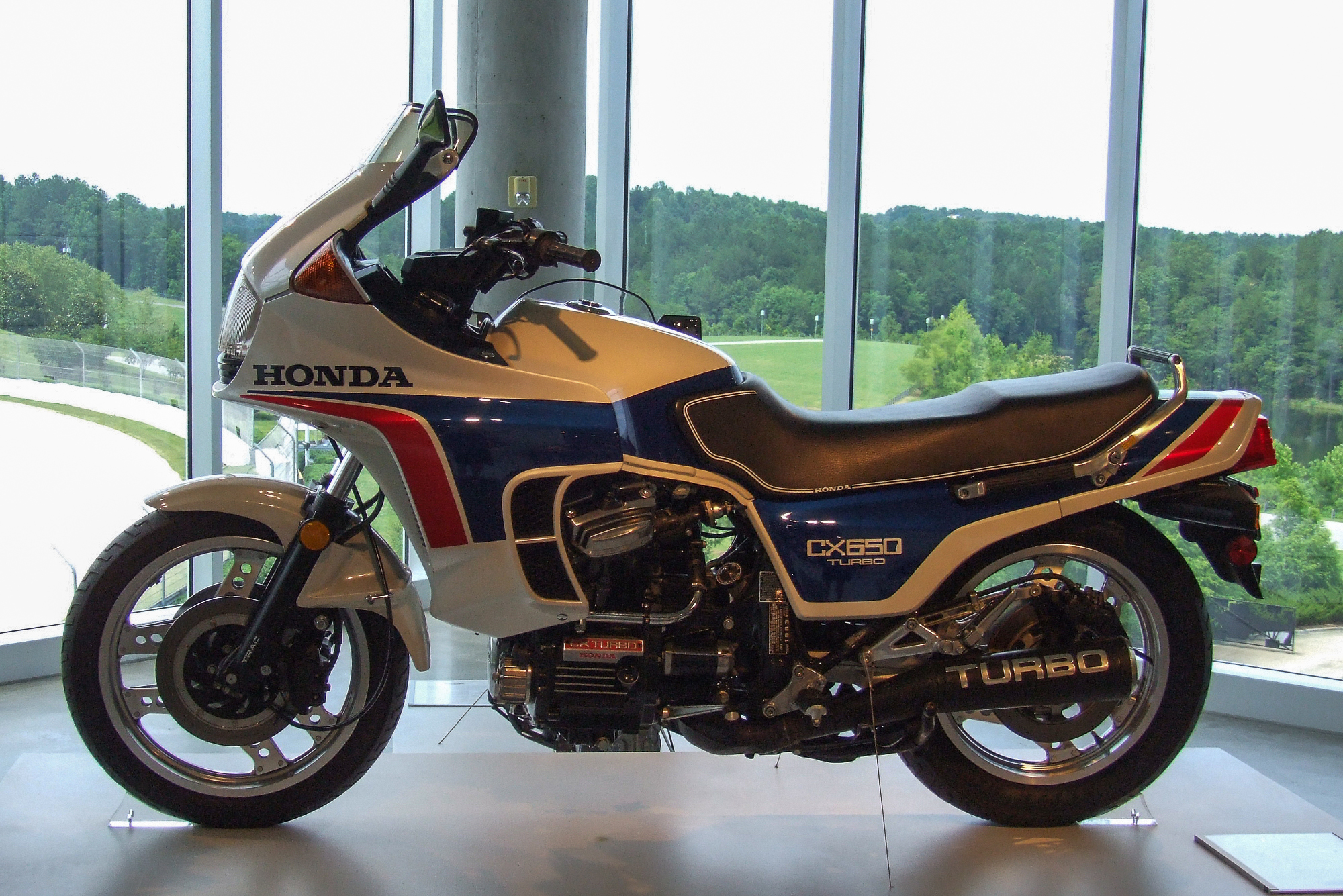
1983 Honda CX650 Turbo displayed at the Barber Vintage Motorsport Museum

For the 1983 model year, the engine of the CX500 Turbo was increased to 673 cc, together with an increase in power. In addition to the increase in displacement, the compression ratio was increased and the maximum boost pressure was lowered thus making for a smoother transition from off-boost to on-boost. The fuel-injection control system was substantially revised for the CX650 Turbo, and the rear shock received an update as well by adding a manually operated damping control mechanism in addition to the "air" pre-load of the previous model.

Cosmetically, the CX650 Turbo differs little from its predecessor other than in colors and badging. However, in a cost-cutting exercise, Honda manufactured the 650 Turbo fairing from ABS plastic as opposed to the 500 turbo's GRP. Honda built 1,777 models, with fewer than 1,200 imported to the U.S. and Canada. Only 100 units were shipped to the UK with none being exported to Australia.

In the fall of 1982, it was Honda's intent to provide a singular new CX650T to each American Honda Dealership for sale. Sales were lackluster due to the bikes high retail cost and expensive insurance rates. At years end, dealerships located in the Midwest began shipping unsold bikes to California where the bike was more popular and could be sold.

=== Other variants ===
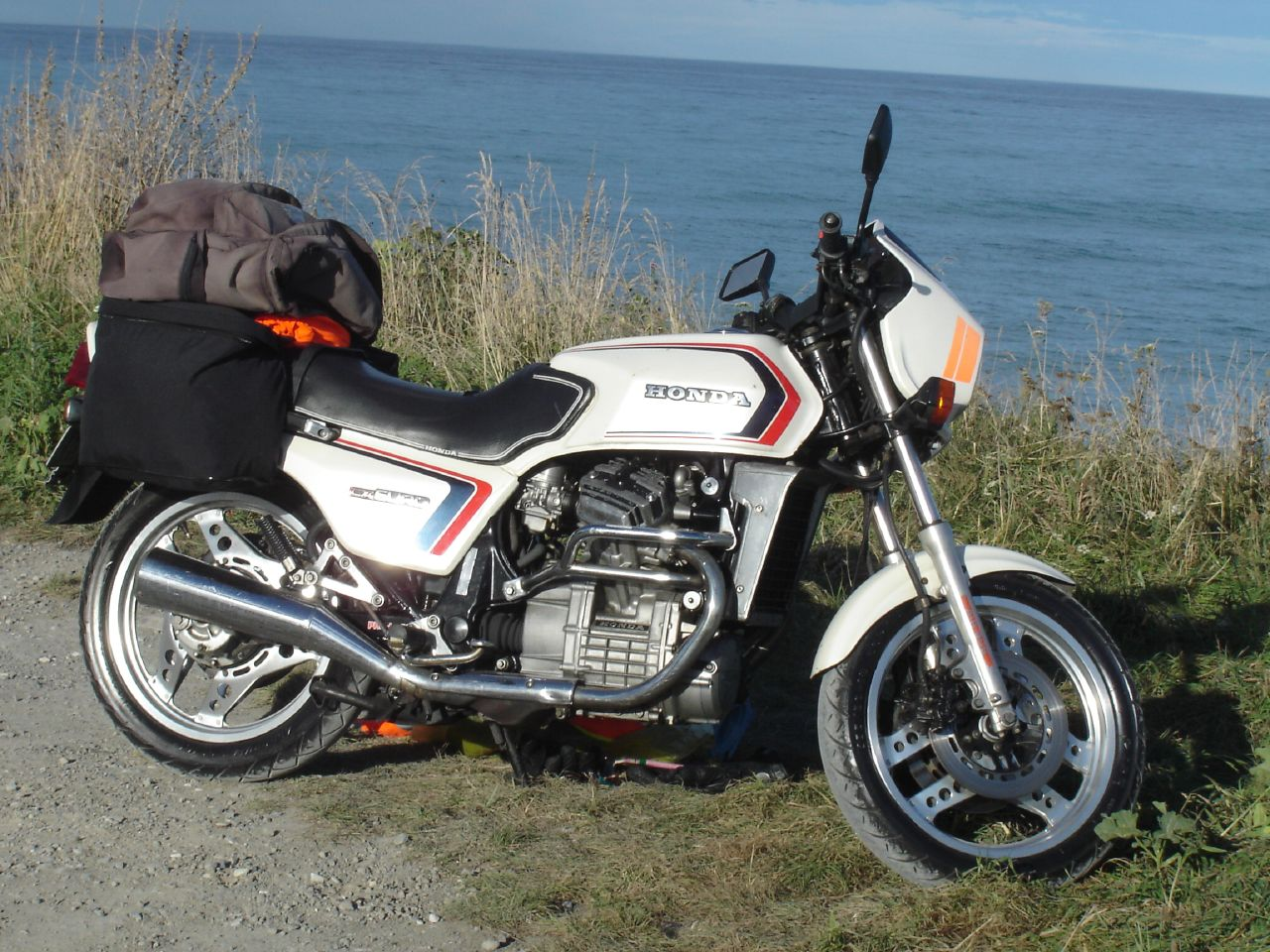
Honda CX Euro 400

The Japanese and European market saw 400 cc versions of the CX and GL, aptly named the CX400 and GL400. In Japan the GL650 SilverWing Interstate was released as the Limited Edition GL700 Wing Interstate, although it used the same 674 cc engine that was used in the GL650. Also in Australia, the 1980-1982 CX500 'standard' models were known as the "CX500 Shadow".
