= Inductive discharge ignition =

Type of ignition system

Inductive discharge ignition systems were developed in the 19th century as a means to ignite the air–fuel mixture in the combustion chamber of internal combustion engines. The first versions were low tension coils, then low-tension and in turn high-tension magnetos, which were offered as a more effective alternative to the older-design hot-tube ignitors that had been utilized earlier on hot tube engines. With the advent of small stationary engines; and with the development of the automobile, engine-driven tractors, and engine-driven trucks; first the magneto and later the distributor-type systems were utilized as part of an efficient and reliable engine ignition system on commercially available motorized equipment. These systems were in widespread use on all cars and trucks through the 1960s. Manufacturers such as Ford, General Motors, Chrysler, Citroen, Mercedes, John Deere, International Harvester, and many others incorporated them into their products. The inductive discharge system is still extensively used today.

== Faraday's law ==
The inductive-discharge ignition system operates according to the rules of electromagnetism described by Faraday's Law of Induction which states that the induction of electromotive force (emf) in any closed circuit is equal to the time rate of change of the magnetic flux through the circuit. In other words, the emf generated is proportional to the rate of change of the magnetic flux. More simply stated, an electric field is induced in any system in which a magnetic field is changing with time. The change could be changes in direction of force or strength. The effects described by this law are those by which generators, motors, alternators, and transformers function. There are two main concepts to be taken from Faraday's Law that apply to the design of inductive discharge ignitions. One is that when a wire and a magnetic field move relative to one another, an electric voltage and current will be induced into the wire, aka electromagnetic induction. The second is that current moving in a wire will induce a magnetic field around the wire.

== Magnetos ==
A magneto is one of the electromechanical devices invented for the purpose of ignition with gasoline internal combustion engines. A magneto at its most basic is a simple magnet that moves next to a wire, or sometimes a wire moves next to a magnet. As they move in relation to each other, the changes in direction of magnetic force induce an electric current in the wire. Usually the wire (called a primary wire) is very long, and looped around an iron magnetic core that more or less channels the magnetic field through the loop of wire. As the current flows, the wire loops develop their own magnetic field, which takes a certain amount of energy to form. The magnetic field is a type of potential energy. There is usually some sort of device that opens and closes the circuit called a contact breaker, points or an ignitor. As the points or ignitor open, the current ceases flowing, and the magnetic field collapses. The energy stored in the magnetic field is released in the form of increased electric voltage in the wire. This voltage jumps across the gap of either the ignitor or a spark plug located in the combustion chamber and ignites the air–fuel mixture to do work.

Some magnetos have a second coil of wire located next to the first, called a secondary coil. This coil is usually much longer than the primary loop, accomplished by many more loops around the magnetic core. As the magnetic field is built, it induces a current in the secondary coil as well. When the contact breaker opens the circuit, the magnetic field collapses, causing a high electric voltage in the primary and secondary coils. However, due to the greater number of turns of the secondary coil, the voltage is much higher, causing a larger spark at the ignitor or spark plug, meaning more assured ignition.

Due to their reliability, magnetos are used as ignition systems on aircraft. They are also used on machinery that do not have a separate electric supply or battery. They are also used on drag race cars because they offer a weight advantage over systems that utilize a distributor and battery.

== Distributor ignition systems ==
As ignition technology developed, engineers realized that a functional ignition system could be designed that dispensed with the magnets altogether. By applying a current to a primary wire loop wrapped around an iron magnetic core, a magnetic field would be generated in the primary loop without the magnets. This magnetic field would induce a current in an adjacent longer secondary loop of wire. By opening the circuit in the primary loop, the collapsing magnetic field would cause a voltage to be induced in the secondary loop. This high voltage was carried or "distributed" by a distributor to each of the multiple spark plugs in a gasoline car or truck engine.

The most familiar version of this kind of system was invented by Charles F. Kettering in about 1909 and was known by some as the Delco ignition system. Later patent applications to the US Patent Office make reference to the "Kettering ignition system". This type of ignition system was used on automobiles, trucks, lawn mowers, tractors, chainsaws, and other gasoline-powered machinery with great success for many decades until the development of capacitive-discharge ignition systems.
