= Comstar wheel =

Composite motorcycle wheel

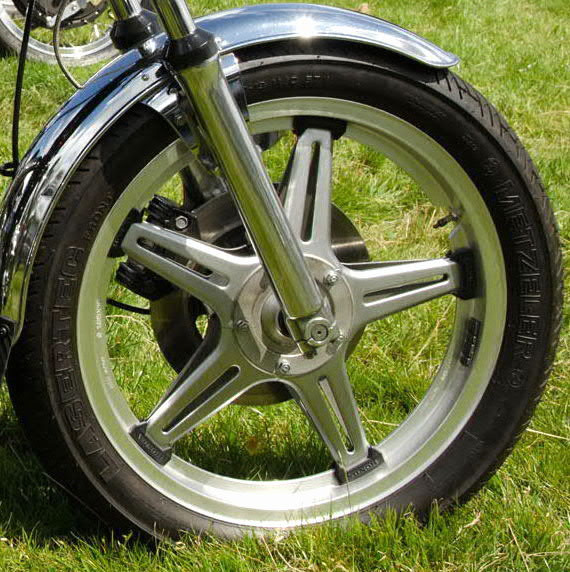
- First generation Comstar front wheel fitted to a 1978 Honda Hawk CB400A
- Inventor: Honda
- Inception: 1977
- Manufacturer: Honda (DID for rims)

The Comstar wheel, sometimes referred to as Com-stars or stylised as ComStar, was a composite motorcycle wheel that Honda fitted to many of its motorcycles from 1977 to the mid 1980s. Its design allowed it the option of being fitted with tubeless tyres and its use on the Honda CX500 was the first time tubeless tyres had been designed for a production motorcycle.

== Background ==
The Comstar was Honda's replacement for the tension spoked wheel. Whilst spoked wheels offered a degree of flexibility to help absorb road imperfections, they also required periodic maintenance to ensure correct spoke tension and required the fitment of an inner tube. Honda claimed the Comstar design combined the strength of a cast wheel but allowed a predetermined level of radial flex like spoked wheels. Comstar wheels also allowed the fitment of tubeless tyres which, like other alloy wheels, helped to reduce unsprung mass, although not all models fitted with Comstars had tubeless tyres.

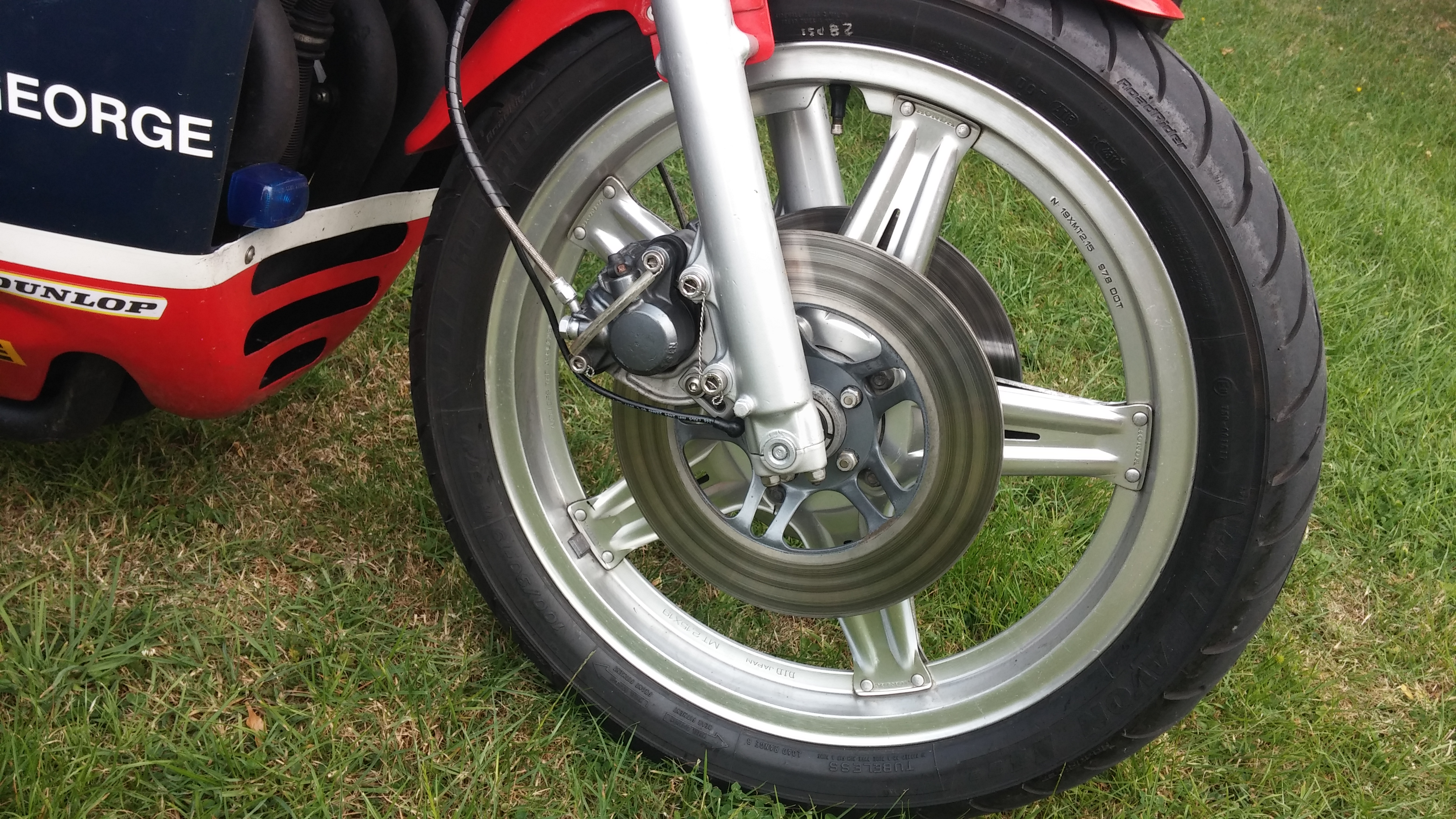
Comstar wheel on a Honda RCB endurance race bike

Honda debuted Comstars on their FIM European Motorcycle Endurance Championship winning RCB-941 production endurance race bikes for the 1976 season. Honda first fitted Comstars to its road going motorcycles in 1977 on models such as the CB400T Dream, CB750F2 and the later flagship CBX1000. A special lightweight version was also used on HRC's failed oval-piston four stroke GP motorcycle, the NR500, and the later NS500 two-stroke ridden by Freddie Spencer.

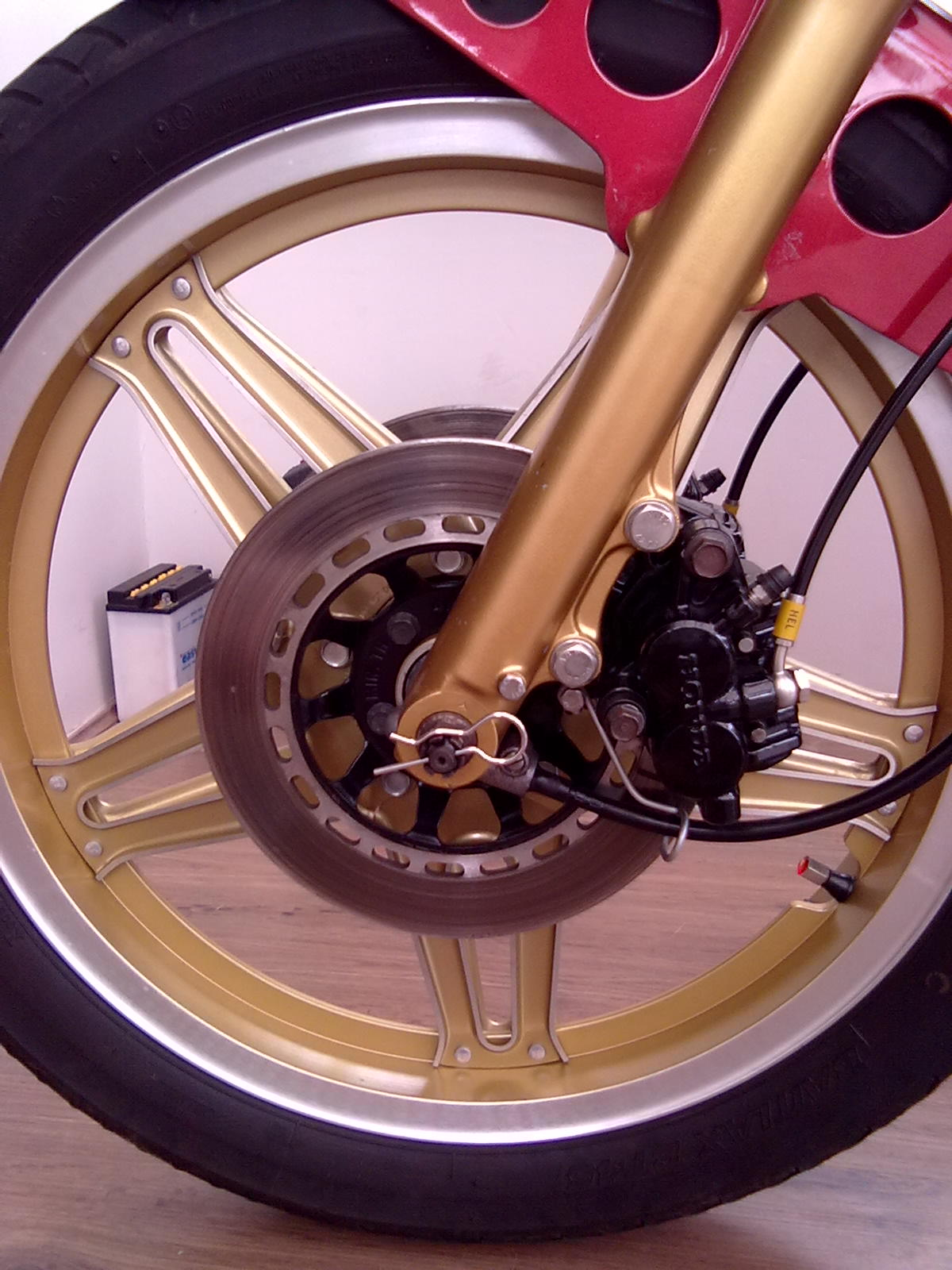
Third generation 'Reverse' Comstar front wheel on a 1982 Honda CB400NC Super Dream

Some later models came fitted with what were known as reverse Comstars. These had the spoke sections that looked as if they were assembled the other way round, hence the term "reversed". This style of Comstar was often given an anodized colour finish such as gold or black with silver detailing.

They were said to be hard to keep clean due to tiny crevices.

== Construction ==
To manufacture the Comstar wheels, Honda used an extruded aluminium-alloy rim made by D.I.D that was fastened to the spokes using aluminium rivets. The spoke pieces were bolted to the hub with steel bolt and nut fastenings in either three, five or six pointed star configuration. What metal the spokes were made from depended on the model of motorcycle. The CB400T, for example, used steel for the spokes and alloy for the rim, whilst the CBX and the Super Dream used alloy for both the spokes and rims to further reduce unsprung mass. For the NR500, the wheels were made from magnesium, with titanium used for the fasteners. This type wheel was considered "maintenance free" with no user serviceable parts, and Honda had "Do Not Disassemble" stamped on the wheel rim alongside other markings such as the fitment size. Composite wheels were also cheaper to produce than their cast alloy equivalents.

== Successor ==
From the early 1980s Honda had begun equipping newer models with cast wheels called ComCast stating "...that technology has solved the casting porosity problem and that cast wheels are now used on Hondas for styling and marketing reasons". ComCast wheels were a combination of pressed-together cast aluminium hub and spokes with a hollow extruded aluminium rim.

== Similar products ==
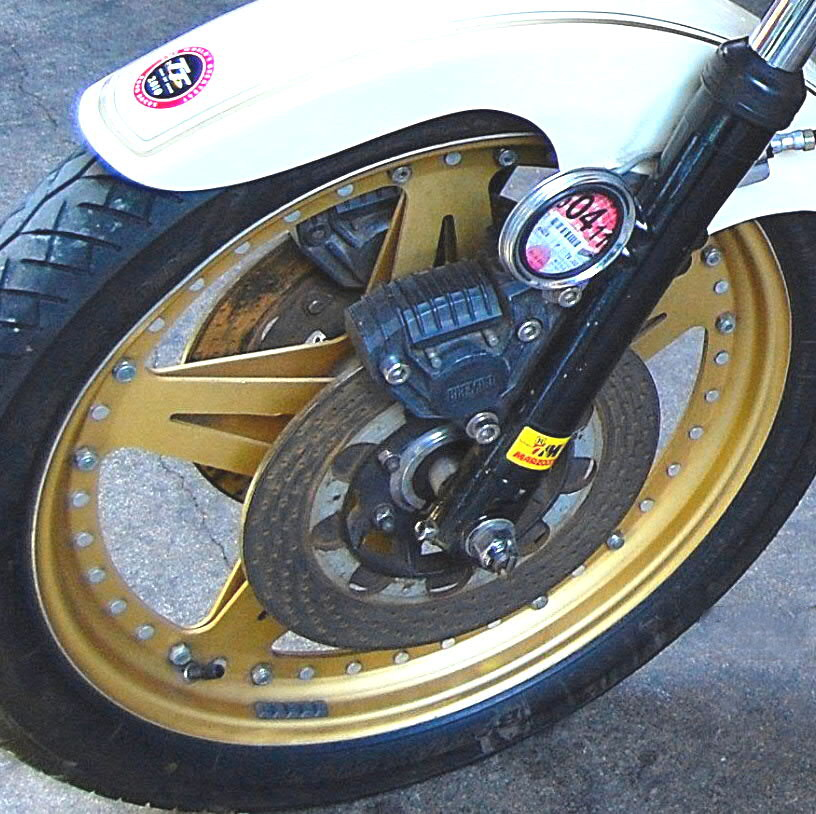
Astralite wheel fitted to an early 1980s Hesketh

From 1977, Dawson Harmsworth, a business in Sheffield, England, produced the "Astralite", a similar composite wheel with generally comparable appearance, materials and construction to Honda's Comstar. Initially intended for road racing applications, the wheel was specified for some models in the early 1980s Hesketh low-volume production road motorcycle range. Hesketh claimed the wheel was in development before Honda unveiled the Comstar, but that development had taken more time. In the 2010s, two decades after the original business closed, the wheel was manufactured again by a new business established by a former employee of Dawson Harmsworth.
