= Honda CB450SC =

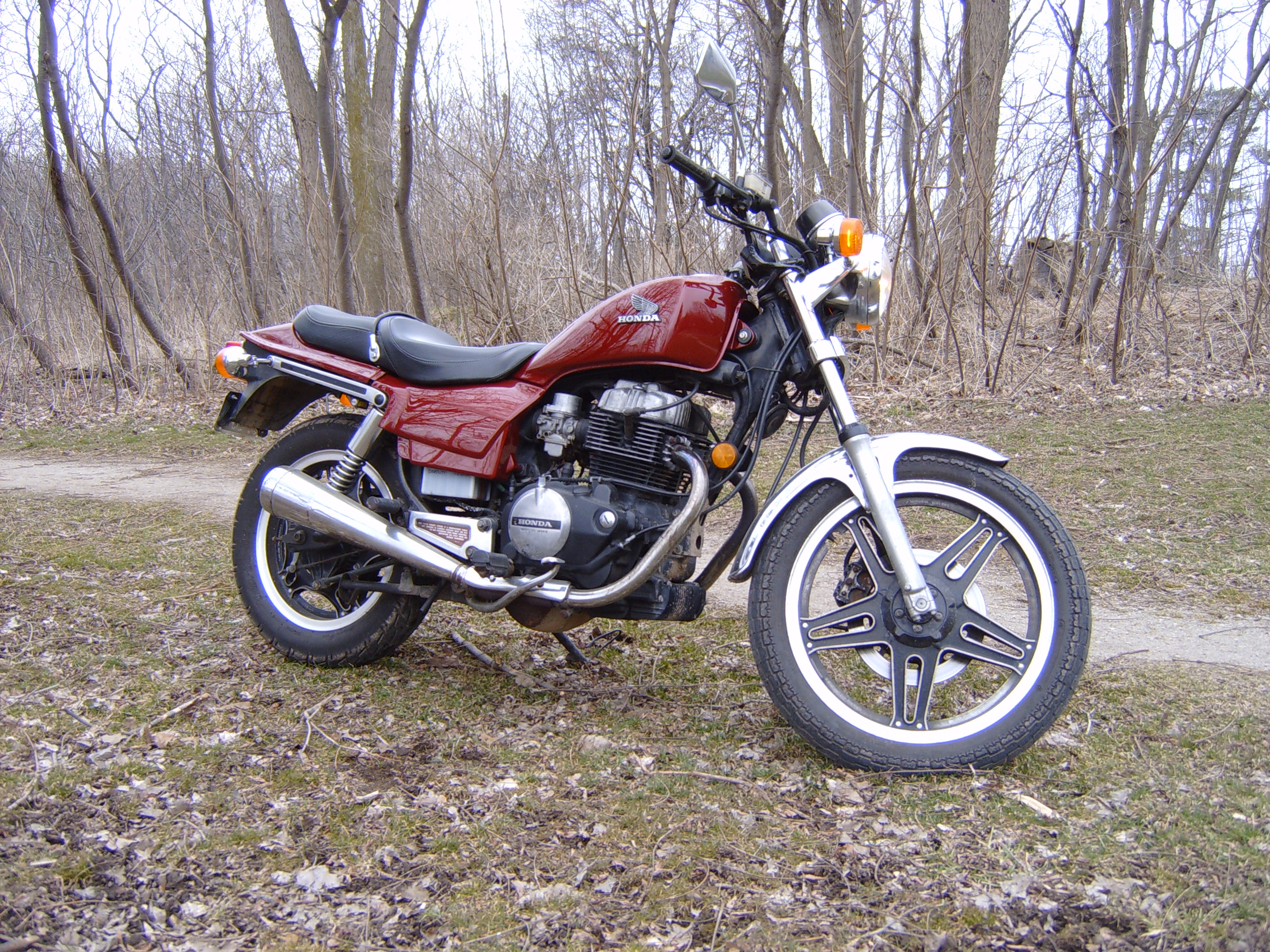
- 1982 Honda CB450SC Nighthawk
- Manufacturer: Honda
- Production: 1982–1986
- Class: Standard
- Engine: 445 cc (27.2 cu in), four-stroke, parallel twin
- Ignition type: Electric start
- Transmission: 6-speed, manual, chain final drive
- Brakes: F: disc R: drum
- Wheelbase: 57.1 in (1.45 m)
- Seat height: 30.9 in (0.78 m)
- Fuel capacity: 13.20 L (2.90 imp gal; 3.49 US gal)

The Honda CB450SC is a motorcycle produced by Honda between 1982 and 1986. It utilised a two-cylinder engine operating with two carburetors.

At launch, it came with an 85 mph speedometer and had Comstar wheels. Only cosmetic changes were made in 1983. The Comstar wheels were replaced with a slightly different cast alloy wheel. The speedometer was upped to 105 mph. Two Nighthawk 450 models were produced in 1985. The regular CB450SC, and the CB450SCL (California only). In 1986, its last year of production, the changes were minor, including the fender which was changed from chrome to "body color". Available options were: Nylon luggage (saddlebags, trunk bag, tank bag), leather saddlebags, engine guard, luggage rack and backrest.
