= Delco ignition system =

Inductive discharge ignition system

The Delco ignition system, also known as the Kettering ignition system, points and condenser ignition or breaker point ignition, is a type of inductive discharge ignition system invented by Charles F. Kettering. It was first sold commercially on the 1912 Cadillac and was manufactured by Delco. Over time, it was used extensively by all automobile and truck manufacturers on spark ignition, i.e., gasoline engines. Today it is still widely used in coil-on-plug, coil-near-plug and in coil packs in distributorless ignitions. An alternative system used in automobiles is capacitor discharge ignition, primarily found now as aftermarket upgrade systems. Electronic ignition was a common term for Kettering inductive ignition with the points (mechanical switch) replaced with an electronic switch such as a transistor.

== Operation ==

=== Power source ===
On initial start, a storage battery is connected through the ignition switch (called "Contactor" in the figure above). Once the engine is running, an engine-driven alternator or generator provides electrical power.

=== Breaker points ===
The breaker points (called "Contact breaker" in the figure) are an electrical switch opened and closed by a cam on the distributor shaft. This is timed so the points are closed for the majority of the engine cycle, allowing current to flow through the ignition coil, and are opened momentarily when a spark is desired.

=== Ignition coil ===
The ignition coil is a transformer. The primary winding (called the low-tension winding in early texts) is connected to the battery voltage when the points are closed. Due to the inductance of the coil, the current in this circuit builds gradually. This current creates a magnetic field in the coil, which stores a quantity of energy. When the points open, the current maintaining the magnetic field stops and the field collapses. Its stored energy is then returned to the two windings as electromotive force. The primary winding has a small number of turns and by Faraday's law of induction has a voltage spike develop across it of the order of 250 volts. The secondary winding has of the order of 100 times the number of turns as the primary winding, so develops a voltage spike of the order of 25,000 volts. This voltage is high enough to cause a spark to jump across the electrodes of the spark plug. Either polarity voltage spike may be used, but the spark is most efficiently initiated by a negative polarity pulse to the centre of the spark plug. That also lengthens the life of the spark plug.

=== Capacitor ===
There is a capacitor (called a condenser in earlier texts) connected across the points. The capacitor absorbs the voltage spike developed in the primary coil when the points open. This prevents an electrical arc from forming at the newly opened contacts on the points and thus prevents rapid erosion of these contacts.

=== Distributor ===
The distributor rotor turns in time with the camshaft. When it is time for a spark plug to fire, the rotor (the blue bar shown in the distributor in the figure above) connects the center electrode of the distributor cap to an electrode connected to a spark plug wire. This occurs simultaneously with the points opening and the coil delivering a high voltage to the center electrode.

=== Ballast resistor ===
Not shown in this diagram is the ballast resistor, which was included in Kettering's patent. It is placed in the primary circuit. The inductance of the primary winding limits the speed at which the current through it can increase to the necessary level to provide enough energy to create a spark. Lowering the inductance of the primary winding allows the current to increase faster, but would lead to a higher maximum current that will shorten the life of the points and increase heating of the coil. The ballast resistor placed in series with the primary winding creates a voltage drop proportional to the current. When the points initially close, current is low so voltage drop across the resistor is low and most of the battery voltage acts across the coil. Once current builds up, voltage drop across the resistor increases, leaving less battery voltage across the coil which limits the maximum current.

Kettering ignitions often had the ignition switch bypass the ballast resistor when in the start position. During starting the battery voltage drops, and bypassing this resistor allows a higher voltage across the coil so more energy could be delivered.

== Problems ==
One problem with this design is that, even with a properly sized capacitor, there will be some arcing at the points. Arcing causes the points to "burn." This in turn introduces resistance at the point contacts that reduces primary current and resulting spark intensity. A second problem involves the mechanical cam-follower block that rides on the distributor cam and opens the points. The block wears over time, reducing how much the points open (the "point gap") and causing a corresponding change in both the ignition timing and the fraction of time during which the points are closed. Tune-ups for older vehicles usually involve replacing the points and condenser and setting the gap to factory specifications. A third problem involves the distributor cap and rotor. These components can develop conductive "sneak paths" on their surfaces (also called 'tracking') across which the coil's secondary voltage produces a current, often in the form of an arc, that bypasses the spark plug. When sneak paths develop, the only remedy is replacement of the cap and/or rotor. A fourth problem can arise when one or more of an engine's spark plugs becomes "fouled." Fouling, caused by combustion-byproducts that form deposits on a spark plug's internal insulator, creates an electrically conductive path that dissipates the coil's energy before its secondary voltage can rise high enough to produce a spark. So-called capacitive discharge ignition systems create coil voltages with much shorter rise times and can produce a spark across spark plugs with some fouling.

Electronic ignition systems replace some or all of the components the Delco ignition system with solid state and/or optical devices and provide both higher voltages and more reliable ignition.
