= Hot-tube ignitor =

Device on early internal-combustion engines

A hot-tube ignitor was an early device that fit onto the cylinder head of an internal-combustion engine, used to ignite the compressed fuel/air mixture by means of a flame heating part of the tube red-hot. A hot-tube ignitor consisted of a metal or porcelain tube, closed at one end and attached to the cylinder head at the other and an adjustable burner that could be moved to position its flame at any point along the length of the tube.

== Operation ==
The hot tube usually enters the combustion chamber at the valve block, to the side of the main cylinder bore in a side-valve, and after an ignition event remains full of a small residue of spent gasses as the piston pushes the majority of such out of the exhaust valve. On the induction stroke, fresh charge cannot ignite arbitrarily as the hot part of the tube is shielded by these spent gasses. On the compression stroke, fresh (unburned) fuel/air mixture is compressed in the main cylinder, which also raises the pressure in the tube and means that the spent gasses therein are forced towards its end. When compression reaches a point that the fresh fuel reaches the red-hot area of the tube, ignition occurs. On early designs, ignition timing was adjusted by adjusting the position of the red-hot spot on the tube - the burner is moved towards the far end to retard ignition, and towards the base to advance. Most later styles used a fixed burner and varied tube lengths to change ignition timing.

== Disadvantages ==
Hot-tube ignitors had many problems, most caused by the sudden pressure changes in the tube because of the operation of the engine and the high temperature of the tube. It was extremely difficult to find materials that were both durable enough for these conditions and inexpensive.

Also important was never setting the burner flame where it would heat the tube white hot, which would rapidly damage the tube and could cause it to burst explosively. This mistake was made often.

The tubes used were typically 6 to 12 inches long, which tended to make them impractical for use on anything but large engines (e.g., stationary motors in factories). Tubes rarely lasted longer than a year before needing replacement, especially when the engines were fueled with high sulfur gases like unpurified producer gas or natural gas.

== See also ==
- Hot-bulb engine
- Hot tube engine
