= Capacitor discharge ignition =

Engine ignition system

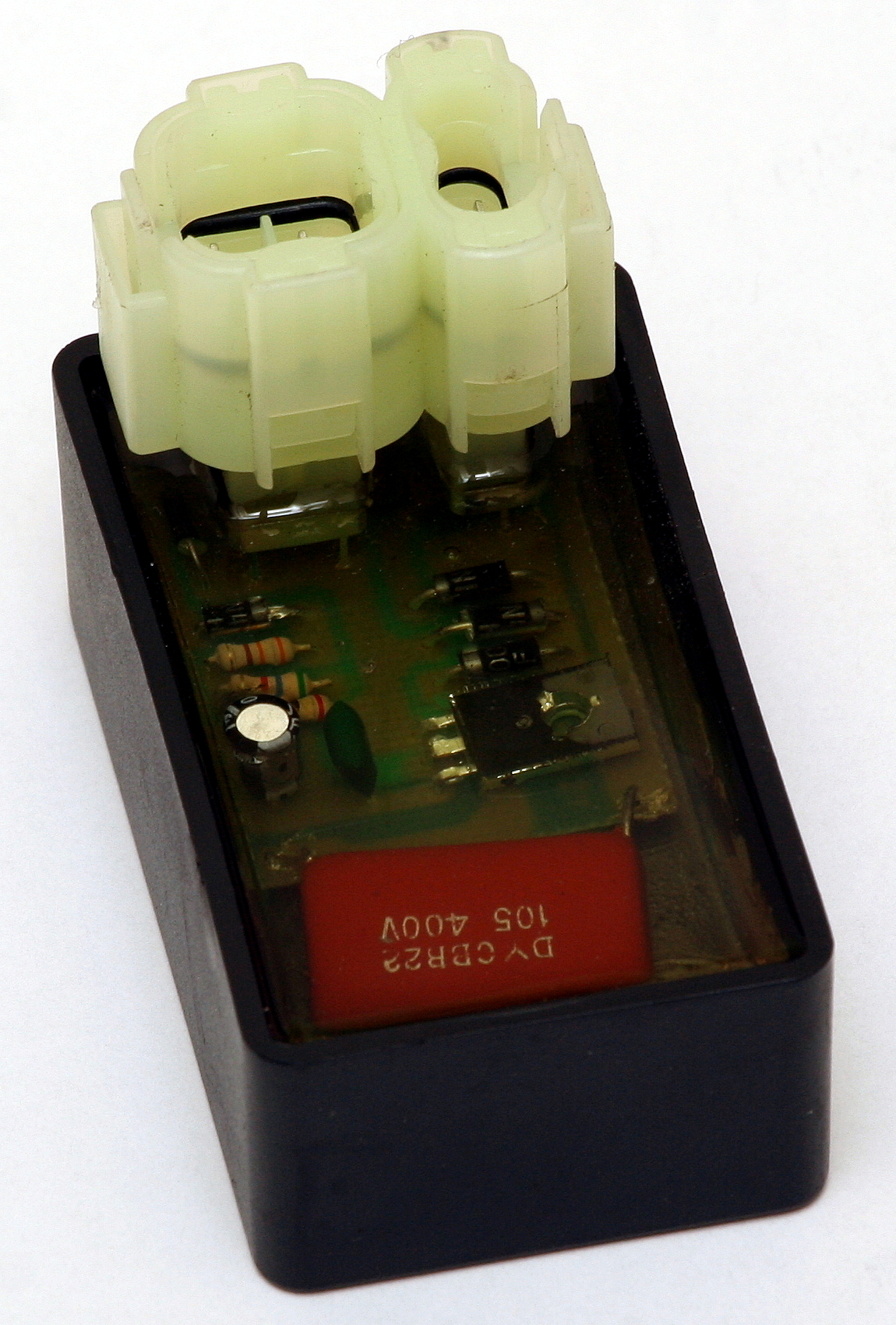
CDI module

Capacitor discharge ignition (CDI) or thyristor ignition is a type of automotive electronic ignition system which is widely used in outboard motors, motorcycles, lawn mowers, chainsaws, small engines, gas turbine-powered aircraft, and some cars. It was originally developed to overcome the long charging times associated with high inductance coils used in inductive discharge ignition (IDI) systems, making the ignition system more suitable for high engine speeds (for small engines, racing engines and rotary engines). The capacitive-discharge ignition uses capacitor to discharge current to the ignition coil to fire the spark plugs.

== History ==
=== Nikola Tesla ===
The history of the capacitor discharge ignition system can be traced back to the 1890s when it is believed that Nikola Tesla was the first to propose such an ignition system. In U.S. patent 609,250 first filed February 17, 1897, Tesla writes 'Any suitable moving portion of the apparatus is caused to mechanically control the charging of a condenser and its discharge through a circuit in inductive relation to a secondary circuit leading to the terminals between which the discharge is to occur, so that at the desired intervals the condenser may be discharged through its circuit and induce in the other circuit a current of high potential which produces the desired discharge.' The patent also describes very generally with a drawing, a mechanical means to accomplish its purpose.

=== Ford Model K ===
Originally invented for Henry Fords six cylinder racer in 1905, the first production use of a CDI system was put into use in 1906 as standard equipment with the Ford Model K. The Model K utilized dual ignition systems, one of which was the Holley-Huff Magneto, or Huff System, manufactured by the Holley Brothers Company. It was designed by Edward S. Huff with US patent #882003 filed July 1, 1905 and assigned to Henry Ford. The system used an engine driven DC generator that charged a capacitor and then discharged the capacitor through the ignition coil primary winding. An excerpt from the 'Motorway' Jan 11 1906, describes its use on Ford six cylinder cars: 'The efficiency of the Ford Magneto is shown by the fact that the instant it is switched in the car will pick up speed and, without changing the position of the ignition control lever, will run at least ten miles an hour faster.'

=== Robert Bosch and the Thyratron ===
It was the Robert Bosch company which was the pioneer of the first electronic CD ignitions. (Bosch is also responsible for the invention of the high-tension magneto.) During World War Two, Bosch had fitted thyratron (tube type) CD ignitions to some piston engined fighter aircraft. With a CD ignition, an aeroplane engine did not need a warm up period for reliable ignition and so a fighter aircraft could take flight more quickly as a result. This early German system used a rotary DC converter along with fragile tube circuitry, and was not suited to life in a fighter aircraft. Failures occurred within only a few hours. The quest for a reliable electronic means of producing a CD ignition began in earnest during the 1950s. In the mid-1950s, the Engineering Research Institute of the University of Michigan in cooperation with Chrysler Corporation in the United States worked to find a method to produce a viable solution.

They were unsuccessful, but did provide much data on the advantages of such a system, should one be built. Namely; a fast voltage rise time to fire fouled or wet spark plugs, high energy throughout the RPM range resulting in better starting, more power and economy, and lower emissions. A few engineers, scientists, and hobbyists had built CD ignitions throughout the 1950s using thyratrons. However, thyratrons were unsuitable for use in automobiles for two reasons. They required a warm-up period which was a nuisance, and were vulnerable to vibration which drastically reduced their service life. In an automotive application, the thyratron CD ignition would fail in weeks or months. The unreliability of those early thyratron CD ignitions made them unsuitable for mass production despite providing short term benefits. One company at least, Tung-Sol (a manufacturer of vacuum tubes) marketed a thyratron CD ignition, model Tung-Sol EI-4 in 1962, but it was expensive. Despite the failings of thyratron CD ignitions, the improved ignition that they gave made them a worthwhile addition for some drivers. For the Wankel powered NSU Spider of 1964, Bosch resurrected its thyratron method for a CD ignition and used this up until at least 1966. It suffered the same reliability problems as the Tung-Sol EI-4.

=== Thyristor ===
It was the SCR, Silicon-controlled rectifier or thyristor invented in the late 1950s that replaced the troublesome thyratron, and paved the way for a reliable solid-state CD ignition. This was thanks to Bill Gutzwiller and his team at General Electric. The SCR was rugged with an indefinite lifetime, but very prone to unwanted trigger impulses which would turn the SCR 'on'. Unwanted trigger impulses in early attempts at using SCRs for CD ignitions were caused by electrical interference, but the main culprit proved to be 'points bounce'. Points bounce is a feature of a points-triggered system. In the standard system with points, distributor, ignition coil, ignition (Kettering system) points bounce prevents the coil from saturating fully as RPM increases resulting in a weak spark, thus limiting high speed potential. In a CD ignition, at least those early attempts, the points bounce created unwanted trigger pulses to the SCR (thyristor) that resulted in a series of weak, untimed sparks that caused extreme misfiring. There were two possible solutions to the problem. The first would be to develop another means of triggering the discharge of the capacitor to one discharge per power stroke by replacing the points with something else. This could be done magnetically or optically, but that would necessitate more electronics and an expensive distributor. The other option was to keep the points, as they were already in use and reliable, and find a way to overcome the 'points bounce' problem. This was accomplished in April 1962 by a Canadian, RCAF officer F.L. Winterburn working in his basement in Ottawa, Ontario. The design used an inexpensive method that would recognize only the first opening of the points and ignore subsequent openings when the points bounced.

=== Hyland Electronics ===
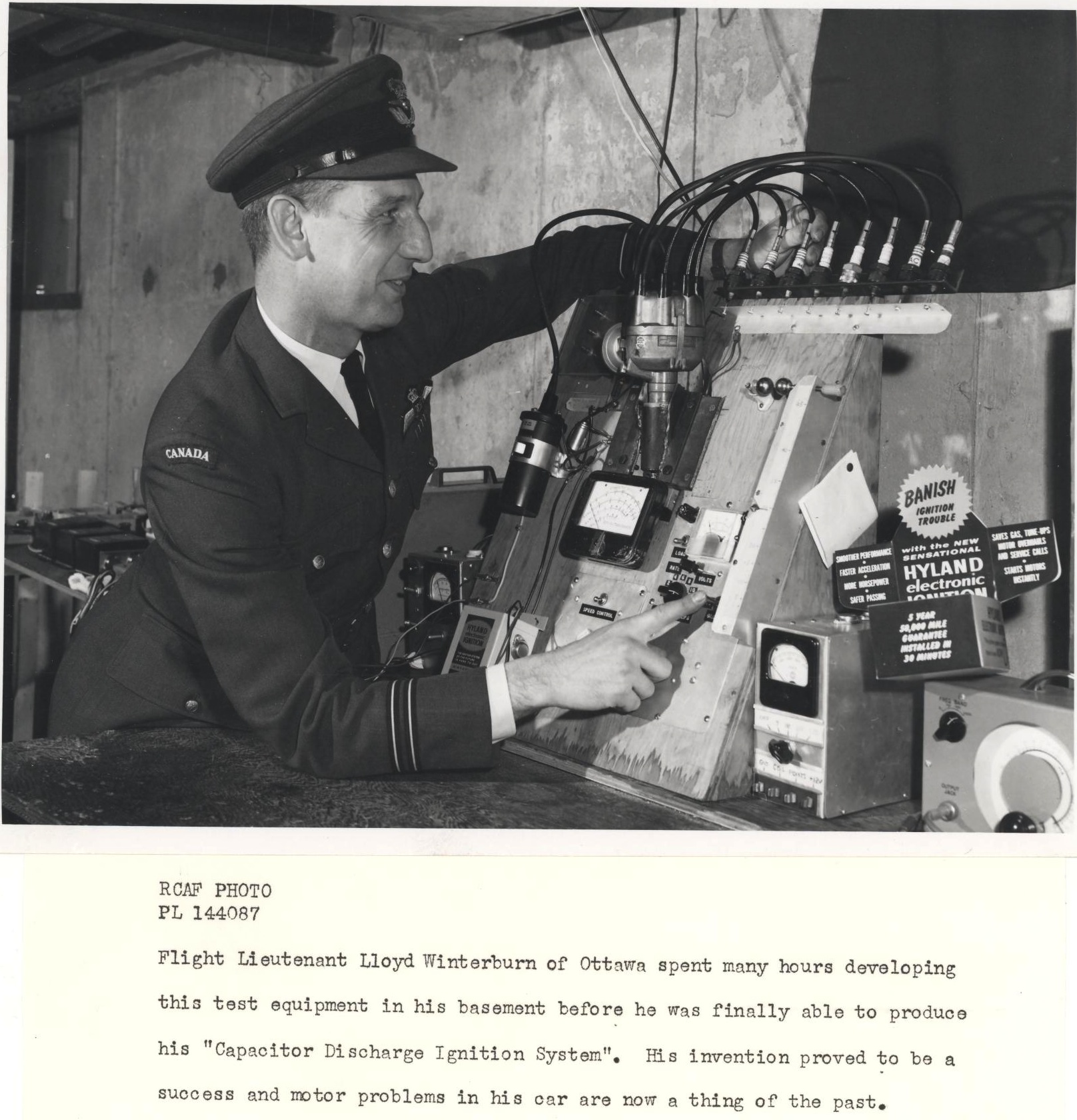
F.L. Winterburn

A company was formed in Ottawa in early 1963 called Hyland Electronics building CD ignitions using the Winterburn design. The discharge capacitor within the CD ignition had the ability to provide a powerful spark in excess of 4 times the spark power of the Kettering system using the same coil, with the exception that spark energy could be maintained at high rpm unlike the Kettering system. The Hyland unit consumed only four amperes at 5000rpm (8cyl) or 10,000rpm(4cyl). Dynamometer testing during 1963 and 1964 showed a minimum of 5% increase in horsepower with the system, with 10% the norm. One example, a Ford Falcon, had an increase in horsepower of 17%. Spark plug lifespan was increased to at least 50,000 miles and points lifespan was greatly extended from 8,000 miles to at least 60,000 miles. Points lifespan became a factor of rubbing block (cam follower) wear and the life cycle of the spring with some lasting almost 100,000 miles.

The Hyland unit was tolerant of varied points gaps. The system could be switched back to standard inductive discharge ignition by the swapping of two wires. The Hyland CD ignition was the first commercially produced solid-state CD ignition and retailed for $39.95 Canadian. The patents were applied for by Winterburn on September 23, 1963 (United States patent# 3,564,581). The design was leaked to the United States in the summer of 1963 when Hyland exposed the design to a US company in an effort to expand sales. Afterward, numerous companies started building their own throughout the 1960s and 1970s without licence. Some were direct copies of the Winterburn circuit. In 1971 Bosch bought the European patent rights (German, French, British) from Winterburn.

=== Wireless World ===
The UK Wireless World magazine of January 1970 published a detailed Capacitor-discharge Ignition system as an electronic hobby build project by R.M. Marston. The circuit of this system was similar to the Winterburn patent in that it used a push-pull converted switch mode oscillator for energy transfer to a store - discharge capacitor and conventional contact breakers to initiate a thyristor triggering discharge of the charged CD capacitor. It was stated to offer several advantages over conventional ignition. Among which: better combustion, easy starting even under subzero conditions, immunity to contactor (points) bounce and 2% - 5% fuel economy. Subsequent letters to Wireless World ( March & May 1970), with Mr. Marston's replies, further discussed aspects of the design and build. In July 1971 Mr. A.P. Harris, undergraduate of the City University London made a detailed electrical engineering analysis of the Marston design as well as automotive engine measurement trials to verify fuel economy. These confirmed the benefits of the CD ignition system. However, he found that the core ingredient of the CD design rested on careful hand winding of the switch mode transformer and appropriate selection of oscillator transistors and choice of oscillator frequency.

=== Current aftermarket systems ===
For various reasons, probably mostly cost, the majority of currently available aftermarket ignition systems appear to be of the inductive discharge type, although in the 1970s and 1980s a variety of capacitive discharge units were readily available, some retaining the points while others provided an alternative type of timing sensor.

== The basic principle ==
Most ignition systems used in cars are inductive discharge ignition (IDI) systems, which are solely relying on the electric inductance at the coil to produce high-voltage electricity to the spark plugs as the magnetic field collapses when the current to the primary coil winding is disconnected (disruptive discharge). In a CDI system, a charging circuit charges a high voltage capacitor, and at the instant of ignition, usually determined by a crank position sensor, the system stops charging the capacitor, allowing the capacitor to discharge its output to the ignition coil before reaching the spark plug.

=== Typical CDI module ===
A typical CDI module consists of a small transformer, a charging circuit, a triggering circuit and a main capacitor. First, the system voltage is raised to 250 to 600 volts by a power supply inside the CDI module. Then, the electric current flows to the charging circuit and charges the capacitor. The rectifier inside the charging circuit prevents capacitor discharge before the moment of ignition. When the triggering circuit receives the triggering signal, the triggering circuit stops the operation of the charging circuit, allowing the capacitor to discharge its output rapidly to the low inductance ignition coil. In a CD ignition, the ignition coil acts as a pulse transformer rather than an energy storage medium as it does in an inductive system. The voltage output to the spark plugs is highly dependent on the design of the CD ignition. Voltages exceeding the insulation capabilities of existing ignition components can lead to early failure of those components. Most CD ignitions are made to give very high output voltages but this is not always beneficial. When there is no triggering signal the charging circuit is re-connected to charge the capacitor.

=== Stored energy ===
The amount of energy the CDI system can store for the generation of a spark is dependent on the voltage and capacitance of the capacitors used, but usually it is around 50 mJ, or more. The standard points/coil/distributor ignition, more properly called the inductive discharge ignition system or Kettering ignition system, produces 25mJ at low speed and drops off quickly as speed increases.

One factor often not taken into consideration when discussing CDI spark energy is the actual energy provided to the spark gap versus the energy applied to the primary side of the coil. As a simple example, a typical ignition coil may have a secondary winding resistance of 4000 ohms and a secondary current of 400 milliamperes. Once a spark has struck, the voltage across the spark gap in a running engine drops to a relatively low value, in the order of 1500-2000 volts. This, combined with the fact that the coil secondary current of 400 milliamperes loses approximately 1600 volts through the 4000 ohm secondary resistance means that fully 50% of the energy is lost in heating the coil secondary. Actual measurements show the real world efficiency to be only 35 to 38% when coil primary winding losses are included.

=== Types ===
Most CDI modules are generally of two types:

AC-CDI

The AC-CDI module obtains its electricity source solely from the alternating current produced by the alternator. The AC-CDI system is the most basic CDI system which is widely used in small engines.

DC-CDI

The DC-CDI module is powered by the battery, and therefore an additional DC/AC inverter circuit is included in the CDI module to raise the 12 V DC to 400-600 V DC, making the CDI module slightly larger. However, vehicles that use DC-CDI systems have more precise ignition timing and the engine can be started more easily when cold.

== Similar Non-CDI Ignition Systems ==
Not all small engine ignition systems are CDI. Some engines like older Briggs and Stratton use magneto ignition. The entire ignition system, coil and points, are under the magnetized flywheel.

Another sort of ignition system commonly used on small off-road motorcycles in the 1960s and 1970s was called Energy Transfer. A coil under the flywheel generated a strong DC current pulse as the flywheel magnet moved over it. (If the engine was rotated while examining the wave-form output of the coil with an oscilloscope, it would appear to be AC. However, since the charge-time of the coil corresponds to much less than a full revolution of the crank, the coil really 'sees' only DC current for charging the external ignition coil.) This DC current flowed through a wire to an ignition coil mounted outside of the engine. The points sometimes were under the flywheel for two-stroke engines, and commonly on the camshaft for four-stroke engines. This system worked like all Kettering (points/coil) ignition systems: the opening points trigger the collapse of the magnetic field in the ignition coil, producing a high voltage pulse which flows through the spark plug wire to the spark plug.

Some electronic ignition systems exist that are not CDI. These systems use a transistor to switch the charging current to the coil off and on at the appropriate times. This eliminates the problem of burned and worn points, and provides a hotter spark because of the faster voltage rise and collapse time in the ignition coil.

== Advantages and disadvantages of CDI ==
A CDI system has a short charging time, a fast voltage rise (between 3 ~ 10 kV/μs) compared to typical inductive systems (300 ~ 500 V/μs) and a short spark duration limited to about 50-600 μs. The fast voltage rise makes CDI systems insensitive to shunt resistance, but the limited spark duration can for some applications be too short to provide reliable ignition. The insensitivity to shunt resistance and the ability to fire multiple sparks can provide improved cold starting ability.

Since the CDI system provides only a reduced duration spark, it's also possible to combine this ignition system with ionization measurement. This is done by connecting a low voltage (about 80 V) to the spark plug, except when fired. The current flow over the spark plug can then be used to calculate the temperature and pressure inside the cylinder.
