= Honda CBX750 =

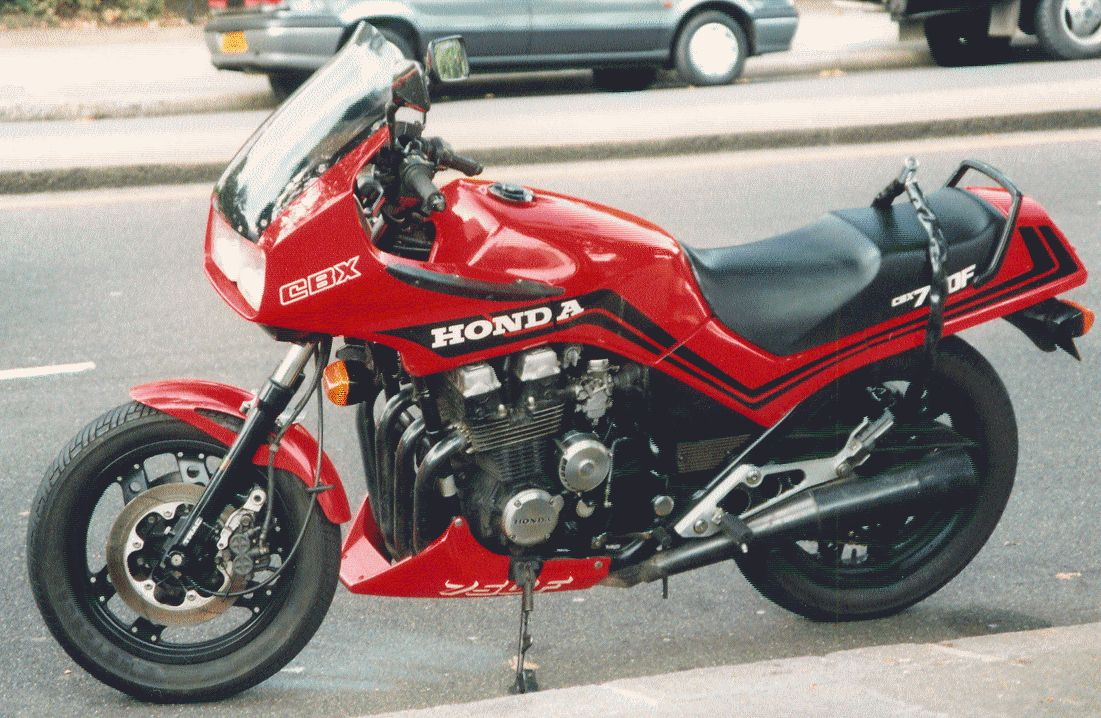
- Manufacturer: Honda
- Also called: CBX750E, CBX750F, CBX750G, CBX750P
- Parent company: Honda
- Production: 1983–88, Police version until 2001
- Successor: CB750F2 (Europe), Nighthawk 750 (Japan and North America)
- Class: Sport bike
- Engine: 747 cc (45.6 cu in) straight-4
- Bore / stroke: 67 mm × 53 mm (2.6 in × 2.1 in)
- Compression ratio: 9.3:1
- Power: 69 kW (93 hp) @ 9,500 rpm (claimed)
- Ignition type: Electric start
- Transmission: 6-speed, chain drive (shaft drive in police version, CBX750 Horizon, and CB700SC Nighthawk Variants)
- Frame type: Steel tubular cradle
- Suspension: Front: 38 mm Standard forks Rear: Pro-Link monoshock (Twin Shock in some CBX750 Horizon and CB700/750SC Nighthawk Models)
- Brakes: Front:281 mm (11.1 in) dual discs 2-piston callipers Rear: single disc 2-piston calliper
- Tires: Front: 110/90R16; Rear: 130/80R18
- Fuel capacity: 22.0 L; 4.84 imp gal (5.81 US gal)
- Related: Honda CBX750P; Honda CB700SC

The CBX750, or RC17 is a Honda motorcycle sold primarily in Europe, South Africa and Australia. Manufactured from 1984 to 1988, the CBX750 was developed from the CB750 while sharing technological data and certain componentry from the VF/VFR Series, which its development ran in parallel; hence the X in CBX being an acronym for City Bike eXperimental. A Japanese market version was offered, known as the CBX750 Horizon, and a modified North American version, the CB750SC Nighthawk S was sold alongside a tariff beating version, the Nighthawk 700S. These US-market tariff-beating models, alongside a version of the Japanese market CBX750 Horizon, had twin shock rear suspension and a shaft-driven final drive.

The pre-1988 CBX750 had a 16-inch-diameter (410 mm) front wheel, which restricts replacement tire choice.

The RC38/39 Nighthawk 750 and RC42 CB750, products of the early 90's retro standard trend, use a substantial amount of CBX750 components within their construction, most notably a retuned version of the 747cc I4 engine and a slightly modified version of the RC17 frame.

== Police version ==
The model became popular within police motor pools in Malaysia, Singapore, Hong Kong, Turkey, Gibraltar and Ireland. This police version, known as the CBX750P, was kept in production until 1994.

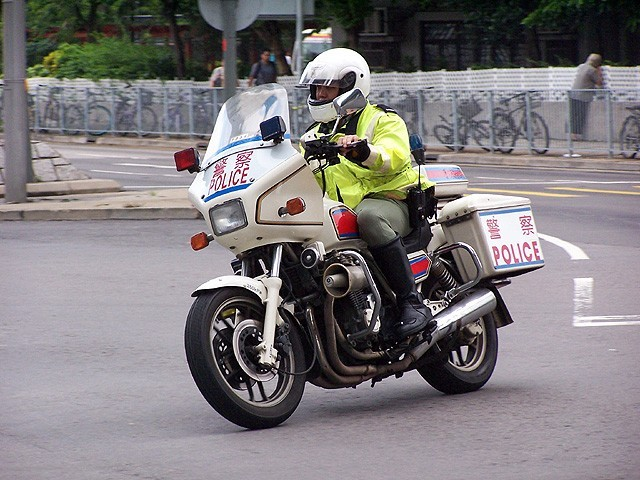
CBX 750 Hong Kong police model

The CBX750P is based on a Japanese CB750SC "Horizon". Which is nearly identical to the sister model CB750SC/CB700SC Nighthawk S, but with an 18-inch front wheel and shaft drive. Unlike the Honda CB700SC, the CBX750P uses a slipper clutch (back-torque limiter) and diaphragm spring to engage clutch.

Similarities between the CBX750P and the CBX750, other than the name, end at them sharing most of the engine parts.

The motorcycle also has four safety guards (two on each side), a meter-stop option (to record top speed), loud speakers, and no fuel gauge.

The Garda Síochána (Irish National Police) Traffic Corps section used the CBX750P in two generations. The only difference being that the second generation had an extendable rear blue flashing light on a pole. The CBX replaced BMW K75's and Kawasaki GT750's from 1984. It is reported that Honda restarted the production line in 1997 to fulfil an order from the Irish Police. In Ireland they began to be replaced from 1998 with the Honda ST1100 (Pan European) with the last being retired in 2002.

At least two were still in use in Gibraltar in 2016.

== F2 ==
Honda CBX 750 F2
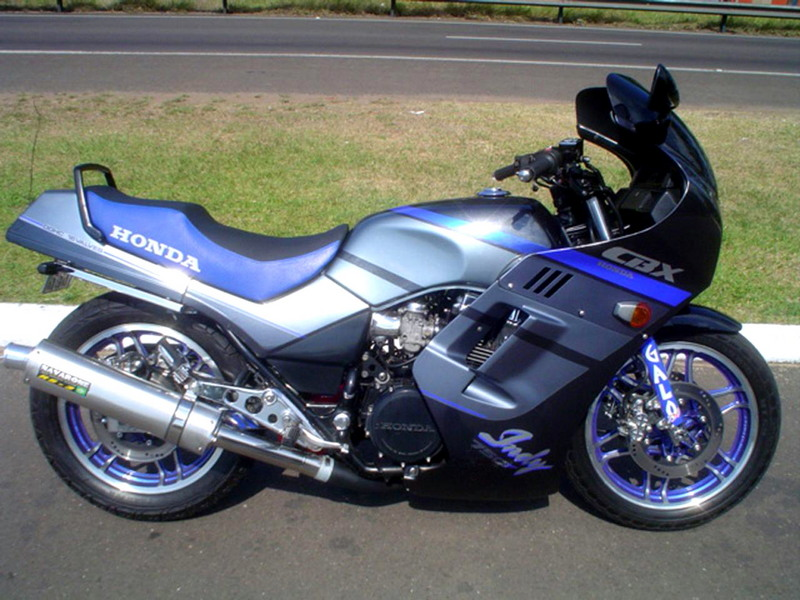
- CBX 750 Indy
- Manufacturer: Honda
- Also called: CBX 750 FII
- Production: 1986–1994
- Predecessor: CBX750F
- Class: Sport touring
- Engine: 747 cc (45.6 cu in) straight-4
- Transmission: 6-speed, chain drive
- Brakes: Front: dual discs 2 piston callipers Rear: single disc
- Tires: Front: 110/90R16; Rear: 130/80R18
- Fuel capacity: 22.0 L; 4.84 imp gal (5.81 US gal)

The CBX 750 F2 (Also CBX 750 FII) is a Honda motorcycle sold primarily in Europe, Brazil and Japan. The CBX 750 F2 was developed from the CBX750, in parallel with the VF750. Until today, many spare parts can be ordered directly from Brazil.
