= SR250 =

SR250 may refer to:

- State Route 250
- Yamaha SR250
