= Honda CB750 and CR750 =

Four cylinder engine motorcycle

CB750
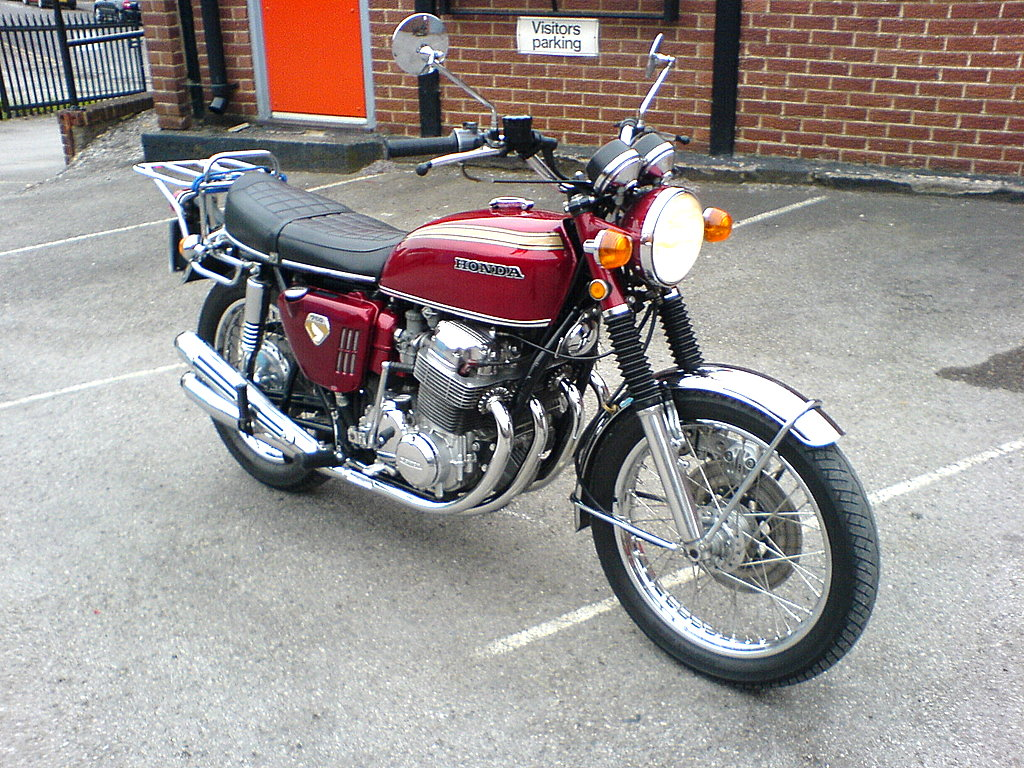
- 1969 CB750
- Manufacturer: Honda
- Also called: Honda Dream CB750 Four
- Production: 1969–2008
- Assembly: Wakō, Saitama, Japan; Hamamatsu, Shizuoka Prefecture, Japan; Suzuka, Mie, Japan
- Predecessor: Honda CB450
- Successor: Honda CBX750
- Class: Sport bike or standard
- Engine: 736 cc (44.9 cu in) SOHC air-cooled straight four (1969–1978); DOHC air-cooled straight 4 (1979–2003, 2007)
- Bore / stroke: 61 mm × 63 mm (2.4 in × 2.5 in)
- Top speed: 125 mph (201 km/h)
- Power: 51 kW (68 hp) @ 8500 rpm (1969) 50 kW (67 hp) @ 8000 rpm (DIN)
- Torque: 44 lbf⋅ft (60 N⋅m) @ 7000 rpm
- Transmission: 5-speed manual, chain final drive
- Suspension: Front: telescopic forks Rear: swingarm with two spring/shock units.
- Brakes: Front disc / Rear drum
- Tires: Front: 3.25" x 19"; Rear: 4.00" x 18"
- Rake, trail: 94 mm (3.7 in)
- Wheelbase: 1,460 mm (57.3 in)
- Dimensions: L: 2,200 mm (85 in); W: 890 mm (35 in); H: 1,100 mm (44 in)
- Seat height: 790 mm (31 in)
- Weight: 218 kg (481 lb) (dry); 233 kg (513 lb) (wet)
- Fuel capacity: 19 L (4.2 imp gal; 5.0 US gal)
- Fuel consumption: 34.3 mpg_{‑US} (6.86 L/100 km; 41.2 mpg_{‑imp})

The CB750 is an air-cooled, transverse, in-line-four-cylinder-engine motorcycles made by Honda over several generations for year models 1969–2008 with an upright, or standard, riding posture. It is often called the original Universal Japanese Motorcycle (UJM) and also is regarded as the first motorcycle to be called a "superbike". The CR750 is the associated works racer.

Though other manufacturers had marketed the transverse, overhead camshaft, inline four-cylinder engine configuration and the layout had been used in racing engines prior to World War II, Honda popularized the configuration with the CB750, and the layout subsequently became the dominant sport bike engine layout.

The CB750 is included in the AMA Motorcycle Hall of Fame Classic Bikes; was named in the Discovery Channel's "Greatest Motorbikes Ever"; was in The Art of the Motorcycle exhibition, and is in the UK National Motor Museum. The Society of Automotive Engineers of Japan, Inc. rates the 1969 CB750 as one of the 240 Landmarks of Japanese Automotive Technology.

Although the CB750 nameplate has carried on throughout multiple generations, the original CB750 line from 1969 to 1983 was succeeded by the CBX750, which used the CB750 designation for several of its derivatives.

== History ==
Honda of Japan introduced the CB750 motorcycle to the US and European markets in 1969 after experiencing success with its smaller motorcycles. In the late 1960s Honda motorcycles were, overall, the world's biggest sellers. There were the C100 Cub step-through—the best-selling motorcycle of all time—the C71, C72, C77 and CA77/8 Dreams; and the CB72/77 Super Hawks/Sports. A taste of what was ahead came with the introduction of the revolutionary CB450 DOHC twin-cylinder machine in 1966. Profits from these production bikes financed the successful racing machines of the 1960s, and lessons learned from racing were applied to the CB750. The CB750 was targeted directly at the US market after Honda officials, including founder Soichiro Honda, repeatedly met US dealers and understood the opportunity for a larger bike.

=== Early racing ===
In 1967 American Honda's service manager Bob Hansen flew to Japan and discussed with Soichiro Honda the possibility of using Grand Prix technology in bikes prepared for American motorcycle events. American racing's governing body, the AMA, had rules that allowed racing by production machines only, and restricted overhead-valve engines to 500 cc whilst allowing the side-valve Harley Davidsons to compete with 750 cc engines. Honda knew that what won on the race track today, sold in the show rooms tomorrow, and a large engine capacity road machine would have to be built to compete with the Harley Davidson and Triumph twin-cylinder machines.

Hansen told Soichiro Honda that he should build a 'King of Motorcycles', and the CB750 appeared at the Tokyo Show in November 1968. In the UK, it was publicly launched at the Brighton motorcycle show, held at the Metropole Hotel exhibition centre during April 1969, with an earlier press-launch at Honda's London headquarters; the pre-production versions appeared with a high and very wide handlebar intended for the US market.

The AMA Competition Committee recognised the need for more variation of racing motorcycle and changed the rules from 1970, by standardizing a full 750 cc displacement for all engines regardless of valve location or number of cylinders, enabling Triumph and BSA to field their 750 cc triples instead of the 500 cc Triumph Daytona twins.

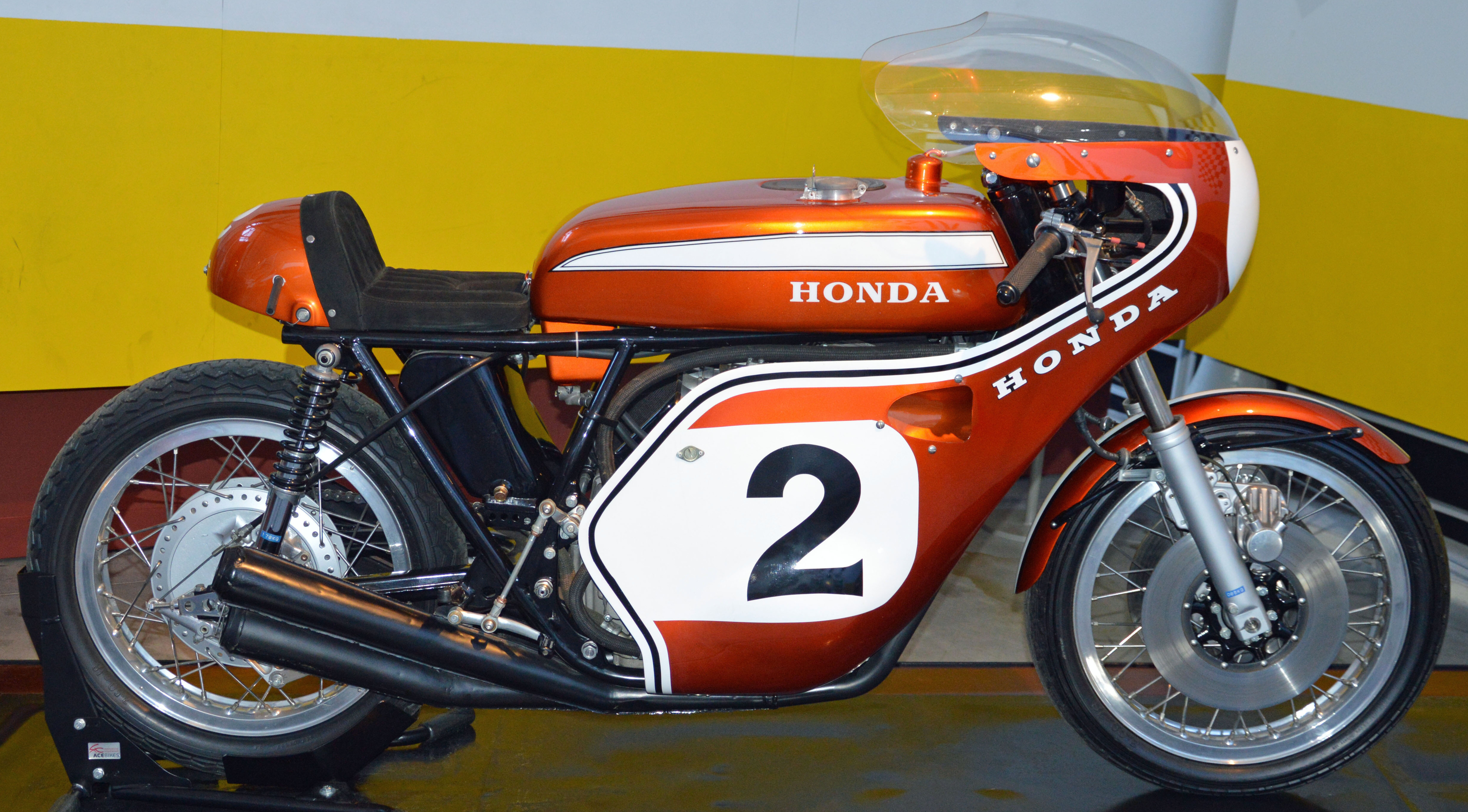
Dick Mann's Daytona-winning CR750 on display at Le Musée Auto Moto Vélo, a transportation Museum in Châtellerault, France

The Honda factory responded by producing four works-racer CR750s, a racing version of the production CB750, ridden by UK-based Ralph Bryans, Tommy Robb and Bill Smith under the supervision of Mr Nakamura, and a fourth machine under Hansen ridden by Dick Mann. The three Japanese-prepared machines all failed during the race with Mann just holding on to win by a few seconds with a failing engine.

Hansen's race team's historic victory at the March 1970 Daytona 200 with Dick Mann riding a tall-geared CR750 to victory preceded the June 1970 Isle of Man TT races when two 'official' Honda CB750s were entered, again ridden by Irishman Tommy Robb partnered in the team by experienced English racer John Cooper. The machines were entered into the 750 cc Production Class, a category for road-based machines allowing a limited number of strictly-controlled modifications. They finished in eighth and ninth places. Cooper was interviewed in UK monthly magazine Motorcycle Mechanics, stating both riders were unhappy with their poor-handling Hondas, and that he would not ride in the next year's race "unless the bikes have been greatly improved".

In 1973, Japanese rider Morio Sumiya finished in sixth place in the Daytona 200-Mile race on a factory 750.

== Production and reception ==
Under development for a year, the CB750 had a transverse straight-four engine with a single overhead camshaft (SOHC) and a front disc brake, neither of which had previously been available on an affordable mainstream production motorcycle. This spec, married with the introductory price of US$1,495 (US$13,125 in current money), gave the CB750 a considerable sporting-performance advantage over its competition, particularly its British rivals.

Cycle magazine called the CB750, "the most sophisticated production bike ever" at the time of the bike's introduction. Cycle World called it a masterpiece, highlighting Honda's painstaking durability testing, the bike's 124 mph (200 km/h) top speed, the fade-free braking, the comfortable ride, and the excellent instrumentation.

The CB750 was the first modern four-cylinder machine from a mainstream manufacturer, and the term superbike was coined to describe it. Adding to the bike's value were its electric starter, kill switch, dual mirrors, flashing turn signals, easily maintained valves, and overall smoothness and low vibration both under way and at a standstill. Much later models from 1991 included maintenance-free hydraulic valves.

Unsure of the bike's reception and therefore unable to accurately gauge demand for the new bike, Honda limited its initial investment in the production dies for the CB750's engine by using a technique called permanent mould casting (often erroneously referred to as sandcasting), rather than diecasting. After the initial run of 7,414 motorcycles Honda switched to die casting, with the initial run of bikes going on to be prized by collectors. The bike remained in the Honda line up for ten years, with a production total over 400,000.

== Models ==
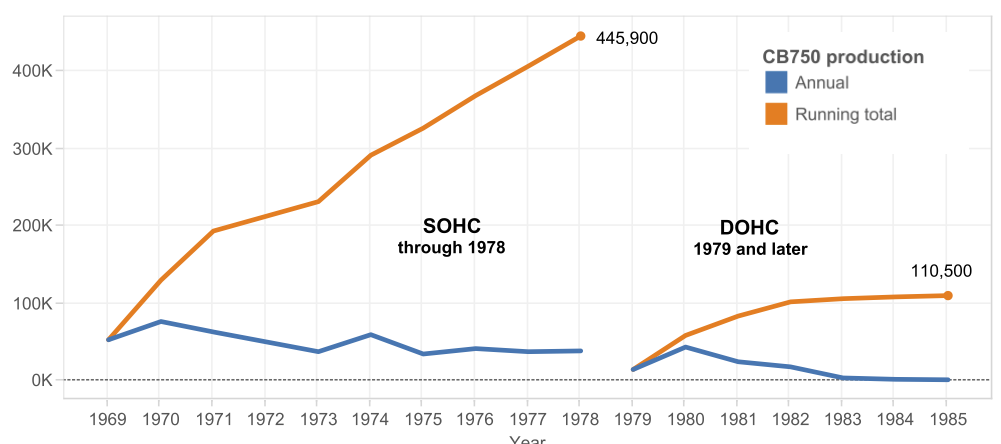
Annual and cumulative production statistics, separated by SOHC (to 1978) and DOHC (1979 and later)

Note: All CB750 engines are air/oil-cooled, as opposed to liquid-cooled

=== SOHC ===
Year and model code:

- 1969 CB750 (6 June), CB750K or CB750K0 (date unknown)
- 1970 CB750K1 (21 September)
- 1972 CB750K2 (US 1 March)
- 1973 CB750K3 (US-only 1 February. K2 elsewhere)
- 1974 CB750K4 (US/Japan-only, K2 elsewhere)
- 1975 CB750K5 (US-only, K2/K4 elsewhere), CB750FO, CB750A (Canada-only) The 1975 CB750F had a more streamlined look, thanks in part to a 4-into-1 exhaust and cafe style seat with fiberglass rear. Other changes included the use of a rear disc brake and a lighter crankshaft and flywheel.
- 1976 CB750K6, CB750F1, CB750A
- 1977 CB750K7, CB750F2, CB750A1
- 1978 CB750K8 (US-only), CB750F3, CB750A2

Model	Production (rounded figures)
CB750K0	53,400
CB750K1	77,000
CB750K2	63,500
CB750K3	38,000
CB750K4	60,000
CB750K5	35,000
CB750K6	42,000
CB750K7	38,000
CB750K8	39,000
CB750F	15,000
CB750F1	44,000
CB750F2	25,000
CB750F3	18,400
CB750A	4,100
CB750A1	2,300
CB750A2	1,700

=== DOHC ===
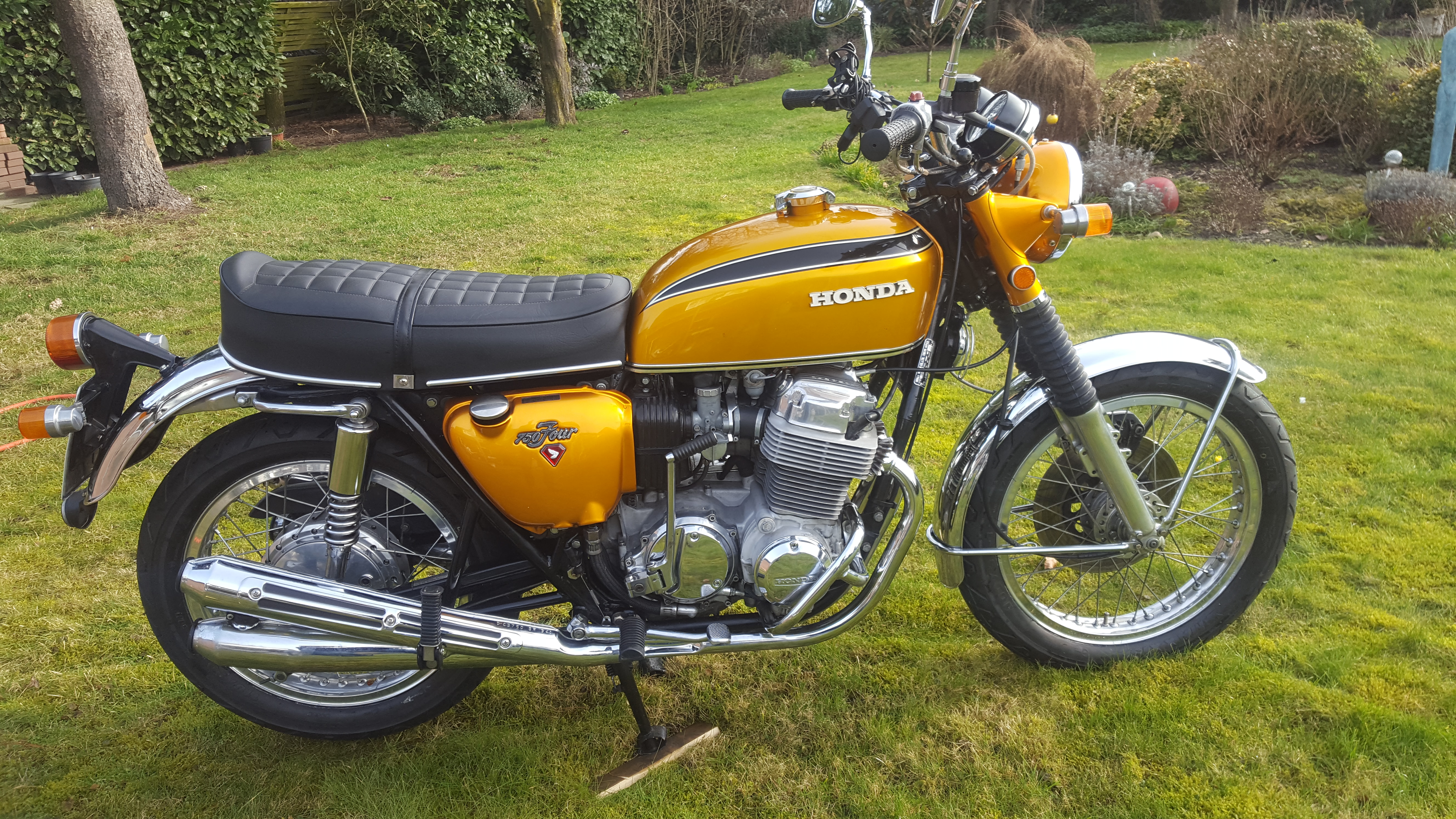
Honda CB750 Four

- 1979–1982 CB750K
- 1979 CB750K 10th Anniversary Edition (5,000 produced for US)
- 1979–1982 CB750F
- 1980–1983 CB750C "Custom"
- 1982–1983 CB750SC Nighthawk
- 1984–1986 CB750SC Nighthawk S (Horizon in Japan. Export version of the CBX750.)
- 1991–2003 Nighthawk 750
- 1992–2008 CB750 (sold as CB750F2 and CB Seven-Fifty in Europe)
- 2023–present CB750 Hornet (Derived from the 2023 Transalp)

=== CB750A Hondamatic ===
CB750A
- Also called: Hondamatic
- Production: 1976–1978
- Engine: 736.6 cc (44.95 cu in) inline-four, SOHC air-cooled
- Bore / stroke: 61.0 mm × 63.0 mm (2.40 in × 2.48 in)
- Compression ratio: 7.7:1
- Top speed: 156 km/h (97 mph)
- Power: 47 PS (35 kW; 46 hp) @ 7500 rpm
- Torque: 5.0 kg⋅m (49 N⋅m; 36 lb⋅ft) @ 6000 rpm
- Ignition type: Coil
- Transmission: 2-speed automatic, w/torque converter, chain
- Brakes: Front: 296 mm (11.7 in) disc Rear: 180 mm (7.1 in) drum
- Tires: Front: 3.5" x 19"; Rear: 4.5" x 17"
- Rake, trail: 28°, 110 mm (4.5 in)
- Wheelbase: 1,470 mm (58.0 in)
- Dimensions: L: 2,260 mm (89.0 in); W: 800 mm (31.5 in)
- Seat height: 840 mm (33.0 in)
- Weight: 262 kg (578 lb) (claimed) (dry); 259 kg (572 lb) (wet)
- Fuel capacity: 18 L (4.0 imp gal; 4.8 US gal)

In 1976, Honda introduced the CB750A to the United States, with the A suffix designating "Automatic", for its automatic transmission. Although the two-speed transmission includes a torque converter typical of an automatic transmission, the transmission does not automatically change gears for the rider. Each gear is selected by a foot-controlled hydraulic valve/selector (similar in operation to a manual transmission motorcycle). The foot selector controls the application of high pressure oil to a single clutch pack (one clutch for each gear), causing the selected clutch (and gear) to engage. The selected gear remains selected until changed by the rider, or the kickstand is lowered (which shifts the transmission to neutral).

The CB750A was sold in the North American and Japanese markets only. For Japan, it was sold from April 1977 but it was discontinued there before the 1978 models (A2) were introduced. In Japan it was sold as the Honda EARA, with that name being a combination of "Era" with "A" for automatic, while also signifying "Expands Automatic Riding Age". The name Hondamatic was shared with Honda cars of the 1970s, but the motorcycle transmission was not fully automatic. The design of the transmission is similar in concept to the transmission in Honda's N360AT, a kei car sold in Japan from 1967 to 1972.

The CB750A uses the same engine as the CB750, but detuned with lower 7.7:1 compression and smaller (PW24 rather than PW28) carburettors producing a lower output, 47 PS (35 kW; 46 hp). The same oil is used for the engine and transmission, and the engine was changed to a wet sump instead of dry sump type. A lockout safety device prevents the transmission from moving out of neutral if the side stand is down. There is no tachometer but the instruments include a fuel gauge and gear indicator. For 1977 the gearing was revised, and the exhaust changed to a four-into-two with a silencer on either side. Due to slow sales the model was discontinued in 1978, though Honda did later introduce smaller Hondamatic motorcycles (namely the CB400A, CM400A, and CM450A). Cycle World tested the 1976 CB750A's top speed at 156 km/h (97 mph), with a 0–60 mph (97 km/h) time of 10.0 seconds and a standing 1/4 mile (400 m) time of 15.90 seconds at 138.95 km/h (86.34 mph). Honda's official figures (from the Japanese market) were a top speed of 165 km/h (103 mph) and a 0-400-metre (1,310 ft) time of 14.90 seconds. Braking from 60 to 0 mph (97 to 0 km/h) was 39 m (129 ft).

=== Nighthawk 750 & CBX750 derived CB750 Models ===
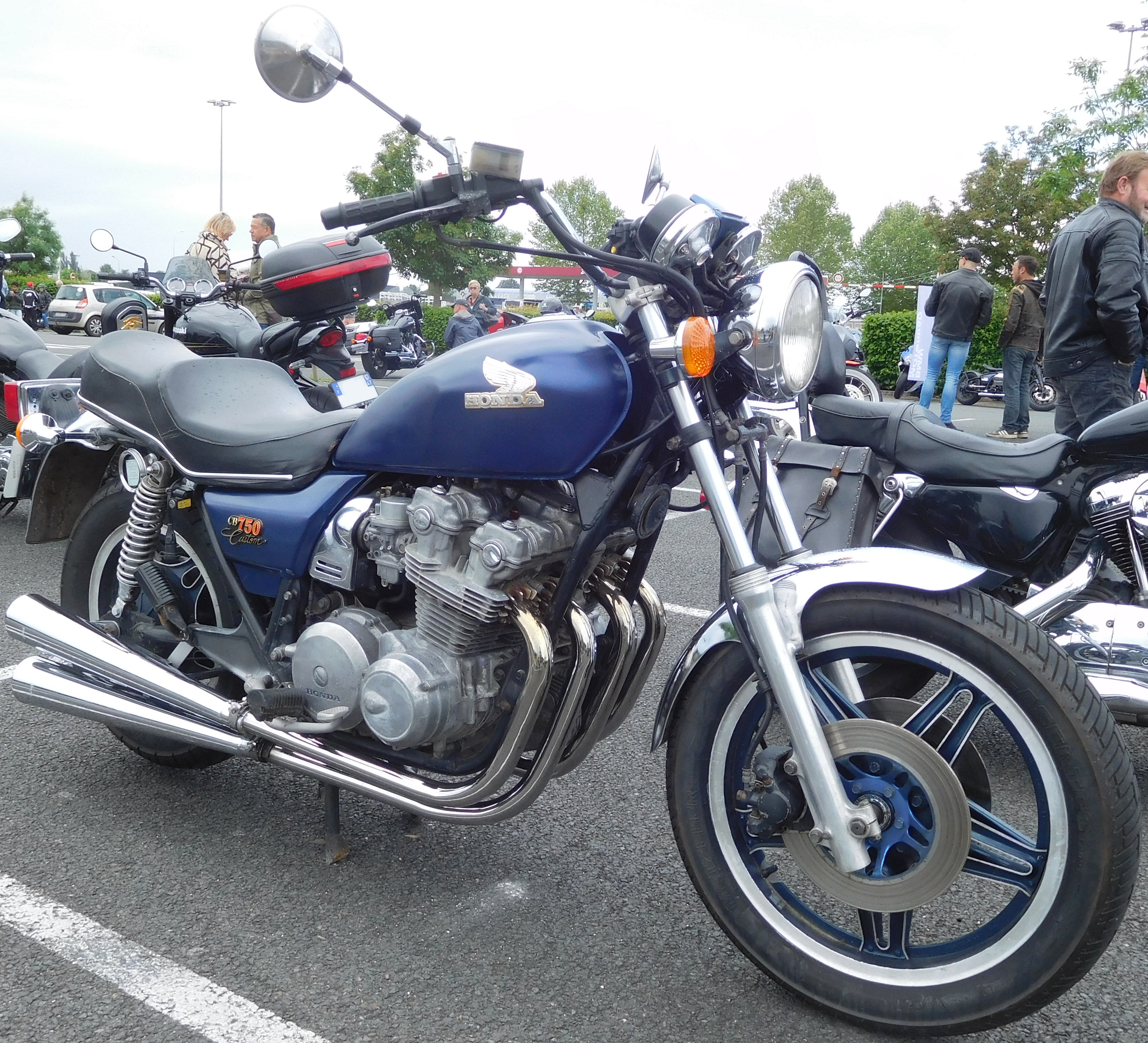
The 1980-1983 CB750C "Custom" would become the basis for the Honda Nighthawk line of motorcycles.

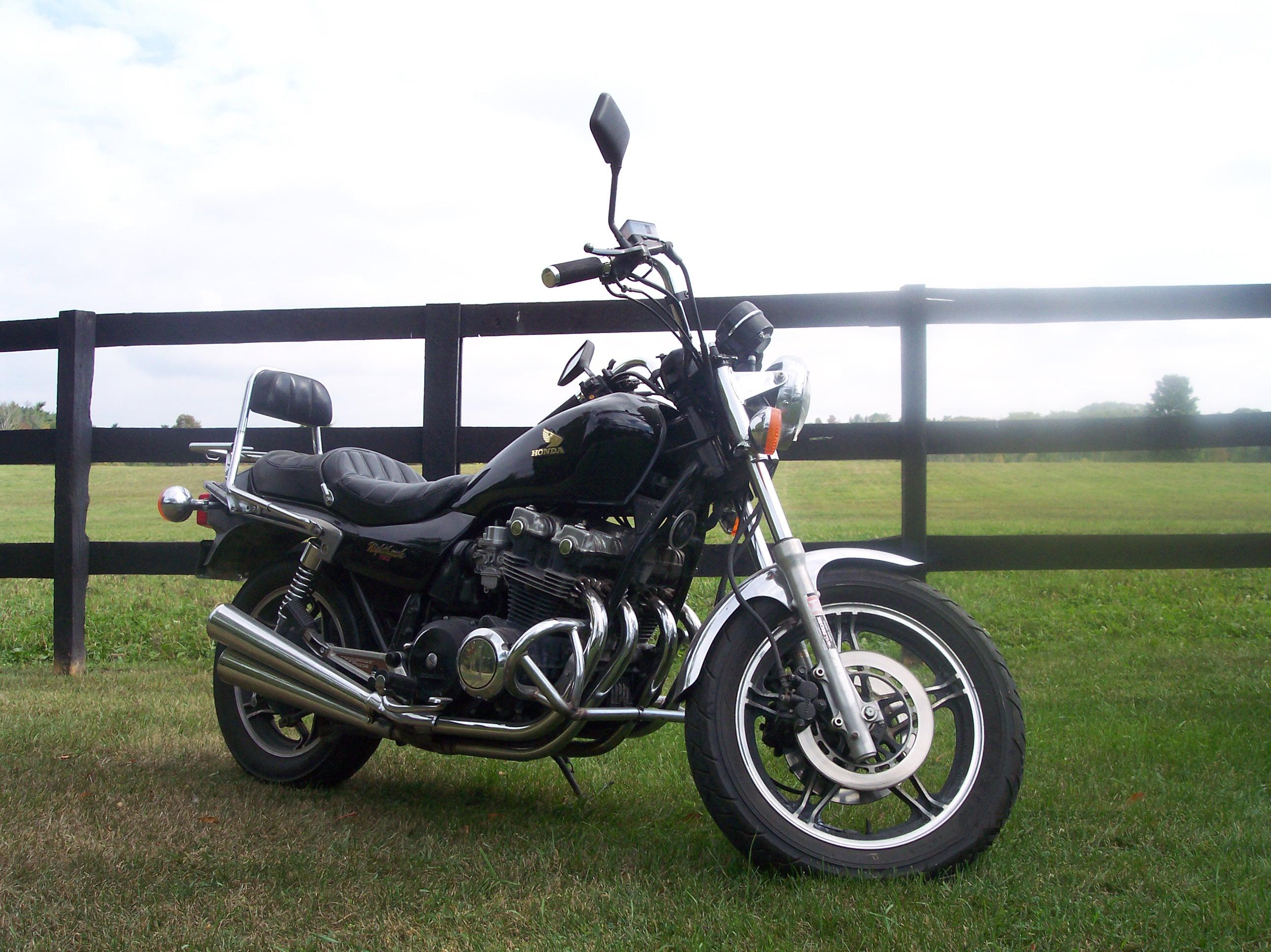
1982 Honda Nighthawk 750SC

From 1982 through 2003, with the exception of several years, Honda produced a CB750 known as the Nighthawk 750. As the motorcycle market in the early 1980s began to experience segmentation and the prevalence of UJMs began to dwindle, Honda made efforts to hold its territory on the market by offering more specific variants of their existing bikes as the company was still in the midst of researching and developing dedicated sportbike and cruiser lines. The cruiser variant of many of the Honda models offered at the time would be known as "customs"; this included but was not limited to the CB900C, CX500C, CM250C and the CB750C, and these bikes would prove to be the most popular with American consumers. Therefore, expanding upon the niche that the CB750C "Custom" had initiated along with its "custom" stable mates, a new series of bikes appeared with the surname "Nighthawk". These bikes would continue to take on the 'pseudo' cruiser bike aesthetic that was specifically catered for the North American market at the time along with offering certain upmarket features, one notable feature being hydraulic valves. Along with the normal CB750 1982-1983 variants the CB750SC Nighthawk would be offered. The Nighthawk 750SC had a 749cc 4-stroke engine with a 5-speed manual transmission, chain drive, front disc and rear drum brakes. Also exclusive to the Nighthawk variant was Honda's TRAC (Torque Reactive Anti-Dive System). Because of the 1983 motorcycle tariff, the Nighthawk CB750SC was soon replaced by the smaller, yet more sporty and sophisticated CB700SC Nighthawk S. This new motorcycle was a downsized version of the CB750SC Nighthawk S, the export variant of the CB750's successor, the CBX750

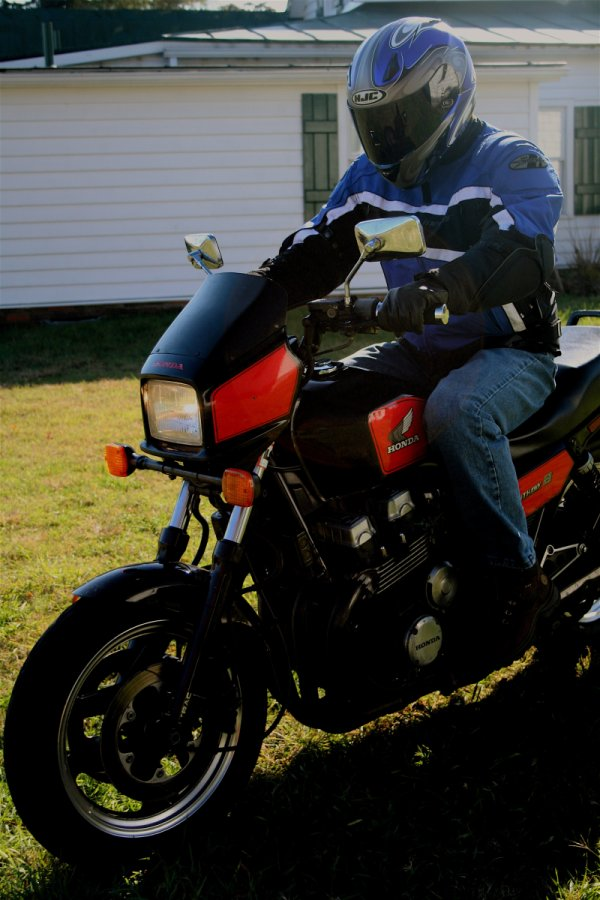
1984-1986 Honda CB700SC Nighthawk S, a lower displacement version of the CB750SC Nighthawk S made to satisfy legal requirements set forth by the 1983 tariff.

After the discontinuation of the CB700SC Nighthawk S in 1986 and the tariff being lifted in 1987 Honda decided not to follow up with the larger CB750SC Nighthawk S, which was offered for the Canadian market. Instead, as was typically the case for many Japanese corporations during the bubble years, Honda began to experiment with its standard bike offerings by first releasing the V-twin NT650 in 1988 and later both the café racer GB500 and CBR400RR derived CB-1 in 1989. Though innovative in their own right, these motorcycles had very short lives in the North American Market; soon growing demand emerged for a return towards the traditional UJM style that had fallen out of prominence due to market segmentation. Also in 1989, Kawasaki had successfully released the Zephyr 400 in the Japanese market and soon 550cc and 750cc versions would debut for export markets as well, which was an indicator that a return to form was needed in order to meet demand both at home and abroad.

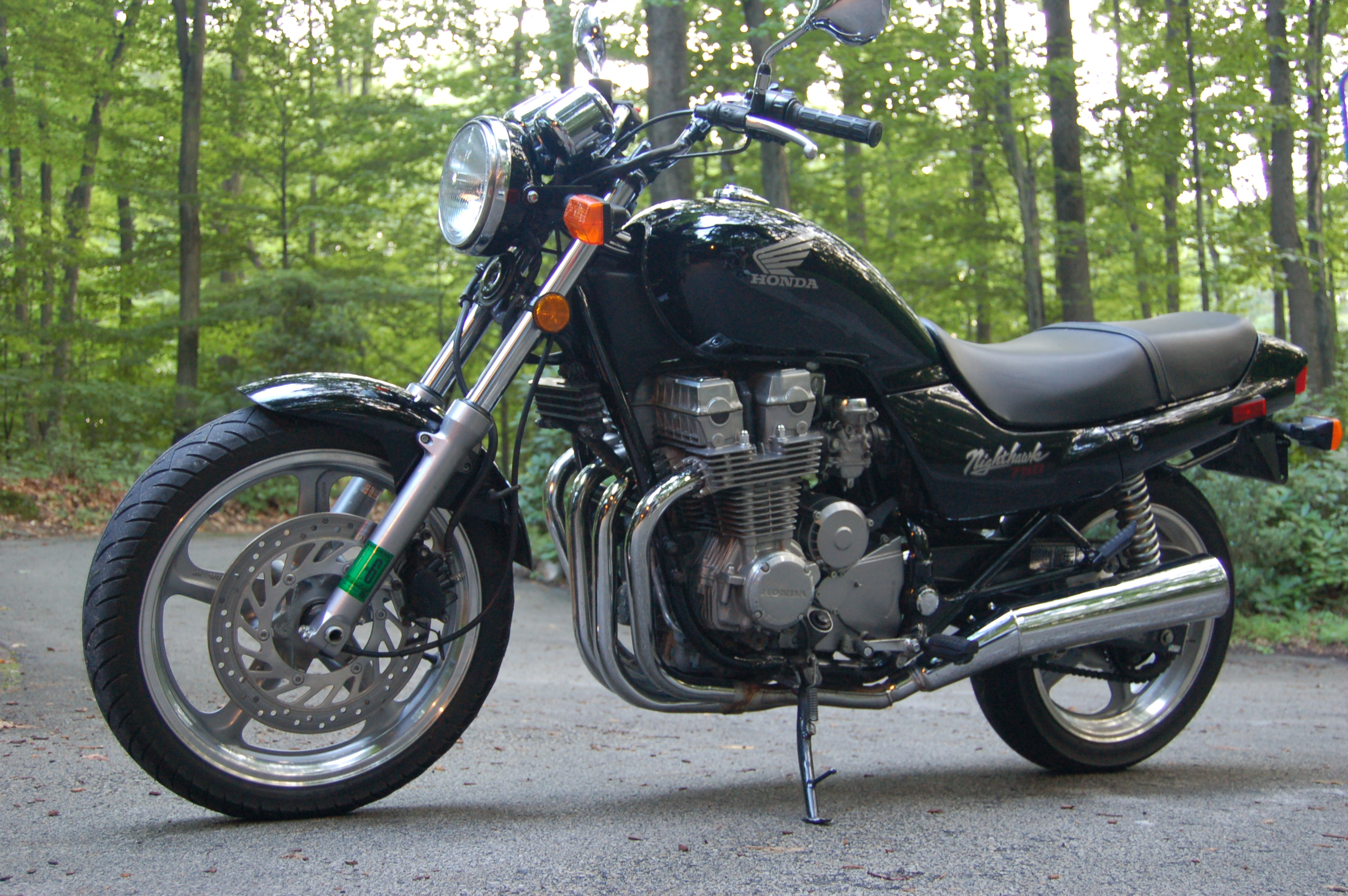
1992 Honda Nighthawk 750

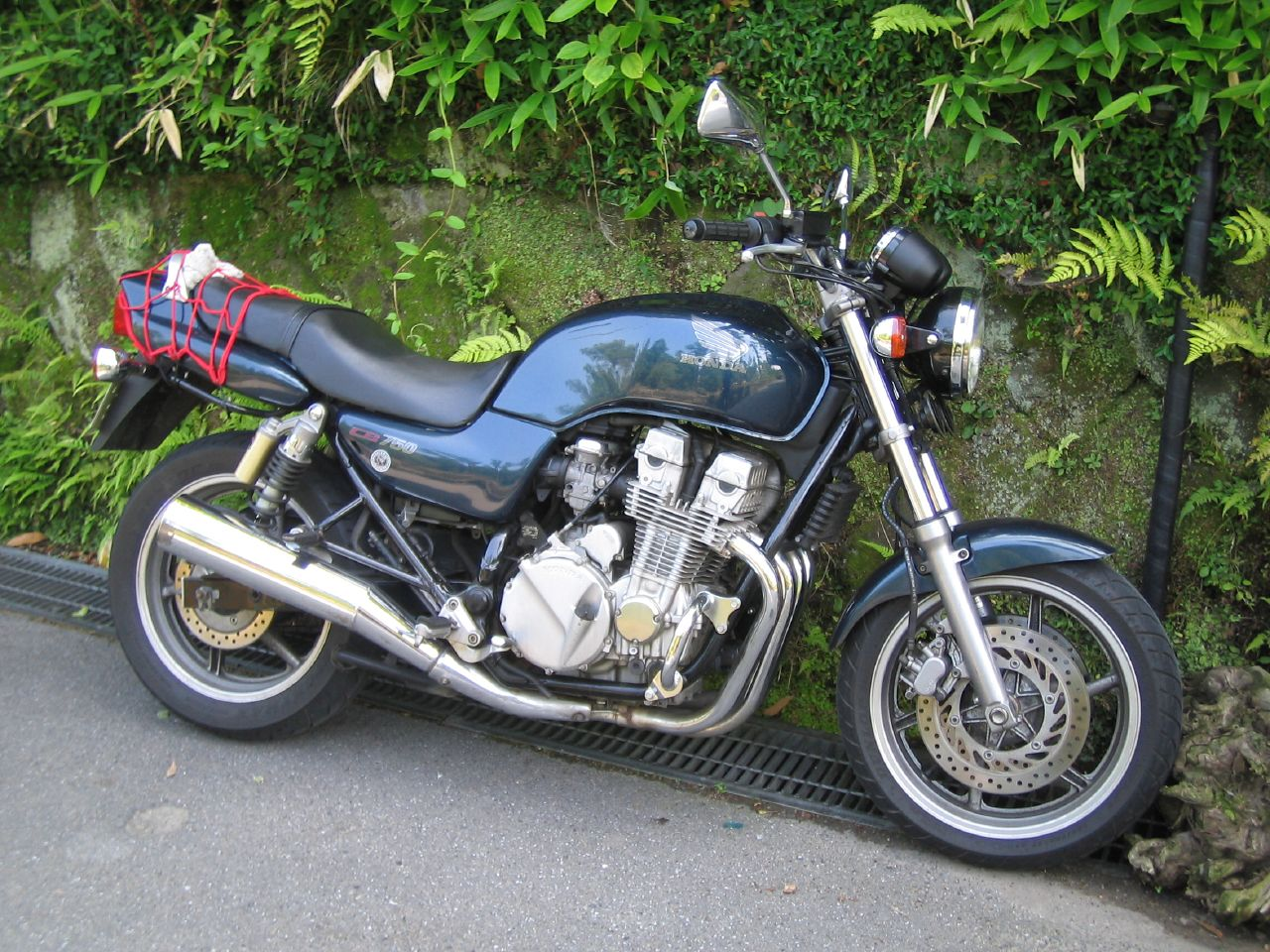
2001 Honda CB750

Honda responded in the summer of 1991 with the RC38 Nighthawk 750, which was marketed in both North America and Japan. The Japanese model was released only as a limited single year run (750 units) and possessed its own designation, RC39 CB750 Nighthawk. In the following year, the higher spec RC42 CB750 would debut for European and Japanese markets (in Europe it went by either CB750F2 or CB Seven-Fifty) coinciding with the release of the NC31 CB400 and SC30 CB1000. Both the RC38/39 and RC42 were parts-bin specials, mainly being mechanical descendants of the CBX750 yet also borrowing numerous components from other bikes such as the CBR600F2, Goldwing and CB-1.

The RC38/39 Nighthawk 750 differed from the RC42 CB750 by taking on a more budget-friendly, cruiser-adjacent approach with its packaging; instead of the CB750's dual front disc and single rear disc brake setup, the Nighthawk 750 instead made use with a single disc brake on a larger front 18" wheel and a rear drum brake. The fork rake angle on the Nighthawk 750 was slightly increased and conventional twin hydraulic shock absorbers were used instead of the CB750's gas-charged absorbers; The foot pegs were welded to the frame, rather than being interchangeable like on the CB750 and the styling for the Nighthawk was given a more 'retro', smoother reworking that was reminiscent of the Nighthawk bikes of the early 1980s. The engine, exhaust, transmission, gearing and gauges were the same on both bikes, though the Nighthawk used a smaller capacity oil cooler.

In AMC's The Walking Dead, two custom RC38 Nighthawk 750s were used as screen bikes to be ridden by Norman Reedus' character, Daryl Dixon.

The RC42 CB750 was widely adopted at riding schools throughout Japan to prepare riders for their large motorcycle license exams due in part to its smooth power delivery, predictable handling, neutral ergonomics, reliability and maintainability.

The entry-level 1992-2008 Nighthawk 250 replicated the Nighthawk 750's styling along with using the Nighthawk nomenclature.

==== 2007 CB750 Special Edition ====
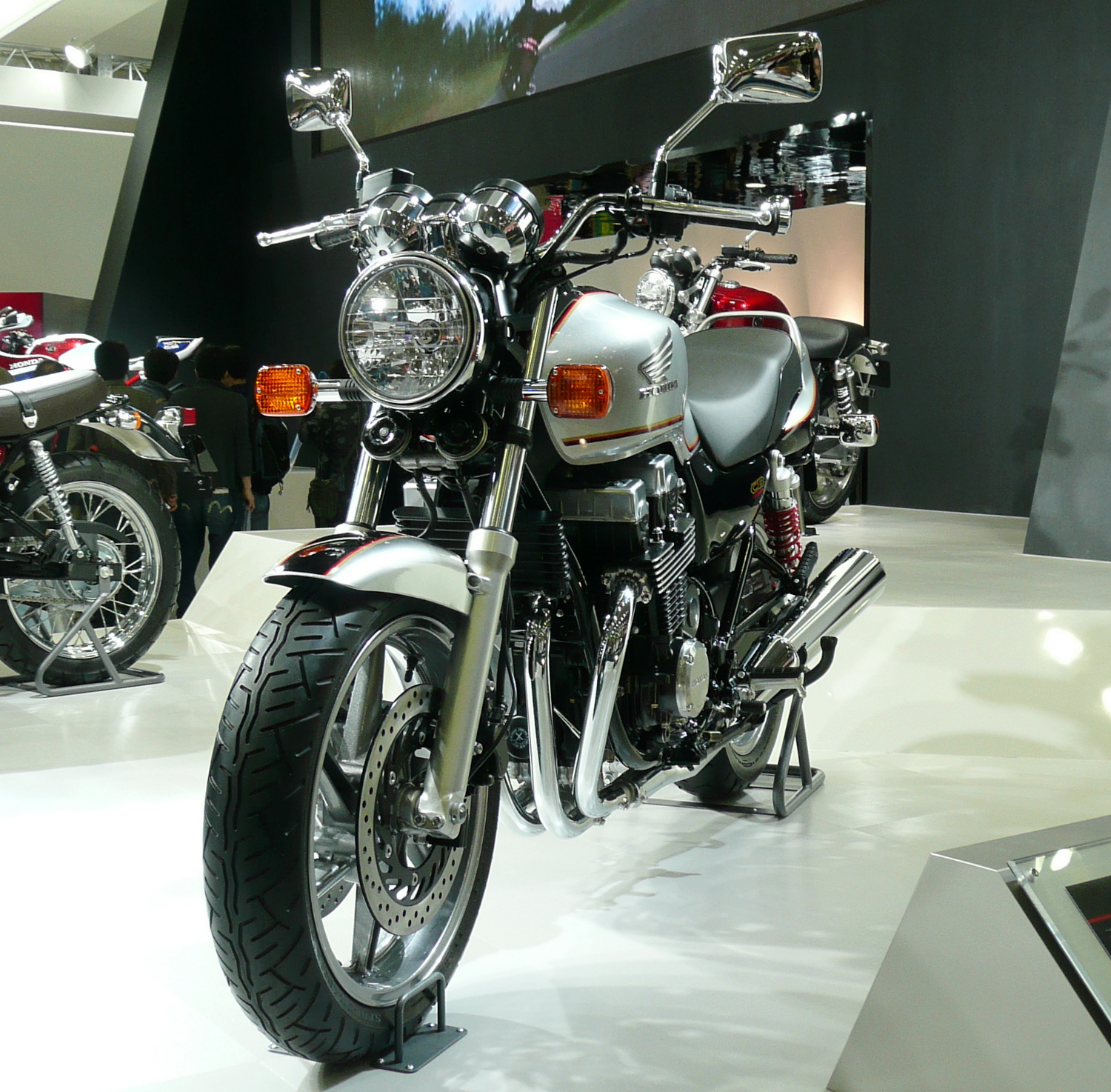
2007 Honda CB750 Special Edition

In 2007 Honda Japan offered a Special Edition version of the RC42 CB750. This limited edition run was put forth to commemorate the 25th anniversary of "Fast Freddie" Spencer joining the Honda Grand Prix Team. These bikes would don the "Digital Silver Metallic" color of the CB750 racebike Spencer used in the 1981 AMA Superbike championship alongside a version that was painted in "Candy Blazing Red" reminiscent of the CBX1000.

=== Discontinuation and Successors ===
The CB750F2/CB Seven-Fifty was discontinued for the European market in 2001 and in 2003 the Nighthawk 750 was discontinued in North America, though the CB750 would continue in Japan until 2008 when 2007 automobile exhaust gas regulations went into effect. This would lead the CBR600F3 based Honda Hornet CB600F and later both the CB650F and NC700 series to eventually take over the role as Honda's middleweight standard bike offerings in both Europe and North America.

In 2010, Honda released the CB1100, which although well over 750cc in displacement and fuel-injected was marketed as a spiritual successor to the original 1970-1983 CB750 models in terms of style and concept. It started selling in North America and Europe from 2013, to 2017 and 2022 respectively.

==== 2023 CB750 Hornet ====
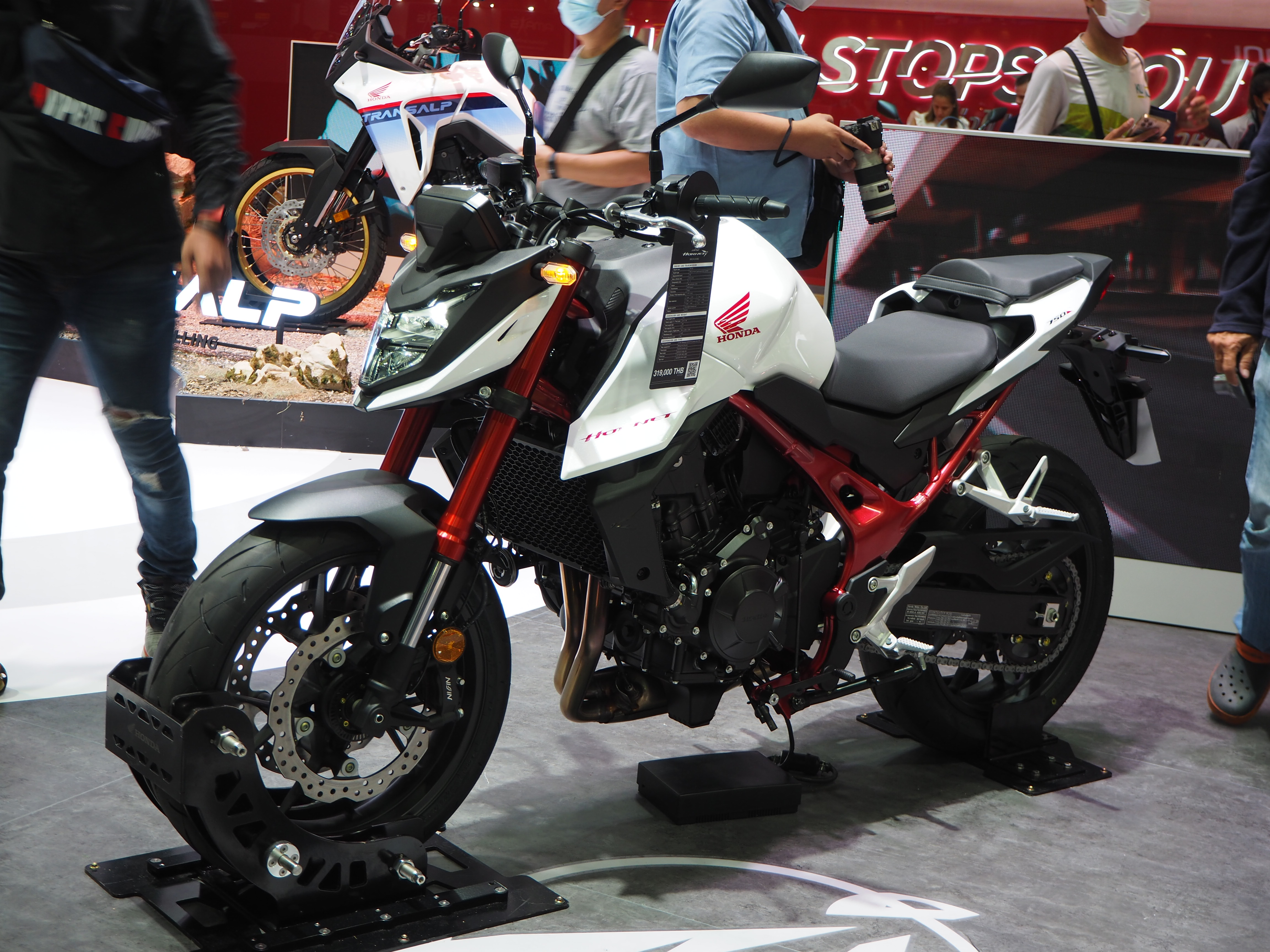
2023 CB750 Hornet

In 2023, Honda Motor Europe Ltd revived the CB750 nameplate once more in the form of the CB750 Hornet. This new model is not a successor to the CB750 motorcycles, but part of the updated Hornet line of naked sportbikes. The frame and engine of the motorcycle are lifted directly from new XL750 Transalp; the new engine being a 755cc SOHC 8-valve liquid-cooled PGM-FI equipped parallel twin with an output of 90.5 hp @ 9,500 rpm and 55.3 lb.-ft. @ 7,250 rpm. The CB750 Hornet is sold in European, Australia, India, Japan and Southeast Asian markets. It replaces the CB650R in the United States and was launched along with the CB1000 Hornet SP.

== Specifications ==
Model	Engine displacement	Fuel system	Cam	Valves per cylinder	Power	Torque	Weight	Drive
1969–1978 CB750 Four	736 cc (44.9 cu in)	4 carburettors	SOHC	2	67 bhp (50 kW) @ 8000 rpm	59.8 N⋅m (44.1 lbf⋅ft) @ 7000 rpm	218 kg (481 lb) (dry)	5-Speed, Constant Mesh, Gearbox, Final Drive Chain
1976–1978 CB750A	736 cc (44.9 cu in)	4 carburettors	SOHC	2	47 PS (35 kW; 46 hp) @ 7500 rpm		262 kg (578 lb) (claimed dry); 259 kg (572 lb) (wet)	2-speed w/torque converter, chain
1978 CB750K	748 cc (45.6 cu in)	4 carburettors	DOHC	4	58 kW (78 hp) @ 9000 rpm		231 kg (509 lb) (dry)	5-Speed, Constant Mesh, Gearbox, Final Drive Chain
1979–1980 CB750F (RC04)	748 cc (45.6 cu in)	4 carburettors	DOHC	4	58 kW (78 hp) @ 9000 rpm	42.6 lb⋅ft (57.8 N⋅m) @ 8000 rpm	228 kg (503 lb) Dry	5-Speed, Constant Mesh, Gearbox, Final Drive Chain
1980–1982 CB750C Custom	748 cc (45.6 cu in)	4 carburettors	DOHC	4	58 kW (78 hp) @ 9000 rpm	42.6 lb⋅ft (57.8 N⋅m) @ 8000 rpm	236 kg (520 lb) dry ~252 kg (556 lb) wet	5-Speed, Constant Mesh, Gearbox, Final Drive Chain
1981 CB750F	748 cc (45.6 cu in)	4 carburettors	DOHC	4	50 kW (67 hp)	42.6 lb⋅ft (57.8 N⋅m) @ 8000 rpm	243 kg (536 lb)	Chain
1982–1983 CB750SC (Nighthawk)	749 cc (45.7 cu in)	4 carburettors	DOHC	4	49.64 kW (66.57 hp) @ 9000 rpm	41.54 lbf⋅ft (56.32 N⋅m) @ 7500 rpm	260.1 kg (573.5 lb) wet	5-Speed, Chain See also Honda CB700SC
1991-2003 (Nighthawk 750)	747 cc (45.6 cu in)	4 Keihin 34 mm Constant Vacuum carburettors	DOHC	4	56 kW (75 hp) @ 8500 rpm	64 N⋅m (47 lbf⋅ft) @ 7500 rpm	210 kg (463 lb)	Chain
1992-2008 CB750 (1992-2001 CB750F2)	747 cc (45.6 cu in)	4 Keihin 34 mm Constant Vacuum carburetors (1992–2003) Keihin VENA Carbs (2004–2008)	DOHC	4	55 kW (74 hp) @ 8500 rpm	64 N⋅m (47 lbf⋅ft) @ 7500 rpm	240 kg (520 lb)	Chain
2023-CB750 Hornet	755cc (46 cu in)	PGM-FI	SOHC	4	67.5 kW (90 hp) @ 9500 rpm	75 Nm (55.3 lb-ft) @ 7250 rpm	190 kg (419 lb) (wet)	Chain

== See also ==
- Triumph Bonneville T140 (Role model)
