= Universal Japanese Motorcycle =

'70s motorcycles that revolutionized the US bike market

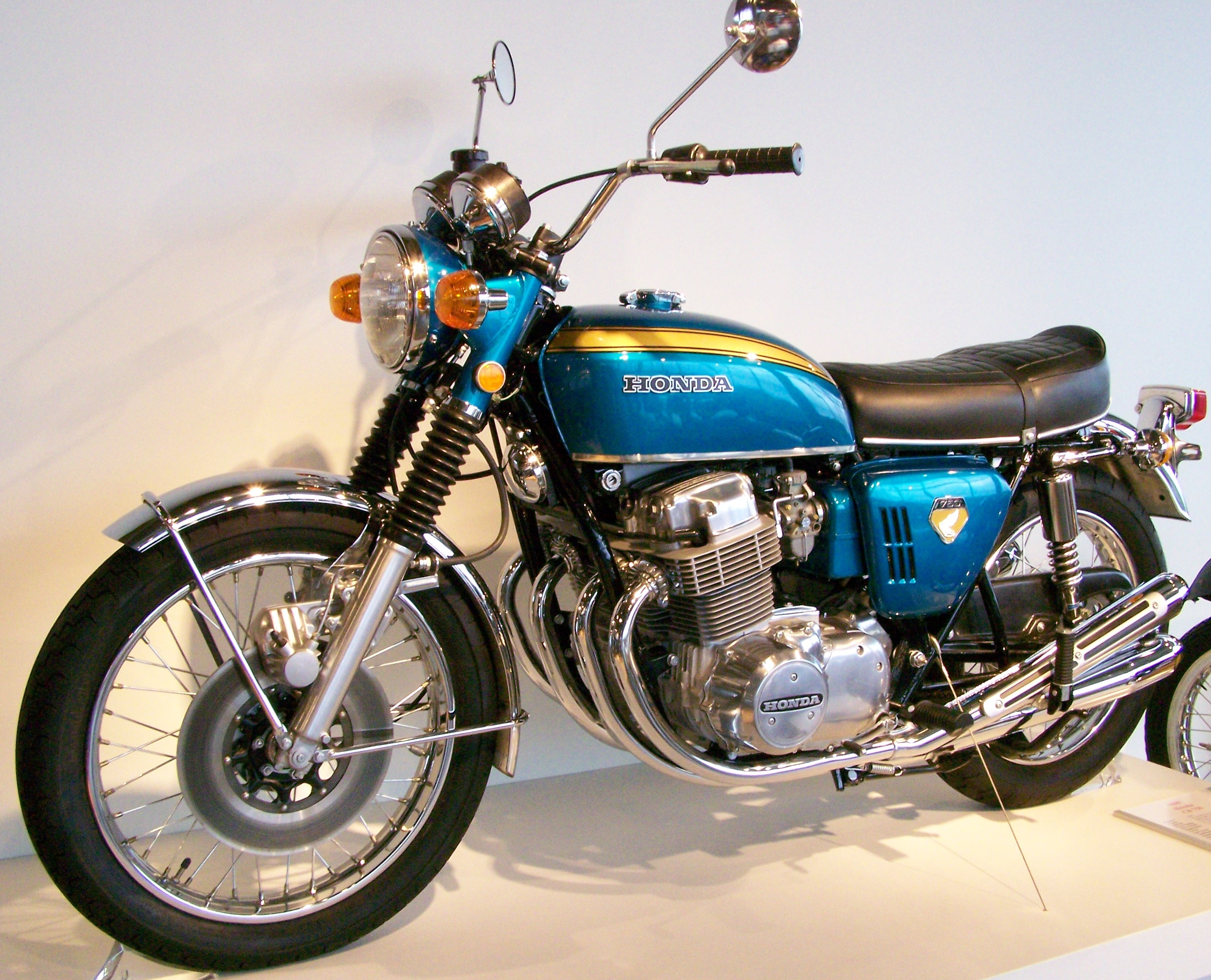
The Honda CB750, a classic UJM

The basic platform was an upright, open seating position motorcycle powered by a carbureted, air-cooled engine wrapped in a steel-tube cradle-type frame, and at least one disc brake to bring it all to a stop. The simple design made motorcycling accessible to riders of all types and skill sets. UJMs were available in various displacements, and their ubiquity helped grow motorcycling in America during the 1970s and ‘80s.

— Source: Motorcycle.com

The term "Universal Japanese Motorcycle", or UJM, was coined in the mid-1970s by Cycle Magazine to describe a proliferation of similar Japanese standard motorcycles that became commonplace following Honda's 1969 introduction of its successful CB750. The CB750 became a rough template for subsequent designs from all three of the other major Japanese motorcycle manufacturers. In 2011, The New York Times said lightning struck for Honda "with the 1969 CB 750, whose use of an inline 4-cylinder engine came to define the Universal Japanese Motorcycle."

The UJM template featured a four-cylinder engine, standard riding position, carburetor for each cylinder, unit construction engine, front disc brake, conventional tubular cradle frame and telescopic front forks and twin-shock rear suspension. As the major Japanese motorcycle manufacturers, Honda, Kawasaki, Suzuki, and Yamaha, began replicating each other's designs, the UJM's created a homogeneity of form, function and quality. UJMs included such prominent models as the Honda CB500, the Kawasaki Z1, and the Suzuki GS750. Such machines had massive sales, and UJMs continued to be produced for more than a decade.

In 1976, Cycle described the new phenomenon, saying:

"In the hard world of commerce, achievers get imitated and the imitators get imitated. There is developing, after all, a kind of Universal Japanese Motorcycle.... conceived in sameness, executed with precision, and produced by the thousands."

In the 2010 book, Sport Bikes, Hans Hetrick wrote that:

"throughout the 1970s, the Japanese companies experimented with different types of engines and frame designs. Their ideas soon came together in a rock-solid package. This design became known as the Universal Japanese Motorcycle, or UJM."

Subsequently, in the 1980s and 1990s, the Japanese manufacturers diversified their ranges, producing faired sportsbikes, race-replicas, dual-sport bikes and musclebikes.

== History ==
A defining example of the type, the Honda CB750, was introduced in 1969 with an engine based on technology Honda had developed in Grand Prix racing. Compared to the British and American models that then dominated the market, it had better performance and reliability, was better equipped, and yet was much cheaper. It revolutionized the industry both in America and abroad, and sales in America immediately overtook those of big bikes from established brands like BSA and Triumph.

The CB750's first Japanese competitor was the Kawasaki Z1 in 1972. It was followed in 1976 by the Suzuki GS750 and by the Yamaha XS Eleven in 1978. These manufacturers all produced smaller versions of the same UJM formula, including, for example, the Honda CB500 of 1971. By 1979 Harley-Davidson's big bike sales were down 90%.

The term UJM appeared as early as 1976 in a Cycle magazine review of the Kawasaki Z650. The term "universal" arose from the fact that during the 1970s, the Japanese "big four" (Honda, Kawasaki, Suzuki, and Yamaha) all produced very similar designs.

The UJM was a general-purpose road bike, and the style went into decline in the early to mid 1980s with the segmentation of the market and the development of niche products, such as sport, dual-sport, touring, sport touring, café racers, and cruisers. Honda sold about 400,000 CB750s, and the model run ended in 2003 with the Nighthawk.

There have been several market revivals led by increased demand for simplified standard general purpose, or naked bikes and has led Japanese manufacturers to introduce modern interpretations of the UJM; first in the early 1990s with the Honda CB750 RC42 and CB1000, Suzuki GS1100G and VX800, the Kawasaki Zephyr Series, and Yamaha continuing to sell its SR Series. Recently, revival efforts have included the Honda CB1100, Honda SCL500, Suzuki TU250X, Suzuki GD110, the Kawasaki W800 and the Yamaha SR400.

== Specification ==
The UJM had an advanced design and an excellent specification compared to contemporary European and American competition. The press described it as cheap, reliable, easy to ride, manufactured with precision, and with a reputation for excellence.

Technical specifications typically included a standard riding position, front disc brake, conventional tubular frame and telescopic front forks and twin-shock rear suspension. The engine was an inline four cylinder air cooled four-stroke transverse engine, with a carburetor for each cylinder, and single, or double, overhead camshafts. The unit construction engine was mated to a five or six speed manual transmission, and had an electric starter.
