= Honda Nighthawk =

Series of U.S.-market motorcycles

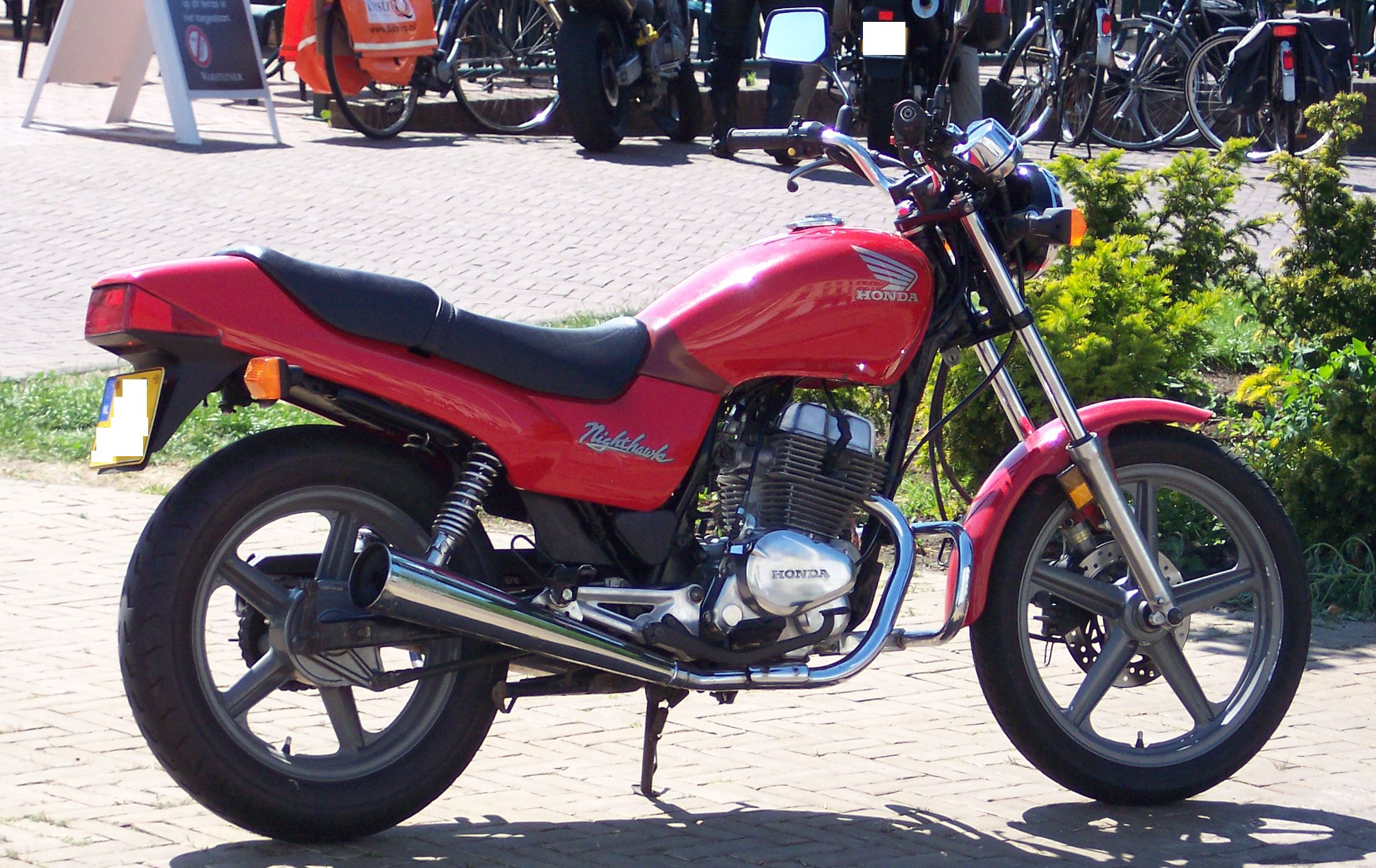
Red Honda CB250 Nighthawk motorcycle parked outside

The Honda Nighthawk is the US model designation for some of Honda's CB series of motorcycles.

This class includes:

- CB250
- CB450SC
- CB550SC
- CB650SC
- CB700SC
- CB750
- CB750SC
