= Honda CB700SC =

Honda CB700SC Nighthawk S
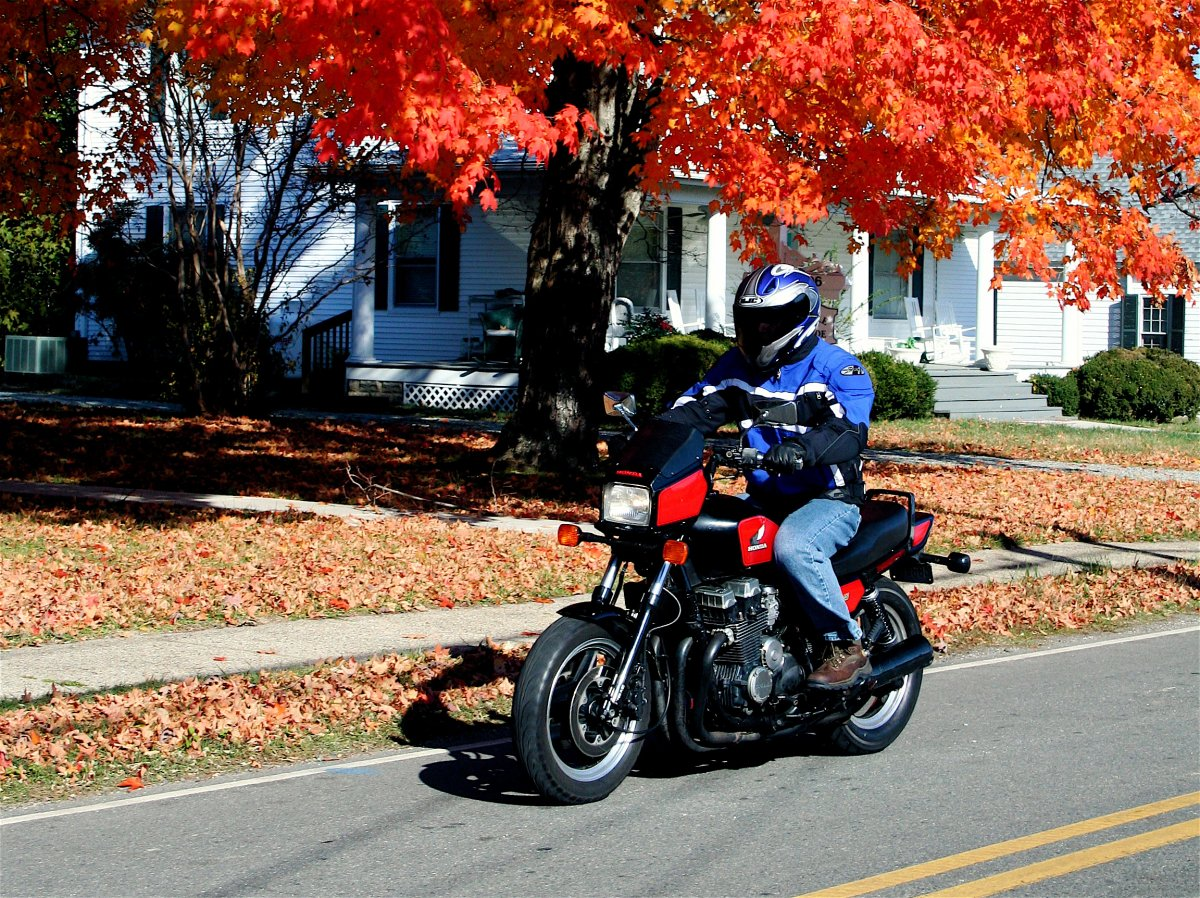
- Manufacturer: Honda
- Production: 1984–1986
- Predecessor: Honda CB750
- Successor: Nighthawk 750 (RC38)
- Class: Standard
- Engine: 696 cc (42.5 cu in), four-stroke, air/oil-cooled, inline four
- Compression ratio: 9.3:1
- Top speed: 190 km/h (120 mph) (est)
- Power: 60 kW (80 hp) at 9,500 RPM (claimed)
- Torque: 61 N⋅m (45.2 lb⋅ft) at 8,000 RPM
- Ignition type: Electric start
- Transmission: 6-speed shaft drive manual
- Frame type: Tubular steel full cradle
- Suspension: Front: 39 mm air adjustable with TRAC anti-dive Rear: dual shocks
- Brakes: Front: dual-disc with twin-piston caliper Rear: drum
- Wheelbase: 59.1 in (1,500 mm)
- Dimensions: L: 84.8 in (2,150 mm); W: 30.7 in (780 mm)
- Seat height: 31.1 in (790 mm)
- Weight: 469.7 lb (213.1 kg) (dry); 516 lb (234 kg) (wet)
- Fuel capacity: 4.2 US gal (16 L; 3.5 imp gal) (0.7 US gal (2.6 L; 0.58 imp gal) reserve)
- Oil capacity: 3.0 US quarts
- Fuel consumption: 42 mpg (US)
- Related: Honda CB750; Honda CB650SC; Honda CBX750P

The CB700SC Nighthawk 700S is a carbureted, air-cooled, in-line four-cylinder motorcycle marketed by Honda solely in the United States for model years 1984–1986, with a standard or neutral, upright riding position.

As a downsized variant of the CB750SC Nighthawk S, itself an export version of the CBX750, the CB700SC was meant to circumvent the tariff laws of 1983-1987. Notable features included a 6-speed transmission, hydraulic valve lifters, shaft drive, front bikini fairing, gear indicator and 16" alloy wheels — at an introductory list price of $3,398.

== Design and features ==
The four-cylinder engine featured double overhead cams, with hydraulic lifters which eliminated valve adjustments. The exhaust was a four-into-two finished in black chrome. The engine layout was the same as the 650 Nighthawk's, but of a different design sharing no parts. The bike also had shaft drive, electronic ignition, a digital gear indicator, an automatic cam chain adjuster, a spin-on automobile-style oil filter, and Honda's second-generation TRAC (Torque Reactive Anti-dive Control) front end control system. Tire size on both front and rear wheels was 16 inches. Brakes were double disc in front, drum in rear.

The Japan-only shaft-drive variant was very close if not identical to the Canadian variant and was also marketed in a police-type configuration which was marketed in other Asian countries.

The Nighthawk 700S bodywork (1984–1985) was mostly black with either red or blue panels. In 1986, paint was navy blue with white decals and red pinstripes — or black with red decals and tri-color pinstripes. Valve cover and clutch covers were painted black as well as the wheels. The engine was black with polished edges on the cylinder head fins. Other components were also black including the lower fork legs, handlebars, and rear grab rails.

== Tariff avoidance ==
The actual engine size of the CB700SC was 696cc, which by design was below the 700cc limit of a steep tariff imposed in 1983 by the United States International Trade Commission. In Europe and Canada, Honda marketed the CB750SC, a virtually identical bike with a slightly larger engine capacity.

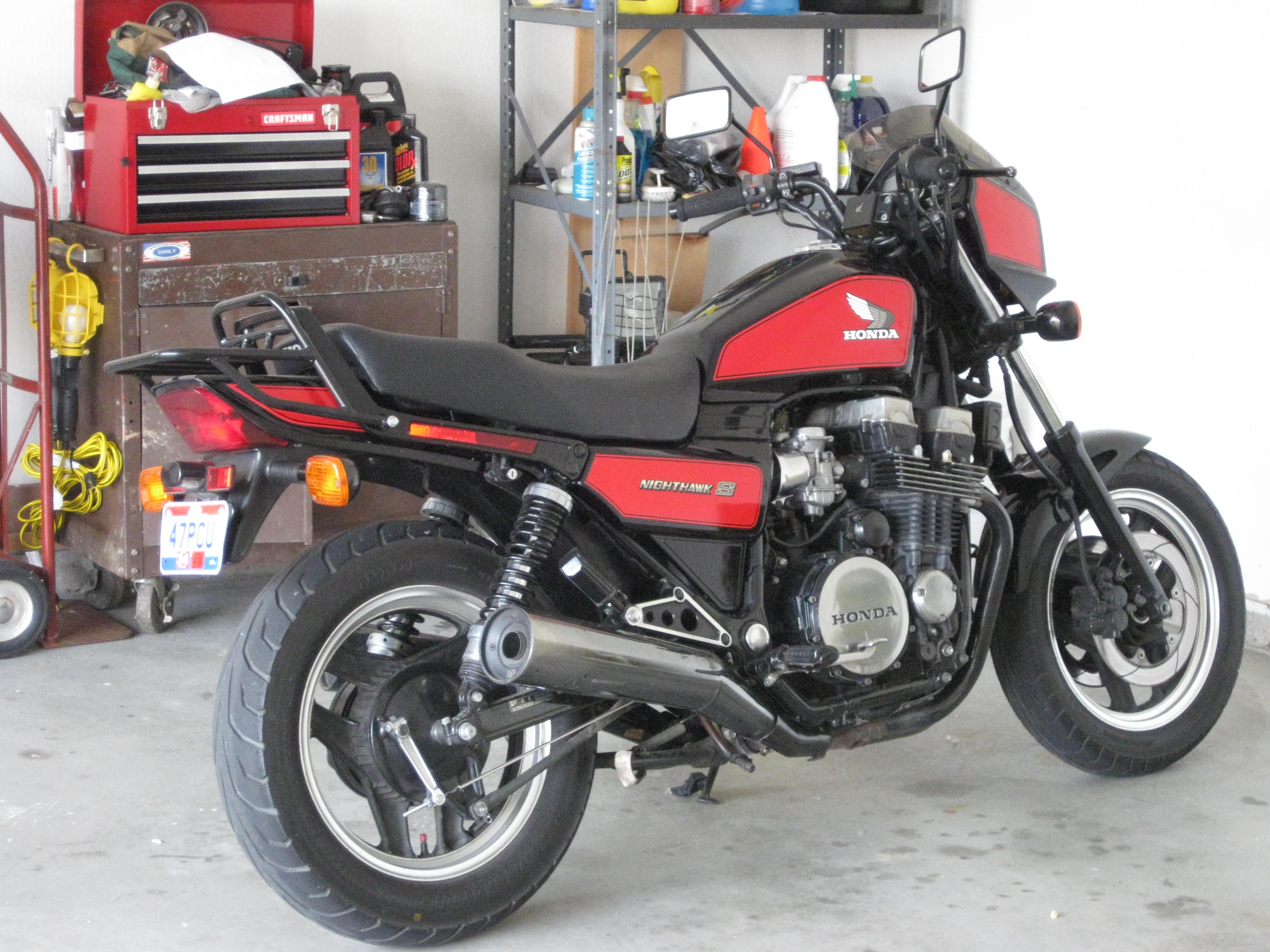
Honda Nighthawk 700 SC

The 700SC was similar to Honda's 650 Nighthawk, though the Nighthawk S featured a 700 cc engine, shaft drive and hydraulic lifters in a bike with a completely redesigned engine.
