= Honda CB1100 =

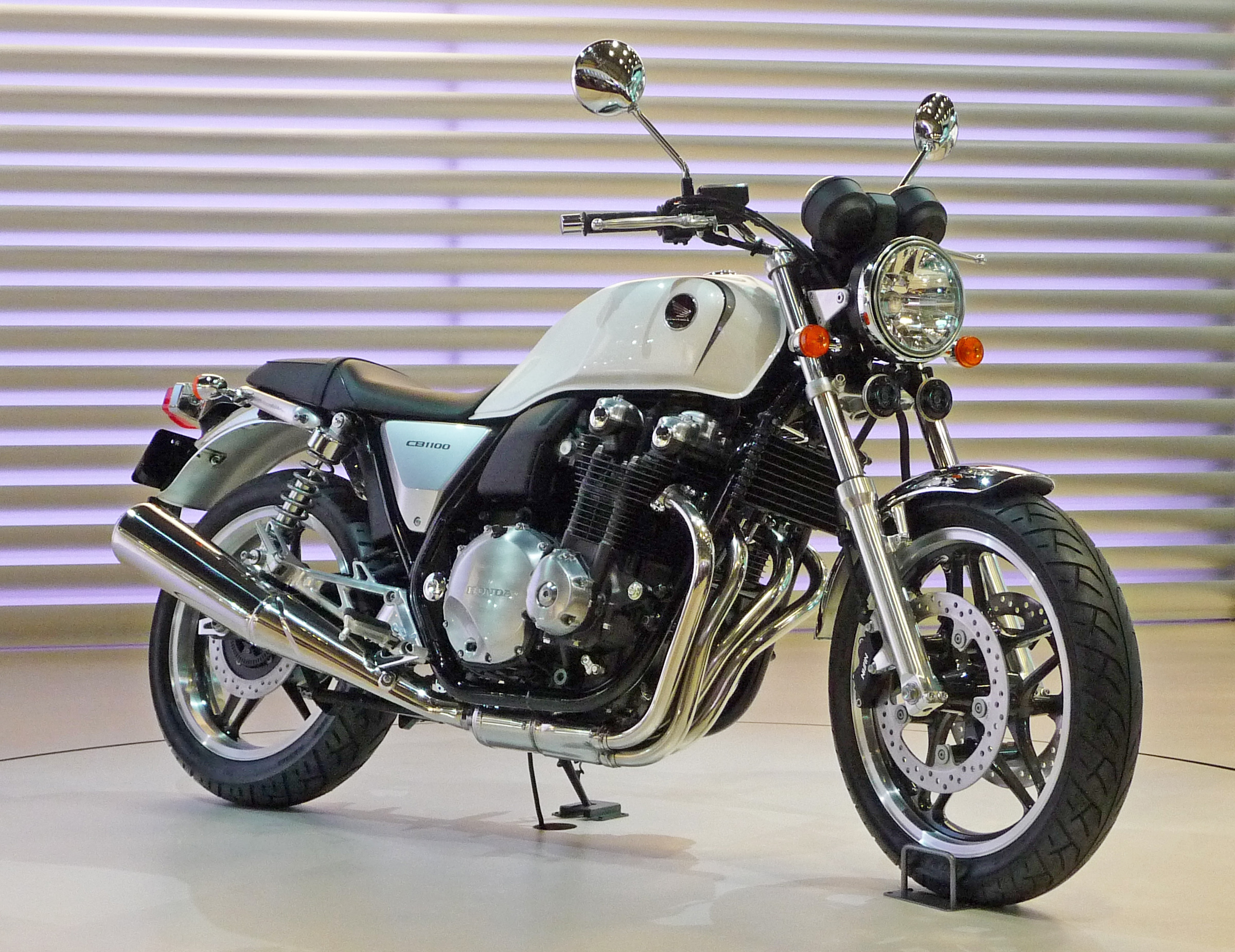
- Manufacturer: Honda
- Production: 2010–2022
- Assembly: Japan
- Predecessor: Honda CB750
- Class: Standard
- Engine: 1,140 cc (70 cu in) air- and oil-cooled 4-stroke 16-valve DOHC inline-four
- Bore / stroke: 73.5 mm × 67.2 mm (2.9 in × 2.6 in)
- Compression ratio: 9.5:1
- Top speed: 130 miles per hour (210 km/h)
- Power: Horsepower 88
- Transmission: 5-speed constant-mesh manual (2010–2013), 6-speed (2014–2022), chain-drive
- Frame type: Steel double-cradle
- Suspension: Front: 41 mm (1.6 in) telescopic fork with adjustable spring preload, 107 mm (4.2 in) axle travel (standard/EX); Rear: Swingarm, twin shock absorbers with adjustable spring preload, 114 mm (4.5 in) travel (standard/EX)
- Brakes: Front: Double 4-piston calipers with double 296 mm (11.7 in) discs (standard/EX); Rear: Single-piston caliper with single 256 mm (10.1 in) disc (standard/EX)
- Wheelbase: 1,485–1,490 mm (58.5–58.7 in)
- Dimensions: L: 2,180–2,200 mm (85.8–86.6 in); W: 800–835 mm (31.5–32.9 in); H: 1,100–1,130 mm (43.3–44.5 in)
- Seat height: 780–785 mm (30.7–30.9 in)
- Weight: 240 kg (540 lb) (wet)
- Fuel capacity: 16–17 L (3.5–3.7 imp gal; 4.2–4.5 US gal)

The Honda CB1100 is a 1,140 cc (70 cu in) air-cooled inline four-cylinder standard bike that was introduced by Honda in 2010 as a modern spiritual successor to the original CB750. At introduction the motorbike was available in Japan, Australia and New Zealand; it was later introduced to Europe and North America in 2013. The CB1100 had a limited release in the US where it was only offered for three model years: 2013, 2014 and 2017.

The CB1100 is styled as a Universal Japanese Motorcycle. The model underwent a revision in 2014, gaining a sixth gear and new gauge cluster. Honda also released the CB1100 Deluxe, an upgraded variant on the standard CB1100. The 2017 model was updated with front and back LED lights, a new lighter exhaust, a seamless fuel tank made of pressed aluminum, and the addition of a slipper clutch.

The CB1100 ended production in 2022.

== CB1100 Deluxe/EX ==
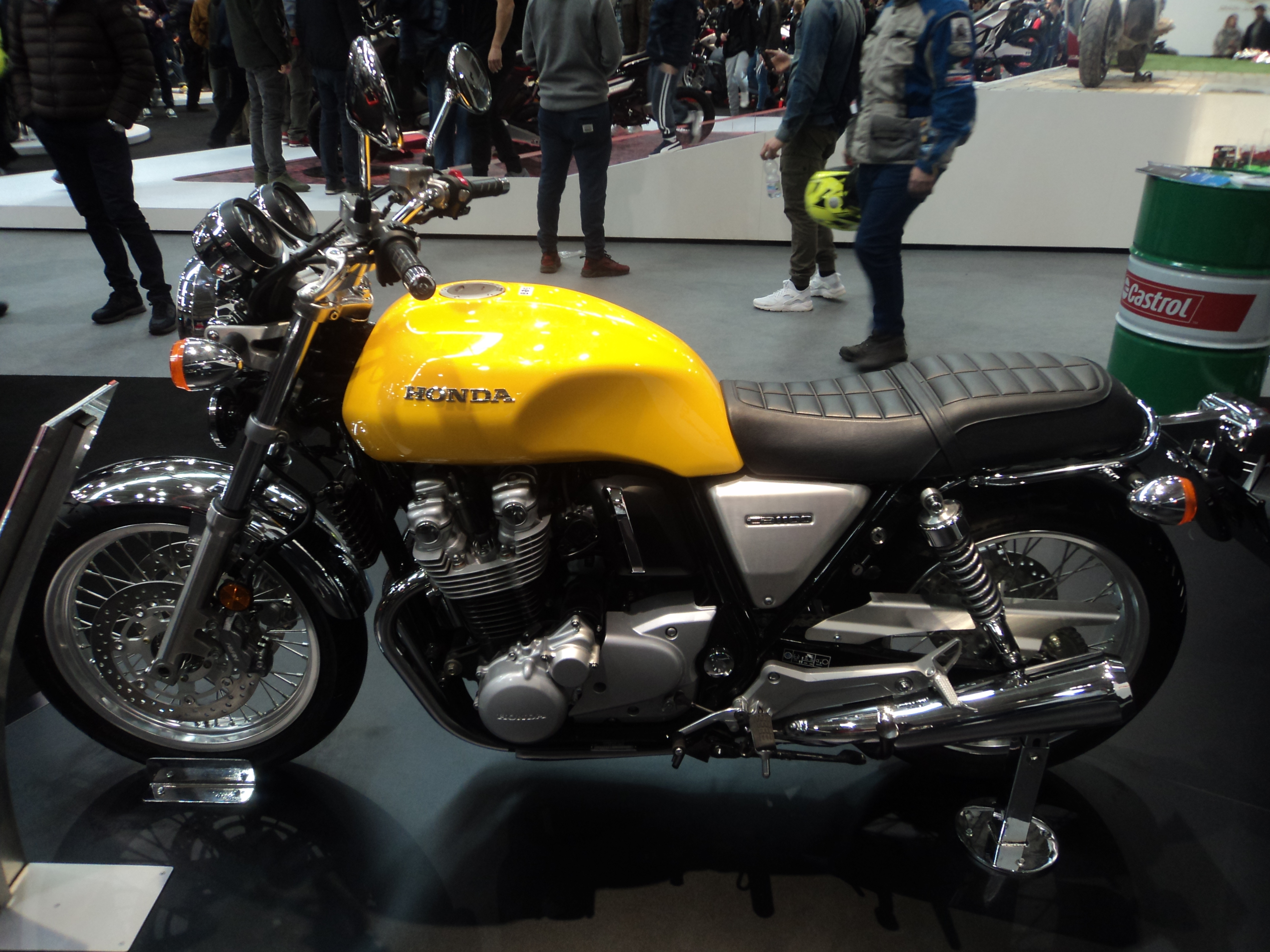
Honda CB1100 EX

Introduced in 2014 the Deluxe model has a 6 speed transmission, larger fuel tank (extra 0.7 gallons), 4-in-2 exhaust, ABS, modified seat and other details. In North America this model is labeled CB1100 DLX.

The CB1100 EX model variant in addition to the DLX also features wire wheels. As of 2014 it is available in Japan and Europe.

== CB1100 RS ==
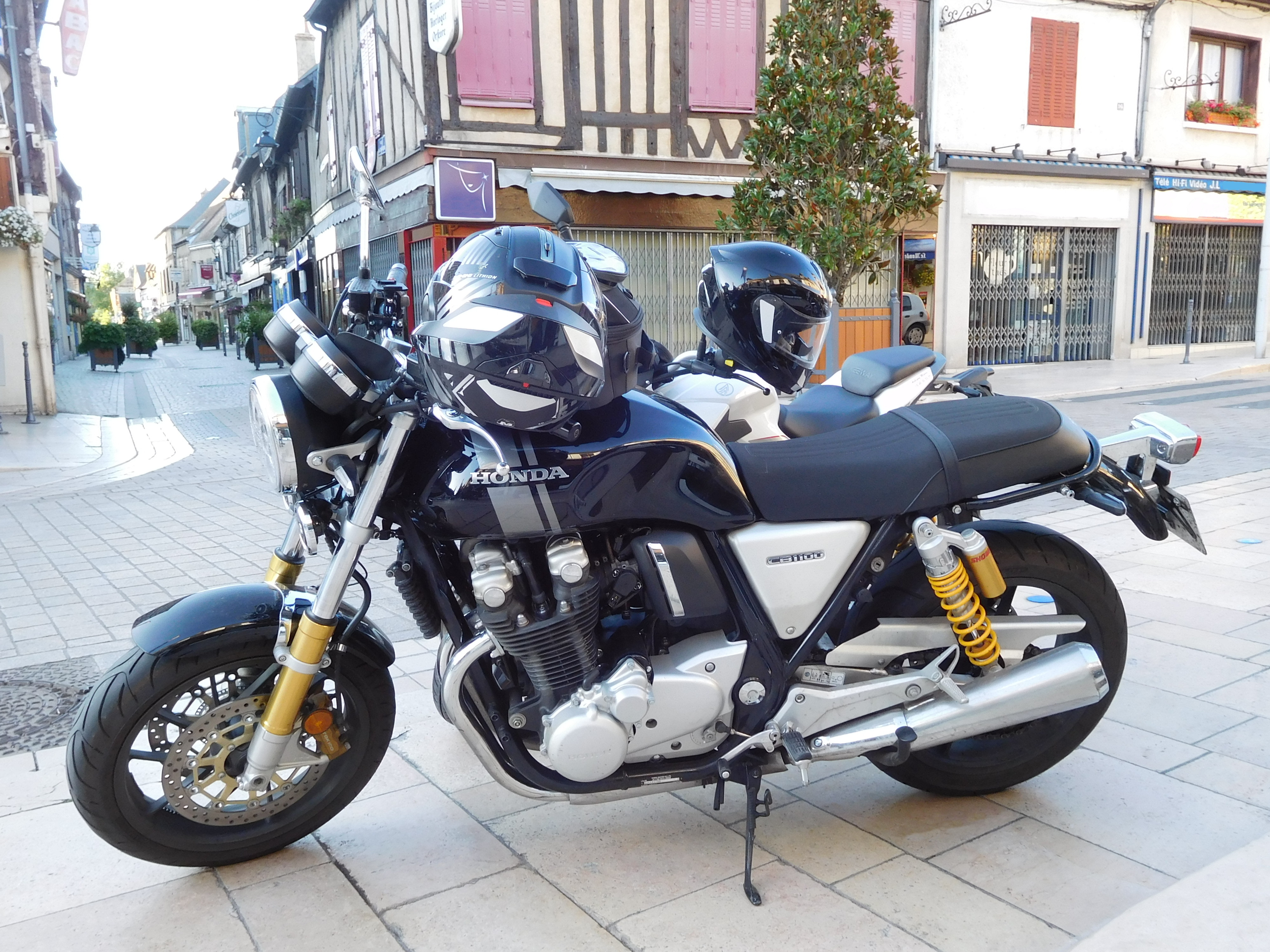
Honda CB1100 RS

The sports-oriented CB1100 RS model was released in the 2017 model year. This model has all lighting from LED lights, slightly revised engine, 17-inch aluminium wheels, shorter wheelbase by 5 mm, Tokico radial brake calipers, different caster angle, sportier suspension setup with dual bending valve two-piece Showa 43 mm fork, and sport-oriented tires.
