= Yamaha SR400 & SR500 =

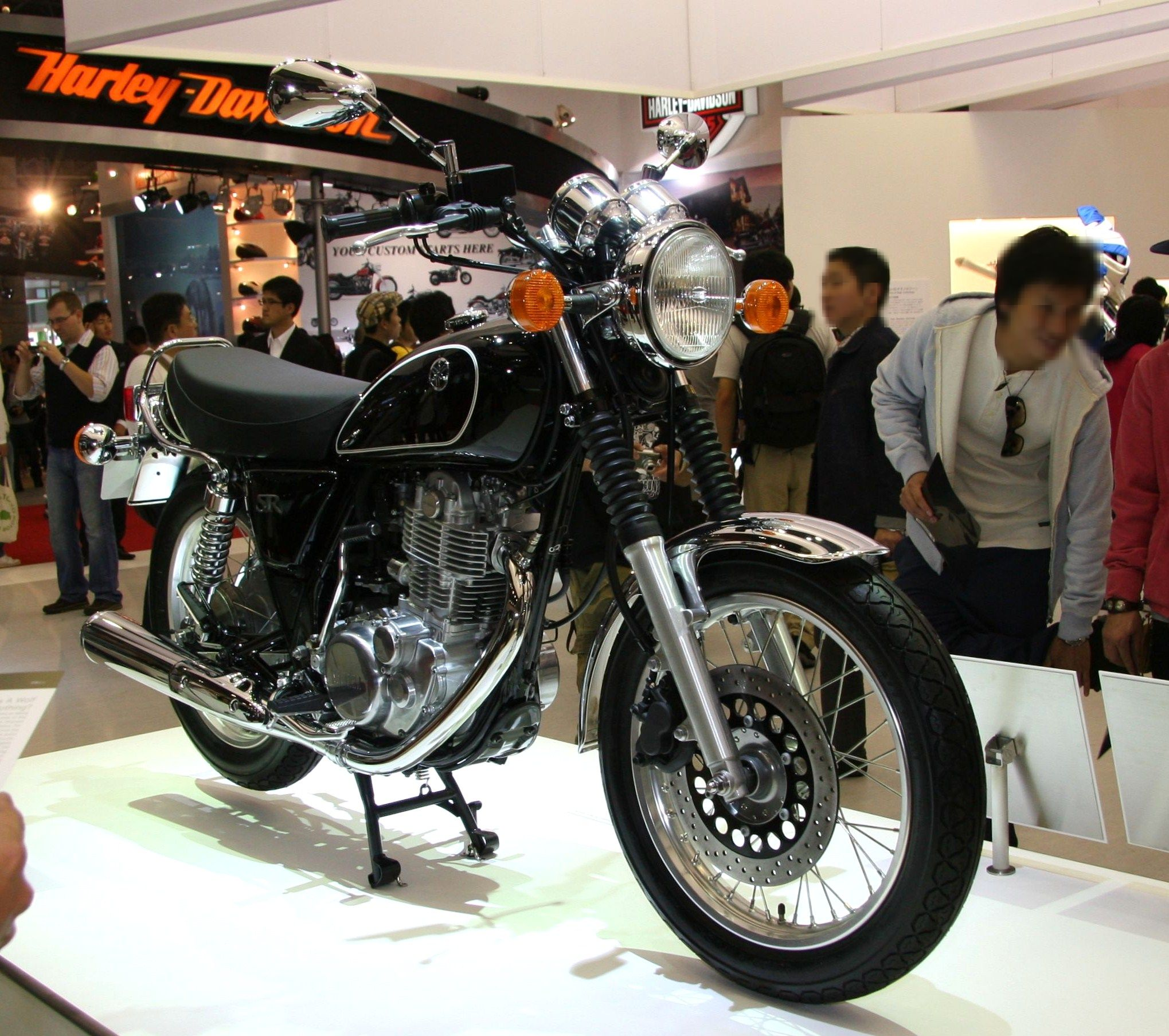
- Yamaha SR400 at the 2009 Tokyo Motor Show
- Manufacturer: Yamaha Motor Company
- Production: 1978−2021
- Assembly: Japan: Iwata, Shizuoka
- Class: Standard
- Engine: 499 cc (30.5 cu in) 4-stroke, air-cooled, SOHC, single-cylinder, 2-valve
- Bore / stroke: 87 mm × 84 mm (3.4 in × 3.3 in)
- Compression ratio: 9.0:1
- Top speed: SR500: 146 km/h (91 mph)
- Power: SR500: 23.5 kW (31.5 hp) @ 6,500 rpm
- Torque: SR500: 36.3 N⋅m (26.8 lbf⋅ft) @ 5,500 rpm
- Ignition type: CDI
- Transmission: 5-speed sequential manual
- Frame type: Half-duplex cradle
- Suspension: Front: 35 mm telescoping fork, 150 mm (5.9 in) travel Rear: 105 mm (4.1 in) travel, 5-way adjustable preload
- Brakes: Hydraulic disc or mechanical drum, depending on model year
- Tires: F: 3.50-19 or 3.50-18; R: 4.00-18
- Rake, trail: 27.5 deg, 117 mm (4.6 in)
- Wheelbase: 1,405 mm (55.3 in)
- Dimensions: L: 2,105 mm (82.9 in); W: 845 mm (33.3 in); H: 1,155 mm (45.5 in)
- Seat height: 810 mm (32 in)
- Weight: SR500: 158 kg (348 lb) (dry)
- Fuel capacity: 12 or 14 litres (2.6 or 3.1 imperial gallons; 3.2 or 3.7 US gallons)
- Oil capacity: 2.4 litres (2.5 US quarts)
- Fuel consumption: 4.8 L/100 km (59 mpg_{‑imp}; 49 mpg_{‑US})
- Related: Yamaha SR250

The Yamaha SR400 (1978–2021) and SR500 (1978–1999) are single-cylinder, air-cooled, two-passenger motorcycles manufactured in Japan by Yamaha Motor Company as a street version of the Yamaha XT500, with a standard riding posture and styling recalling the Universal Japanese Motorcycles of the 1970s. The two models differ by their engines: the SR400 engine has a lower displacement, achieved with a different crankshaft and shorter piston stroke and both models feature only kickstarting, i.e., no electric starter.

The SR400 had been marketed in the Japanese Domestic Market (JDM) from 1978 to 2021 and was introduced to Europe, the Americas and Oceania in 2014. Its engine capacity complies with JDM 400 cc licensing restrictions.

The SR500 was marketed in Asia and Oceania (1978–1999), North America (1978–1981); and Europe (1978–1983), and was not marketed in the Japanese market.

The SR was originally developed under the design credo "easy to use", and when Yamaha's Technical Director wrenched his ankle while testing a prototype, easier starting became a priority—and Yamaha developed a decompression lever and sight glass system.

The SR was styled by Atsushi Ishiyama with Yamaha presenting a pre-production prototype to US dealers in late 1975. Ishiyama said of the bike's styling: "Our choice was to design the new SR500 with a strong family image and a strong link to our first four stroke, the XS 650 twin, which was also inspired by British design."

== SR400 ==
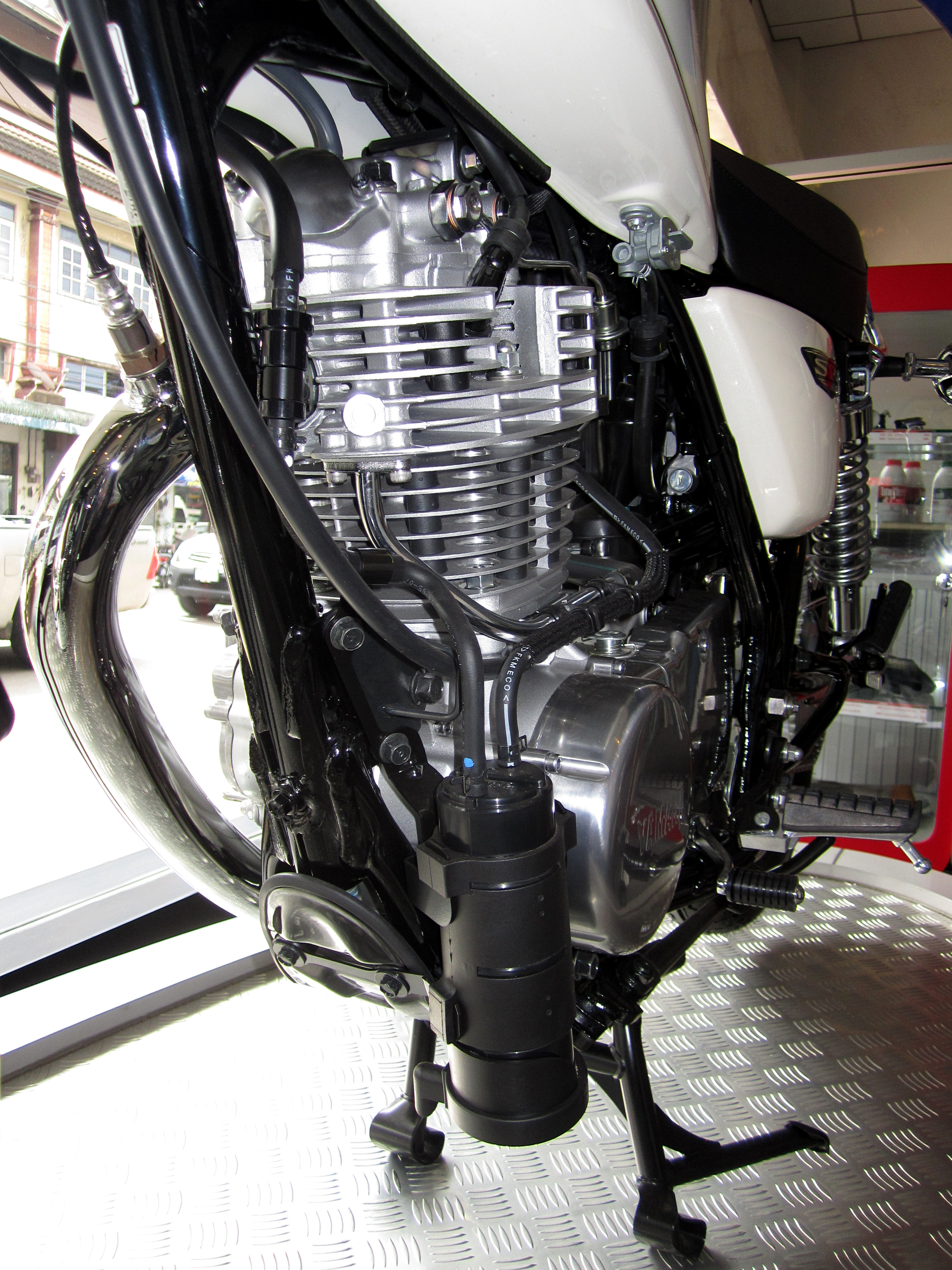
Yamaha SR400 (2014) fitted with an EVAP canister to reduce emissions.

Yamaha has marketed the SR400 in the JDM since model year 1978, with a production hiatus for model years 2008–2009. Beginning with model year 2010, the SR400 had fuel injection and a catalyst muffler to comply with tighter emission restrictions. Yamaha began marketing the bike in Europe, Australia and the US in 2014.

The SR400 has an air-cooled 4-stroke single cylinder SOHC 2-valve engine with a dry-sump, with the downtubes of the motorcycle's frame serving as the engine's oil reservoir and cooling system, thereby eliminating the need for an external oil cooler, reducing engine pumping losses, and allowing increased ground clearance as well as reduced overall width. The bike's semi-double cradle frame uses high-strength steel.

The SR400 had a kick-starter and no electric start. To aid with starting, the bike had a sight glass on the right side of the cylinder head indicating the optimal cylinder position for starting, as well as a decompressor lever on the left handlebar.

The fuel injection system has a throttle position sensor on the throttle body; O2 sensor in the top of the exhaust header-pipe; temperature sensor; thermo unit at the upper rear of the cylinder head; and a lean angle sensor to interrupt the fuel injection pump, in case, for example, the bike is on its side. The air filter is a disposable oil-coated paper type held in place by the airbox cover. The electrical system has an automatic cut-out to stop the engine when left idling longer than 20 minutes. The exhaust system has an exhaust pipe coated with a nano-film to prevent discoloration and includes a 3-way honeycomb-type catalytic converter to meet EU and US (50 state) emission requirements.

The instrumentation includes a cable-driven analog speedometer and tachometer with a stainless steel bezel, fuel low-level indicator, engine-trouble warning, turn signal, neutral, and high beam light indicators. The left-side handlebar controls include hazard, horn, high and low beam control, flash-to-pass switch and turn indicator controls. The right side controls include the hazard light switch as well as the engine kill switch.

With 18" front and rear tires, the SR400 has spoked wheels with lightweight aluminium rims, front disc and rear drum brakes as well as a center stand, chromed fenders, headlight pod and grab bar. A sealed Valve Regulated Lead Acid (VRLA) battery is located underneath the seat, on its side. Earlier models had CDI ignition; post-2010 models have transistor controlled ignition (TCI).

== SR500 ==
The 1978–1979 US version of the SR500 had front and rear disc brakes while the 1980–1981 models had a front disc and rear drum brake, while the European 78–79 models had spoked wheels, front disc and rear drum brake. Cast aluminum wheels on US models (rear disk brake) for 78-79 were not tubeless applicable while (drum brake) for 80-81 were stamped tubeless applicable and so equipped. By the end of 1981, the SR500 was discontinued in the US market, while continuing in Europe and Japan. The model ended production in 1999.

The SR500 employed a slightly modified version of its large single-cylinder from the XT500/TT500 and had electronic ignition as well as a handle bar mounted compression release lever to make kick starting much easier.

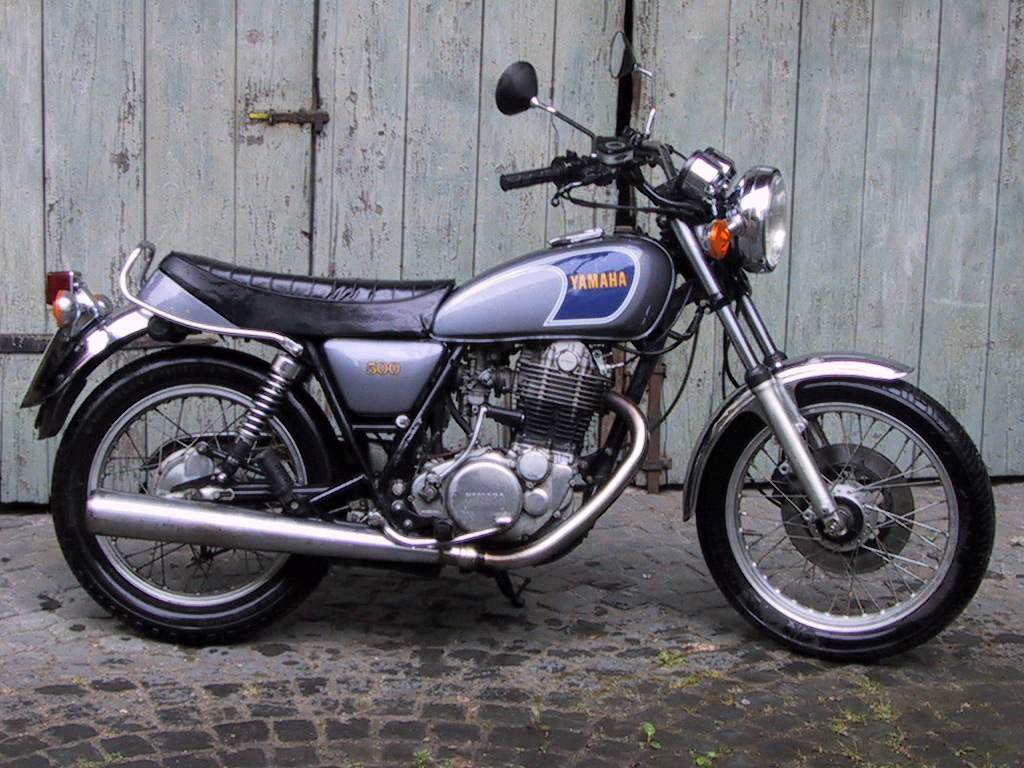
Yamaha SR500

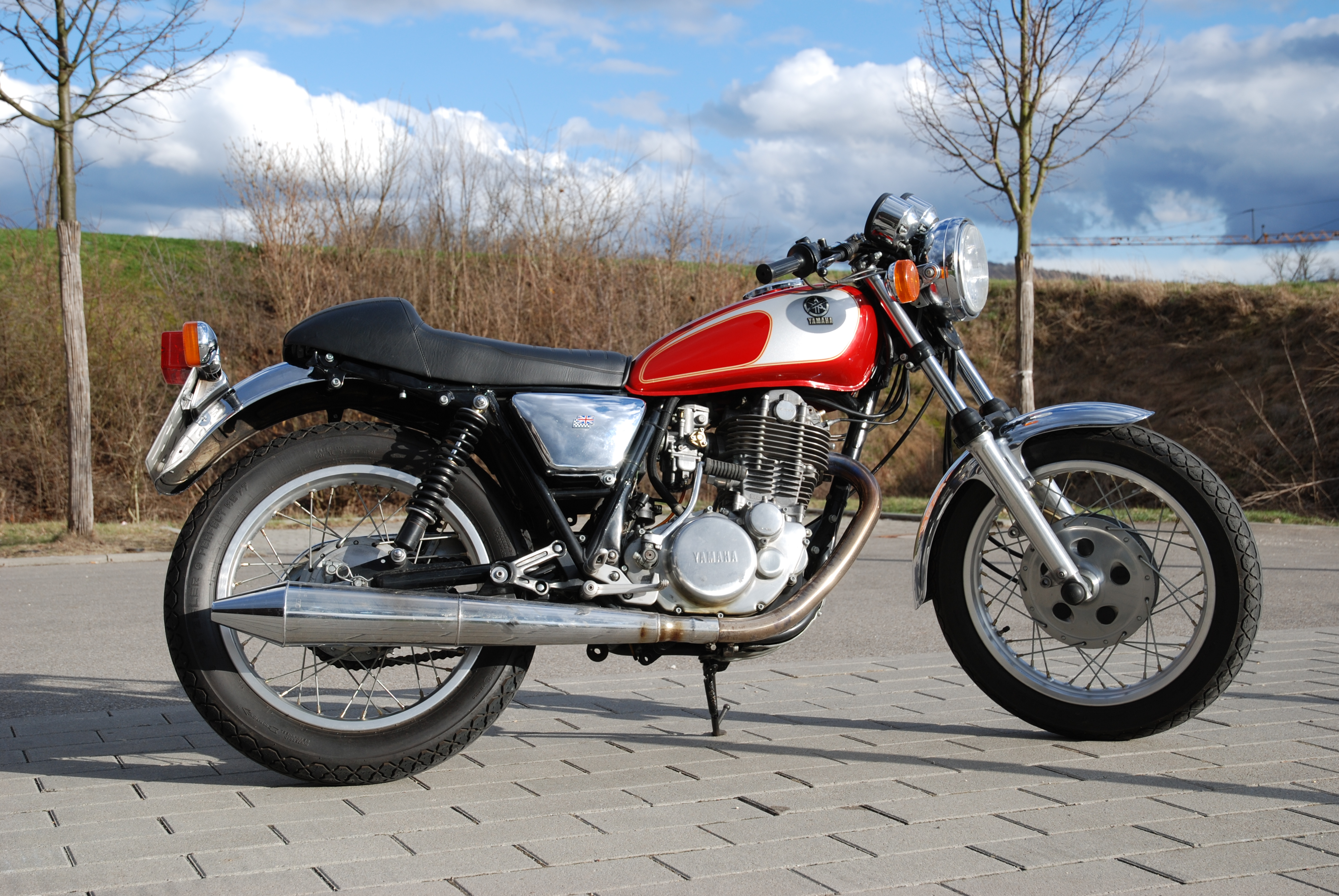
Modified 1985 Yamaha SR500 café racer

The SR500 won Moto of the Year award twice from Motorrad, the German motorcycling magazine.
