= Honda CB750K (RC01) =

Japanese motorcycle

Honda CB750K(Z)
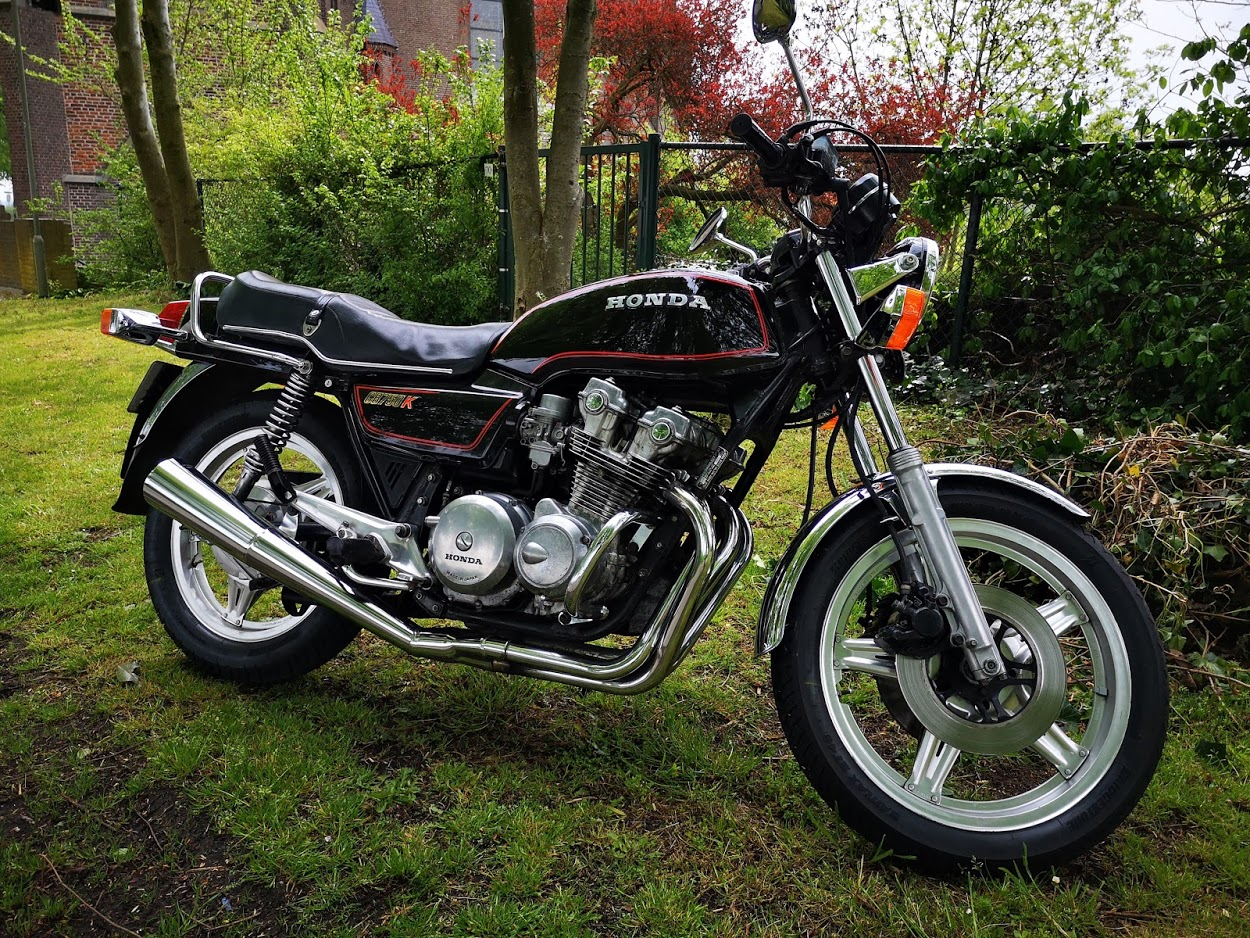
- Honda CB 750 K
- Manufacturer: Honda
- Production: 1978-1982
- Predecessor: CB750 Four
- Successor: CB750F
- Class: Sport bike or standard
- Engine: 743 cc (45.3 cu in) DOHC air-cooled straight four
- Top speed: 125 mph (201 km/h)
- Power: 58 kW (78 hp) @ 9000 rpm
- Torque: 49 lbf⋅ft (66 N⋅m) @ 7000 rpm
- Transmission: 5-speed manual, chain final drive
- Suspension: Front: telescopic forks Rear: swingarm with two spring/shock units.
- Brakes: Front 275 mm double disc / Rear 180mm drum
- Wheelbase: 1,520 mm (60 in)
- Dimensions: L: 2,200 mm (87 in); W: 880 mm (35 in); H: 1,160 mm (46 in)
- Seat height: 800 mm (31 in)
- Weight: 233 kg (514 lb) (dry)
- Fuel capacity: 20 L (4.4 imp gal; 5.3 US gal)
- Fuel consumption: 7.3 L (1.6 imp gal; 1.9 US gal) per 100 km (62 mi)

The Honda CB750K (model RC01) is a motorcycle model by the Japanese vehicle manufacturer Honda.

== The new 750 ==
At the 1978 IFMA in Cologne the new CB 750 was presented as the successor to the CB 750 four for Europe and available for sale later that year. With a new DOHC engine design and numerous other new features it was presented as "what happens when you keep winning races".

== New features ==
The DOHC 16 valve engine was based on the engine in the RCB943 and RCB997 featuring four valves per cylinder, and next to the timing chain driving the exhaust cam, a second chain driving the intake cam. The engine was also better balanced by moving the alternator from the left to the right side.

Next to the new engine, new features like the transistorized ignition system was promising smooth performance and greater economy. It had increased braking performance with double discs up front and a lower, deeply padded seat for greater riding comfort and handling. Increased suspension travel for the front forks and rear FVQ damper, and a taper roller bearing for the head for smoother riding. Improved safety features like an H4 headlamp and double rear brake light bulbs were also advertised.

== Technical details ==
=== Engine and power transmission ===
- Air-cooled 4-cylinder 4-stroke engine with chain driven camshaft (DOHC), 4 valves per cylinder (total of 16), via tappets actuated
- Power: 57 kW (77 hp at 9,000 min -1 .), Max torque 66 Nm at 7000 min -1
- Average piston speed : 2.07 m / s per 1,000 min −1
- Top speeds: 200 km / h (lying solo), 187 km / h (sitting solo), 179 km / h (with pillion passenger)
- 743 cm^{3} displacement with 62 mm (2.4 in) bore and 62 mm (2.4 in) stroke
- Compression ratio 9: 1
- Electric starter
- Contactless transistor-controlled battery ignition with mechanical centrifugal force adjustment
- Pressure circulation lubrication
- One-piece steel crankshaft with 5 sliding bearings
- 4 Keihin equal pressure carburetors with a diameter of 30 mm (1.2 in)
- Wet multi-plate clutch
- Constant-mesh 5-speed gear
- Three-phase - alternator (260 Watt at 5000 min -1 ), battery (12 V / 14 Ah)
- 4-in-4 exhaust system (sometimes shown as 4-in-2-in-4)
- Primary drive via inverted tooth chain
- Secondary drive via roller chain

=== Frame ===
- Double-loop tubular steel frame with a single-sided unscrewable support on the right for (dis) assembly of the motor
- Rear swing arm stored in plastic bushings (needle roller bearings from the end of 1980)
- Ground clearance 150 mm (5.9 in)
- Foot peg height 355 mm (14.0 in)
- Hydraulically damped telescopic fork at the front (35 mm (1.4 in)) with 160 mm (6.3 in) travel
- 2 hydraulically damped spring struts at the rear, springs adjustable in 5 positions
- Double 275 mm (10.8 in) disc brake with single-piston calipers at the front
- Simplex drum brake 180 mm (7.1 in) at the rear
- Comstar aluminum wheels with tubeless tires (3.25-19 / 4.00-18)
- 20 L (4.4 imp gal; 5.3 US gal) steel tank

=== Colors ===
The CB 750 K (Z) was available in four base colors: blue, black, red and brown.

Color code	Name	Implementation
R-104C-U	Candy Muse Red/Candy Burgundy	Metallic paint with gold or light red striping
YR-106C-U	Candy Bayard Brown	Metallic brown with gold striping (Canada only)
PB-107C-U	Candy Tanzanight Blue	Metallic blue with gold striping
NH-1	Black	Black with red striping
