= Honda CB500 =

Honda CB500 may refer to several Honda middle-weight motorcycles:

- Honda CB500 Four (1971-1973)
- Honda CB500T (1975-1976)
- Honda CB500 twin (1993-2003)
- Honda 500 twins since 2013

== See also ==
- Honda CB series
