= Yamaha SR250 =

Yamaha SR250 (1st gen.)
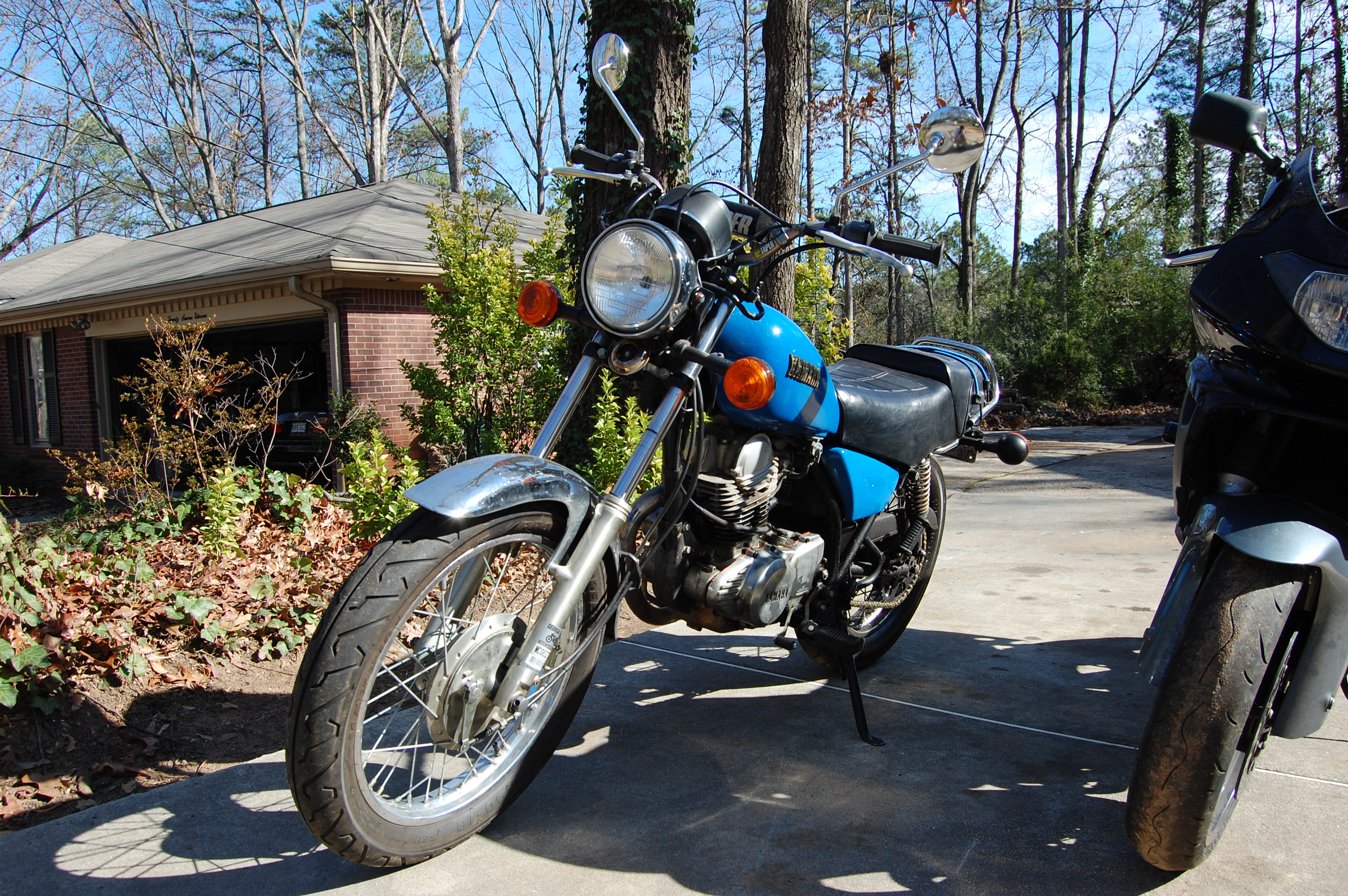
- Manufacturer: Yamaha Motor Company
- Also called: Exciter I (US)
- Parent company: Yamaha Corporation
- Production: 1980–1984
- Class: Standard
- Engine: 249 cc (15.2 cu in) SOHC 2-valves per cyl. single
- Bore / stroke: 75.0 mm × 56.5 mm (2.95 in × 2.22 in)
- Compression ratio: 9.2:1
- Top speed: 130 km/h (80 mph)
- Power: 21.0 bhp (15.7 kW) @ 8,000 rpm (claimed)
- Torque: 18.8 lb⋅ft (25.5 N⋅m) @ 6,500 rpm (claimed)
- Ignition type: Transistorized electronic ignition
- Transmission: Multi-plate wet-clutch, 5-speed sequential manual, chain-drive
- Frame type: Steel. Stressed member engine
- Suspension: Front: telescopic fork, 140 mm (5.5 in) travel. Rear:Swingarm, 84 mm (3.3 in) travel
- Brakes: Front: 159 mm (6.25 in) drum Rear: 130 mm (5.2 in) drum
- Tires: Yokohama. Front: 3.00-18; Rear: 120/80-16
- Rake, trail: 27.5°, 120 mm (4.8 in)
- Wheelbase: 1,340 mm (52.75 in)
- Dimensions: W: 710 mm (28.0 in)
- Seat height: 740 mm (29.0 in)
- Weight: 130 kg (287 lb) (½ tank) (wet)
- Fuel capacity: 10 L; 2.2 imp gal (2.7 US gal)
- Fuel consumption: 76 mpg_{‑US} (3.1 L/100 km; 91 mpg_{‑imp})
- Related: Yamaha SR400

The Yamaha SR250 is a single cylinder motorcycle made by Yamaha Motor Company initially from 1980 to 1984 and then 2001 to 2004 for a second generation. It shares styling with the larger Yamaha SR500. The first generation had a 249 cc (15.2 cu in) displacement and the second generation was 239 cc (14.6 cu in).

== History ==
The SR250 was produced from 1980 to 1982 in the United States, as well as from 1982 to 2002 in Spain, in two versions. While it has stylistic similarities with its older brothers the SR500 and SR400, the SR250 is very much a commuter bike. In 1980 Cycle World's test of the SR250, called the Exciter I in the US with added high, cruiser style handlebars, found a standing 1/4-mile (0.40 km) time of 16.36 seconds at 122.89 km/h (76.36 mph), acceleration from 0 to 97 km/h (0 to 60 mph) of 11.5 seconds, and a top speed of 130 km/h (80 mph). Braking distance from 60 to 0 mph (97 to 0 km/h) was 38 m (125 ft), and tested fuel consumption was 76 mpg_{‑US} (3.1 L/100 km; 91 mpg_{‑imp}), giving a range of 269 km (167 mi).

== 2001 model ==
Yamaha SR250 (2nd gen.)
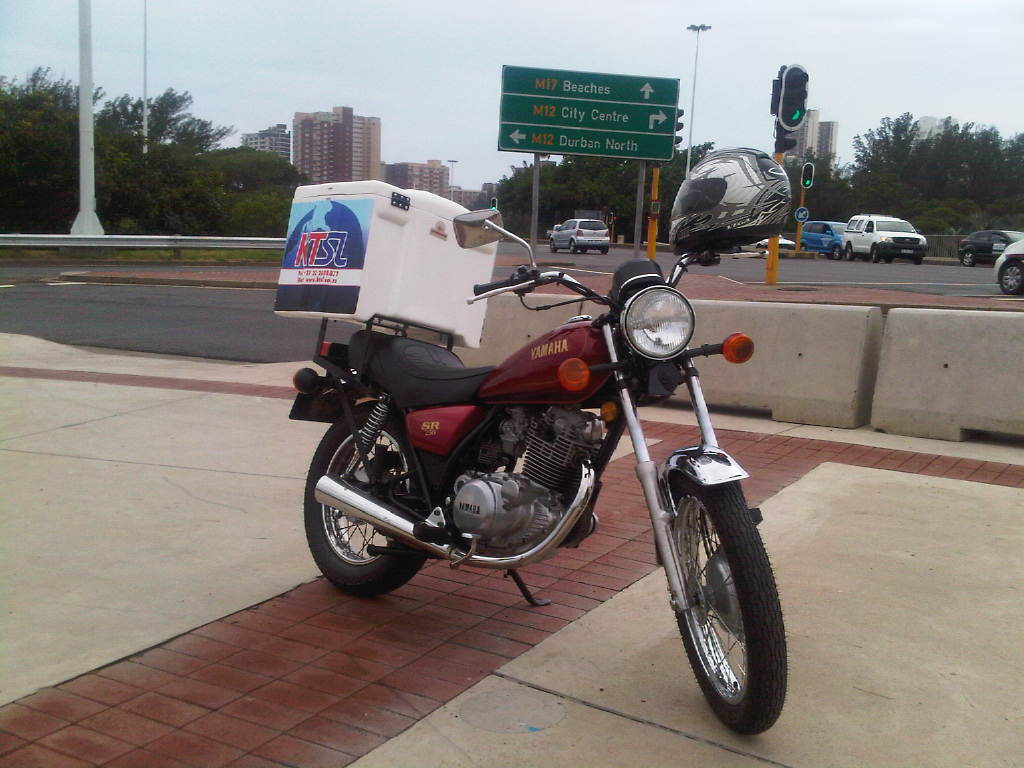
- Manufacturer: Yamaha
- Production: 2001–2004
- Engine: 239 cc (14.6 cu in) single, air cooled, four-stroke
- Bore / stroke: 73.5 mm x 56.5 mm
- Transmission: 5-speed sequential manual transmission
- Brakes: Front: Single disc with 2-piston calipers Rear: 180 mm drum
- Tires: 90/90-19, 3.50-18
- Wheelbase: 1350 mm
- Seat height: 735 mm
- Related: Yamaha SR500

In 2001, Yamaha released their most recent SR250 due to popular demand for reliable commuters. This model is modeled after the SR500. Despite sharing the SR designation, these bikes are very different. The engines are different in the most fundamental sense and the frames are also very different - no seat or tank components are interchangeable without frame modification.
