= 1983 motorcycle tariff =

United States tariff

The 1983 motorcycle tariff, or Memorandum on Heavyweight Motorcycle Imports, was a presidential memorandum ordering a 45% tariff on heavyweight motorcycles imported to the United States, signed by President Ronald Reagan on April 1, 1983, on the US International Trade Commission's (USITC) recommendation to approve Harley-Davidson's petition for import relief. The tariff expired in 1988.

== Background ==
Harley-Davidson was the sole surviving American motorcycle manufacturer. All of the company's models in production were heavyweight motorcycles. Before the imposition of the tariff, Harley-Davidson was facing a sharp sales decline, mainly due to the competition of Japanese motorcycle companies. Less than a decade before, Harley-Davidson had a 100% market share of 1000cc or larger motorcycles within the US. A decade later, its market share had fallen to less than 15%. Honda, Yamaha, Suzuki, and Kawasaki undercut Harley Davidson by 1500-2000 USD per vehicle. In 1980 Harley-Davidson did US$289 million in sales, which slumped to around US$200 million in just two years. Employees also saw a harsh decline in wages and hours worked. The unsold inventory of bikes doubled during the time period, again due to the undercutting of Japanese counterparts.

== Request and imposition ==
In the early 1980s, Harley-Davidson petitioned the USITC, saying that Japanese manufacturers were importing motorcycles into the US in such volume as to harm or threaten to harm domestic producers. The USITC agreed (by a 2–1 vote) that Harley-Davidson was entitled to relief, and recommended the tariff structure that was later implemented by the Reagan Administration. Unlike the USITC's recommendation though, Reagan also implemented tariffs onto European manufacturers. The tariff applied to all imported motorcycles with engine displacements greater than 700 cc (43 cu in). Reagan signed a memorandum ordering the tariff on April 1, 1983, and signed Presidential Proclamation 5050 on April 15, enacting 97 Stat. 1574 to the United States Code.

== Format of the tariff ==
During the first year of the tariff, the tariff was set at 45% then dropping to 35% in the second year. In the third year, the tariff dropped to 20%, then 15% in the fourth year, and 10% in the fifth year. The total tariffs on foreign motorcycles were 49.4%, 39.4% 24.4%, 19.4% and 14.4% in each year respectively. In order to avoid harming small scale manufacturers, tariff-rate quotas were implemented. These quotas exempted manufacturers from the additional tariffs implemented by the bill, but still required them to pay the 4.5% rate on all motorcycles (as part of a tariff still exists to the present day). 5,000 units (increasing yearly to 6,000, 7,000, 8,500 and 10,000) of motorcycles were tariff exempt for motorcycles manufactured in the Federal Republic of Germany. This tariff applied almost exclusively to BMW motorbikes. 6,000 units (increasing 1,000 yearly) were exempt for motorcycles imported from Japan. 4,000 units (increasing yearly by 1,000) were tariff exempt for all other countries. This tariff did not apply to any bikes manufactured within the country, which made the 90,000 Honda and Kawasaki bikes manufactured within the US exempt.

== Negotiation with Japanese manufacturers ==
Harley-Davidson subsequently rejected offers of assistance from Japanese motorcycle makers. The legislation was also met with great resistance from Japanese authorities, who threatened to file unfair-trade charges against the United States in Geneva. Motorcycle prices were not projected to rise until the backlog of motorcycles had been sold, and then were projected to rise by 10%.

Harley-Davidson did offer to drop the request for the tariff in exchange for loan guarantees from the Japanese.

== Removal ==
In March 1987, Harley Davidson made an "unprecedented action", and requested the removal of the tariff. "We no longer need tariff relief to compete," said Vaughn L. Beals Jr., Harley-Davidson's chairman and CEO.The tariff was removed by Ronald Reagan on October 9, 1987, where he claimed the action would not harm the domestic industry.
