= List of equipment of the Royal Brunei Police Force =

Royal Brunei Police Forces weapons

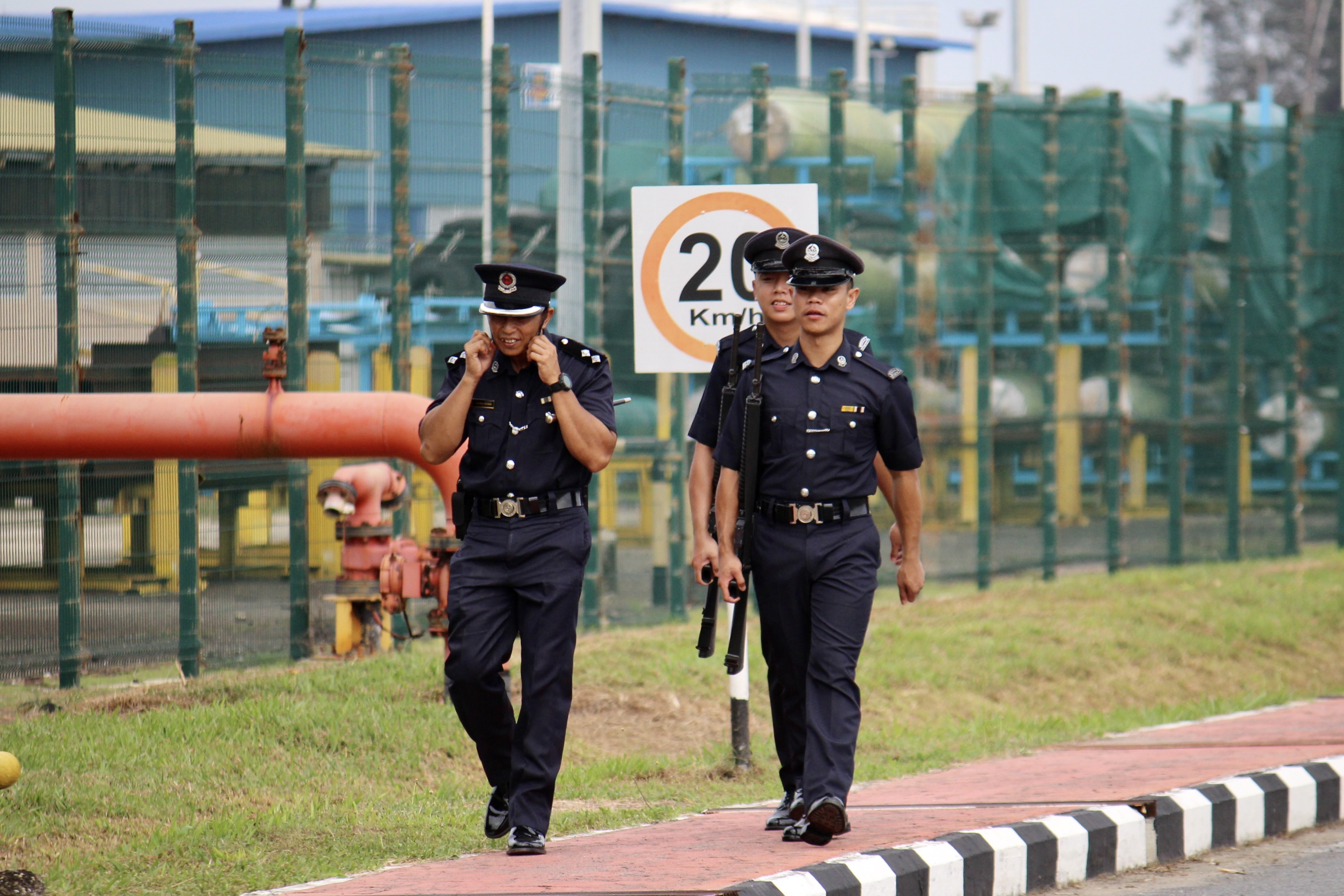
Brunei policemen armed with M16A2 rifles in 2022

The equipment of the Royal Brunei Police Force (RBPF) can be subdivided into: weapons and vehicles.

== Vehicles ==
=== Ground vehicles ===
| Vehicle | Image | Type | Origin | In service | Notes | Ref |
Mobile patrol vehicles
| Mitsubishi Lancer EX | | Compact | Japan | 2013–present | Standard patrol car | |
| Proton Wira | | Compact | Malaysia | 2002/2003–present | | |
| Toyota Corolla (E110/170) | | Compact | Japan | | Standard patrol car | |
| Mitsubishi 380 | | Mid-size | Japan | 2006–present | Sometimes used as unmarked patrol car | |
| Chevrolet Epica | | Mid-size | United States | | Standard patrol car | |
| Ford Mondeo | | Mid-size | United Kingdom | | Standard patrol car | |
| Toyota Camry | | Mid-size | Japan | | Used as a staff car | |
| Nissan Teana (L33) | | Mid-size | Japan | | Used as a staff car | |
| Humber Hawk | | Mid-size | United Kingdom | c. 1963 | ~6 (6 in 1963) | |
| Holden HK | | Mid-size | Australia | c. 1968 | ~3 (3 in 1970) | |
| BMW 7 Series (E65) | | Full-size | Germany | | Unmarked patrol car | |
| BMW 7 Series (G11) | | Full-size | Germany | | Used as VIP escort | |
| BMW 7 Series (G70) | | Full-size | Germany | 2026-present | | |
| Lexus LS450 | | Full-size | Japan | | Used by Special Operations Squad | |
| Holden Commodore | | Executive | Australia | | Used as VIP escort | |
| BMW 520i | | Executive | Germany | | Used as VIP escort | |
| BMW 3 Series (G20) | | Compact executive | Germany | 2026-present | Unmarked patrol car | |
| Lexus GS | | Compact executive | Japan | | Used as VIP escort | |
| Toyota Vios (XP40/XP150) | | Subcompact | Japan | | Standard patrol car | |
| Toyota Hilux | | Pickup | Japan | | Used by water police | |
| Nissan Patrol (Y61) | | Pickup | Japan | | Standard patrol car | |
| Ford Ranger | | Pickup | United States | | Standard patrol car | |
| Mitsubishi Pajero (V20/80) | | Full-size | Japan | | Standard patrol car | |
| Toyota Land Cruiser (J100) | | Full-size | Japan | | Used by the Special Operations Squad | |
| Lexus LX450 | | Full-size | Japan | | Used by the Special Operations Squad | |
| Mitsubishi Pajero Sport | | Mid-size | Japan | 2021–present | Standard patrol car | |
| Toyota Fortuner (AN50/60) | | Mid-size | Japan | | Standard patrol car | |
| Land Rover Defender | | Medium-size | United Kingdom | 1960s–90s | ~29 (9 in 1963; 5 in 1967; 1 in 1970; 14 in 1971) | |
Motorcycles
| Suzuki GSX750P | | Standard | Japan | | Standard police motorcycle | |
| Yamaha Tracer 900 | | Sport touring | Japan | | Standard police motorcycle | |
| Honda GL1800C | | Sport touring | Japan | | Replaced the Suzuki GV1400 Cavalcade in ceremonial roles; sometimes unmarked | |
| Honda CBF1000F | | Sport touring | Japan | | Standard police motorcycle | |
| Honda ST1300P | | Sport touring | Japan | | Standard police motorcycle | |
| BMW R80G/S | | Dual-sport | Germany | | | |
| Honda Dio | | Scooter | Japan | | | |
| Yamaha Cygnus | | Scooter | Japan | | | |
| Honda Super Cub | | Scooter | Japan | c. 1963 | ~24 (15 in 1963; 5 in 1966; 4 in 1967) | |
Transport vehicles
| Mitsubishi Fuso Rosa | | Minibus | Japan | | | |
| Toyota Coaster (B20/B30) | | Minibus | Japan | | | |
| Toyota HiAce | | Minibus | Japan | | | |
| Mercedes-Benz Sprinter (903) | | Van | Germany | | Used by airport police; equipped with X-ray machine. | |
| Mitsubishi L300 | | Van | Japan | | | |
| Nissan Urvan (E25) | | Van | Japan | | | |
| Morris Commercial J2 | | Van | United Kingdom | c. 1971 | ~5 (5 in 1971) | |
| Toyota Dyna | | Medium-duty | Japan | | | |
| Bedford RL | | Medium-duty | United Kingdom | c. 1963 | ~11 (7 in 1963; 1 in 1966; 2 in 1967; 1 in 1971) | |
| Mitsubishi BM117LR | | Coach | Japan | | Used by Mobile Command Unit | |
Rescue and medical vehicles
| Ford Transit | | Van | United States | | Used as an ambulance during large events Used by Crime Scene Unit (CSU) | |
| Isuzu NPR | | Medium-duty | Japan | | Used as a tow truck | |
Armored vehicles
| Mercedes-Benz Atego | | Large goods | Germany | | Riot-control vehicle; fitted with water cannons | |

=== Watercraft ===
| Vehicle | Image | Type | Origin | In service | Notes | Ref |
Marine vehicles
| 8.8 m patrol boat | | Boat | Brunei | | Locally built | |
| 9.5m interceptor boat | | Boat | Malaysia | | | |
| 14.5 m patrol boat | | Boat | Singapore | In service: PDB11 PDB12 PDB13 PDB14 PDB15 Retired: PDB63 PDB68 | | |
| Leisurecat 9000 | | Boat | Australia | | | |
| ASIS Rigid Inflatable Boat | | Rigid inflatable boat | United StatesUAE | | | |
| Leisurecat Rigid Inflatable Boat | | Rigid inflatable boat | Australia | | | |
| Yamaha WaveRunner | | Jet Ski | Japan | | | |

== Firearms ==
| Model | Image | Calibre | Origin | Variant | Notes | Ref |
Pistols
| Browning HP | | 9×19mm Parabellum | Belgium | | Standard issued | |
| Smith & Wesson Model 15 | | .38 Special | United States | | | |
Submachine guns
| Heckler & Koch MP5 | | 9×19mm Parabellum | Germany | | | |
| Sterling | | 9×19mm Parabellum | United Kingdom | | | |
Assault rifles
| M16 rifle | | 5.56×45mm NATO | United States | M16A2 | Standard-issue rifle | |
| M4 Carbine | | 5.56×45mm NATO | United States | | | |
Sniper rifles
| M24/Remington 700P | | 7.62×51mm NATO/.308 Winchester | United States | | | |
| Air guns | | | | | | |
| Tranquillizer gun | | .50 caliber | | | Used on wildlife rescues | |
Grenade launchers
| Riot Gun | | 37mm projectile | United States | | Used by riot-control police | |
Bayonets
| M7 | | Spear point | United States | | The M7 bayonet fits onto the muzzle of the M16 rifle | |
