= Honda Gold Wing =

Series of touring motorcycles by Honda

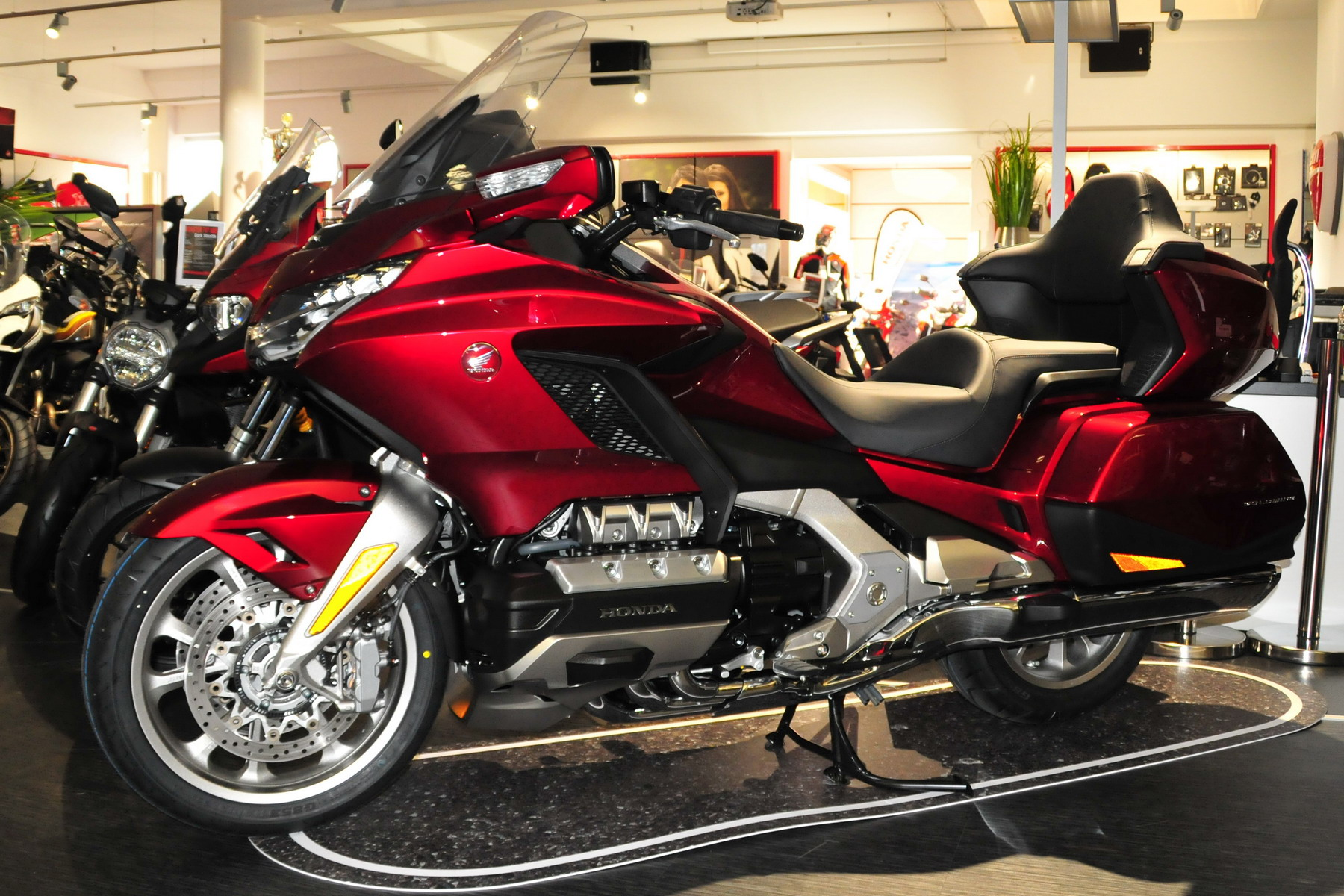
- 2018 Honda Gold Wing GL1800
- Manufacturer: Honda
- Production: 1974–present
- Assembly: Japan
- Class: Touring

The Honda Gold Wing is a series of touring motorcycles manufactured by Honda. Gold Wings feature shaft drive and a flat engine. Characterized by press in September 1974 as "The world's biggest motorcycle manufacturer's first attack on the over-750cc capacity market...", it was introduced at the Cologne Motorcycle Show in October 1974.

== The Gold Wing series ==
Total sales are more than 640,000, most of them in the U.S. market. Gold Wings were assembled in Marysville, Ohio, from 1980 until 2010, when motorcycle production there was halted. No Gold Wings were produced for the 2011 model year, and production resumed in Kumamoto Prefecture, Japan in 2011 using tooling transported from the American factory.

The Society of Automotive Engineers of Japan includes a Honda Gold Wing GL1000 manufactured in 1974 as one of their 240 Landmarks of Japanese Automotive Technology. Through 2012, Honda GL models have appeared eighteen times in the Cycle World list of Ten Best bikes.

Over the course of its production history, the Gold Wing had many design changes, beginning in 1975 with a 999 cc (61.0 cu in) flat-four engine; by 2001, this had grown to a 1,832 cc (111.8 cu in) flat-six. The 2012 model had anti-lock braking, cruise control, electrically assisted reverse gear, an optional airbag, a fairing with heating and an adjustable windscreen, panniers and a trunk, a pillion backrest, satnav, and a six-speaker radio/audio system with MP3/iPod connectivity.

== Gold Wing development ==
In 1972, following the success of the CB750 superbike, the company assembled an R&D design team to explore concepts for a new flagship motorcycle. The project leader was Shoichiro Irimajiri, who in the 1960s had designed Honda's multi-cylinder Grand Prix engines and their Formula One V12 engine.

The 1974 Gold Wing with its flat-four shaft-drive powertrain used technologies both from earlier motorcycle and automotive designs.

The Gold Wing was the first Japanese production motorcycle with a water-cooled four-stroke engine.

=== Target market ===
During its development, the CB750 was known within Honda as their "King of Motorcycles." As it would sit atop the CB750 as the top of the line Honda motorcycle, the project that would become the Gold Wing was informally called the "King of Kings." Honda first envisaged the Gold Wing as a large sport motorcycle, but on learning that customers were "piling miles on touring", Honda reconsidered the bike's design objectives, realising that the primary market for the Gold Wing was the long-distance motorcyclist. In North America a motorcycle suitable to that task would need comfort for the long haul, wind protection, a smooth ride, a comfortable seat, luggage storage, and power in abundance.

In America in the early 1970s, long-distance motorcyclists had only a few manufacturers to choose from: Harley-Davidson, Moto Guzzi and BMW. The H-D Electra Glide was a touring motorcycle with a loyal cult following. It faced strong competition from Moto Guzzi's 850cc Eldorado. BMW motorcycles were smoother and more reliable, if expensive. Other large Japanese motorcycles, such as the Honda CB750 and the Kawasaki Z1 were cheaper but were not ideal tourers with their small fuel tanks and rear drive-chains needing regular maintenance. The Gold Wing was aimed at a newly emerging market segment, namely, a new kind of American long-distance rider who was not likely to buy a Harley-Davidson or BMW but who would open their wallets for a reliable machine offering comfort, endurance, low maintenance, and a smooth, torquey, quiet engine.

The Gold Wing's secondary target market was Europe, where riders prioritised handling and performance over luxury. (The European market's special demands subsequently led to the Honda Pan European). Though other motorcycle manufacturers build touring bikes, no other touring bike has achieved the popularity of the Gold Wing.

=== M1 prototype & Project 371 ===
In 1972, the project team broke from Honda practice to produce an experimental prototype motorcycle code-named "M1". Instead of the usual transverse engine layout with a chain final drive, the M1 had a longitudinal engine suitable for shaft drive. The M1 had a 1470cc liquid-cooled flat-six engine, (twice the displacement of the CB750). Instead of seeking high performance (as some engineers had wanted), the M1 engine was designed to have a broad torque output and to produce 80 horsepower (60 kW) at 6700 rpm, with a top speed of 220 kilometres per hour (140 mph).

The brainstorming team's M1 project was never intended as a production prototype. Nonetheless, the M1 should be seen as the primordial Gold Wing because so many of its distinctive features appeared on the GL1000. The flat-six gave the M1 a low center of gravity, enhancing stability, but the extreme length of the engine/gearbox unit resulted in a cramped riding position. Instead, the project team chose to build a bike with a compact one liter flat-four engine. This bike was code-named "Project 371", and Toshio Nozue (who had worked on CB750 development) took over from Irimajiri as project leader.

== First generation ==
Gold Wing GL1000
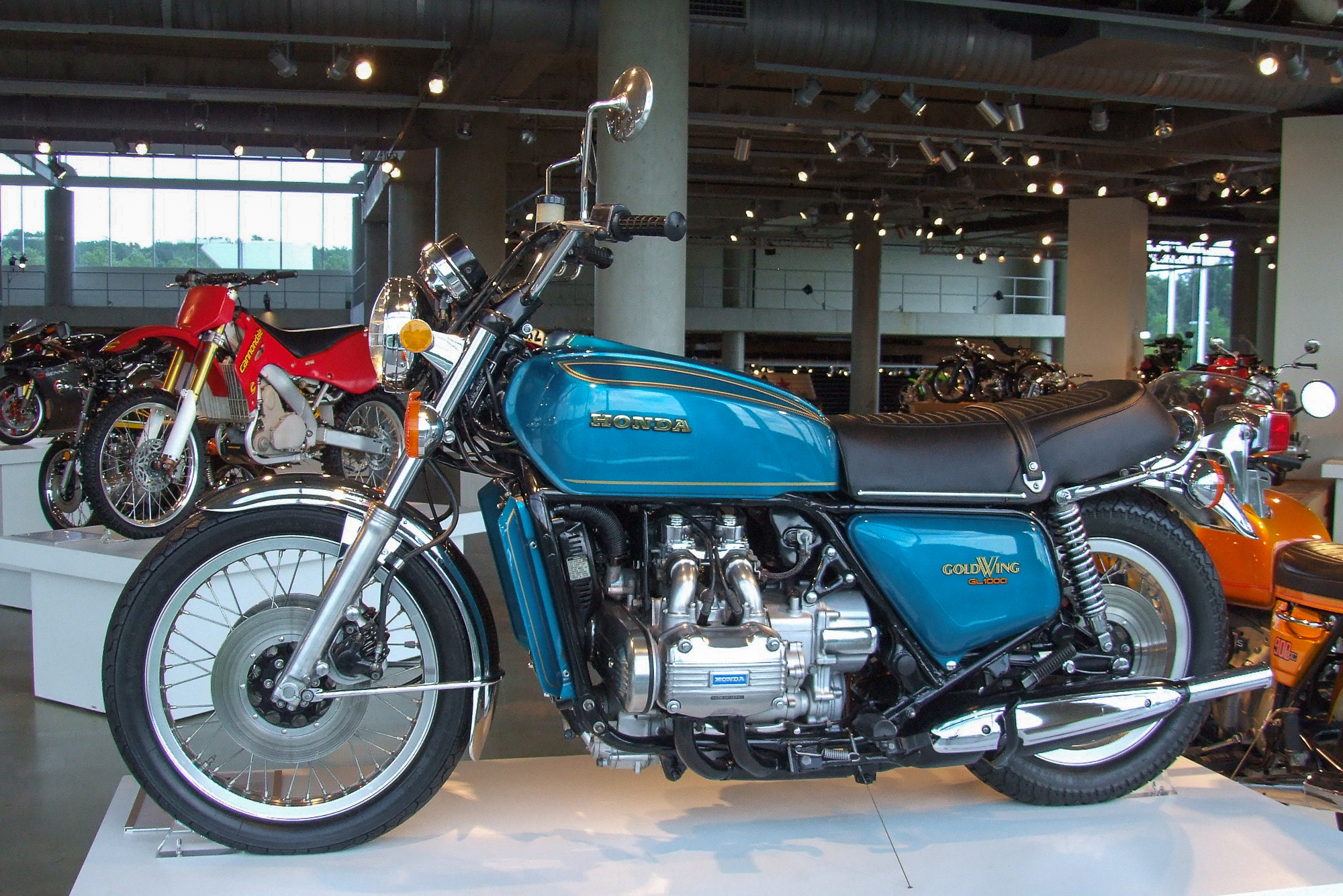
- 1975 Honda Gold Wing GL1000
- Production: 1974—1979
- Assembly: Japan
- Engine: 999 cc (61.0 cu in) SOHC flat-four
- Bore / stroke: 72.0 mm × 61.4 mm (2.83 in × 2.42 in)
- Compression ratio: 9.2:1
- Power: 80 hp (60 kW) @7500 rpm
- Ignition type: Contact breaker
- Transmission: 5-speed manual
- Frame type: Steel full-duplex cradle
- Suspension: F: Telescopic fork 143 mm (5.6 in) travel R: Swing arm, 86.3 mm (3.40 in) travel
- Brakes: F: Dual discs, single-piston calipers R: Single disc, opposed 2-piston caliper
- Tires: F: 3.50 H-19 (tube type); R: 4.50 H-17A (tube type)
- Rake, trail: 28 degrees/120 mm (4.7 in)
- Wheelbase: 60.6 in (1,540 mm)
- Dimensions: L: 2,305 mm (90.7 in)
- Seat height: 31.9 in (810 mm)
- Weight: 584 lb (265 kg) (dry)
- Fuel capacity: 19 L (4.2 imp gal; 5.0 US gal)

=== GL1000 ===
The Project 371 team finally settled on a layout that became the characteristic Gold Wing: a liquid-cooled flat-four SOHC engine, with a gear-driven generator that contra-rotated to counteract the engine's torque reaction. Cylinder blocks and crankcase were integral, with the transmission situated beneath the crankcase to keep the unit construction engine as short as possible. Final drive was by shaft.

Before going on sale in the US and in Europe in 1975, the Gold Wing was revealed to dealers in September 1974 at American Honda's annual dealer meeting in Las Vegas, and then shown to the public the following month at the IFMA (International Bicycle and Motorcycle Exhibition; today Intermot) in Cologne.

Small fairings had been mounted on two of the show models at the US dealer show in Las Vegas. These Honda-designed fairings were to be manufactured in the US by the Vetter Fairing Company and sold as Hondaline accessories; but they never went into production after the molds were accidentally destroyed. Consequently, the Gold Wing was issued naked, lacking saddlebags, a luggage rack, and a windshield. This created an opportunity for aftermarket accessory manufacturers, who soon offered a range of fairings and luggage accessories, particularly the Craig Vetter Windjammer series.

The original 999 cubic centimetres (61.0 cu in) GL1000 (designated K0) had an electric starter backed up by a kick start lever stored inside a dummy fuel tank, which also housed the radiator expansion tank, electrical components, as well as the air filter supplying four Keihin 32 mm CV carburetors. The real fuel tank was under the seat, in order to keep the center of mass as low as possible. The bike had a dry weight of 584 pounds (265 kg). 13,000 Gold Wings were sold in the United States in 1975.

There were no significant changes in the standard Gold Wing for 1976 (the K1 model). To mark the United States Bicentennial year Honda announced the GL1000 LTD with distinctive insignia and color scheme (e.g., gold stripes, gold wheels) plus some extra amenities. The LTD was a genuine limited edition with production restricted to about 2,000 units.

In the third model year (K2) Honda began refining the Gold Wing, although the changes for 1977 were small, such as exhaust pipe heat shields, revised seat and handlebar, as well as a new fuel gauge. Weight increased to 595 pounds (270 kg). The motorcycle division of Honda UK produced 52 Executive GL1000 K1 bikes by adding premium accessories to 1977 Gold Wings.

The engine was modified in 1978 for the GL1000 K3 model, in order to make more torque available at lower engine speeds; the carburetors were reduced in size by 1 mm, the exhaust system was redesigned, valve timing and ignition timing were altered. The kick-start mechanism was removed from the engine, and a reserve lighting module for the headlight and taillight (automatically switching to the second filament when one burns out) was removed from the electrics. A small instrument panel appeared on top of a restyled dummy fuel tank. Wire-spoke wheels were replaced with Honda's new ComStar wheels, but the existing tires with inner tubes remained. Dry weight grew to 601 pounds (273 kg).

1979 marked the end of GL1000 development with the K4 model (the UK version was designated KZ). Dry weight increased slightly to 604 pounds (274 kg). for the last Gold Wing to be powered by a one-liter engine. There were only minor changes for this model year, except for the ComStar wheels; new ComStars had stronger steel spokes on aluminum rims instead of the original aluminum spoked wheels that precipitated a 1979 recall (for the 1978 model year). During the final run of the GL1000 in 1979, Hondaline saddlebags and trunk were available, but Honda still did not offer a fairing.

Honda sold more than 97,000 units of the GL1000 in the United States between 1975 and 1979.

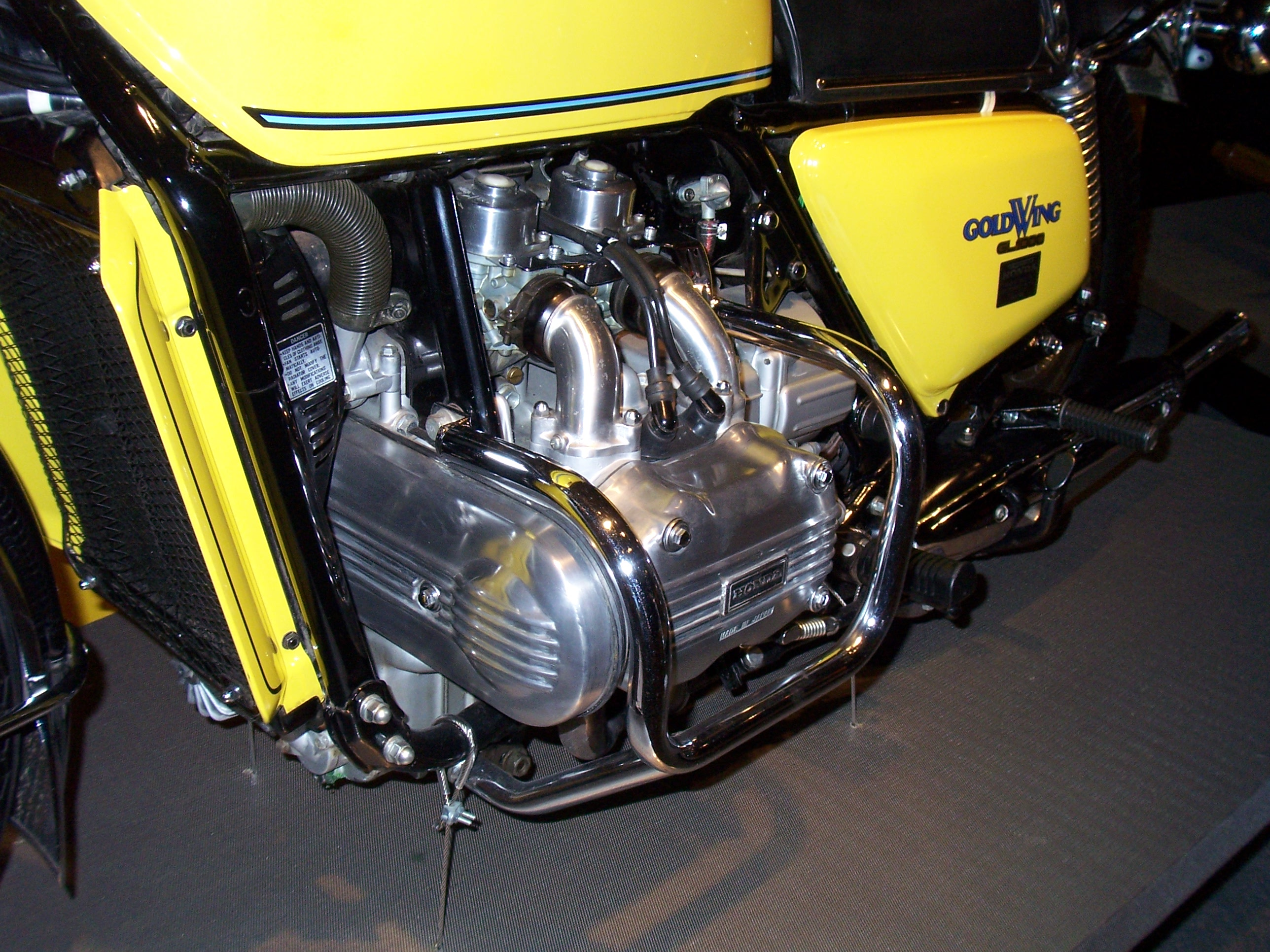
1976 GL1000 engine close up

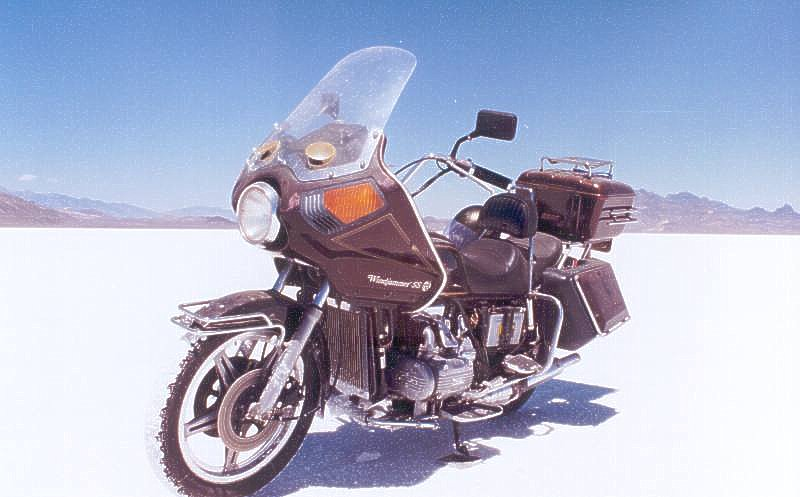
Honda Gold Wing GL1100 Full

== Second generation ==
Gold Wing GL1100
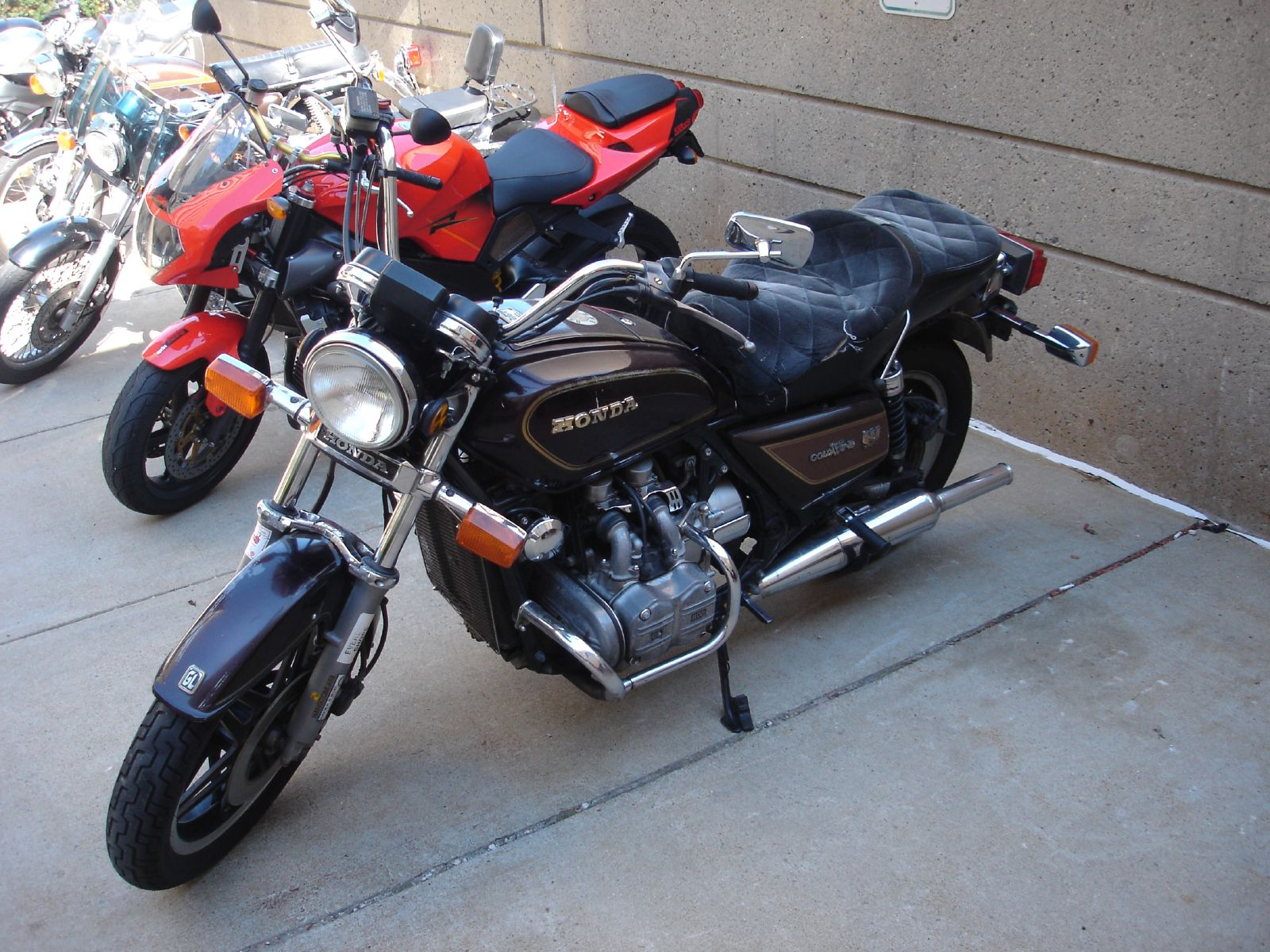
- 1980 Honda Gold Wing GL1100
- Assembly: Japan 1979–1980; Marysville, Ohio 1980– 1983
- Engine: 1,085 cc (66.2 cu in) SOHC, flat-four
- Bore / stroke: 75.0 mm × 61.4 mm (2.95 in × 2.42 in)
- Compression ratio: 9.2:1
- Power: 81 hp (60 kW) @7000 rpm
- Torque: 88 N⋅m (65 lbf⋅ft) @5500 rpm
- Ignition type: Electronic
- Transmission: 5-speed manual
- Frame type: Steel full-duplex cradle
- Suspension: F: Air-assisted telescopic fork, 148 mm (5.8 in) travel; anti-dive '82–'83; R: Air-assist shocks 80 mm (3.1 in) travel
- Brakes: F: Dual discs, 1-piston calipers '80–'81; R: Single disc, 1-piston caliper '80–'81; F: Dual discs, 2-piston calipers '82–'83; R: Single disc, 2-piston caliper '82–'83
- Tires: F: 110/90-19 62H, R: 130/90-17 68H '80–'81; F: 120/90-18 65H, R: 140/90-16 71H '82–'83
- Rake, trail: 29.17 degrees/134 mm (5.3 in) '80–'81; 29.17 degrees/132 mm (5.2 in) '82–'83
- Wheelbase: 1,605 mm (63.2 in)
- Dimensions: L: 2,340 mm (92 in) GL1100 Standard
- Seat height: 790 mm (31 in)
- Fuel capacity: 20 L (4.4 imp gal; 5.3 US gal)

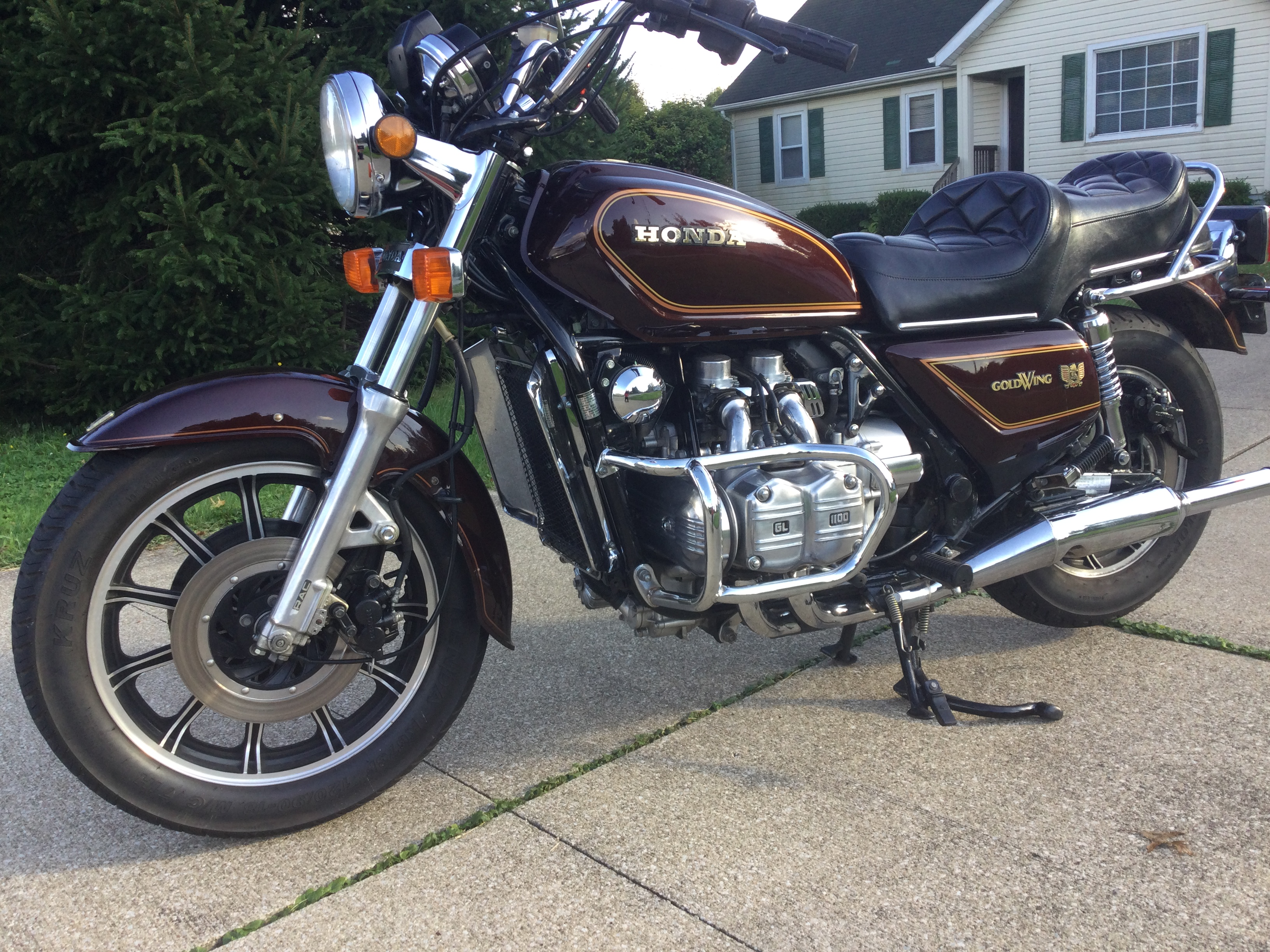
A 1983 GL1100 standard. The cast wheels replaced the comstars in 1983

=== GL1100(SC02) ===
After five years of the GL1000, the second-generation Gold Wing was released in 1979 as a 1980 model, and the GL1100 would be continued through the 1983 model year. The GL1100 was manufactured in Japan until May 1980 when Honda started assembling 1981 models at the Marysville Motorcycle Plant in Ohio, which had been making frames and parts for various models since 1974. Gold Wings would be built at a rate of 150 units a day for the years 1981–1983. Engines were still being built in Japan, but Honda began to market the machine as being made in America.

The Gold Wing faced competition from Japan in the form of the Suzuki GS1000 with an inline-four engine, and especially in the Kawasaki Z1300 that had a massive DOHC 1300cc straight-six engine with water cooling. Honda responded by increasing the displacement of the Gold Wing, and then followed-up by announcing the first Japanese full-dress tourer. The new engine was more than just a GL1000 with a 3 mm larger bore, the alterations clearly emphasized torque over horsepower. The cylinder heads were modified to improve combustion at low and middle engine speeds, transmission gear ratios were changed and the final drive ratio shortened to make more torque available at highway speeds. The bore size for all four carburetors was again reduced by 1 mm, to 30 mm.

The wheelbase was lengthened over that of the GL1000, and air suspension was added. The GL1100 had an adjustable seat, and for the first time used tubeless tires, mounted on black reverse ComStar wheels. The naked Gold Wing, which would become known as the Standard model, weighed 589 pounds (267 kg) dry. In spite of the fact that there were only minor changes to differentiate the GL1100 '81 edition from the previous year.

Ridden by Emilio Scotto, the GL1100 is the bike that toured the world. Holding the record for the longest distance of any motorcycle total distance of 457,000 miles (735,000 km).

All the 1982 Gold Wings had transmission ratios revised (again) to lower engine rpm at cruising speeds, new brakes with twin-piston calipers and wider tires on smaller wheels. Dry weight for the GL1100 '82 was 595 pounds (270 kg).

Transmission gear ratios were revised yet again for the 1983 Gold Wings to lessen engine speed on the highway. But the significant changes were not to the engine, they were to the running gear in this last year for GL1100s. Cast aluminum eleven-spoke wheels replaced the ComStars. The front suspension was endowed with TRAC anti-dive forks with an integrated fork brace, and the rear suspension worked even with no air pressure. Honda's first combined braking system, dubbed Unified Braking at the time, debuted in 1983; it engaged both front and rear brakes in unison when the brake pedal was applied. Dry weight for the standard GL1100 inched up to 599 pounds (272 kg).

=== GL1100 Interstate ===
Honda went beyond the mechanical makeover of the naked Gold Wing in March 1980 by releasing the first Japanese turn-key tourer, the Interstate model (GL1100I) with a factory-installed full fairing, saddlebags and a removable trunk, plus a long list of optional extras including a stereo system. This bike was called the De Luxe model (GL1100DX) in some markets. The fairing was designed to protect both the rider and a passenger from the wind. Likewise, the saddlebags and trunk were intended to carry the baggage of two people. This made the Interstate significantly heavier than the standard model, with a dry weight of 672 pounds (305 kg). The almost identical Interstate model was made for 1981.

The GL1100I '82 model offered more options, such as a new stereo, a 40-channel CB transceiver, and an on-board compressor to adjust the suspension air pressure. Dry weight was 679 pounds (308 kg).

The GL1100I '83 received the engine and running gear updates of the standard model; dry weight increased to 686 pounds (311 kg).

=== GL1100 Aspencade ===
Starting in 1982, Honda offered three different Gold Wing models. With the introduction of the Aspencade (GL1100A) Honda took the full-dress tourer to a new level of luxury, with a larger seat, two-tone paint and more storage compartments, together with many options from the Interstate that were being included as standard. All three brake disks on the GL1100A were internally ventilated. The additional items jacked up the dry weight to 702 pounds (318 kg).

The GL1100A '83 received the same engine and running gear updates of the other models. The Aspencade also got new front and rear brakes, with internally ventilated front discs (only), as well as a digital LCD instrument panel and some additional amenities for rider and passenger. Weight went up just a bit to 707 pounds (321 kg).

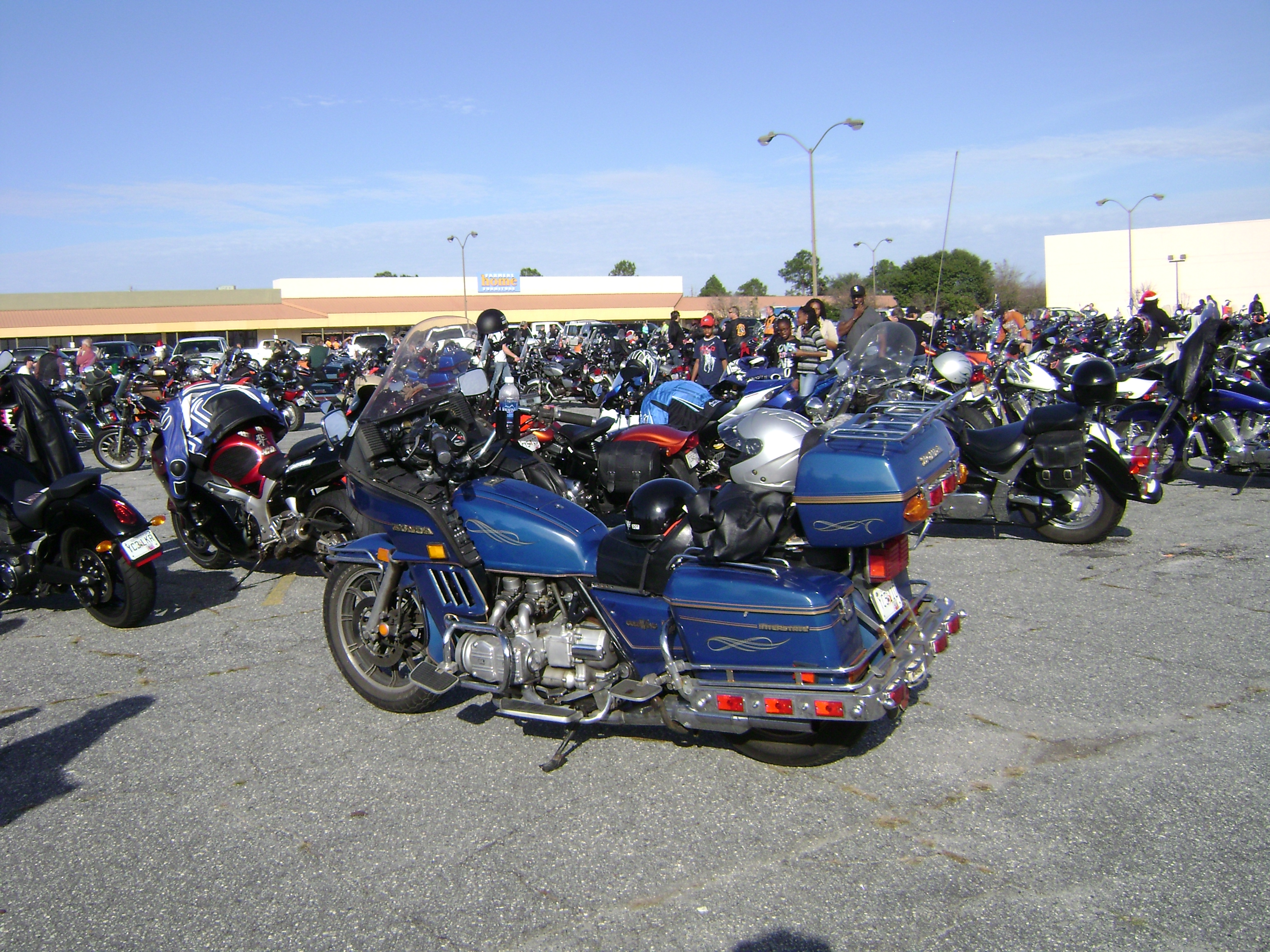
Honda GL1100 Interstate

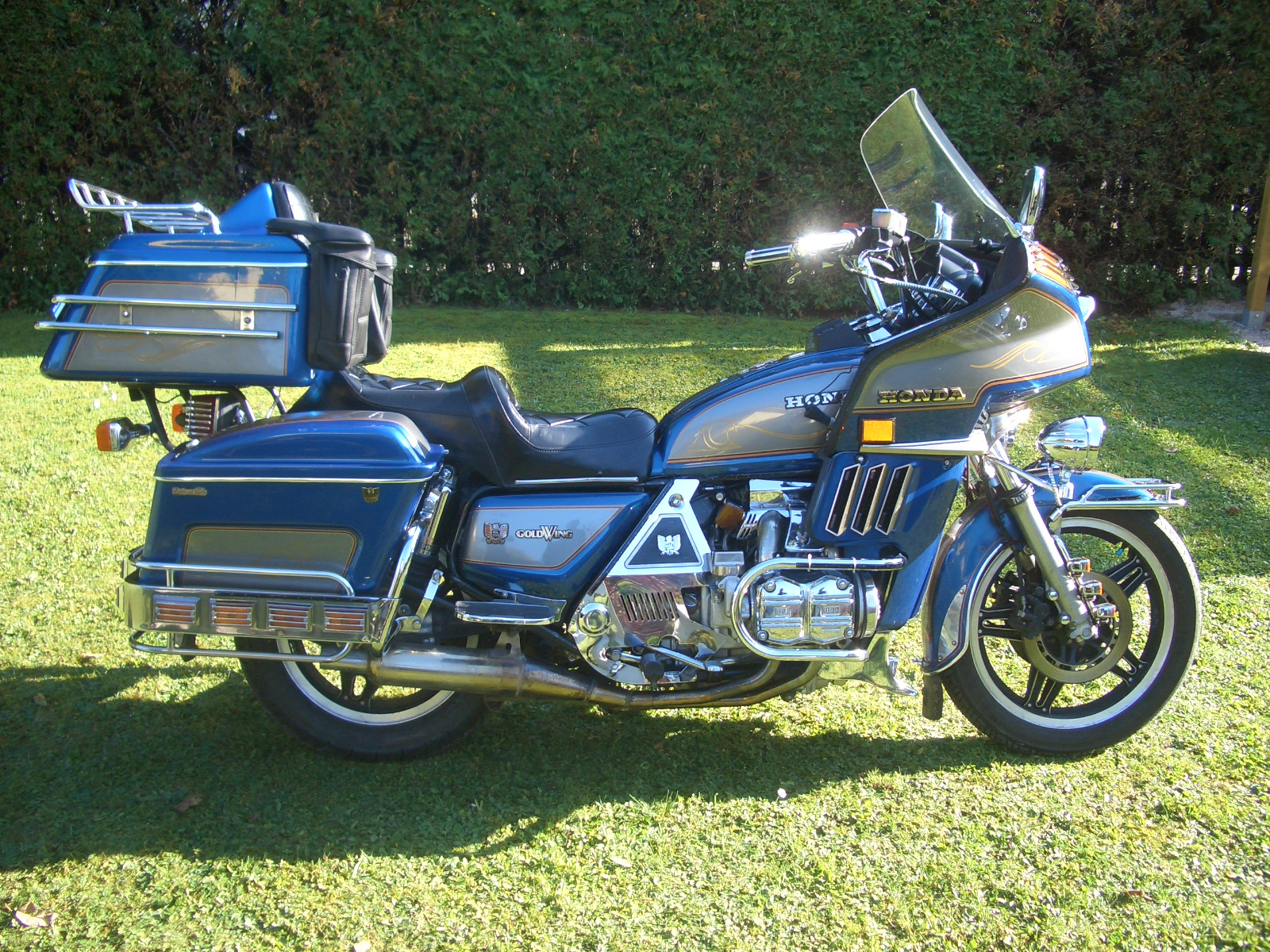
Honda Gold Wing GL1100 Full-Dresser

== Third generation ==
Gold Wing GL1200
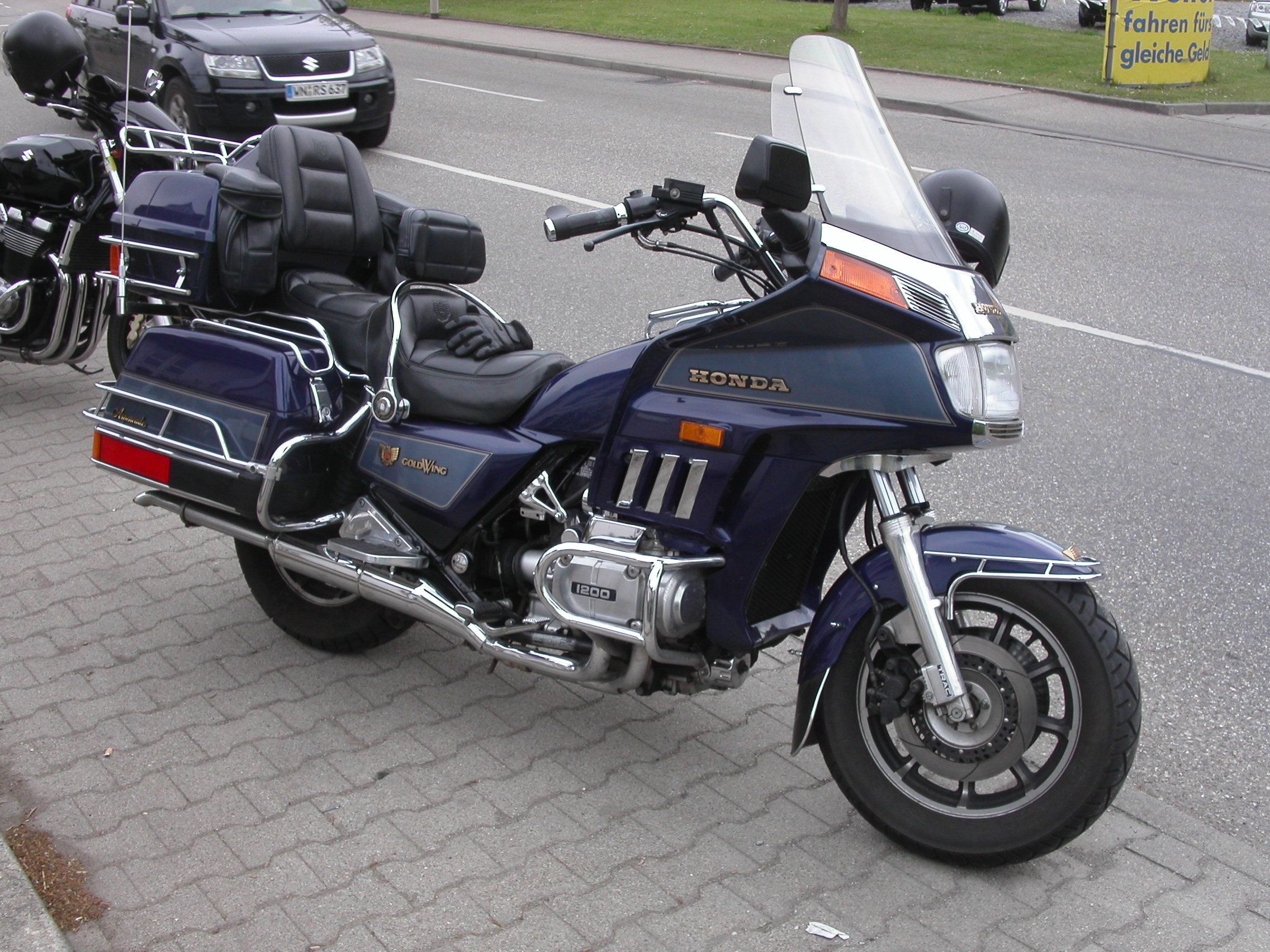
- Honda Gold Wing GL1200
- Production: 1983—1987
- Assembly: Marysville, Ohio
- Engine: 1,182 cc (72.1 cu in) SOHC, flat-four
- Bore / stroke: 75.5 mm × 66 mm (2.97 in × 2.60 in)
- Compression ratio: 9.0:1
- Ignition type: Electronic
- Transmission: 5-speed manual
- Frame type: Steel full-duplex cradle
- Suspension: F: Air-assisted, anti-dive telescopic fork, 5.5 in (140 mm) travel R:Air-assist shocks 4.1 in (100 mm) travel
- Brakes: F: Dual discs, 2-piston calipers R: Single disc, 2-piston caliper
- Tires: F: 130/90-16 67H, R: 150/90-15 74H
- Rake, trail: 30 degrees/4.6 in (120 mm)
- Wheelbase: 1,610 mm (63 in)
- Dimensions: L: 2,355 mm (92.7 in) GL1200 Standard
- Seat height: 780 mm (31 in)
- Fuel capacity: 22 L (4.8 imp gal; 5.8 US gal)

=== GL1200(SC14) ===
In 1983 Honda was facing a challenge in the marketplace from a new full-dress tourer, the Yamaha Venture XVZ 1200 with its DOHC four valve per cylinder V4 engine (as Yamaha's XS Eleven Venturer had challenged the GL1100 two years earlier). Honda hit back at the Milan motorcycle show late that year by announcing a new 1984 Gold Wing that pushed its four-cylinder engine design to its limits. The bored and stroked boxer produced more power and torque; a new final drive ratio gave the GL1200 taller gearing in order to reduce noise and vibration. The four Keihin 32 mm CV carburetors were larger than those on the GL1100 engine, on the other hand, they were the same size as the '75–'76 GL1000 carbs. Incorporating hydraulic actuation for the clutch, in addition to hydraulic tappets for the valves, made the new engine virtually maintenance-free. In order to make the Gold Wing more nimble, front and rear wheel diameters contracted (and tire widths expanded) one more time. The GL1200 was built on a new, stronger frame and despite all the improvements, the claimed dry weight of the naked bike remained unchanged at 599 pounds (272 kg) for the 1984 model year.

1984 was the one and only year for the GL1200 Standard (which was not exported to Europe) for the reason that sales had decreased in favor of the Interstate and Aspencade models. This led to the decline of aftermarket manufacturers such as the Vetter Fairing Company.

The GL1200's competitors were becoming more numerous. Last of the big Japanese manufacturers to do so, Suzuki finally entered the marketplace in 1985 with their full-dress tourer, the GV1400 Cavalcade with a DOHC, four valves per cylinder, V4 engine. In 1986 Yamaha enlarged the Venture's V4 engine to 1300cc, and Kawasaki introduced the ZG 1200 Voyager XII with a four-valve, DOHC, Inline-four engine.

=== GL1200 Interstate ===
Having introduced the full-dress Interstate with the GL1100, Honda used the GL1200I '84 to refine the Gold Wing's fairing so that it would come across as a basic part of the bike and not as an afterthought. The new model Interstate (still called De Luxe in Europe) had an automotive-style instrument panel up front and increased luggage capacity in back: 38 liters (1.3 cu ft) in each saddlebag plus another 63 liters (2.2 cu ft) in the trunk. Dry weight for the 1984 Interstate was 697 pounds (316 kg).

Despite giving the Gold Wing taller gearing the year before, in 1985 Honda shortened the overall gearing to improve performance. There were many small changes to the GL1200I '85 but atypically its price was the same as it was the previous year, and at 699 pounds (317 kg) its weight was basically stable.

The GL1200I '86 got more small updates, but the significant change was that all Gold Wing engines were being produced in Honda's Anna, Ohio plant from July 1985. Claimed dry weight for the 1986 Interstate was unchanged. The GL1200I '87 got a new seat design with three-stage foam; the weight was unchanged for 1987, the last year of the four-cylinder Gold Wing Interstate.

=== GL1200 Aspencade ===
The GL1200A '84 had all the features of the GL1200I, plus a new Panasonic audio system that combined AM/FM radio, cassette player and an intercom between the rider and passenger. Unlike the analog instruments of the Interstate, the Aspencade had a dashboard with an LCD digital display. The GL1200A also had foot boards for the passenger instead of footpegs. Claimed dry weight for the 1984 Aspencade was 723 pounds (328 kg). The price was unchanged for 1985, and the Aspencade received the same updates as the Interstate model for that year. Dry weight for the Aspencade was 728 pounds (330 kg) in both '85 and ’86.

In 1986 Dolby noise reduction was added to the audio system, which was replaced with an improved Panasonic system in 1987. In its final year, the GL1200A got the same seat upgrade as the GL1200I '87 model and some amenities that had been optional were made standard, increasing the dry weight of the Aspencade to 743 pounds (337 kg).

=== Fuel-injected models ===
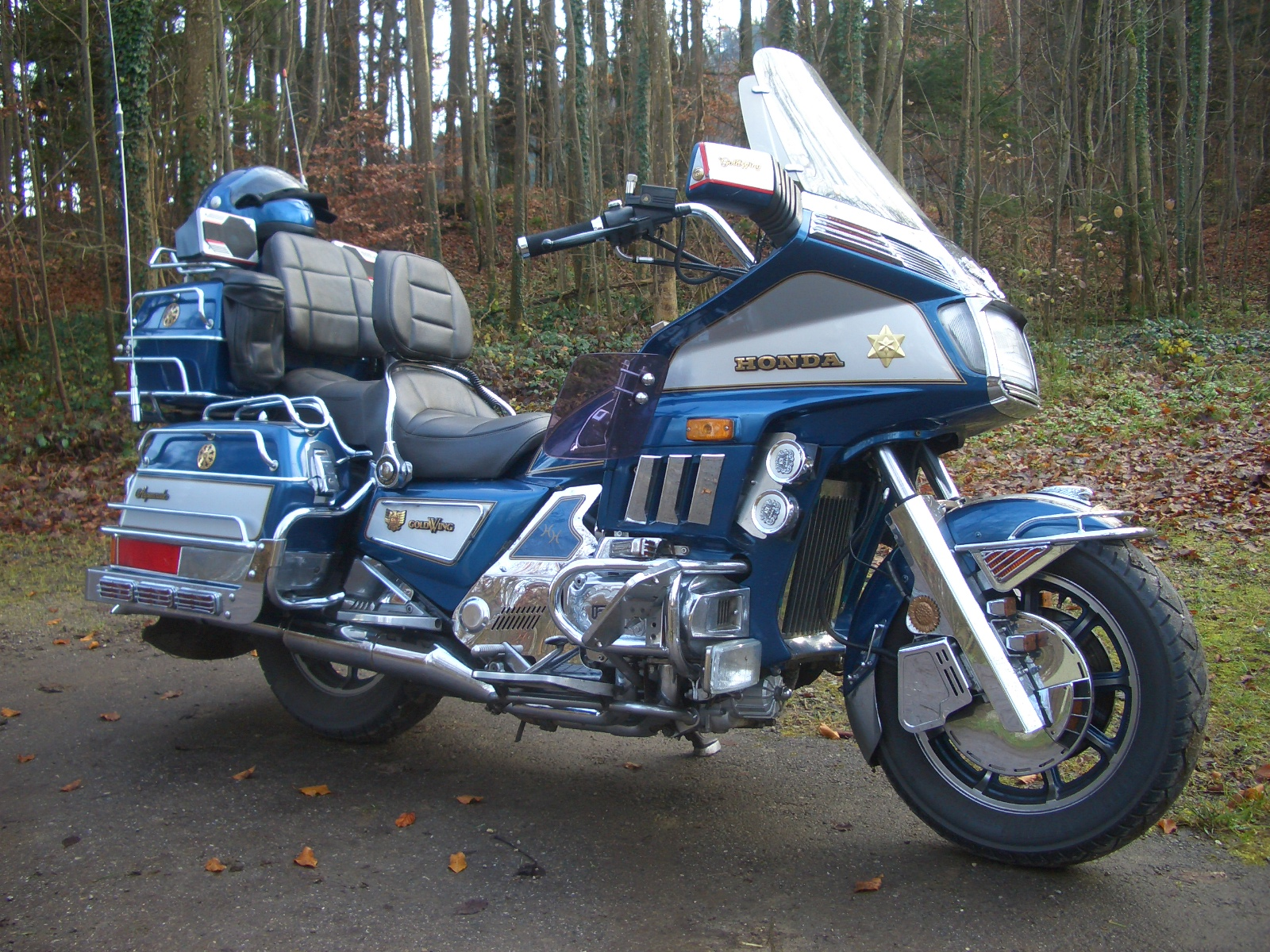
Honda Gold Wing GL1200 Full-Dresser

In 1985 Honda marked the tenth anniversary of the Gold Wing by launching a gold-painted Limited Edition model (GL1200L) luxuriously equipped with cruise control, auto-leveling rear suspension, an electronic trip computer and a four-speaker audio system. The significant development was that the GL1200L was furnished with Honda's programmed fuel injection system, previously used on the turbocharged CX500T and CX650T (variants of the GL500 and GL650 Silver Wing). Also known as the LTD, 5372 units were built and sold only in North America. Claimed dry weight for the GL1200L was 782 pounds (355 kg).

To a limited extent, the Limited Edition turned out to be a sham when the SE-i (Special Edition—injected) debuted in 1986, as essentially a repainted GL1200L. The SE-i had the same Dolby audio system as the GL1200A '86 and was only available in the US. This was the only year for the SE-i because the high cost of the fuel injection system forced Honda to return to carburetors for 1987.

== Fourth generation ==
Gold Wing GL1500
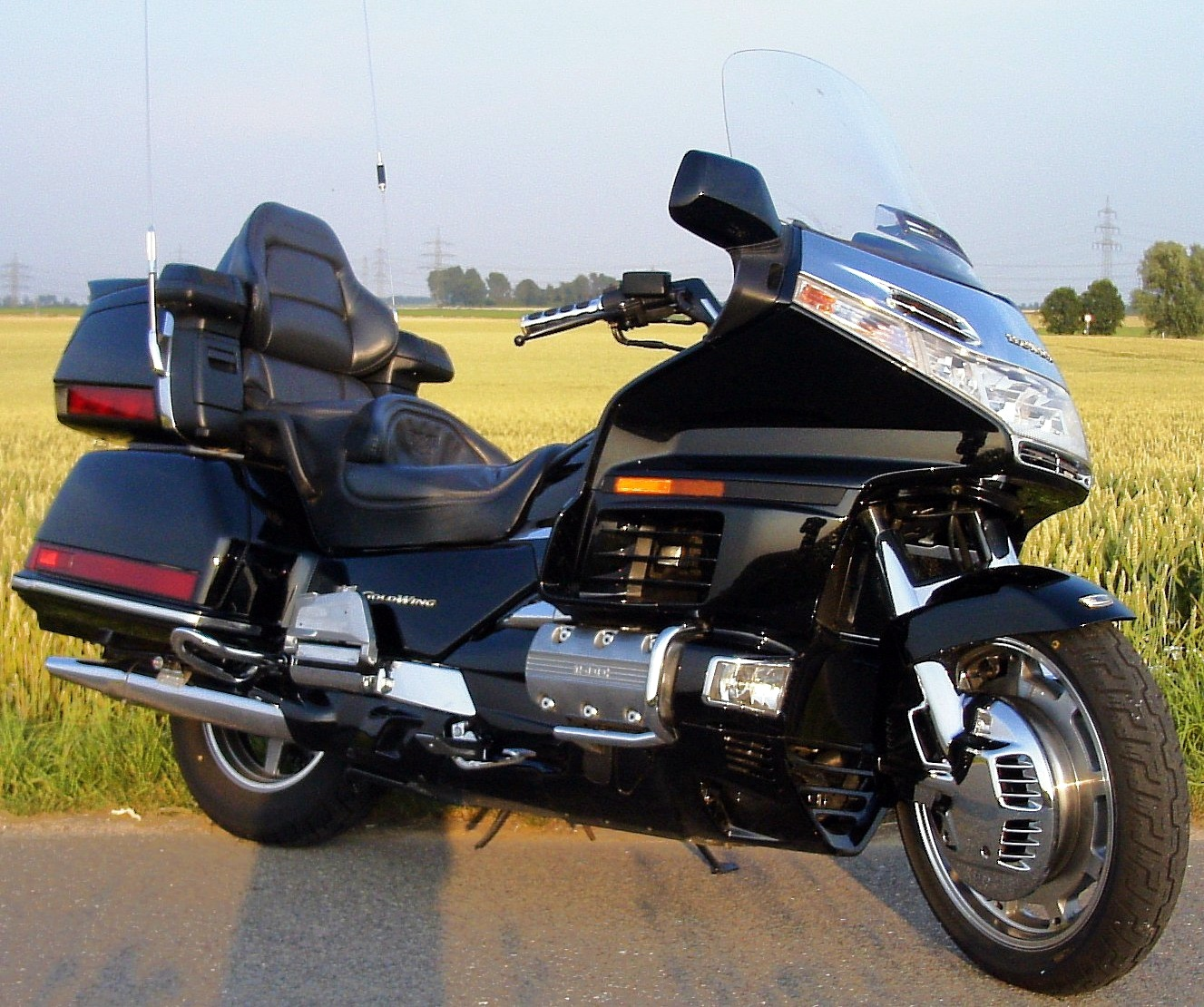
- 1998 Honda Goldwing GL1500SE
- Production: 1987—2000
- Assembly: Marysville, Ohio
- Engine: 1,520 cc (93 cu in) SOHC, flat-six
- Bore / stroke: 71 mm × 64 mm (2.8 in × 2.5 in)
- Compression ratio: 9.8:1
- Power: 75 kW (100 hp) @5200 rpm
- Torque: 150 N⋅m (110 lbf⋅ft) @ 4000 rpm
- Ignition type: Electronic Solid-state Digital
- Transmission: 5-speed manual; electric reverse
- Frame type: Steel full-duplex cradle
- Suspension: F: Anti-dive fork 5.5 in (140 mm) travel R: Air-assisted shocks, 4.1 in (100 mm) travel
- Brakes: F: Dual discs, 2-piston calipers R: Single disc, 2-piston caliper
- Tires: F: 130/70-18 63H, R: 160/80-16 75H
- Rake, trail: 30 degrees/111 mm (4.4 in)
- Wheelbase: 1,690 mm (67 in)
- Dimensions: L: 2,630 mm (104 in) GL1500
- Seat height: 30.3–29.1 in (770–740 mm)
- Fuel capacity: 23 L (5.1 imp gal; 6.1 US gal)

With three versions of the Gold Wing boxer motor spanning a dozen years, by 1987 further development of the flat-four engine was regarded as being constrained by the law of diminishing returns. Piston displacement had been increased twice to generate more torque, but this also made each power stroke more intense. During the same time period, gear ratios had been raised to decrease engine RPM (boosting fuel economy and reducing vibration as well as noise levels) which in turn made pulses through the drivetrain seem rougher to the rider because firing intervals were farther apart. The obvious way to deliver power more smoothly (as Irimajiri-san had demonstrated with the M1 engine) was to step up from four cylinders to six.

=== GL1500(SC22) ===
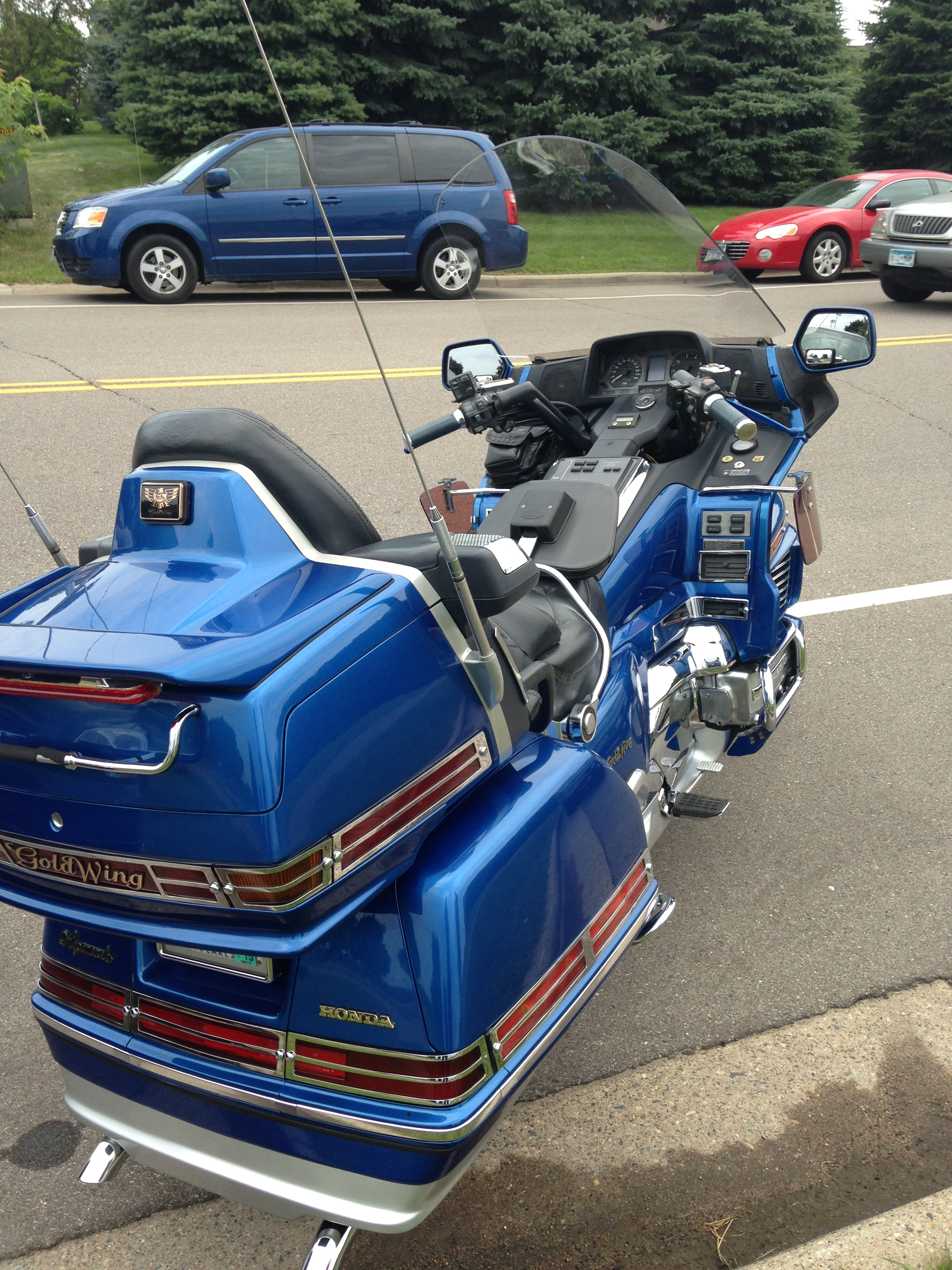
GL1500 with the dashboard visible

A new design team began work on the fourth-generation Gold Wing in 1984. Honda describes prototype testing as involving sixty developmental stages, and building fifteen different test bikes, including one made from a GL1200 frame coupled with the original M1 engine so that a six-cylinder could be compared to a four-cylinder head-on. This early '70s prototype had an influence far beyond what the M1's initial designers could have expected.

New Gold Wing engine design goals were smoothness, quietness and enormous power. Ultimately, a redesigned Gold Wing made its debut at the 1987 Cologne Motorcycle Show, 13 years after the original GL1000 was first shown to the public at the same venue, and the GL1500 brought the most changes seen to the Gold Wing series since its inception. The biggest difference was that the flat-four engine was replaced with a flat-six engine. Although the GL1500 still used carburetors, there were just two large 36 mm CV Keihins supplying all six cylinders, the first time any Gold Wing had less than one carb per cylinder.

Honda also enclosed the entire motorcycle in plastic, giving it a seamless appearance. The seat height was lowest yet on a Gold Wing, the passenger back rest and trunk were integrated, and a central mechanism locked the trunk lid and saddlebags. Rear suspension air pressure was adjusted by an on-board compressor. One major innovation was the addition of a "reverse gear", which was actually a creative use of the electric starter motor linked to the transmission. Because of the size and weight, Honda felt that some people would have problems backing it up.

The new Gold Wing had grown in nearly every dimension. A larger windshield, longer wheelbase, two more cylinders, more horsepower, more bodywork, more electronics, more accessories and more mass: 794 pounds (360 kg) dry. Options include a passenger audio control and rear speakers, CB radio, auxiliary lights and exterior trim. In another first for the GL1500, 1988 was the year Honda exported Gold Wings from the US to Japan for the first time.

For 1989 Honda modified the brake discs, and raised the price. Brake discs were modified again in 1990, as were the carbs and camshafts, without a price increase. The claimed GL1500 dry weight for '90 was 798 pounds (362 kg). In addition, a Gold Wing 15th Anniversary Special Edition model (GL1500SE) made its debut in 1990.

The following year, to celebrate the 10th anniversary of American-made Gold Wings, every bike produced for 1991 came with a numbered plaque and anniversary edition insignia. There were three '91 models: Aspencade indicated the regular GL1500 model; the luxurious Special Edition from the year before carried on as the SE model; and the Interstate name denoted a stripped-down model.

=== GL1500 Aspencade ===
When the Honda of America Manufacturing (HAM) plant in Marysville, Ohio produced its 500,000th vehicle in 1991, it was a Gold Wing Aspencade. The claimed dry weight for the GL1500A '91 was 800 pounds (360 kg). Honda began offering extra cost paint options, and Honda Canada inaugurated Canadian Edition Gold Wings in '92.

Beginning in 1993, all GL1500 rocker arms pivoted on needle bearings, and the cruise control was updated to directly read crankshaft speed for enhanced precision. 1994 was the seventh year of GL1500 production (longer than any of its forerunners) and nothing significant changed except the asking price.

1995 was the 20th anniversary of the Gold Wing. American Honda published a special hard-cover book Vreeke, Ken (1994). Gold Wing: The First 20 Years (Twentieth Anniversary ed.). American Honda Motor Company, Incorporated. ISBN 0964249103. All 1995 models got commemorative emblems, cosmetic changes, a thinner and narrower seat and suspension improvements which reduced ground clearance, contributing to an even lower seat height (offsetting the weight gain). The GL1500A was at its heaviest in '95; the claimed dry weight would stay at 802 pounds (364 kg) until the end of this model.

The 1996 Aspencade received an upmarket audio system that had been exclusive to the GL1500SE. Yet another milestone was reached in mid-1996 when a Gold Wing Aspencade was the millionth Honda motorcycle made in America to roll off the assembly line at the Marysville Motorcycle Plant. The GL1500 family got bigger when Honda created the first GL1500C Valkyrie in May 1996 (for the 1997 model year). The Valkyrie was the first naked GL since 1984.

1997 GL1500s received engine, transmission and final drive improvements first introduced on the GL1500C. A 1998 Gold Wing styling makeover extended to the engine with redesigned valve covers, but no price increase. Honda commemorated 50 years in America by adding 50th Anniversary emblems to all 1999 Gold Wings; the GL1500A '99 price increased. The 2000 Gold Wings had chrome-plated valve covers, Canadian and American models also had gold-plated 25th Anniversary emblems marking 25 years since the first GL1000 debuted for the 1975 model year.

The 2000 model was the last GL1500 Aspencade model. A complete redesign of the Marysville Motorcycle Plant began In January 2000 to build the next Gold Wing, and stories soon came out in the motorcycle press that the Gold Wing itself was being redesigned. The GL1500 had been in production for 13 model years, which was as long as all of the four-cylinder Gold Wings combined; moreover, GL1500 engine continued to be used in the Valkyrie through the 2003 model year.

=== GL1500 SE ===
The original 15th Anniversary Special Edition model had a vented windshield, additional lights, upgraded sound system, two-tone paint with special insignia, adjustable passenger floorboards and adjustable foot pegs as well as foot heaters for the rider. In 1990 It had a weight of 807 pounds (366 kg) dry. The GL1500SE '91 was essentially unchanged, though weight and price were up a bit at 809 pounds (367 kg).

Hitherto optional rear speakers and CB radio became standard on the GL1500SE '93; boosting both its weight—813 pounds (369 kg).

The GL1500SE '97 had powertrain updates. Honda marked its 50th anniversary in 1999 without a GL1500SE price increase, and the American-made GL1500SE '99 that was exported to Japan got a two-tone paint job. More significantly, the export model got an exhaust air-injection system along with carburetor modifications in order to pass Japan's new emission regulations.

The 25th Anniversary GL1500SE in 2000 had a claimed dry weight from 1995 to 2000 was 816 pounds (370 kg).

=== GL1500 Interstate ===
The GL1500I '91 model had its weight and price cut by eliminating the reverse gear, cruise-control, the passenger footboards, and by replacing the audio system with a small Kenwood radio. The seat was lowered by 0.8 inches (20 mm). Claimed dry weight for the 1991 Interstate was 760 pounds (340 kg). In 1992 the Kenwood radio was, in turn, replaced by a new Panasonic 25-watt-per-channel sound system with intercom. Weight for the GL1500I '92 rose slightly to 767 pounds (348 kg).

As with the other 20th Anniversary models, the cost of a GL1500I '95 jumped. The last GL1500I was the 1996 model. Claimed dry weight for '95 and '96 was 769 pounds (349 kg). The Interstate model was discontinued, replaced in 1997 by the Valkyrie Tourer (GL1500CT) as well as the 1999 Valkyrie Interstate (GL1500CF).

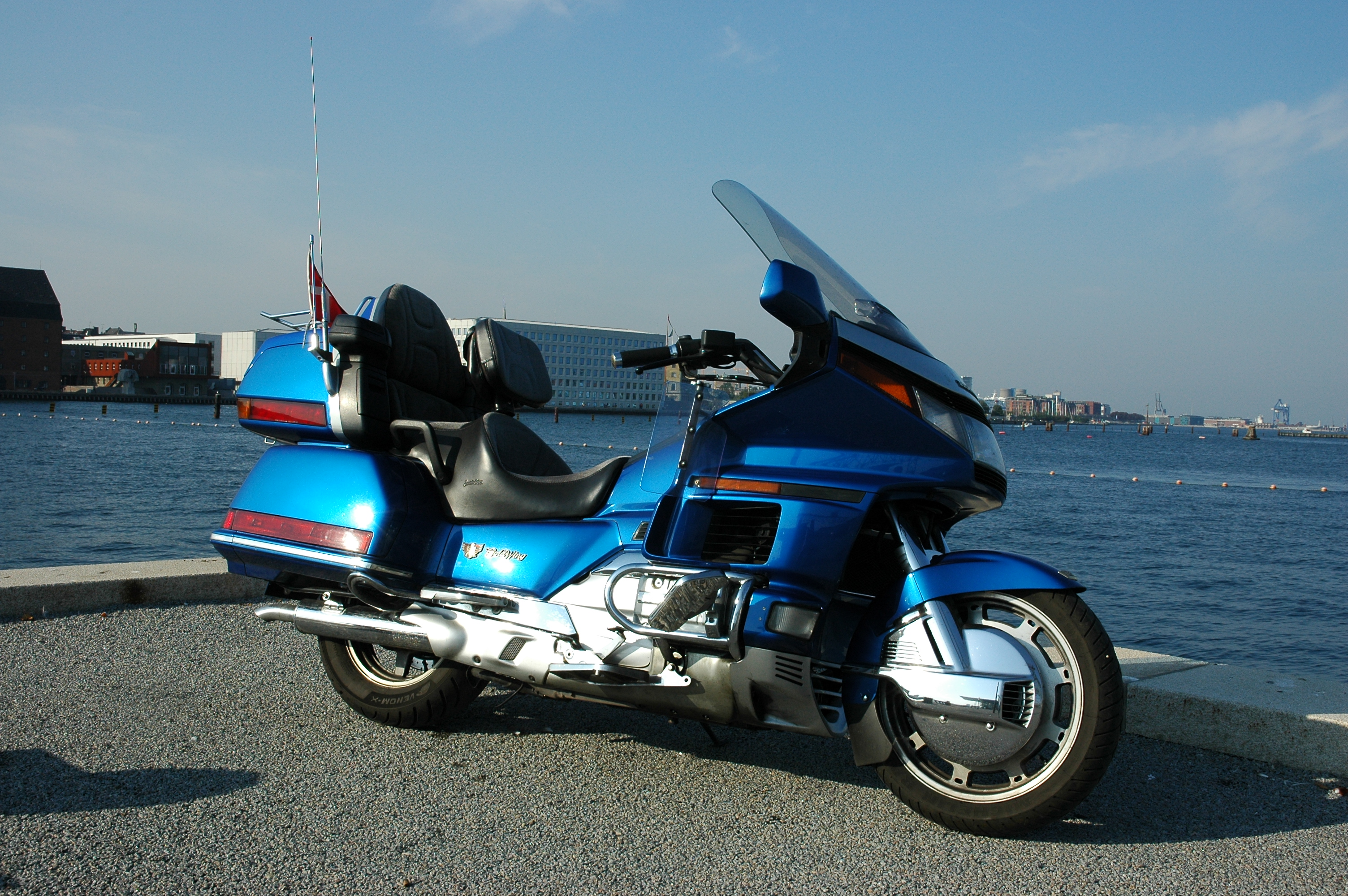
1992 Gold Wing GL1500 Aspencade

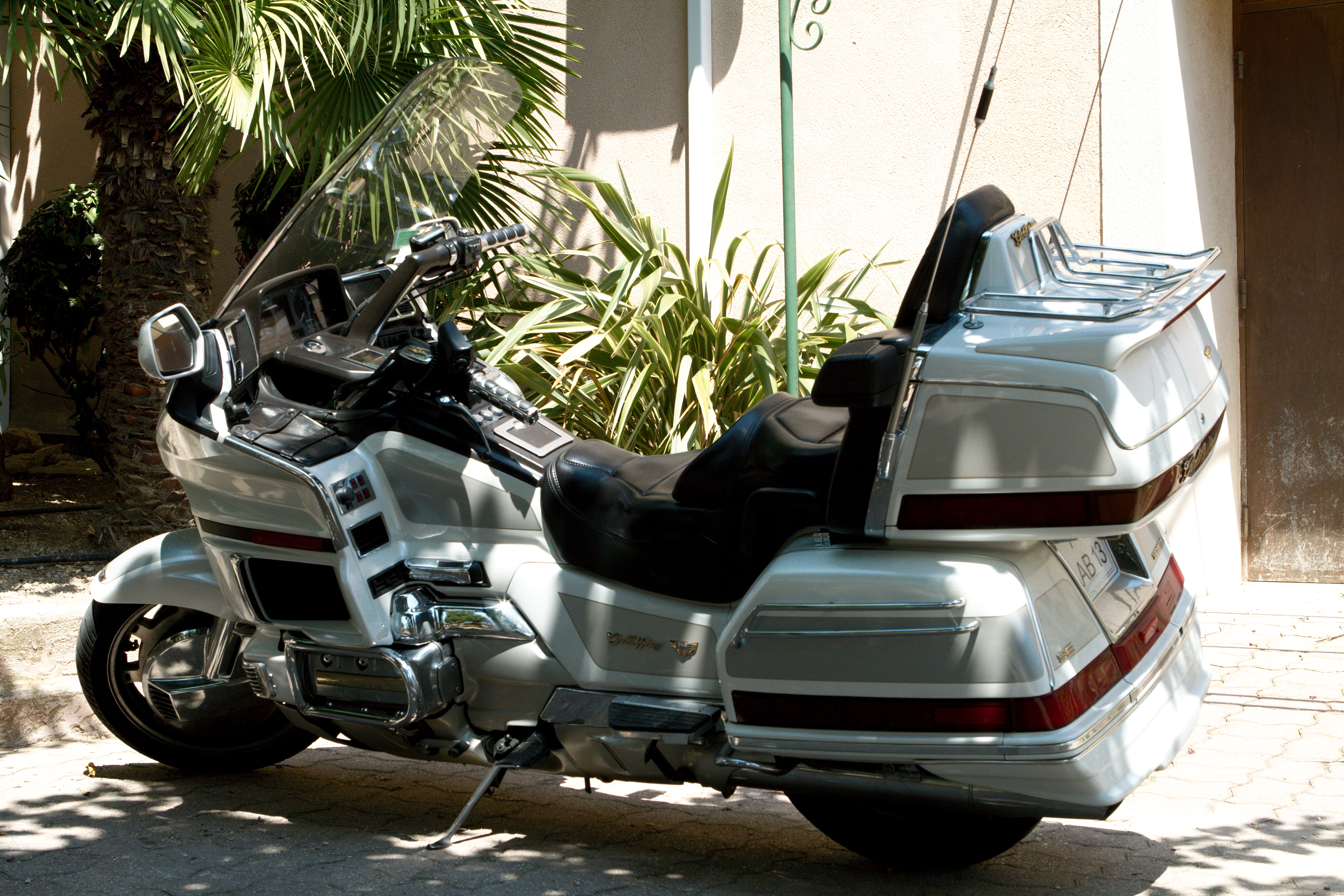
Honda Gold Wing GL1500SE

== Fifth generation ==
Honda Gold Wing GL1800
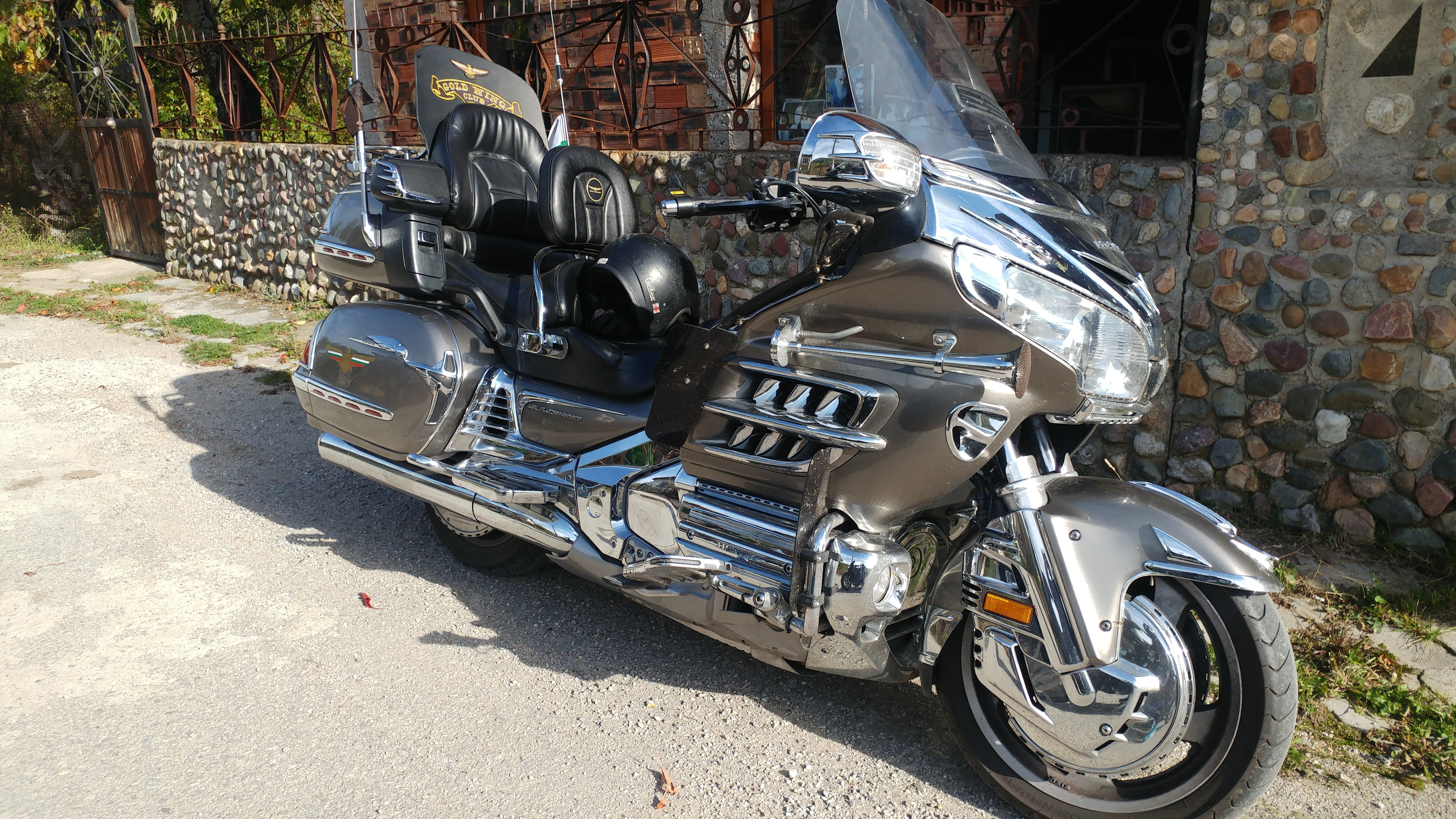
- Honda Gold Wing GL1800
- Manufacturer: Honda Motor Co., Ltd
- Also called: GL1800A (with ABS)
- Production: 2001–2017
- Assembly: Marysville, Ohio USA (2000—2009); Kikuchi, Kumamoto Japan (2011—2017)
- Predecessor: GL1000, GL1100, GL1200, GL1500
- Class: Touring
- Engine: 1,832 cc (111.8 cu in) water-cooled flat-six, SOHC, 2 valves per cylinder; with PGM-FI
- Bore / stroke: 74 mm × 71 mm (2.9 in × 2.8 in)
- Compression ratio: 9.8:1
- Power: 88 kW (118 hp)
- Torque: 167 N⋅m (123 lbf⋅ft)
- Ignition type: Electronic
- Transmission: 5-speed manual, plus electric reverse
- Frame type: Diamond multi box-section aluminum alloy
- Suspension: F: 45mm cartridge fork with anti-dive system, 140 mm (5.5 in) travel R: Single-sided swing arm with electronically controlled preload, 105 mm (4.1 in) travel
- Brakes: F: Dual discs, 3-piston calipers R: Single disc, 3-piston caliper
- Tires: F: 130/70R-18 63H, R: 180/60R-16 74H
- Rake, trail: 29.25 degrees/109 mm (4.3 in)
- Wheelbase: 1,692 mm (66.6 in)
- Dimensions: L: 2,635 mm (103.7 in); W: 945 mm (37.2 in); H: 1,455 mm (57.3 in)
- Seat height: 29.1 in (740 mm)
- Weight: 799 lb (362 kg) GL1800A (dry); 858 lb (389 kg) (fuel tank empty); 898 lb (407 kg) (wet)
- Fuel capacity: 25 L (5.5 imp gal; 6.6 US gal)
- Fuel consumption: 30 mpg_{‑US} (13 km/L; 36 mpg_{‑imp}) (low); 40 mpg_{‑US} (17 km/L; 48 mpg_{‑imp}) (high); 36 mpg_{‑US} (15 km/L; 43 mpg_{‑imp}) (avg)
- Related: Valkyrie Rune; Valkyrie (F6C); F6B

=== GL1800(SC47) ===
The first new model for 13 years, the 2001 GL1800 had a larger 1,832 cc (111.8 cu in) engine with fuel injection, and a power increase from 74 kW (99 bhp) to 87 kW (117 bhp). The GL1800's extruded aluminium frame, comprising 31 elements (barely half the GL1500's number) resulted in an overall weight decrease. Options included ABS braking.

The 2006 model had further options: an airbag, in-dash GPS called Internavi, with audio information provided through the speakers and headset cables, plus a rider "comfort package" comprising saddle heating, heated grips, and adjustable engine-air vents ahead of the driver's foot pegs.

=== Update(SC68) ===
The 2010 model year was the last to be produced in the United States, and no 2011 model year Gold Wings were produced while manufacturing was transferred to Japan in 2012. Some retailers and aftermarket traders group all GL1800 models into two categories: US made GL1800s (2001–2010) are "1st Generation", and Japanese-built GL1800's (2012–2017) are "2nd Generation".

2nd Gen GL1800 had minor updates: restyled bodywork made the fairing and saddlebags seem less bulbous, despite being more capacious. A revised fairing gave better protection to the rider's legs, with vents channelling warm engine air onto the rider's feet. The trunk, fairing pockets and saddlebags gave a storage capacity of 150 litres (5.3 cu ft). The instrument display has a brighter screen, an updated satellite navigation / radio, and a revised six-speaker audio system with MP3 and iPod connectivity.

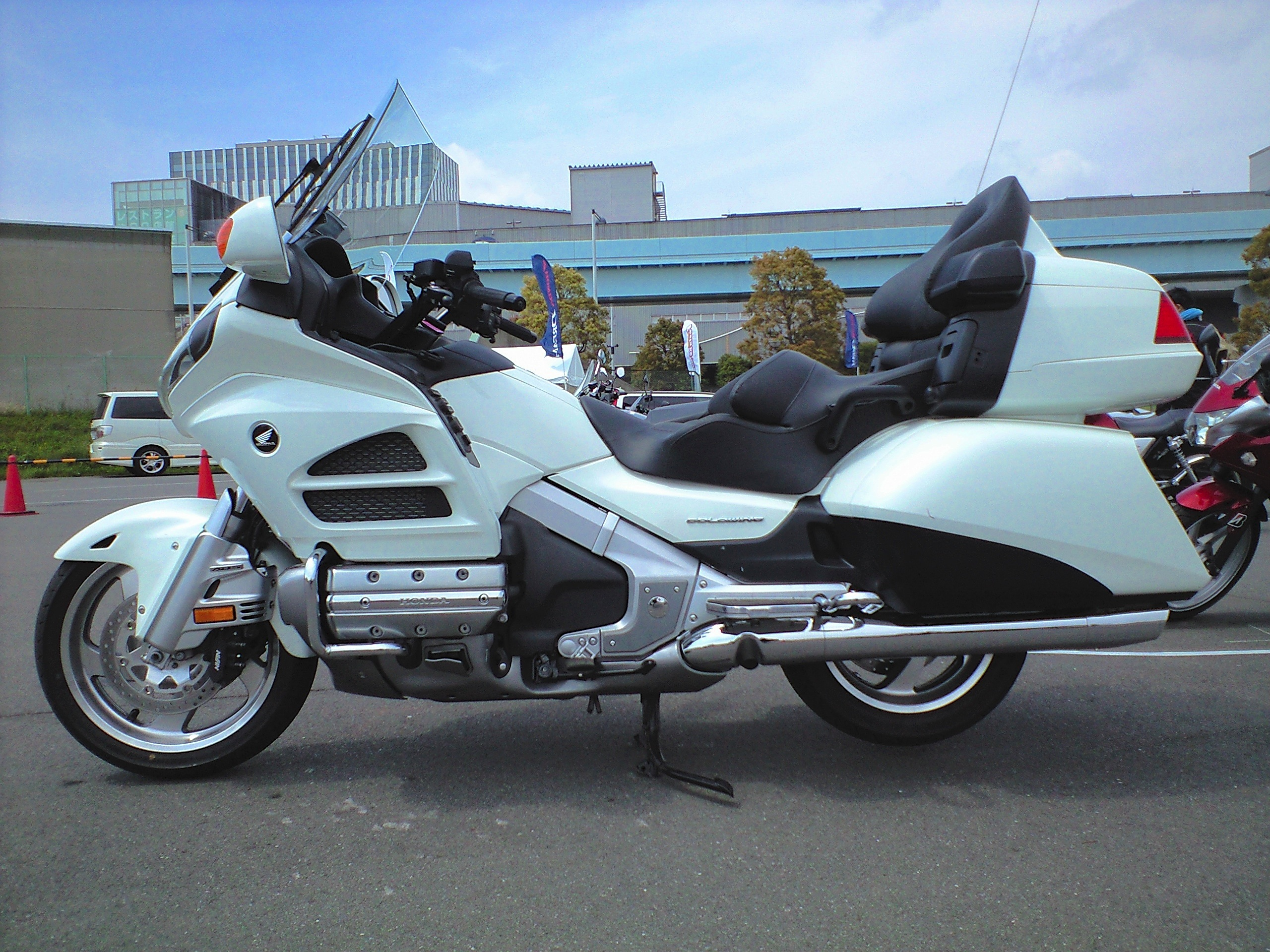
2012 Gold Wing GL1800 model for Japanese market, with windshield wiper

== Sixth generation ==
Honda Gold Wing GL1800
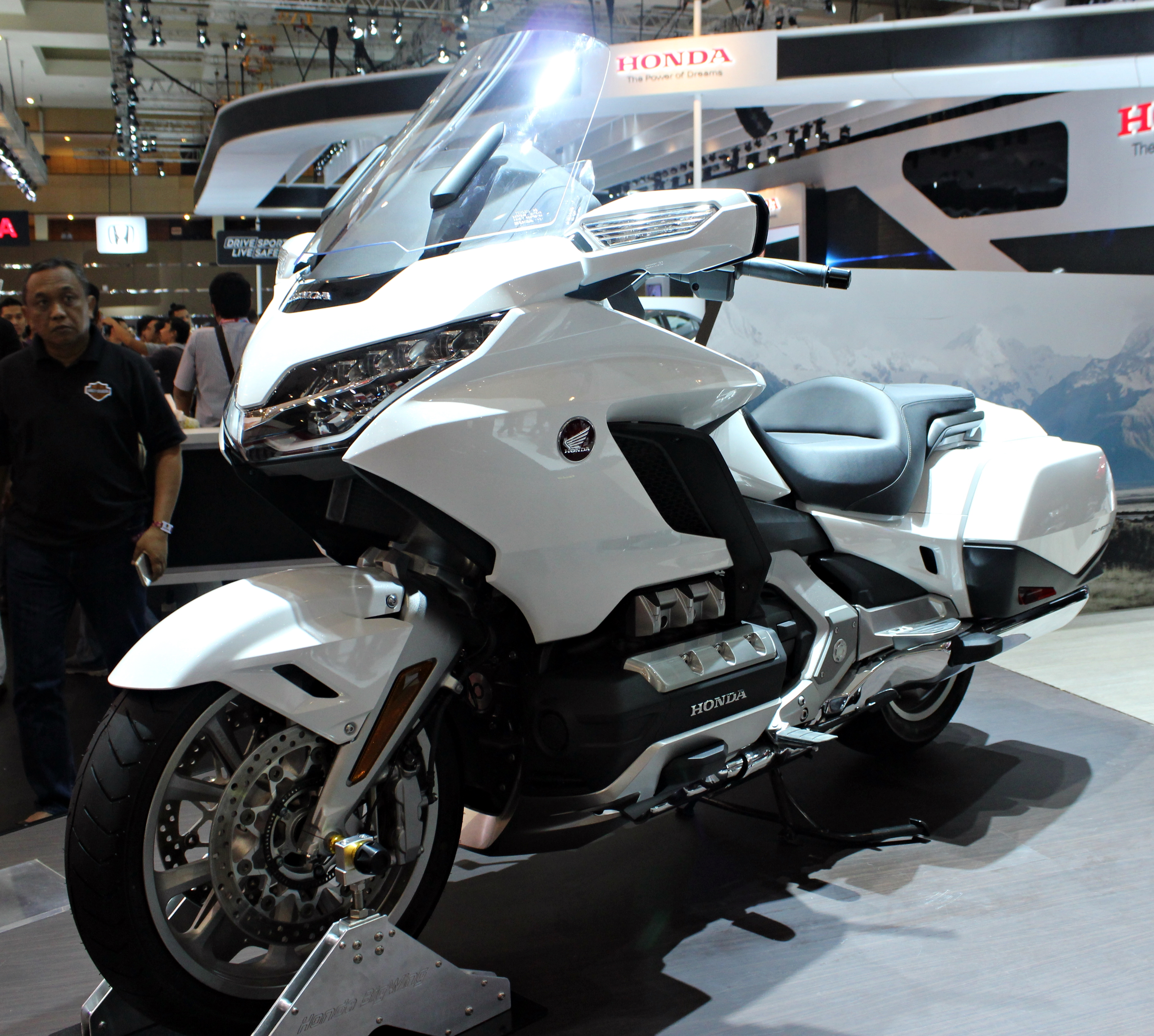
- 2018 Honda Gold Wing GL1800
- Manufacturer: Honda Motor Co., Ltd
- Production: 2018–present
- Assembly: Kumamoto, Japan
- Class: Touring
- Engine: 1,833 cc (111.9 cu in) water-cooled flat-six, SOHC, 4 valves per cylinder; with PGM-FI
- Bore / stroke: 73 mm × 73 mm (2.9 in × 2.9 in)
- Compression ratio: 9.8:1
- Power: 93 kW (125 hp) at 5,500rpm
- Torque: 170 N⋅m (130 lbf⋅ft) at 4,500rpm
- Transmission: 6-speed manual, plus electric reverse 7-speed dual-clutch transmission, plus electric reverse
- Frame type: Aluminium die cast, twin tube
- Suspension: F: Double wishbone R: Pro-link
- Brakes: F: Dual discs, 6-piston calipers R: Single disc, 3-piston caliper
- Tires: F: 130/70R-18 63H; R: 200/55R-16 74H
- Rake, trail: 30.5 degrees/109 mm (4.3 in)
- Wheelbase: 1,695 mm (66.7 in)
- Dimensions: L: 2,475 mm (97.4 in); 2,575 mm (101.4 in)(Tour); W: 925 mm (36.4 in)(MT); 905 mm (35.6 in)(DCT); H: 1,340 mm (53 in); 1,430 mm (56 in)(Tour)
- Seat height: 745 mm (29.3 in)
- Weight: 365 kg (805 lb) MT; 364 kg (802 lb) DCT; 380 kg (840 lb) Tour MT; 383 kg (844 lb) Tour DCT w/ airbag (wet)
- Fuel capacity: 21.1 L (4.6 imp gal; 5.6 US gal)
- Oil capacity: 4.4 L (0.97 imp gal; 1.2 US gal) MT; 5.6 L (1.2 imp gal; 1.5 US gal) DCT
- Fuel consumption: 5.6 L/100 km (50 mpg_{‑imp})
- Turning radius: 3.4 m (11 ft)

=== 2018 GL1800(SC79) ===
For its sixth generation, in 2018, Honda produced a completely redesigned Gold Wing. The new model has a new four-valve engine and is available in two versions: the standard Gold Wing (replacing F6B bagger) and the "top trunk" Gold Wing Tour. Sportier in appearance, technologically more advanced, and more compact, the 2018 Gold Wing is 41 kg (90 lb) lighter than before. Its new robotically welded frame has a double wishbone front suspension, resembling the Duolever from BMW. New features include throttle by wire, four ride modes, traction control, LED lighting, hill start assist, Apple CarPlay, and (on the Tour model) electronically adjustable suspension. Options include automatic dual clutch transmission with a forward and reverse "walking mode".

In mid-June 2020, Honda introduced Android Auto. For 2021, Honda increased the size of the top trunk from 50 litres to 61 litres. The passenger's back seat rest features a more relaxed angle with thicker foam and taller profile. Speakers were changed to 45 watt with automatic volume adjustment and standard XM radio. Rear turn signals were changed to all red.

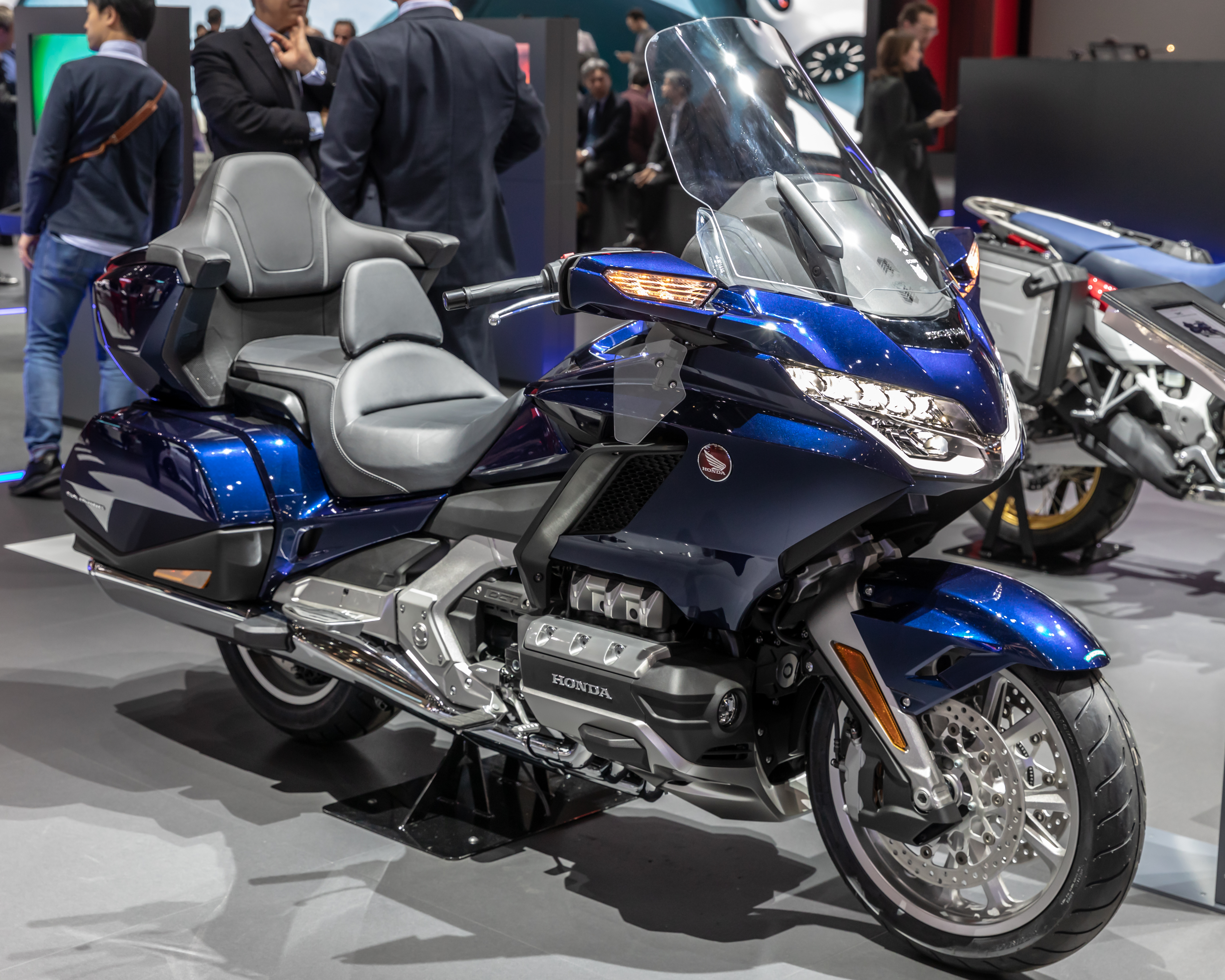
2018 Honda Gold Wing Tour

== F6C "Valkyrie" ==
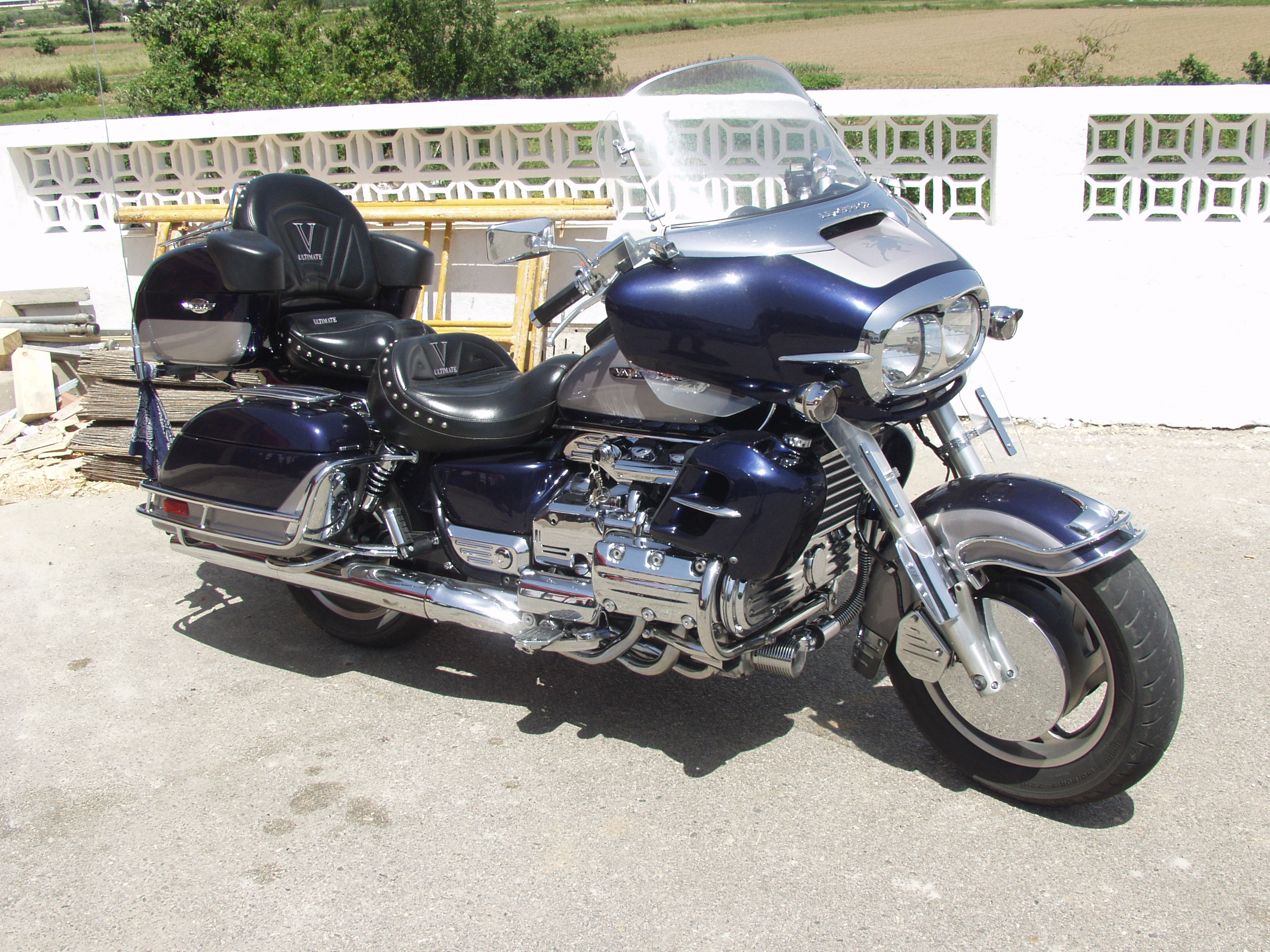
2000 Valkyrie Interstate in Portugal

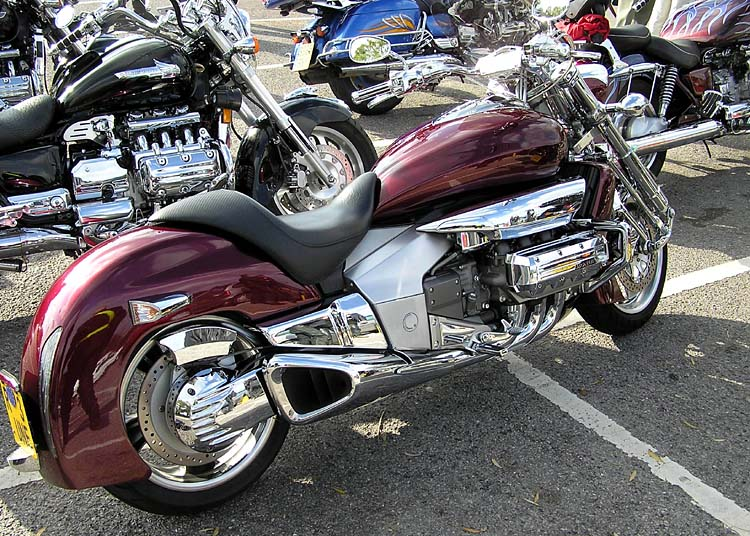
"Limited Edition" Valkyrie Rune

In 1997 Honda brought back an incarnation of the "Standard" or "classic" Gold Wing, renamed the Valkyrie in the US, and called F6C in the rest of the world. It had a higher performance engine, based on the GL1500, in a cruiser-style frame. The Valkyrie Tourer version had a windshield and saddlebags. A more touring-oriented version was introduced in 1999 as the Valkyrie Interstate with a full fairing, saddlebags and trunk. It was released as a naked bike, but also had a Tourer and an Interstate model. These two incarnations lasted relatively short and were re-absorbed by the Goldwing line.

These Valkyrie models were dropped due to slow sales, leaving the standard Valkyrie, which was discontinued after the 2003 model year and since then intermittently new Valkyrie models introduced into the market as "limited" editions. One such case was the in 2004 released Limited Edition model, the Valkyrie Rune, complete with 1,832 cc (111.8 cu in) engine and unique styling.

The Valkyrie engine is based on the Gold Wing engine, but has solid lifters instead of hydraulic lifters, six carburetors instead of the Goldwing's two (carbs ≤ 2000, FI ≥ 2001), more aggressive camshafts, a free flowing exhaust, and altered ignition timing to increase performance.

=== Valkyrie revival ===
At the 2013 Tokyo Motor Show, Honda revealed a new naked version of the GL1800, the 2014 Valkyrie, using the same 1832cc six-cylinder engine as the Gold Wing but weighing 70 kg (150 lb) less. The new Valkyrie has increased rake and trail, front and rear suspension revised for the reduced weight, 50/50 weight distribution and large tires after the fashion of sport-bikes. Going beyond the naked bike genre, the Valkyrie's horsepower-to-weight ratio puts it clearly into the muscle bike class.

== F6B "Bagger" ==
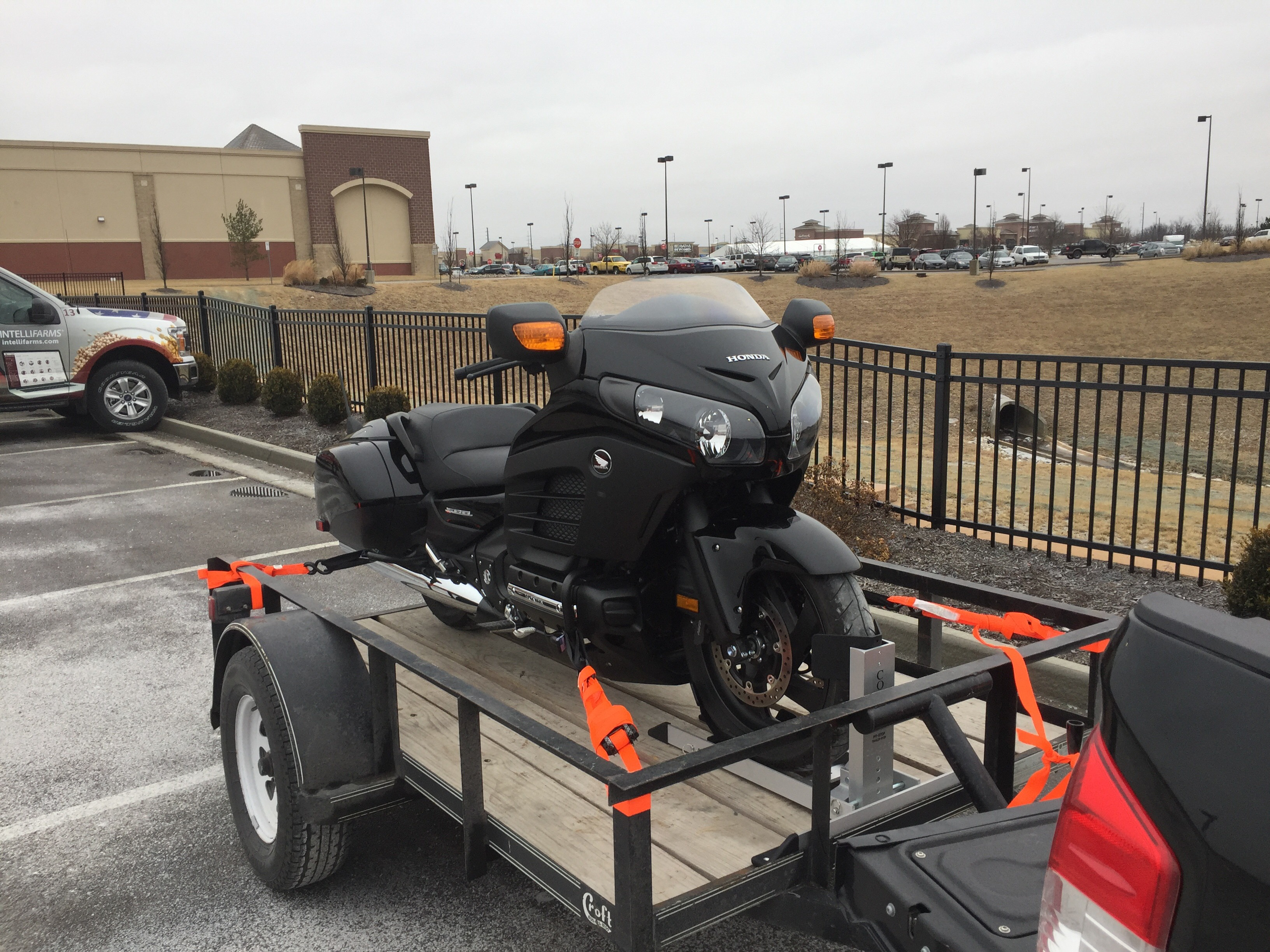
2013 model year Gold Wing F6B

In 2013, Honda brought out a new variation on the traditional Gold Wing, itself being available in two models, The F6B and F6B Deluxe. The F6B is basically a greatly stripped-down version of the 'standard' Gold Wing with most of the chrome trim being 'blacked out', giving the F6B a look that should appeal to many cruiser buyers. It is affectionately known as the Bagger. The rear trunk has been eliminated and the windshield is much smaller. The seat is changed for both the passenger and the rider with the most obvious difference being that the passenger no longer has the oversize backrest – a result of the removal of the trunk. The F6B Deluxe does, however, come with a small passenger backrest, heated grips, self cancelling turn signals & center stand as standard equipment. The basic design is, otherwise, the same as the full blown Gold Wing except that there is no reverse gear and early models did not have cruise control.

== In popular culture ==
The 4th generation Honda GL1500 Goldwing served as basis for Gunmax's Gun Bike in Japanese mecha anime series The Brave Police J-Decker.

== See also ==
- Honda Pan European
- Harley-Davidson FL
- BMW R1200RT and K1600
- Kawasaki Z1300
- Suzuki GV1400 Cavalcade
- Yamaha XS Eleven, V-Max, Yamaha Venture Royale and Royal Star Venture
