= Marysville Motorcycle Plant =

Coordinates: 40.278773°N 83.508371°W

The Marysville Motorcycle Plant was a Honda manufacturing facility located eight miles northwest of Marysville, Ohio. The assembly plant opened in 1979 as American Honda Motor Company's first production facility in the United States. It was on the original U.S. Route 33, renamed Honda Parkway when the Route was moved, at the site of an abandoned Pure Oil gas station and a long since razed "lubritorium," and the former rail crossing of the abandoned Erie Lackawanna Marion-Springfield spur.

Honda of America Manufacturing began motorcycle production at the Marysville Motorcycle Plant in 1979 with the CR250M Elsinore. All-terrain vehicles as well as the Gold Wing and Magna motorcycles, among others, were made there. The 500,000th vehicle produced at the plant was a Gold Wing Aspencade motorcycle in 1991, and the one-millionth vehicle in 1996 was another Gold Wing Aspencade. Annual output peaked at 174,000 vehicles in 1997. Production of ATVs at the plant ceased in 2005. In June 2009, the Marysville Motorcycle Plant ceased production after almost 30 years, as Honda consolidated global production of specific large motorcycles at a new factory in Kumamoto Prefecture, Japan.

Some employees there were moved to the Marysville Auto Plant, located at the same facility, or took early retirement.

Honda consolidated suspension sub-assembly for its vehicles including: Honda Accord, Acura TL and Acura RDX at the old motorcycle plant to free up space at Honda's auto plants in order to add flexibility and increase production.

This facility is now used to receive parts and sequence them for consumption at the line at the Marysville Auto Plant.

== See also ==
- Marysville Auto Plant
- East Liberty Auto Plant
