= Emilio Scotto =

Argentine motorcycling journalist

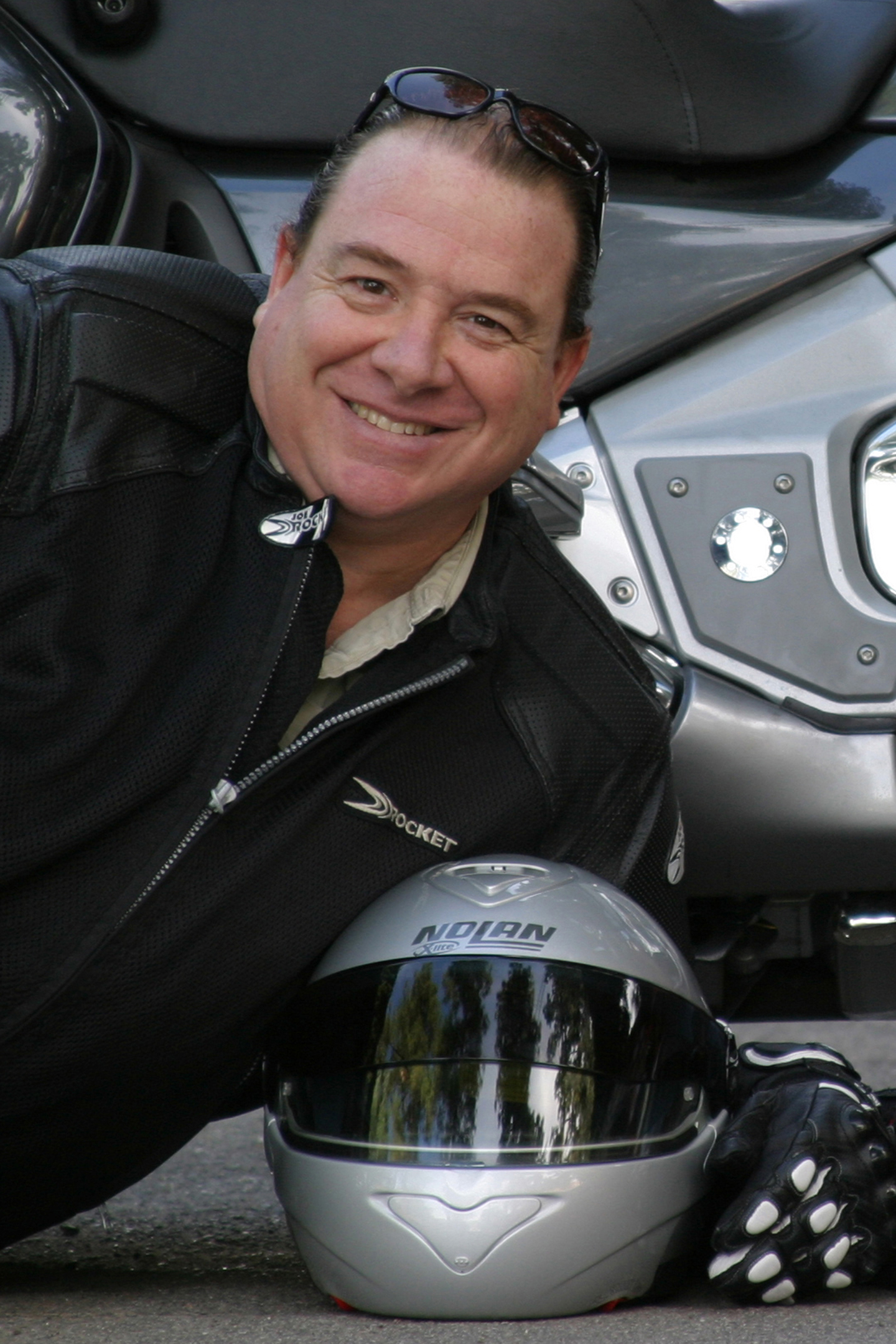
- Born: Emilio Walter Eduardo Alfredo Scotto; September 27, 1954 (age 71); Buenos Aires, Argentina
- Occupations: Motorcycle traveler, adventurer, writer and motivational speaker
- Spouse: Monica Pino

Emilio Scotto (Buenos Aires, September 27, 1954) is an Argentine adventurer, photojournalist, and writer. As of 2009 he holds the Guinness record for the world's longest motorcycle ride, spanning 10 years, 214 countries and a total distance of 457,000 miles (735,000 km). The ride was done on a 1980 Honda Gold Wing GL1100 motorcycle Scotto calls "Black Princess", which now sits in the Don's Riverside Car Museum in Laughlin, Nevada. Scotto recounted his travels in a 224-page book illustrated with his photographs, The Longest Ride: My Ten-Year 500,000 Mile Motorcycle Journey, published in 2007.

== Biography ==
In 1985, Scotto quit his job as a Buenos Aires sales representative for the pharmaceutical company Pfizer to see the world on his five-year-old 1100 cc Honda Goldwing Interstate.

By the end of his journey in 1995, Scotto went through 13 64-page passports and his motorcycle received one replacement engine, consumed 12,500 US gallons (47,000 L) of gasoline, 350 US gallons (1,300 L) of oil, 86 tires, 12 batteries and nine new seats.

Scotto's odyssey was often perilous, including journeys through Nicaragua in 1985 during its civil war and Kuwait prior to the 1991 invasion by Iraq. The most dangerous part of his trip, he would later recall, came in Africa when he was arrested as a suspected spy in Burundi, Chad and Cameroon. He was also jailed on suspicion of carrying a forged passport in Zimbabwe. In Liberia, he came into the country during a period of military upheaval and needed to hide in a diplomatic compound in Monrovia for several days until he could receive safe passage out of the country.

Scotto was not able to arrange to bring his motorcycle into North Korea, but he was able to walk by foot around the demarcation zone separating that country from South Korea. He was nearly denied access to China when border officials insisted that he pay a $70,000 entry fee. Intervention by the Motorcycle Club of Beijing helped him enter the country without any prepayment.

Although Scotto did not publicize his journey when he first departed, news of his adventure began to spread during his travels. In late 1986, when he was stranded in New York City, a television news report helped bring in donations that allowed him to cross the ocean. Scotto was able to personally present a letter to Pope John Paul II at the Vatican, and Libyan leader Col. Muammar al-Gaddafi provided him with $300 for the African portion of his journey. During the later part of his journey, he received corporate sponsorship from Pepsi, Agip and Metzeler.

In 1991, Scotto married Monica Pino in New Delhi, India. She was his companion on the final four years of his trek.

== Reviews of The Longest Ride ==
A lighthearted capsule review by The Daily Telegraph recommended The Longest Ride on the strength of the approximately 200 photographs.
