= Suzuki GV1400 Cavalcade =

Japanese luxury touring motorcycle

The GV1400 Cavalcade was a Suzuki luxury touring motorcycle available from 1985 to 1988 in North America. It was available in Europe until 1991. There were three model lines, the GT, LX, and LXE. Each successive model gaining more standard features. Suzuki was the last of the major motorcycle manufacturers to introduce a luxury tourer. The Cavalcade was the largest, heaviest, and most powerful luxury tourer in 1985.

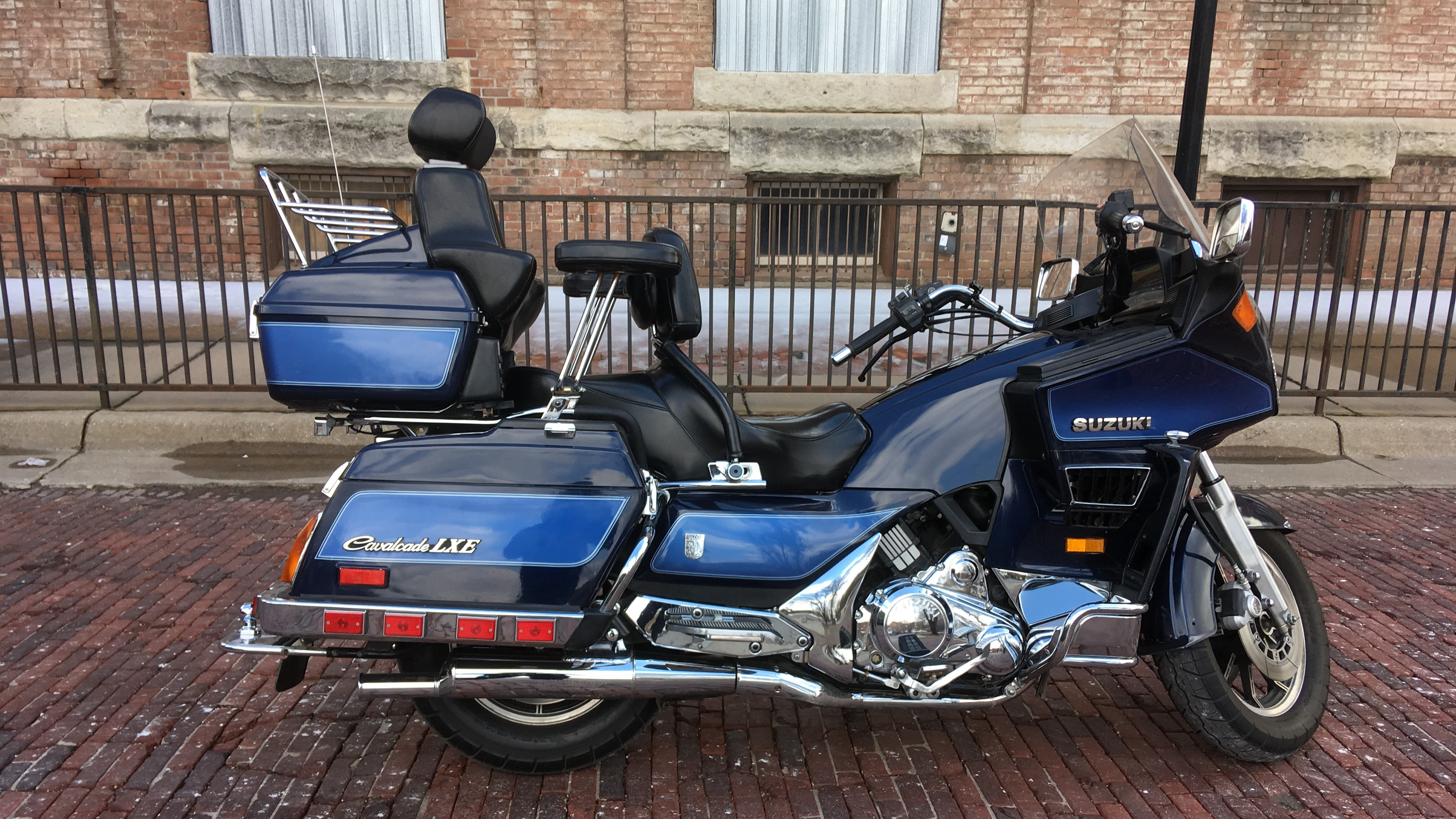
Suzuki GV1400 LXE

== Design ==
The Cavalcade features a 16 valve DOHC 1360 cc V4 with hydraulic lash adjusters and shaft drive for low maintenance. Many of the standard features on the Cavalcade were considered options on other motorcycles in 1985. The LX and LXE models feature self-cancelling turn signals, automatic rear pneumatic leveling system, rear suspension load pre-tensioner, air-adjustable damping on the front shocks that could be refilled with a standard tire pump connection, electronic cruise control, radio and cassette deck with LCD station, volume and station selection controls on the handlebars, adjustment knob for the headlight, adjustable passenger floorboards, fore to aft top case adjustment for passenger comfort, adjustable handlebars and adjustable windshield. The radio is in a decorative housing that resembles a standard motorcycle fuel tank. The radio has an automatic volume control that raises and lowers the radio volume based on the speed of the motorcycle. The Cavalcade fuel tank is located under the driver's seat but is filled from the top of the decorative tank. A standard automobile-type oil filter is located midline of the underside of the chassis between the exhaust pipes. The engine is liquid cooled with a thermostatically-controlled electric fan. The radio antenna could be unscrewed and lowered so as not to interfere with the positioning of the weather cover, which was standard with all models.

There are two key-locked storage boxes for the driver on either side of the fairing. There are two storage boxes for the passenger on the top of each side case. The passenger backrest has arm rests. The weather cover has a steel cable running along the lower edge with eye grommets for a padlock or wire-cable lock. The top case has an interior light and vanity mirror. The top case is large enough to accept a full face helmet. Two helmet locks that use the ignition key are just below the top case and above the license plate. Soft, form-fitted bags came standard for the side cases and the top case. The console features a LCD that has the gear position indicator as well as warnings for low battery water and "kickstand down." The bike had a switch linked to the kickstand that would kill the engine if the bike were put in gear with the kickstand in the down position. There are vents near the ignition key that allow air to be directed towards the driver's face and doors on both sides of the fairing that can be opened to allow engine heat to be directed toward the driver's legs. The passenger had controls to adjust the radio volume and station selection. The passenger seat has a 3-way adjustable passenger seat on both models. LXE models were equipped with cornering lights, air adjustable driver's seat, coin-holder and map case in the driver's storage boxes, leg wind deflectors and driver/passenger intercom jacks. There was a CB radio option. A driver backrest and passenger headrest were options. They are also equipped with an electrical accessory plug and a 500 watt alternator.

== See also ==
- Honda Gold Wing
