= Intermot =

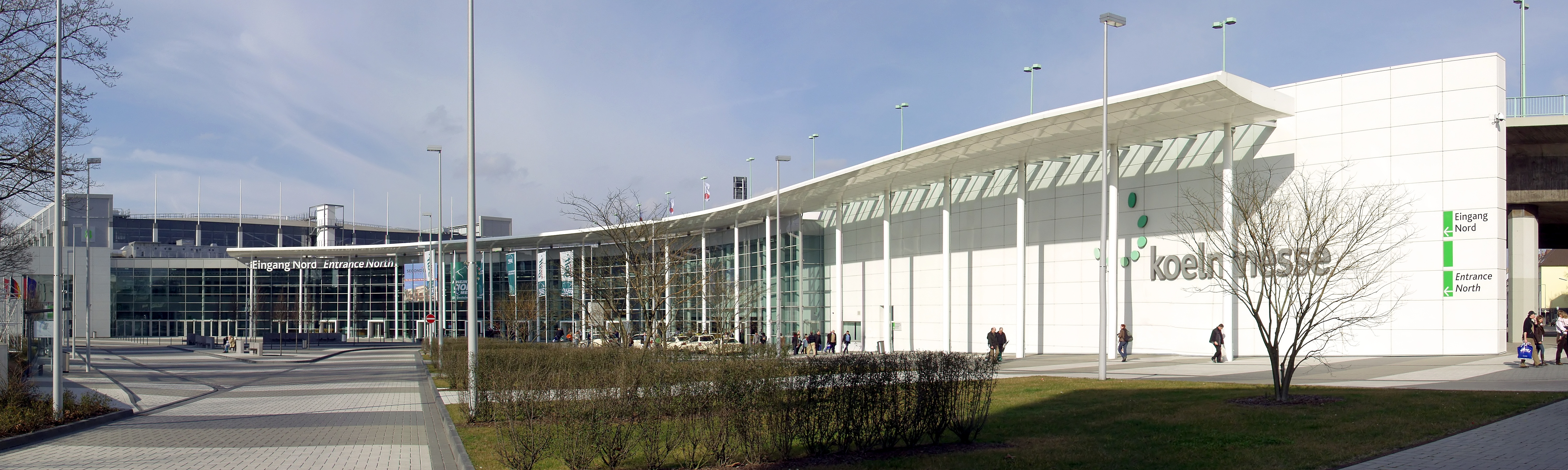
Koelnmesse North Entrance (2008)

INTERMOT Cologne is a biennial trade show for motorcycle manufacturers. The trade show began in Munich in 1998, though it was founded in Cologne. Since 2006 it has moved to Koelnmesse in Cologne. The Intermot 2006 had over 1,000 exhibitors and some 187,000 visitors.
