= Honda CL360 =

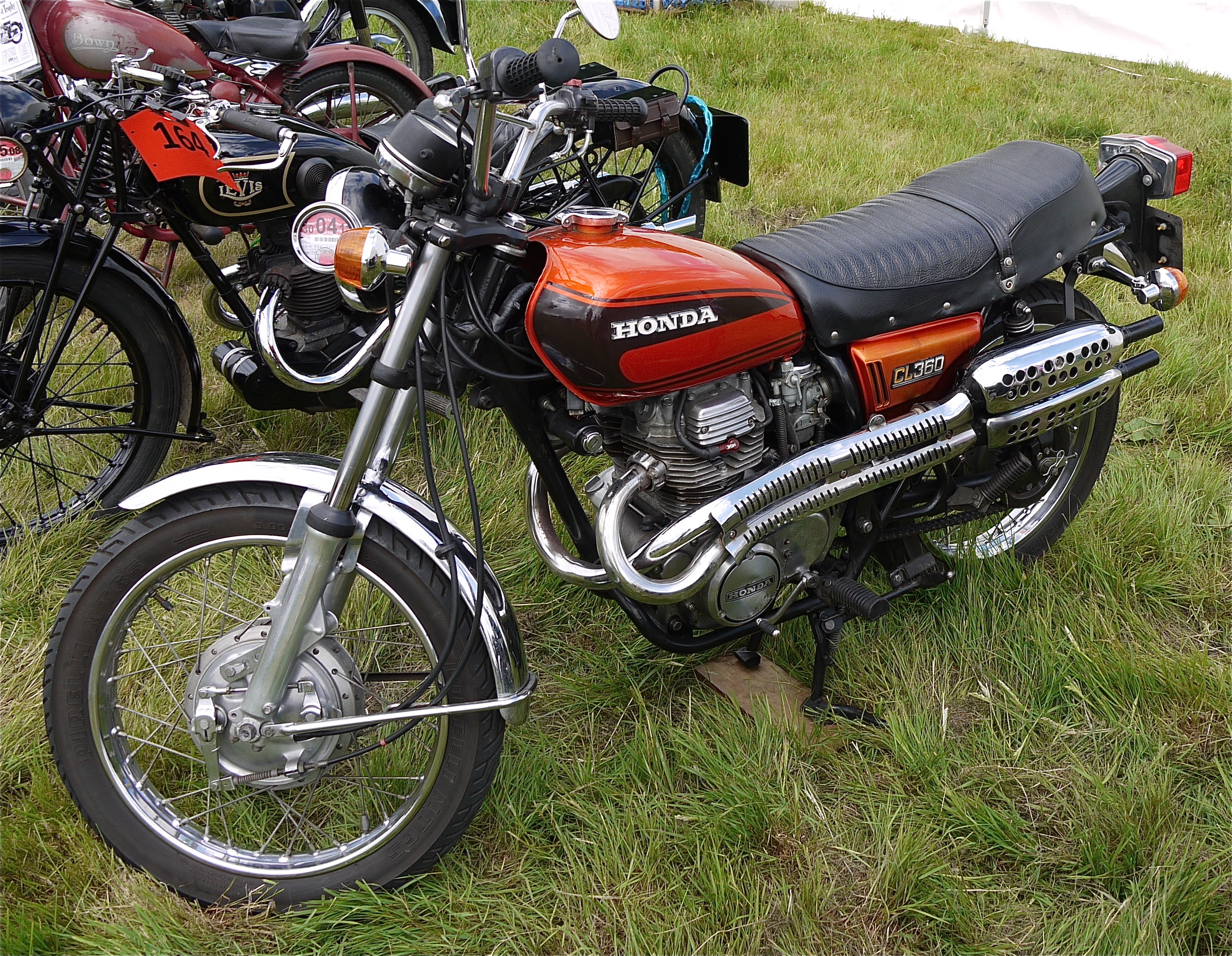
- Manufacturer: Honda
- Production: 1974–1976
- Predecessor: Honda CL350
- Class: Scrambler
- Engine: 356 cc (21.7 cu in) OHC air-cooled parallel twin
- Bore / stroke: 67 mm × 50.6 mm (2.64 in × 1.99 in)
- Compression ratio: 9.3:1
- Ignition type: points
- Transmission: 6-speed chain drive manual
- Suspension: Front: telescoping fork Rear: swingarm
- Brakes: Front: drum Rear: drum
- Tires: Front: 3.00 in × 18 in (76 mm × 457 mm); Rear: 3.50 in × 18 in (89 mm × 457 mm)
- Wheelbase: 53 in (1,300 mm)
- Dimensions: L: 80.3 in (2,040 mm); W: 32.3 in (820 mm); H: 44.3 in (1,130 mm)
- Seat height: 31.9 in (810 mm)
- Fuel capacity: 2.4 US gal (9.1 L; 2.0 imp gal)
- Oil capacity: 2 US qt (1,900 ml)

The Honda CL360 is a twin cylinder four-stroke scrambler motorcycles produced from 1974 to 1976. It was the successor to the CL350. The CL360 is very similar to the CB360, the most notable difference being the high exhaust pipes that many consider very desirable. Other differences were a higher rear fender than the CB360, as well as braced motocross-style handlebars.

Following in the footsteps of the successful CL350 Twin, the CL360 of 1974 was a new motorcycle. The 360 engine was tuned for broad range torque, and ran through a six speed gearbox.

The model had a short manufacturing life from 1974 to 1976 and did not gain market success despite improvements in some areas. The poor acceptance resulted from several factors including:

- Early faults with cam shafts
- Handling that many considered poor compared with the CB350
- Inferior performance and economy compared to its predecessor
- Lower performance than comparable two stroke models of similar capacity, notably Yamaha RD350
