= Honda CB400 =

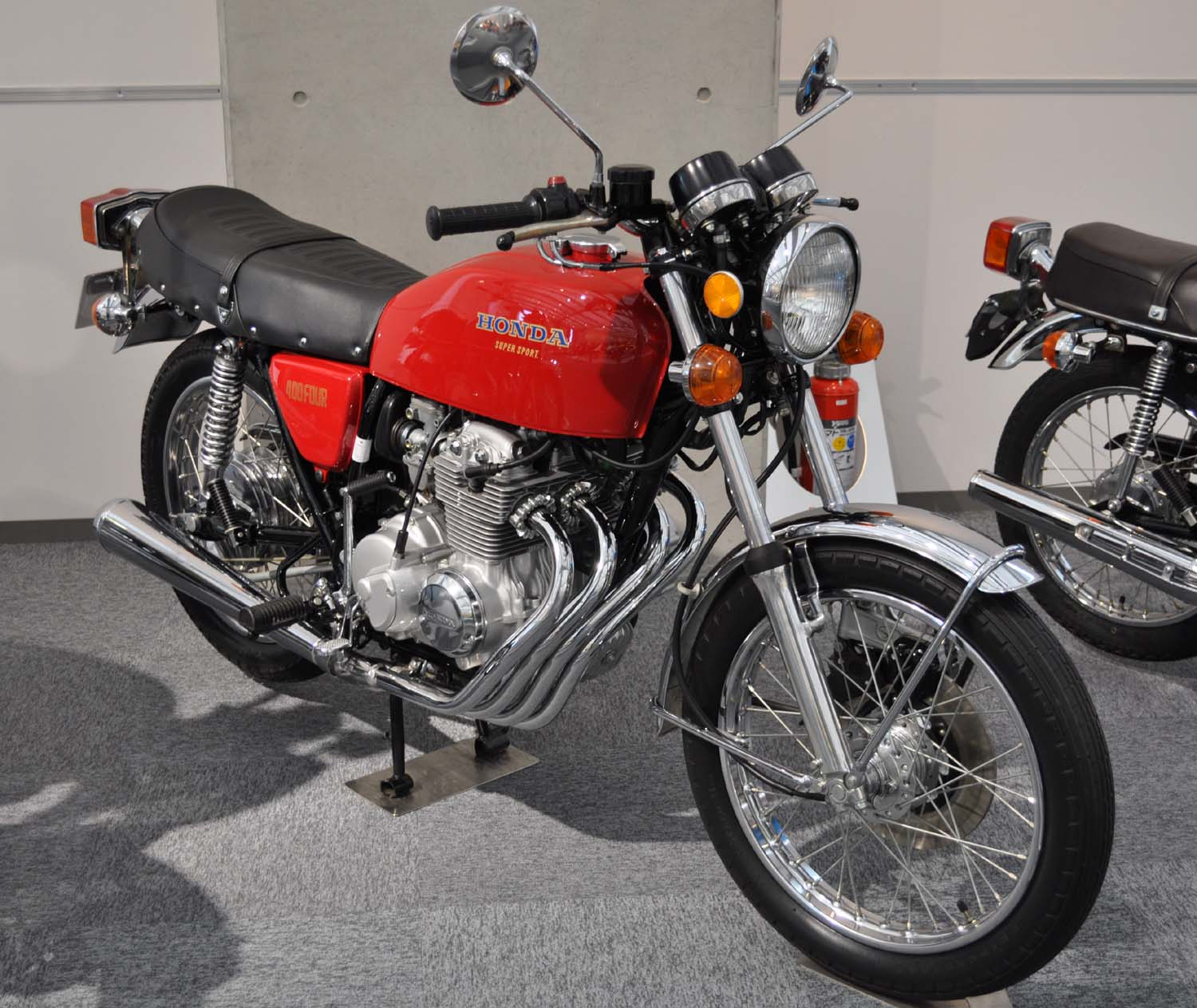
Honda Dream CB400 Four

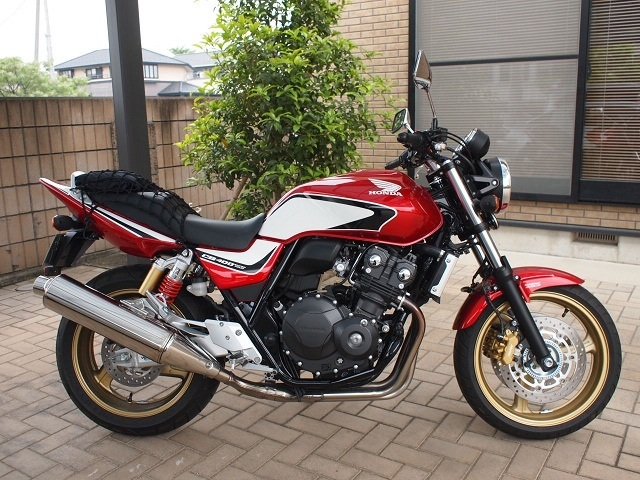
Honda CB400 Super Four

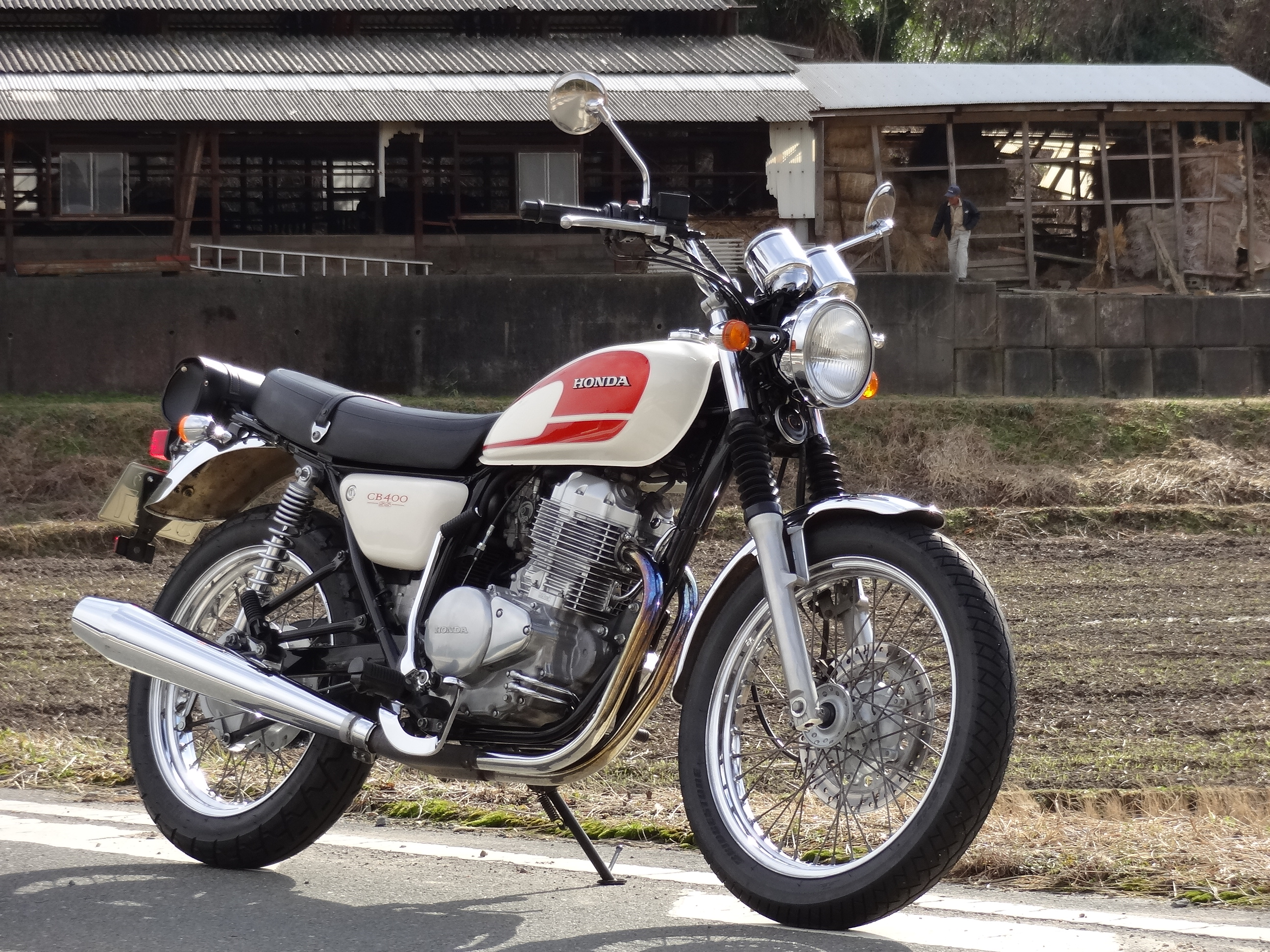
Honda CB400SS

The designation CB400 has applied to ten Honda motorcycle families:

- CB400F (1975–1977)
  - 408 cc (24.9 cu in) SOHC, inline-four. 6-speed manual gearbox
- CB400A Hawk Hondamatic (1978)
  - 395 cc (24.1 cu in) SOHC, 6-valve, parallel-twin. 2-speed automatic gearbox
- CB400TI Hawk I (1978–1979)
  - 395 cc (24.1 cu in) SOHC, 6-valve, parallel-twin. 5-speed manual gearbox
- CB400TII Hawk II (1978–1979)
  - 395 cc (24.1 cu in) SOHC, 6-valve, parallel-twin. 5-speed manual gearbox
- CB400N (1978–1986)
  - 395 cc (24.1 cu in) SOHC, 6-valve, parallel-twin
- CB400T Hawk (1980–1981)
  - 395 cc (24.1 cu in) SOHC, 6-valve, parallel-twin. 6-speed manual gearbox
- Honda CB-1 (CB400F) (1989–1990)
  - 399 cc (24.3 cu in) DOHC, 16-valve, inline-four. 6-speed manual gearbox
- CB400 Super Four (1992–2022)
  - 399 cc (24.3 cu in) DOHC, 16-valve, inline-four. 6-speed manual gearbox
- CB400 Four (NC36, 1997–2001)
  - 399 cc (24.3 cu in) DOHC, 16-valve, inline-four. 5-speed manual gearbox
- CB400SS (NC41, 2002–2006)
  - 397 cc (24.2 cu in) SOHC, 4-valve, single-cylinder. 5-speed manual gearbox
- CB400F (NC47, 2013–2016)
  - 399 cc (24.3 cu in) DOHC, 8-valve, parallel-twin. 6-speed manual gearbox

== CB440S ==
The Honda CB440S was a special version offered by a Honda dealership in São Paulo, Brazil in 1983. This was a CB400 with a 447 cc engine with some imported parts as lightweight crankcase, larger pistons and new suspension arms.
