= CB-1 =

CB-1 could refer to one of three things:

- USS Alaska (CB-1), a "large cruiser"/battlecruiser that served in the U.S. Navy during World War II.
- Honda CB-1, a small sportsbike.
- Hatz CB-1, a 1960s light biplane that was designed by John Hatz.
