= Honda CB400 Super Four =

Japanese motorcycle

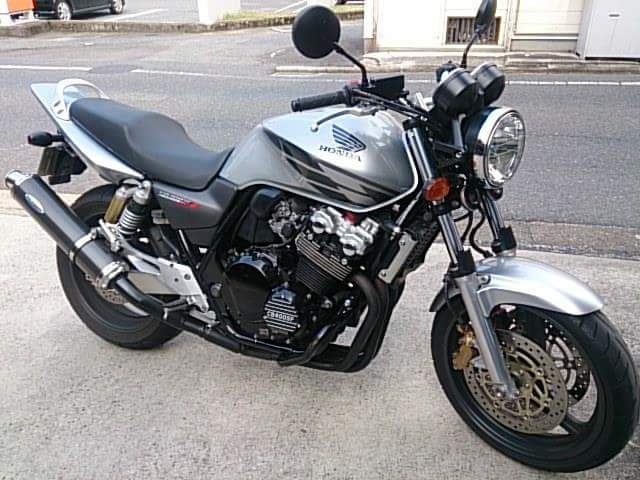
- Manufacturer: Honda
- Production: 1992 – October 2022; 2026–present
- Predecessor: Honda CB400F
- Class: Standard
- Engine: 399 cc (24.3 cu in) liquid-cooled 4-stroke 16-valve DOHC inline-four
- Bore / stroke: 55 mm × 42 mm (2.17 in × 1.65 in)
- Compression ratio: 11.3:1
- Power: 41 kW (56 PS) @ 11,000 rpm (claimed)
- Torque: 39 N⋅m (29 lb⋅ft) @ 9,500 rpm (claimed)
- Transmission: 6-speed, wet multi-plate clutch, manual, chain drive
- Suspension: Front: 41 mm Showa telescopic fork with pre-load adjustment Rear: Dual remote reservoir Showa shock with spring pre-load adjustment
- Brakes: Front: Dual 285 mm floating discs, combined ABS; Rear: Single 235 mm disc, combined ABS
- Tires: Front: 120/60 ZR17 55W; Rear: 160/60 ZR17 69W
- Rake, trail: 25.5°05' 90 mm (3.5 in)
- Wheelbase: 1,410 mm (55.5 in)
- Dimensions: L: 2,040 mm (80.3 in); W: 725 mm (28.5 in); H: 1,070 mm (42.1 in)
- Seat height: 755 mm (29.7 in)
- Weight: 200 kg (441 lb) (wet)
- Fuel capacity: 18 L (4.0 imp gal; 4.8 US gal)
- Turning radius: 2,600 mm (102.4 in)
- Related: Honda CB500 Super Four (2026–present); Honda CBR400R Four (2026–present)

The Honda CB400 Super Four is a standard motorcycle in the Honda CB series, fitted with a 399 cc (24.3 cu in) engine. It has been produced by Honda at the Kumamoto plant from 1992 to 2022, and again since 2026. The CB400 embodies the typical Universal Japanese Motorcycle produced through the 1970s, updated with modern technology. To this end, the bike has a naked retro design, paired with a smooth inline-four engine. Originally a Japan-only bike, it was later also available in Southeast Asia, and from 2008 in Australia.

== Model history ==
Unveiled in 1991 at the 29th Tokyo Motor Show as a 400 cc version of the CB1000 Super Four, the motorcycle was introduced in Japan for the 1992 model year, with an engine similar to that of the early CB-1.

=== 1992–1998 ===
1992: The CB400 Super Four introduced the updated CB-1 engine, tilted backwards to obtain a more erect cylinder bank. Carburetors changed from down-draft to side-draft type, but still of a constant velocity design. A more conventional chain drive system replaced the gear cam drive system, setting the red-line at 12,500 rpm. Wider gear ratios defined the versatility of Honda's intention for the bike.

1994: Updates to the ignition timing due to adoption of the pent-roof combustion chamber design, the internal structure of the muffler, and the shape of the cam chain links for reduced mechanical noise. The engine mount location was updated for improved handling. A new instrument cluster appeared with the analogue fuel gauge moved to a central location from previously within the tachometer face, a row of indicator LEDs below the clocks, and a hazard light switch. Weight increased by 1 kg (2.2 lb).

1995: More cooling fins were added on the lower side portion of the cylinder bank.
A special edition Super Four version R model offered PGM-IG programmed ignition timing along with electronic controlled valve operation, in addition to a headlight cowl, sharper rake angle, lightweight aluminium muffler, stiffer suspension and sintered brake pads.

1996: New front brake discs with reduced tendency to warp, and opposed four-piston calipers for improved initial response.
A special edition Super Four version S model was available with Brembo brakes and Showa suspension.

1997: Updates to the carburetor air funnels, the internal muffler structure, and the Nissin brakes. Version S model also received electronically controlled ignition (PGM-IG). Weight increased by 1 kg (2.2 lb).

=== 1999–2001 ===
1999: The CB400SF Hyper VTEC introduced major engine improvements through the use of Honda's VTEC system. While having four valves per cylinder, below 6750 rpm one intake and exhaust pair are disabled. This technique improved the engine's low and mid-range power and efficiency, while retaining performance over 6,750 rpm by resuming four valve operation. The light-weight aluminium muffler (previously special edition), 40 mm shorter wheelbase, 10 mm lower engine mount position, and front suspension lifted from the super-sport CBR900RR resulted in improved handling. Weight reduced by 6 kg (13 lb).

2000: Stronger combination switch to deter theft.

=== 2002–2003 ===
2002: The CB400SF Hyper VTEC Spec II changed the operation of the VTEC system to trigger at 6,300 rpm along with updated ignition timing map. An LCD odometer/trip-meter and clock + fuel gauge were integrated in the speedometer and tachometer faces respectively, as well as adding the HISS ignition security system. Air intake noise was reduced by enhancing the surface rigidity of the air cleaner case. Lighter, smaller oil filter and front brake calipers were lifted from the super-sport CBR900RR. Chipping guards were added to the front fork tubes. Weight increased by 1 kg (2.2 lb).

=== 2004–2007 ===
2004: The CB400SF Hyper VTEC Spec III further changed the operation of the VTEC system to trigger at 6,750 rpm in 6th gear, remaining at 6,300 rpm in gears 1–5, along with further updated ignition timing map. Increased quantity of glass wool in the exhaust pipe collector reduces exhaust noise to 72 dB to comply with government regulations. A new lower seat with single grab rail instead of surface belt, light rear brake caliper and updated front suspension offer better ergonomics. Multi-reflector headlight, LED tail-lights, new fuel tank and rear cowl provide improved safety and styling. Weight increased by 1 kg (2.2 lb).

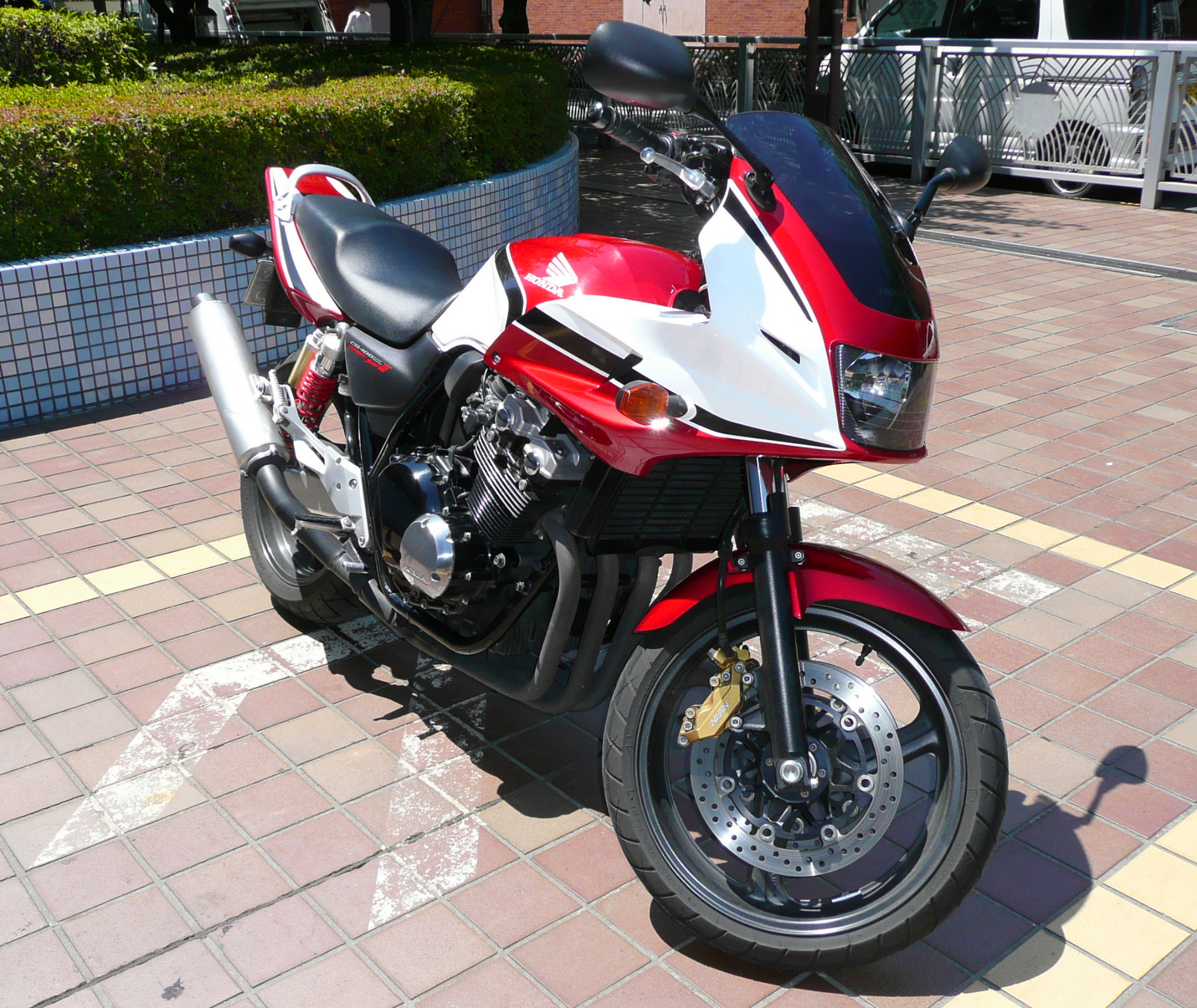
CB400 Super Bol d'Or

2005: Added analogue pre-load adjustment mechanism for the front suspension and high-density polyurethane material for the seat cushion. From 2005, the half-fairing equipped CB400 Super Bol d'Or has been available in Japan; later in Southeast Asia as well.

2006: Larger ignition coils supply a more stable spark at lower rpms; clear smoke lenses on the turn indicator lights.

=== 2008–2022 ===
2008: The CB400SF Hyper VTEC Revo introduced Honda's PGM-FI programmed fuel injection and an idle air control valve for improved fuel economy and reliability. Revised engine materials and an integrated crank-case cover reduced the engine weight by 2 kg (4.4 lb). The VTEC operation was further refined such that in gears 1–5 four-valve operation engaged at 6,300 rpm for wide open throttle, otherwise at 6,750 rpm, and remaining at 6,750 rpm in 6th gear. Independent cylinder ignition timing map, revised air intake geometry and a larger stainless steel muffler contribute to fuel efficiency. Updated frame rigidity and engine mounting position improved handling. Optional combined ABS uses three-piston sliding calipers on the front brakes instead of the standard four-piston opposed calipers and a larger 256 mm rear brake disc. Weight increased by 4 kg (8.8 lb), and 9 kg (20 lb) with ABS.

2014: Central LCD screen with gear position, fuel consumption, thermometer and heater level for the handle grips (available with the "E Package"), 10-spoke wheels, round mirrors and dual grab rails on a revised rear cowl with LED rear lights and clear lens. Revised frame geometry brought the handlebars 10 mm higher and 7 mm closer to the rider, and also reduced the rise angle of the tail end, both changes resulting in a more upright riding position. Revised half-fairing with LED headlight for the Super Bol d'Or. Weight increased by 3 kg (6.6 lb).

Genuine accessories available from Honda include a rear carrier storage box that installs in place of the dual grab rails, a 12V power socket that plugs into the wiring harness, and a central stand.

2018: 25th anniversary model of Honda's PROJECT BIG 1 (SuperFour since 1992), smaller 2-chamber muffler and updated throttle bodies to comply with emissions regulations, also increased the maximum power to 41 kW (55 hp). LED headlight, updated front and rear suspension, right-angle tyre valve stems, and push type helmet lock bracket. Super Bol d'Or is available with ABS only. Weight increased by 2 kg (4.4 lb).

=== 2026–present ===
2026: The CB400SF E-Clutch introduced Honda's E-Clutch technology which automatically controls the clutch, and a throttle-by-wire system which contributes to direct throttle response.

== Specifications ==
All specifications are manufacturer claimed unless otherwise specified. The motorcycle model designation is printed on a sticker under the seat.

Model	Super Four	SF Hyper VTEC	SF Hyper VTEC Spec II	SF Hyper VTEC Spec III	SF Hyper VTEC Revo
Years	1992–1998	1999–2001	2002–2003	2004–2007	2008–present
Availability	Japan, SE Asia	Japan, SE Asia			Japan, SE Asia, Australia (2008–2016)
Engine	NC23E	NC39			NC42E
four-stroke inline-4, DOHC, 16 valves, liquid-cooled
Displacement	399 cc (24.3 cu in)				
Bore × stroke	55.0 mm × 42.0 mm (2.17 in × 1.65 in)				
Compression ratio	11.3:1				
Fuel delivery	Keihin VP22 32 mm carburetors ×4	Keihin VP04 32 mm carburetors ×4	Keihin VP04B 32 mm carburetors ×4	Keihin VP04B 32 mm carburetors ×4	Honda PGM-FI
Ignition	Fully transistorized	Fully transistorized			Fully transistorized with ignition advance
Maximum power	39 kW (53 PS) at 11,000 rpm	39 kW (53 PS) at 11,000 rpm			39 kW (53 PS) at 10,500 rpm (2008–17); 41 kW (56 PS) at 11,000 rpm (2018–2022)
Maximum torque	36 N⋅m (27 lb⋅ft) at 10,000 rpm	38 N⋅m (28 lb⋅ft) at 9,500 rpm			38 N⋅m (28 lb⋅ft) at 9,500 rpm (2008–17); 39 N⋅m (29 lb⋅ft) at 9,500 rpm (2018–2022)
Transmission	6-speed sequential, constant mesh				
Clutch	Wet, multi-plate, coil spring				
Final drive	525 o-ring chain				
Frame	Tubular steel, double cradle				
Rake	27°15'	25°15'	25°15'	25°05'	25°05'
Trail	109 mm (4.3 in)	89 mm (3.5 in)	89 mm (3.5 in)	90 mm (3.5 in)	90 mm (3.5 in)
Turning radius	2.6 m (8 ft 6 in)	2.6 m (8 ft 6 in)			2.6 m (8 ft 6 in)
Front wheel	17M/C × MT3.00	17M/C × MT3.50			17M/C × MT3.50
Rear wheel	17M/C × MT4.00	17M/C × MT4.50			17M/C × MT4.50
Front tyre	110/70 –17 54H	120/60 ZR17 55W			120/60 ZR17 55W
Rear tyre	140/70 –17 66H	160/60 ZR17 69W			160/60 ZR17 69W
Front brake	Dual 296 mm floating discs	Dual 296 mm floating discs			Dual 296 mm floating discs, combined ABS
Rear brake	Single 240 mm disc	Single 240 mm disc			Single 256 mm disc, combined ABS
Wheelbase	1,455 mm (57.3 in)	1,415 mm (55.7 in)	1,410 mm (56 in)	1,410 mm (56 in)	1,410 mm (56 in)
Overall length	2,085 mm (82.1 in)	2,050 mm (81 in)	2,050 mm (81 in)	2,040 mm (80 in)	2,040 mm (80 in)
Overall width	735 mm (28.9 in)	725 mm (28.5 in)			725 mm (28.5 in)
Overall height	1,080 mm (43 in)	1,070 mm (42 in)	1,070 mm (42 in)	1,070 mm (42 in); 1,155 mm (45.5 in) (Bol d'Or)	1,070 mm (42 in); 1,155 mm (45.5 in) (Bol d'Or)
Seat height	770 mm (30 in)	760 mm (30 in)	760 mm (30 in)	755 mm (29.7 in)	755 mm (29.7 in)
Ground clearance	125 mm (4.9 in)	130 mm (5.1 in)			130 mm (5.1 in)
Fuel tank capacity	18 L (4.0 imp gal; 4.8 US gal)				
Engine oil	3.6 L (0.79 imp gal; 0.95 US gal)	3.8 L (0.84 imp gal; 1.0 US gal)			3.8 L (0.84 imp gal; 1.0 US gal)
Dry weight	172 kg (379 lb) (1992–3); 173 kg (381 lb) (1994–6); 174 kg (384 lb) (1997–8)	168 kg (370 lb)	169 kg (373 lb)	170 kg (370 lb)	
Wet weight	192 kg (423 lb) (1992–3); 193 kg (425 lb) (1994–6); 194 kg (428 lb) (1997–8)	188 kg (414 lb)	189 kg (417 lb)	190 kg (420 lb)	194 kg (428 lb), +5 kg (11 lb) ABS, +4 kg (8.8 lb) Bol d'Or (2008–13) 197 kg (434 lb), +3 kg (6.6 lb) ABS, +3 kg (6.6 lb) Bol d'Or (2014–17) 199 kg (439 lb), +3 kg (6.6 lb) ABS, +3 kg (6.6 lb) Bol d'Or (2018–)
Fuel consumption	34.7 km/L (98 mpg_{‑imp}; 82 mpg_{‑US})	37 km/L (100 mpg_{‑imp}; 87 mpg_{‑US})			31 km/L (88 mpg_{‑imp}; 73 mpg_{‑US})

== See also ==
- Yamaha XJR400
