= Stall (engine) =

Sudden cessation of engine operation

A stall is the slowing or stopping of a process, and, in the case of an engine, refers to a sudden stopping of the engine turning, usually brought about accidentally.

It is commonly applied to the phenomenon whereby an engine abruptly ceases operating and stops turning. It might be due to not getting enough air, energy, fuel, or electric spark, fuel starvation, a mechanical failure, or in response to a sudden increase in engine load. This increase in engine load is common in vehicles with a manual transmission when the clutch is released too suddenly.

The ways in which a car can stall are usually down to the driver, especially with a manual transmission. For instance, if a driver takes their foot off the clutch too quickly while stationary then the car will stall; taking the foot off the clutch slowly will stop this from happening. Stalling also happens when the driver forgets to depress the clutch and/or change to neutral while coming to a stop. Stalling can be dangerous, especially in heavy traffic.

A car fitted with an automatic transmission could also have its engine stalled when the vehicle is travelling in the opposite direction to the selected gear. For example, if the selector is in the 'D' position and the car is moving backwards, (on a steep enough hill to overcome the torque from the torque converter) the engine will stall, because the engine is forced to turn in the opposite direction to what it is actually doing. This is because, hypothetically, if the car is rolling backward fast enough, the force from the rotating wheels will be transmitted backward through the transmission and act as a sudden load on the engine.

Digital electronics fuel injection and ECU ignition systems have greatly reduced stalling in modern engines.

== Anti-stall systems ==
An anti-stall system is an automatically operated electronic clutch control device preventing the stalling of an engine by engaging the clutch when the ECU detects that the engine revs are too low. They are used in motorsports such as Formula One and Indy Car, but not Formula 2 and Formula 3, and may be regarded as a driver aid since it usually keeps the engine running even if the car stops on track while in gear. It is also sometimes used on production cars.

== See also ==
- Stall torque
- Dashpot
- Idle air control actuator
