= Honda CB360 =

Honda CB360, CB360T
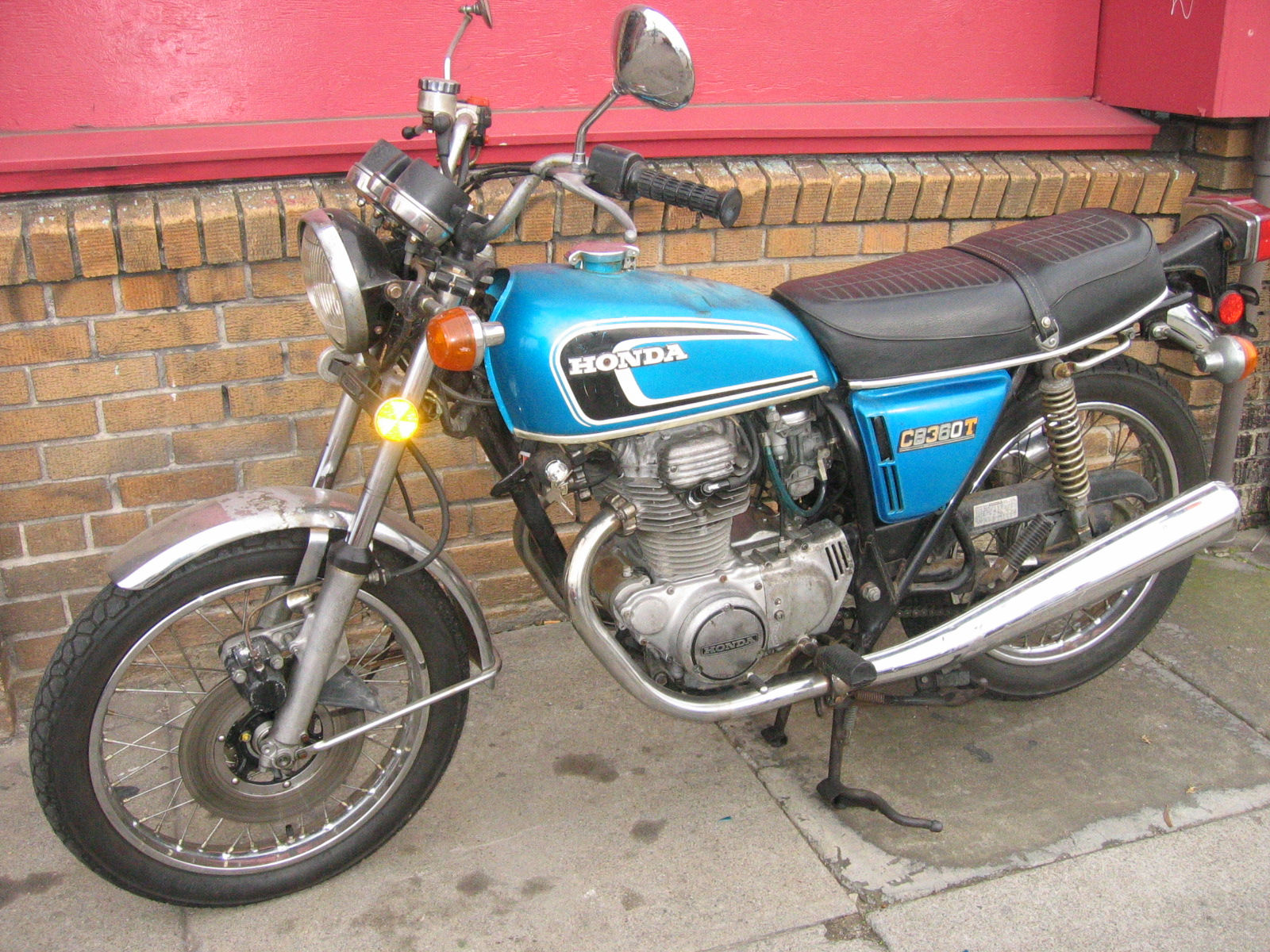
- Manufacturer: Honda
- Production: 1974–1976
- Predecessor: Honda CB350
- Successor: Honda CB400T
- Engine: 356 cc (21.7 cu in) OHC air-cooled 2 valves/cyl 180° parallel twin,
- Bore / stroke: 67 mm × 50.6 mm (2.64 in × 1.99 in)
- Compression ratio: 9.3:1
- Power: 34.00 hp (25.35 kW) @ 9000 RPM
- Transmission: 6-speed chain drive manual
- Frame type: Semi-double cradle
- Suspension: Front: telescoping fork Rear: swingarm
- Brakes: Front: drum (base model); Front: disc (T model); Rear: drum
- Tires: 3.00 in × 18 in (76 mm × 457 mm) (front) 3.50 in × 18 in (89 mm × 457 mm) (rear)
- Rake, trail: ?°/92 mm (3.6 in)
- Wheelbase: 53 in (1,300 mm)
- Dimensions: L: 80.3 in (2,040 mm); W: 30.5 in (770 mm); H: 42.1 in (1,070 mm)
- Seat height: 810 mm (32 in)
- Weight: 357 lb (162 kg) (dry); 392.4 lb (178.0 kg) (wet)
- Fuel capacity: 2.9 US gal (11 L; 2.4 imp gal)
- Oil capacity: 0.7 US gal (2.6 L; 0.58 imp gal)

The Honda CB360 is a twin cylinder motorcycle introduced by Honda in 1974. Although industry observers called the CB360 "unexciting" and "mediocre", the model was a commercial success, with more than 2 million units built and sold in its first year of production (including the smaller CB250G).

It succeeded the Honda CB350 and provided an alternative to the four cylinder CB350F and CB400F. The CB360 was a new design. The 356 cc engine was tuned for broad range torque, and drove the rear wheel through a six-speed gearbox. The base CB360 model was equipped with front and rear drum brakes, while the CB360t version had a front hydraulic disc brake. It was produced through 1976.

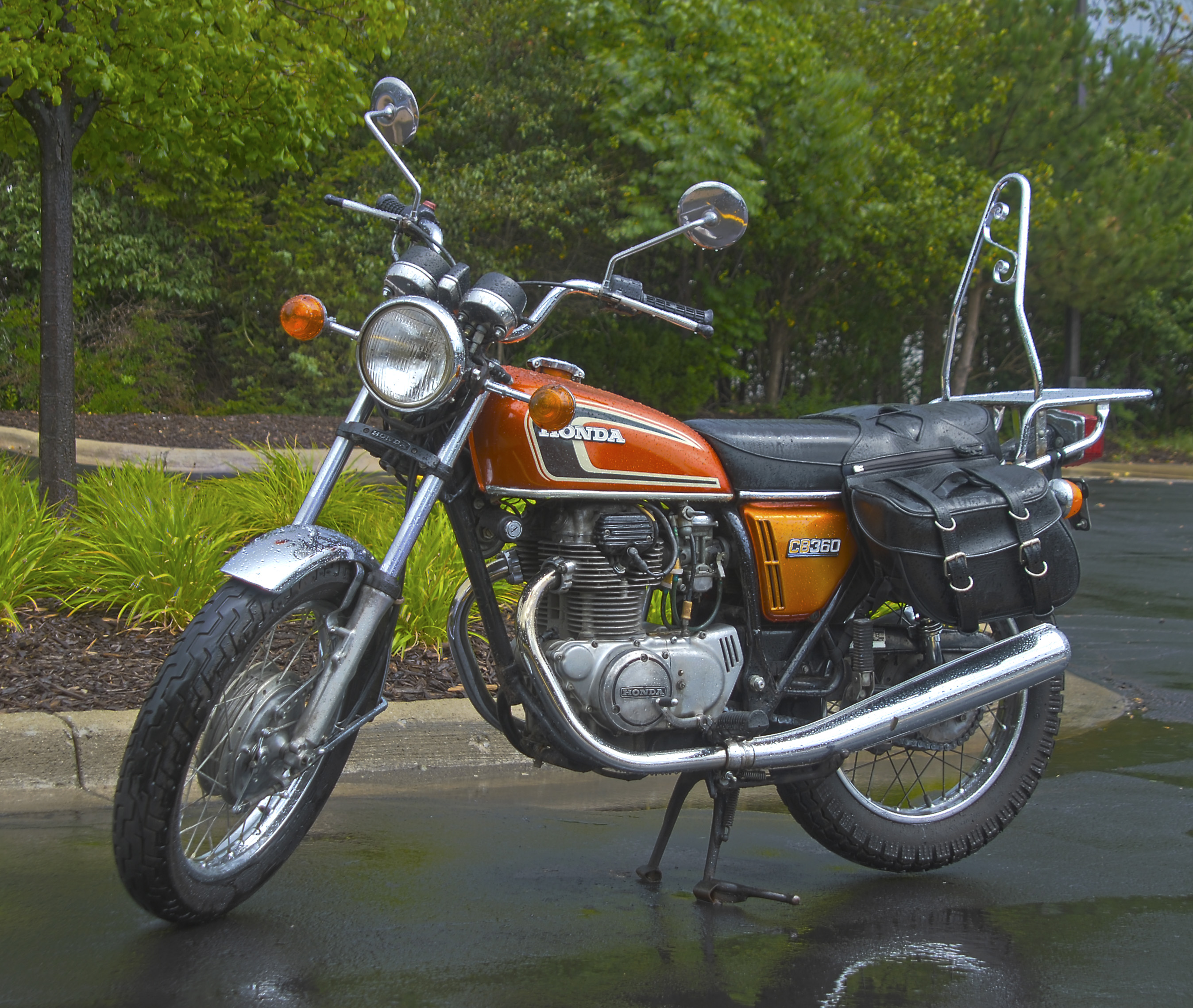
