= Yamaha XJR1200 =

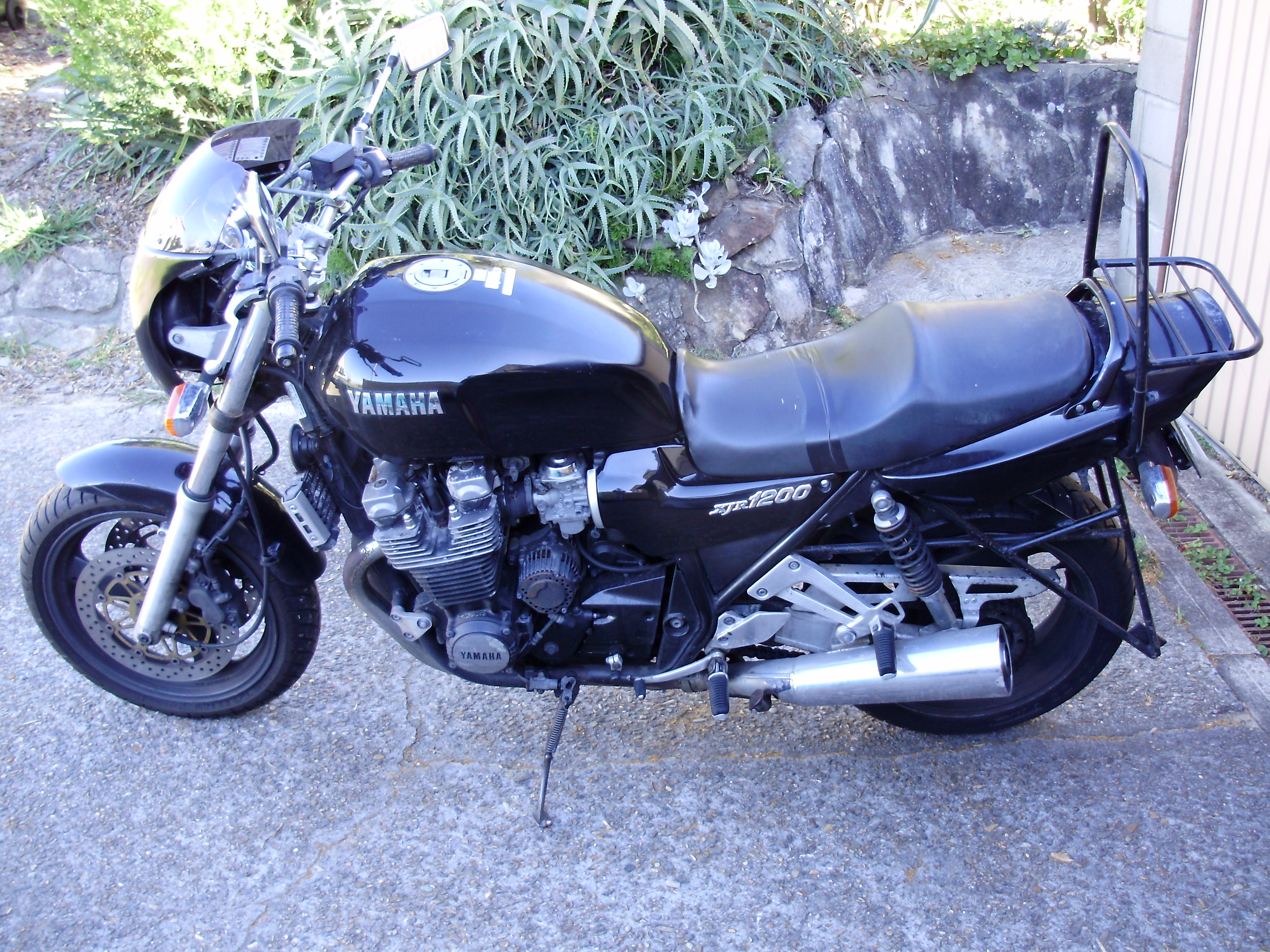
- Manufacturer: Yamaha
- Production: 1995–1999
- Successor: XJR 1300
- Class: Sport touring
- Engine: 1,188 cc Inline-4, air cooled
- Power: 73,1 KW (98 hp) @ 8,000 rpm
- Torque: 91.2 Nm (67.3 ft. lbs) @ 6000rpm
- Transmission: 5-speed manual
- Brakes: Front: dual 320mm discs Rear: single 267 mm disc
- Wheelbase: 1500mm
- Seat height: 790 mm
- Weight: 232 kg (dry)
- Fuel capacity: 21L
- Related: Yamaha XJR400

The Yamaha XJR1200 is a motorcycle manufactured by the Yamaha Motor Company. It was designed in the early 1990s to compete with the high powered naked bikes already on the market such as the Kawasaki Zephyr 1100 and Honda CB1000.

== See also ==
- List of Yamaha motorcycles
