= Honda CB350 =

CB350
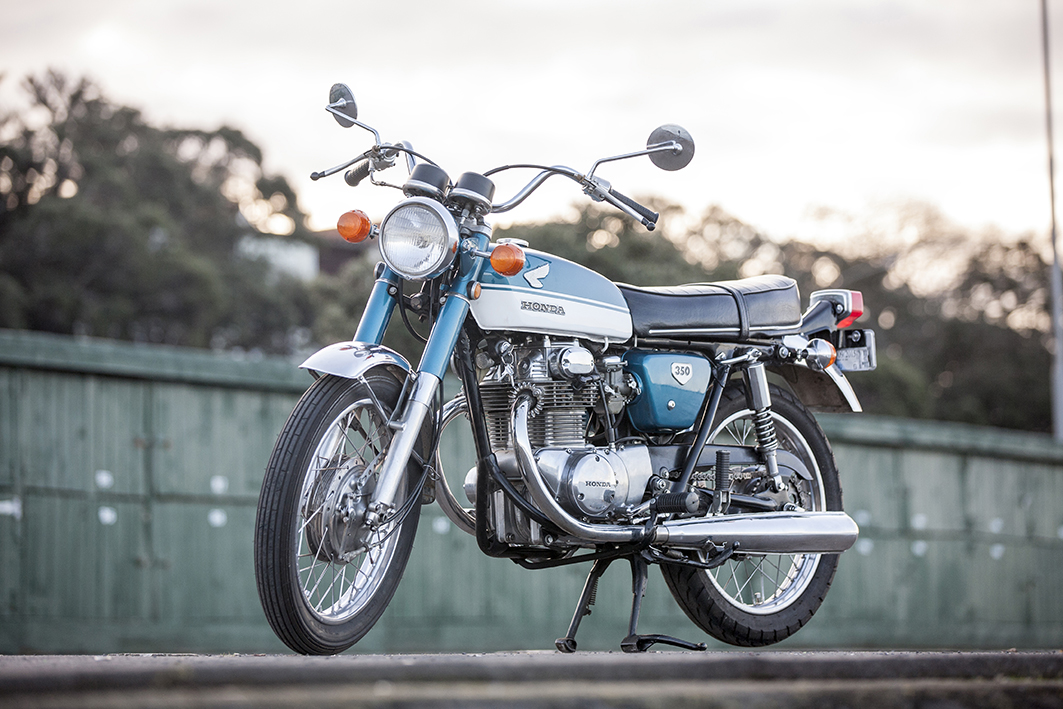
- 1970 CB350
- Manufacturer: Honda
- Also called: CB350 Super Sport
- Production: 1968–1973
- Assembly: Japan
- Predecessor: Honda CB77
- Successor: Honda CB360
- Engine: 325.6 cc (19.87 cu in) OHC air-cooled 180° parallel twin,
- Bore / stroke: 64 mm × 50.6 mm (2.52 in × 1.99 in)
- Compression ratio: 9.5:1
- Top speed: 169 km/h (105 mph) (claimed)
- Power: 36 bhp (27 kW) @ 10,500 rpm
- Torque: 2.55 kg⋅m (25.0 N⋅m; 18.4 lbf⋅ft) @ 9,500 rpm
- Ignition type: Kick start, later electric
- Transmission: 5-speed chain drive manual
- Suspension: Front: telescopic fork Rear: swingarm
- Brakes: Front: drum (k5 disc); Rear: drum
- Tires: 3.00 in × 18 in (76 mm × 457 mm)
- Wheelbase: 1,300 mm (52 in)
- Dimensions: L: 2,040 mm (80.3 in); W: 770 mm (30.5 in)
- Weight: 149 kg (328 lb) (dry); 170.0 kg (374.8 lb) (wet)
- Fuel capacity: 10.0 L; 2.20 imp gal (2.64 US gal)
- Oil capacity: 1,900 ml (2 US qt)

The CB350 is a 325.6-cubic-centimetre (19.87 cu in) OHC parallel twin cylinder, four-stroke motorcycles produced by Honda for model years 1968 through 1973. With its reliable engine and dual Keihin carburetors, it became one of Honda's best-selling models. More than 250,000 were sold in five years, with 67,180 sold in 1972 alone. The CB350 evolved during its production run with cosmetic changes and improvements to the suspension and brakes.

Like its predecessor, the Honda Superhawk, the CB350 was also offered in scrambler form, as the Honda CL350, with high-mounted exhausts and a 19-inch front wheel, and as the Honda SL350, with upswept exhausts and off-road styling.

In 1974 the Honda CB360 twin replaced the CB350 but was only available for two years. Note: The four-cylinder CB350F, introduced in 1972, was a completely different model.

In 2020 the Honda H'ness CB350 was released in India.

== New generation ==
On 30 September 2020, Honda launched the new CB350 with a new engine, new designs and new alloy wheels in India, through select Honda Dealerships. Deliveries of the Honda CB350 started on 17 October 2020. It also featured LED round headlights, dual horns, LED taillights, Bluetooth connectivity and a hazard light switch. It came with two variants: DLX and DLX Pro. Variants of the model were later launched in the UK, Australia, and Japan. In those markets it is sold under model numbers beginning with GB350 rather than CB350. On 16 November 2020, the Honda CB350 surpassed 1,000 deliveries in India.

== Gallery ==
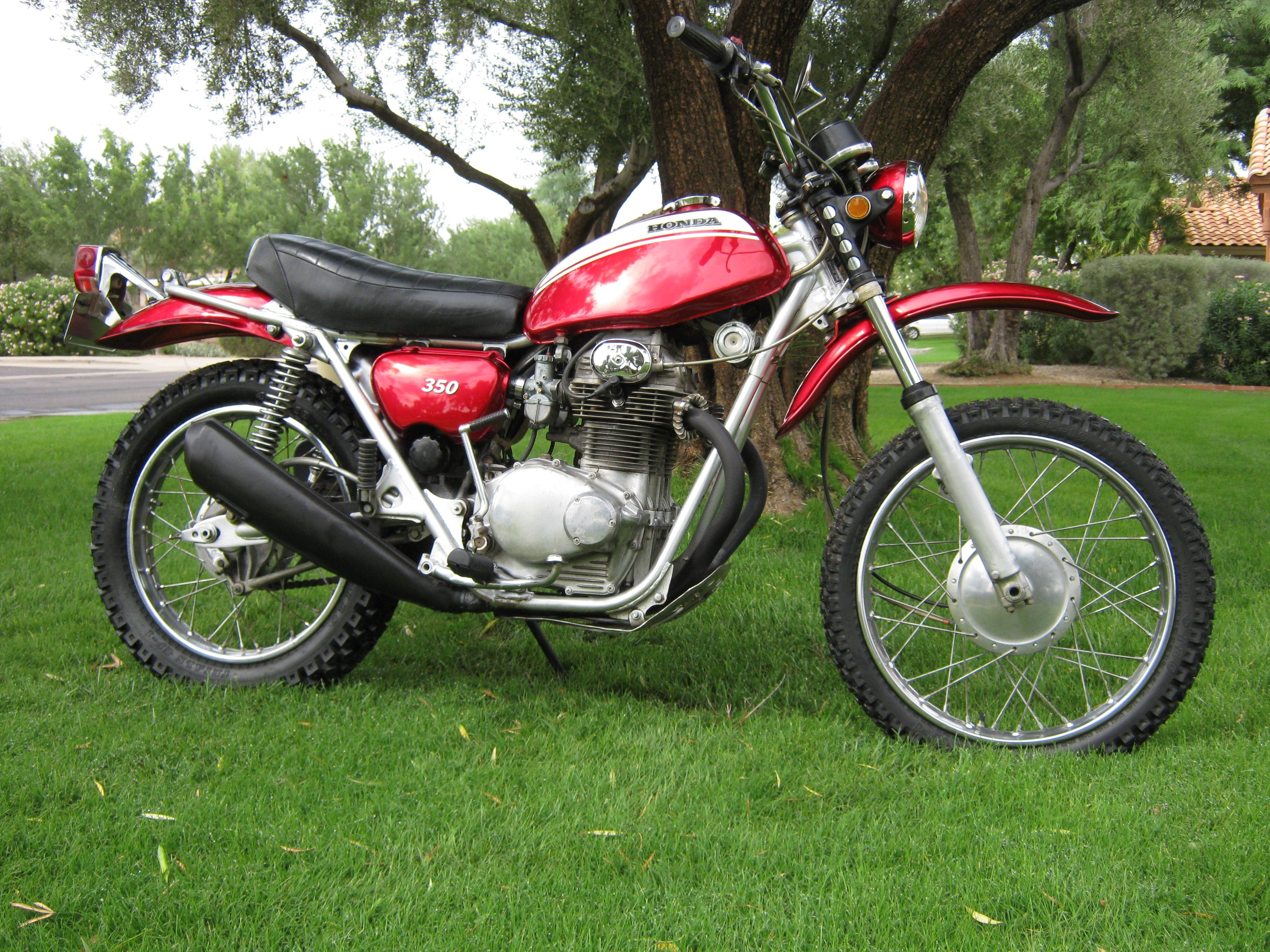
1971 Honda SL350 (1971)

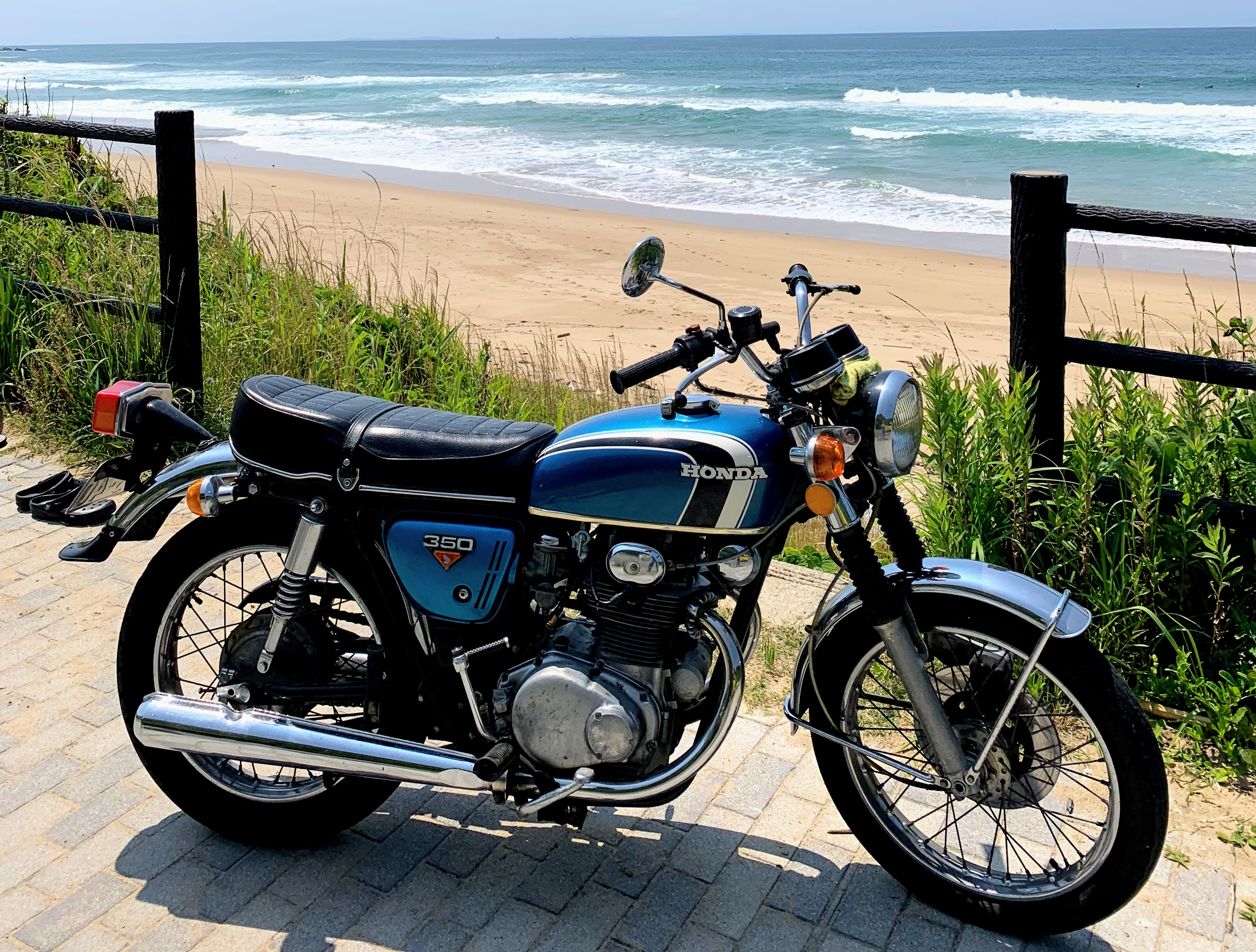
1973 Honda CB350G (1973)

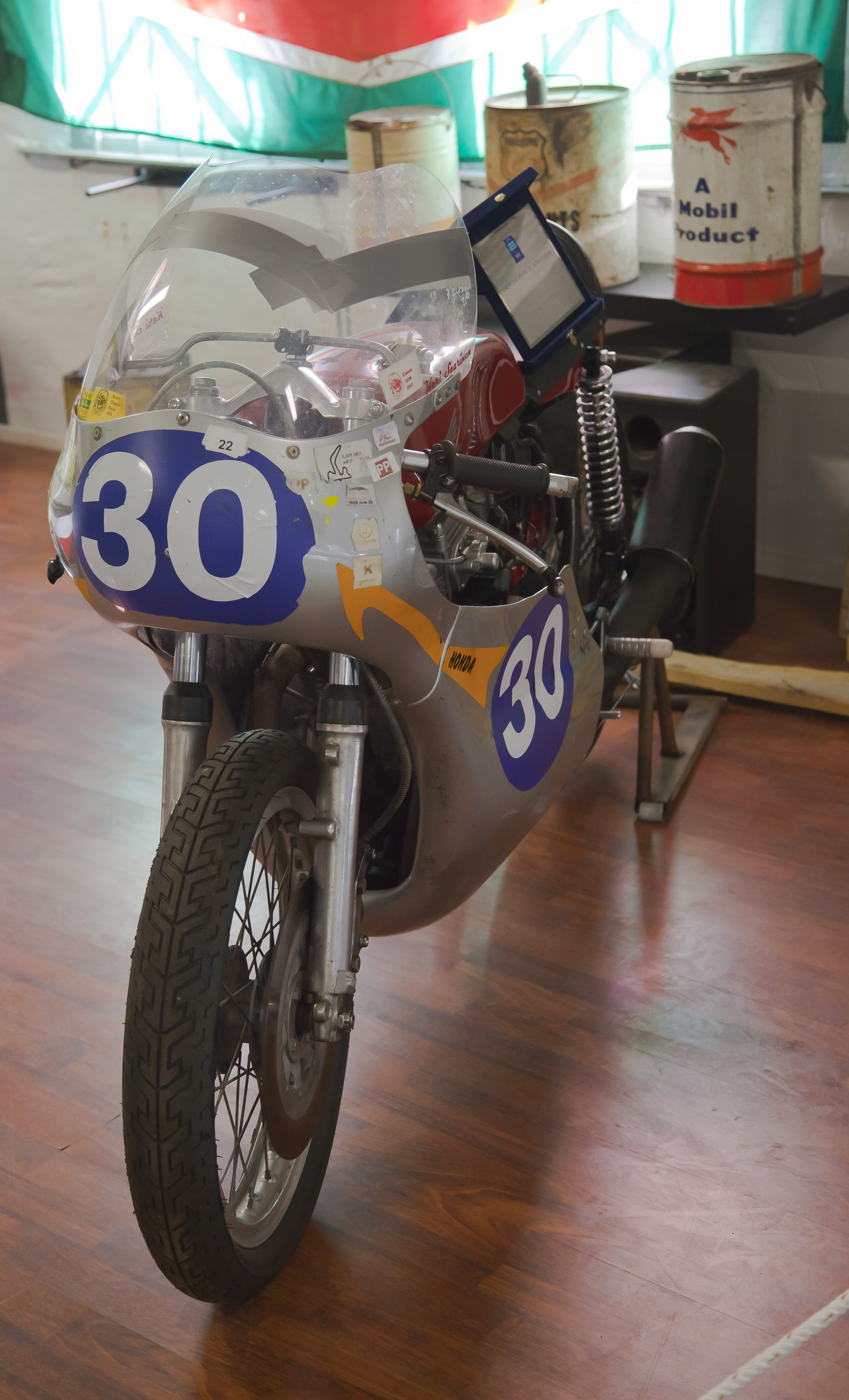
Racing Honda CB350K4 (1972)
