= Honda Superhawk =

Two very different Honda motorcycles are commonly referred to as the Superhawk in various parts of the world.

- The Honda CB77 Superhawk was a 305 cc, 28 horsepower (21 kW) parallel twin made in the '60s.
- The Honda VTR1000F Superhawk was a 996 cc, 100 horsepower (75 kW) V-twin introduced in the '90s.
