= Honda CB350F =

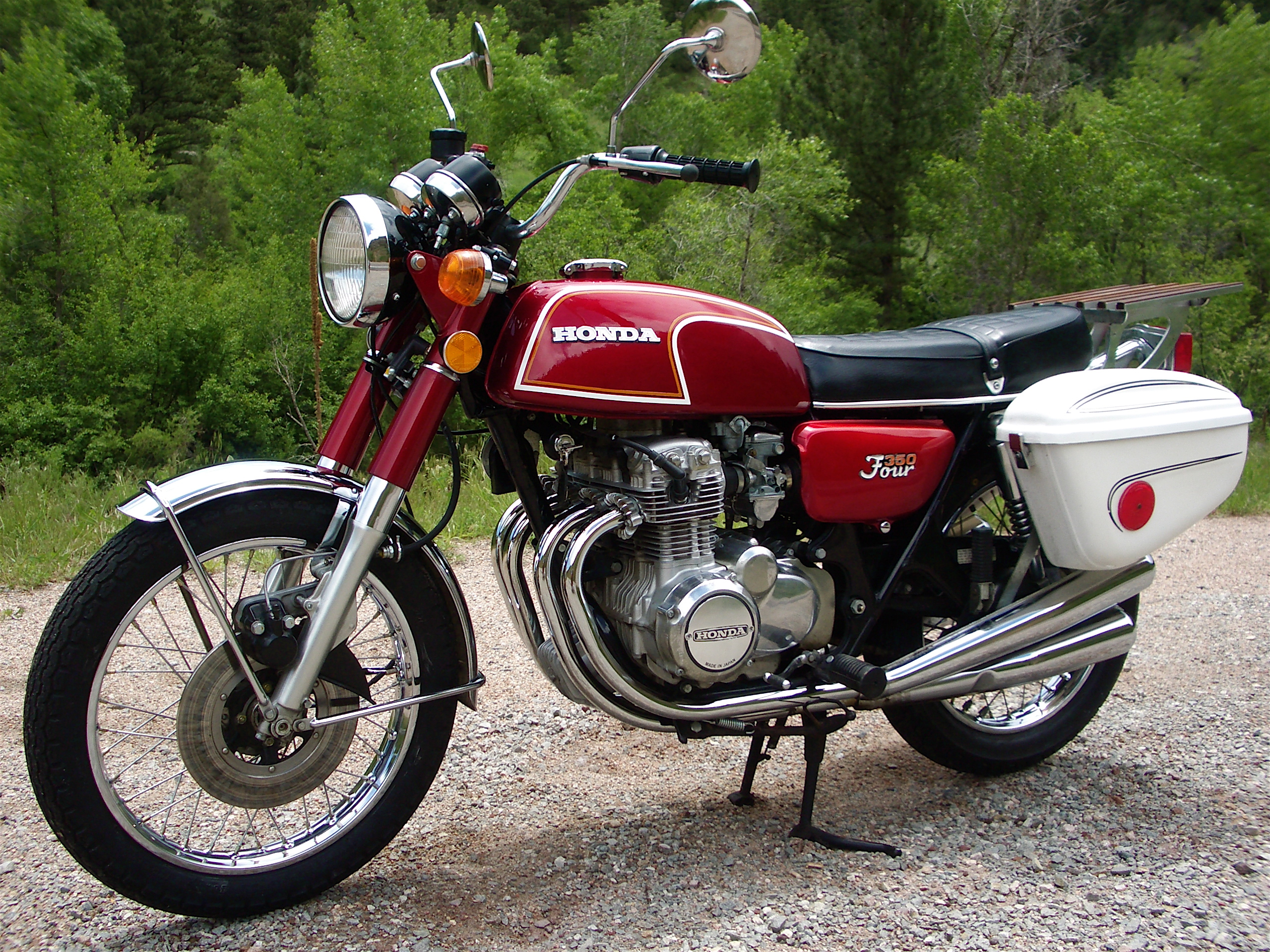
- Honda CB350F
- Manufacturer: Honda
- Production: 1972–1974
- Successor: CB400F
- Class: Standard
- Engine: 347 cc (21.2 cu in), SOHC, four-stroke, four
- Compression ratio: 9.3:1
- Top speed: 98 mph (158 km/h)
- Power: 34 hp at 10,000rpm
- Ignition type: Coil and breaker points
- Transmission: 5-speed chain drive manual
- Suspension: Front: telescopic fork Rear: twin shocks and adjustable preload
- Brakes: Front: single 10 in (250 mm) disc Rear: 6 in (150 mm) SLS drum
- Tires: Front: 3 x 18 in Rear: 3.5 x 18 in
- Wheelbase: 53.3 in (1,350 mm)
- Seat height: 31 in (790 mm)
- Weight: 373 lb (169 kg) (dry)
- Fuel capacity: 12.1 L (3.2 US gal)
- Fuel consumption: 40–60 mpg

The Honda CB350F is a four-cylinder, four-stroke, 347 cc (21.2 cu in) motorcycle based on the larger versions of the day (CB750, CB500). The motorcycle was manufactured by Honda in Japan from 1972 to 1974. At the time, the CB350F was the smallest capacity four cylinder motorcycle ever to enter into full-scale production. There were no changes to the 1973 model, but Honda designated the 1974 bike the CB350F1.

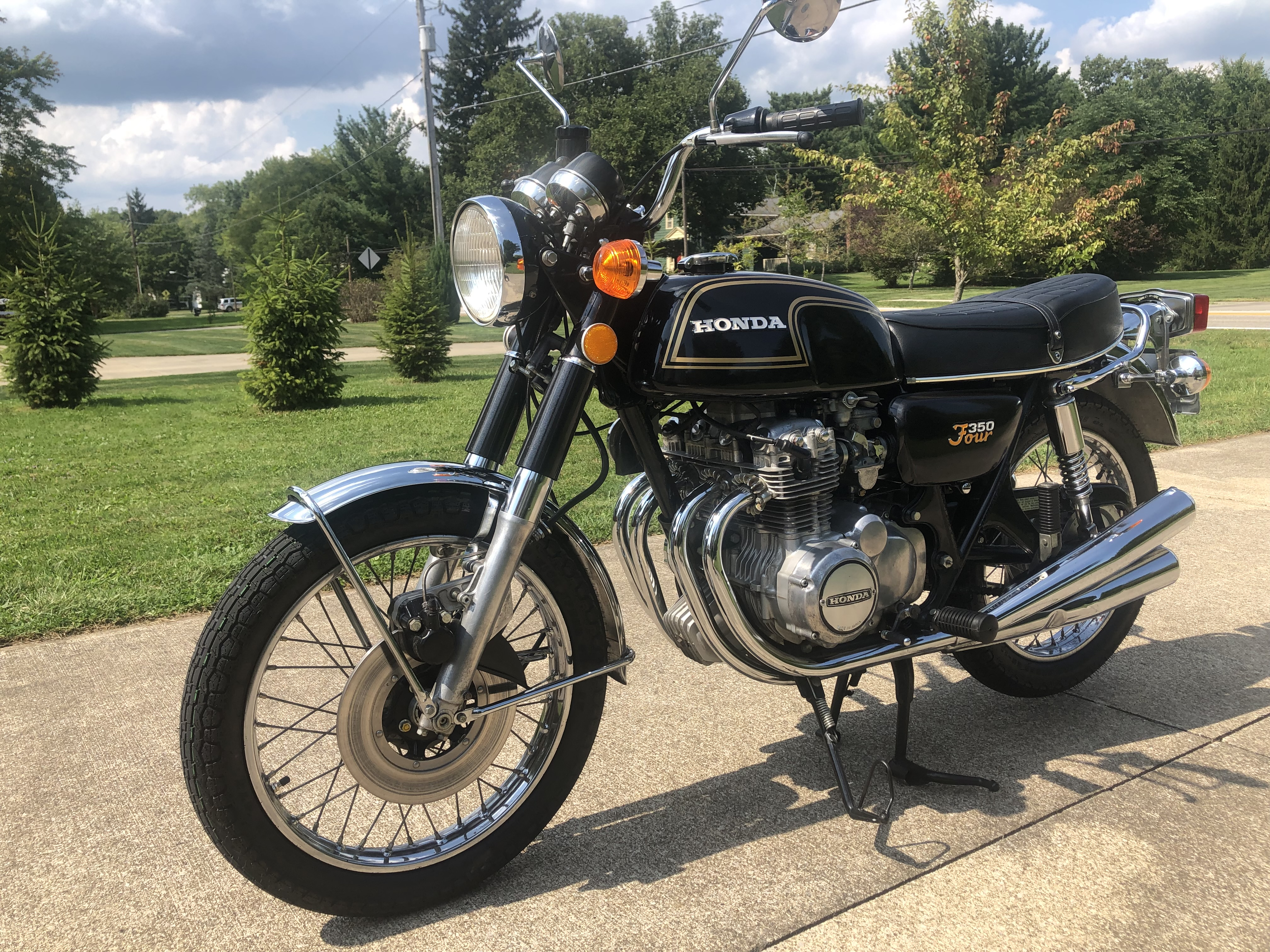
A stock 1974 Honda CB350F1 Four

Soon after production was discontinued, it was replaced by the CB400F. Although Honda had a 350 Twin that critics said was more powerful, lighter, and cheaper, many felt the 350 Four was faster and smoother running.
