= Engine control unit =

Computer that adjusts electronics in an internal combustion propulsion system

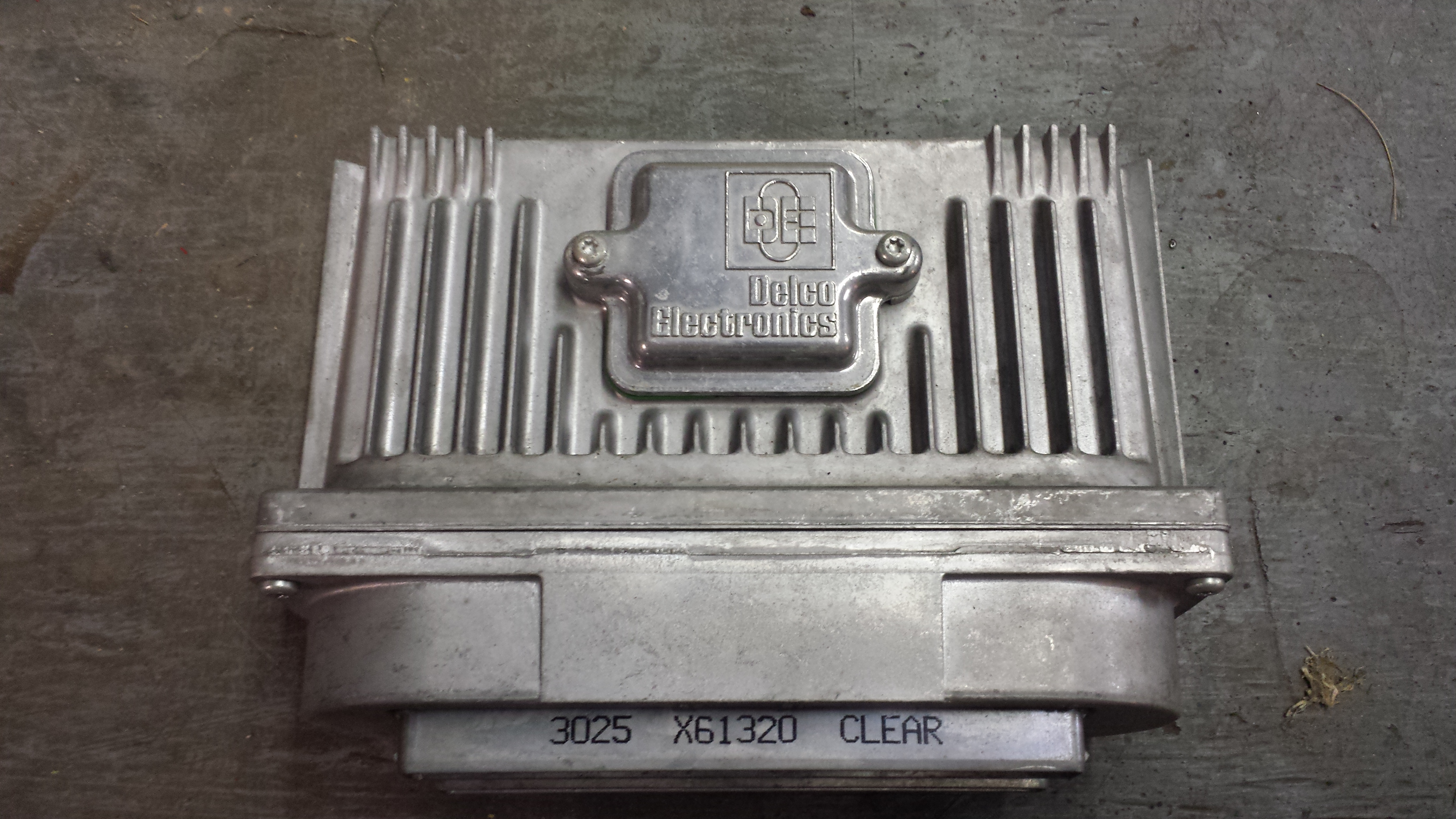
Delco ECU used in General Motors vehicles built in 1996

An engine control unit (ECU), also called an engine control module (ECM), is a device that controls various subsystems of an internal combustion engine. Systems commonly controlled by an ECU include the fuel injection and ignition systems.

The earliest ECUs (used by aircraft engines in the late 1930s) were mechanical-hydraulic units; however, most 21st-century ECUs operate using digital electronics.

== Functions ==
The main functions of the ECU are typically:

- Fuel injection system
- Ignition system
- Idle speed control (typically either via an idle air control valve, via spark advance or the electronic throttle system)
- Variable valve timing and/or variable valve lift systems

The sensors used by the ECU include:

- accelerator pedal position sensor
- camshaft position sensor
- coolant temperature sensor
- crankshaft position sensor
- knock sensors
- manifold absolute pressure sensor (MAP sensor)
- intake air temperature sensor
- intake air mass flow rate sensor (MAF sensor)
- oxygen (lambda) sensor
- throttle position sensor
- wheel speed sensor

=== Secondary ===
Other functions include:

- Launch control
- Fuel pressure regulator
- Rev limiter
- Wastegate control and anti-lag
- Theft prevention by blocking ignition, in response to input from an immobiliser

In a camless piston engine (an experimental design not currently used in any production vehicles), the ECU has continuous control of when each of the intake and exhaust valves are opened and by how much.

== Early systems ==
One of the earliest attempts to use such a unitised and automated device to manage multiple engine control functions simultaneously was created by BMW in 1939 Kommandogerät system used by the BMW 801 14-cylinder radial engine which powered the Focke-Wulf Fw 190 V5 fighter aircraft. This device replaced the six controls used to initiate hard acceleration with one control; however, the system could cause surging and stalling problems.

== Use in motor vehicles ==
In the early 1970s, the Japanese electronics industry began producing integrated circuits and microcontrollers for controlling engines. The Ford EEC (Electronic Engine Control) system, which used the Toshiba TLCS-12 microprocessor, entered mass production in 1975.

The first Bosch engine management system was the Motronic 1.0, which was introduced in the 1979 BMW 7 Series (E23). This system was based on the existing Bosch Jetronic fuel injection system, to which control of the ignition system was added.

In 1981, a Delco Electronics ECU was used by several Chevrolet and Buick engines to control their fuel system (a closed-loop carburetor) and ignition system. By 1988, Delco Electronics was the leading producer of engine management systems, producing over 28,000 ECUs per day.

== Use in aircraft engines ==
Such systems are used for many internal combustion engines in other applications. In aeronautical applications, the systems are known as FADECs (Full Authority Digital Engine Controls). This kind of electronic control is less common in piston-engined light fixed-wing aircraft and helicopters than in automobiles. This is due to the common configuration of a carbureted engine with a magneto ignition system that does not require electrical power generated by an alternator to run, which is considered a safety advantage.

== See also ==
- Air-fuel ratio meter
- Check engine light
- List of auto parts
- On-board diagnostics (OBD)
- Powertrain control module (PCM)
