= Idle air control actuator =

Vehicle device controlling engines

An idle air control actuator or idle air control valve (IAC actuator/valve) is a device commonly used in fuel-injected vehicles to control the engine's idling rotational speed (RPM). In carburetted vehicles a similar device known as an idle speed control actuator is used.

== Description ==
The IAC actuator is an electronically controlled device, which gets its input from the vehicle's engine control unit (ECU). The actuator is fitted such that it either bypasses the throttle or operates the throttle butterfly valve directly. The actuator consists of a linear servo actuator servomotor that controls a plunger which varies air flow through the throttle body. The position of the servomotor and hence the amount of air bypass is controlled digitally by the engine ECU. This allows the engine's idle speed to be maintained constant. The linear servo is most commonly a combination of a DC motor, lead screw and a digital optical encoder.

There is essentially no difference in efficiency between the technique of bypassing the throttle butterfly and operating the butterfly itself. The IAC allows the ECU to maintain minimum RPM irrespective of changes in engine load, sometimes referred to as anti-stall feature. Thus the driver can more easily move the car from stand-still by merely releasing the clutch (manual transmission) or the brake (automatic transmission) without having to simultaneously press the accelerator.

== Problems with IAC ==
Although the IAC is supposed to last the vehicle's lifetime, various reasons may cause it to fail/malfunction prematurely. The most common failure mode is partial/complete jamming of the actuator (due to dirt/dust or even oil) where it cannot be smoothly controlled. The result is an engine that fails to maintain idle RPM and frequently stalls. A jammed actuator may be freed simply by cleaning it. However an actuator that has stopped working due to a fault in its servomotor will need replacement.

Air leaks in either the stepper housing or pipes will cause an elevated idle RPM.
