= Yamaha XJR400 =

XJR 400
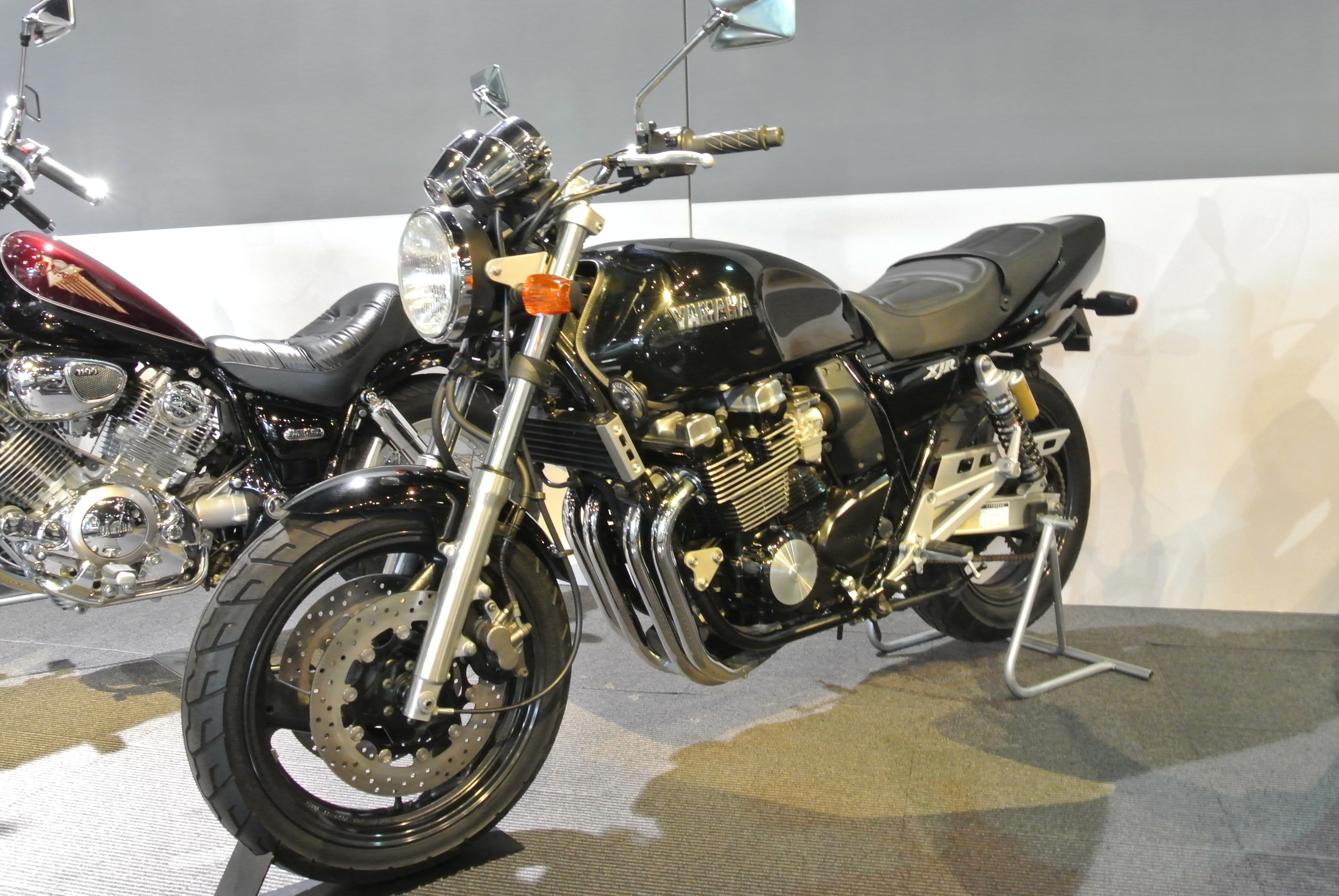
- Manufacturer: Yamaha
- Production: 1993–2007
- Class: Naked bike
- Engine: 399 cc (24.3 cu in) Air-cooled, inline 4 cylinder, BSR30×4 carburetors, DOHC H501E engine
- Bore / stroke: 55 mm × 42 mm (2.17 in × 1.65 in)
- Compression ratio: 10.7: 1
- Top speed: 180 km / h
- Power: 53 hp (40 kW) @ 11000 rpm
- Torque: 35 Nm @ 9500 rpm
- Transmission: 6-speed
- Frame type: Steel Tubular
- Suspension: Front Telescopic forks, ÖHLINS Rear Dual shocks preload adjustable.
- Brakes: 2 Piston Caliper 1993 - 1994, 2 disc front, 1 disc rear Brembo 4 Piston Caliper 1996 - 1999, 2 disc front, 1 disc rear Nissin Sumitomo 4 Piston Caliper 2001 - 2007, 2 disc front, 1 disc rear
- Tires: Front: 110/70ZR-17M/C (54W); Rear: 150/70ZR-17M/C (69W)
- Rake, trail: 26°00 ‘/99mm
- Wheelbase: 1,435mm
- Dimensions: L: 2,085mm W: 735mm H: 1,085mm
- Seat height: 780mm
- Weight: 175kg (dry); 195kg (1993–1997) 198kg (1998–2007) (wet)
- Fuel capacity: 18L Including reserved 3L 1993–1997 20L 1998–2007
- Oil capacity: 2.8L
- Related: Yamaha XJR1200

The Yamaha XJR400 4HM is a motorcycle manufactured by Yamaha. It is a sports naked bike with a maximum power output of 53ps at 11,000RPM. The XJR400 was built from 1993 until it was discontinued in 2007 due to stricter emissions regulation.

== Model history ==
As the era of Naked Bikes arrived in the early 1990s, Yamaha was behind the trend and wanted to keep up with their competitors. With the arrival of the Kawasaki Zephyr, Yamaha based their benchmarks on the renowned motorcycle and the result was a 399cc oil-cooled sports naked motorcycle, the XJR400.

=== 1993–1996 Early 4HM ===
1993 XJR400 Yamaha introduced the first variant of the XJR400, it came with x4 Mikuni BSR30 carburetors integrated to its 64-degree DOHC 16-valve oil-cooled 399cc inline 4 engine tuned for 53 horsepower. It is mated with a close-ratio 6 speed transmission that gives a "turning number" flavor.

1994 XJR400S A limited run of 4000 units were called the S model and had rear Öhlins suspension that became standard and a trademark to the XJR lineup.

1995 XJR400R The model officially changed its name to XJR400R, the internal components such as the pistons and connecting rods were strengthened and other parts such as the ignition control and muffler were changed. This year, XJR models are now equipped with gold 4 piston Brembo calipers at the front and the rear Öhlins suspension springs are now yellow.

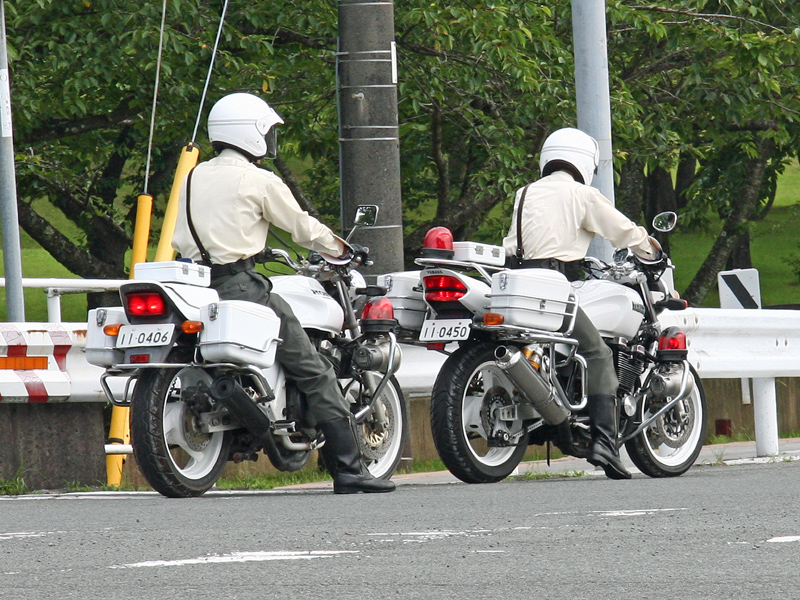
Japanese Police XJR400 2007 (right) together with a Honda CB400 (left)

1996 XJR400R2 A limited edition came with a headlight cowl and a rectangular headlight, a digital instrument panel, the seat was enhanced and is called low-resilience Wylux seat which lowered the seat height by 10mm. Lastly, its muffler is recolored to a matte black color. Unfortunately, this model did not garner much popularity as it was released the same time Honda unveiled the Version R variant of the CB400 Super Four.

A standard version is also released in the same year together with the limited edition with a black exhaust system but follows the same specifications as the 1995 version.

=== 1998 Mid 4HM ===
1998 XJR400R Following the R model, in this year the 2nd generation of the R variant is released and came with a bigger tank with increased fuel capacity by 2L, fork guards, redesigned rear end, digital instrument panel and seat while also changing the engine paint color from black to silver.

=== 2001–2007 Final Stage 4HM ===
2001 The last generation of the R model, its wheels, swingarm and muffler were redesigned and came with a MOS (monoblock) 4 piston Nissin Sumitomo calipers derived from the Yamaha Flagship motorcycle, YZF-R1 (1998–2001). It also had minor changes to its seat and mirrors.

2004 Minor revisions were done to the muffler interior and ignition system to meet noise regulations which also granted better low to mid acceleration performance. An immobilizer was also installed and its instrument panel was swapped for the XJR1300 model.

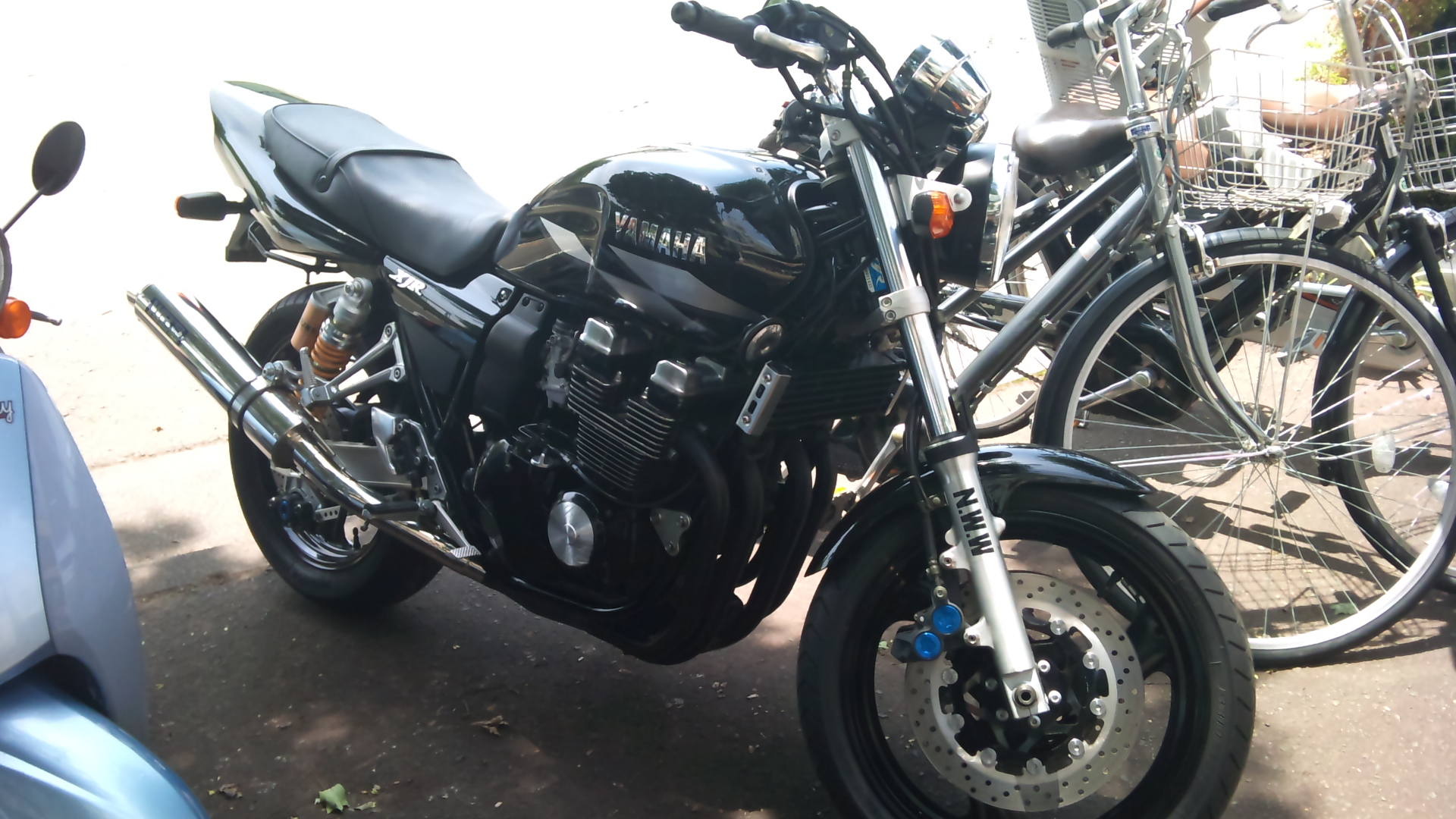
XJR400R Final Variant (2007)

2007 The last model of the XJR400R had oval side mirrors and pinstripe decals, this is the last variant before it was discontinued due to the stricter gas emissions. Air-cooled motorcycles such as the XJR400 struggled to meet the requirements as air-cooled bikes require more fuel load to cool down the engine which released a larger amount of pollution compared to liquid-cooled motorcycles, thus did not meet the standards.
