= Honda CB400F =

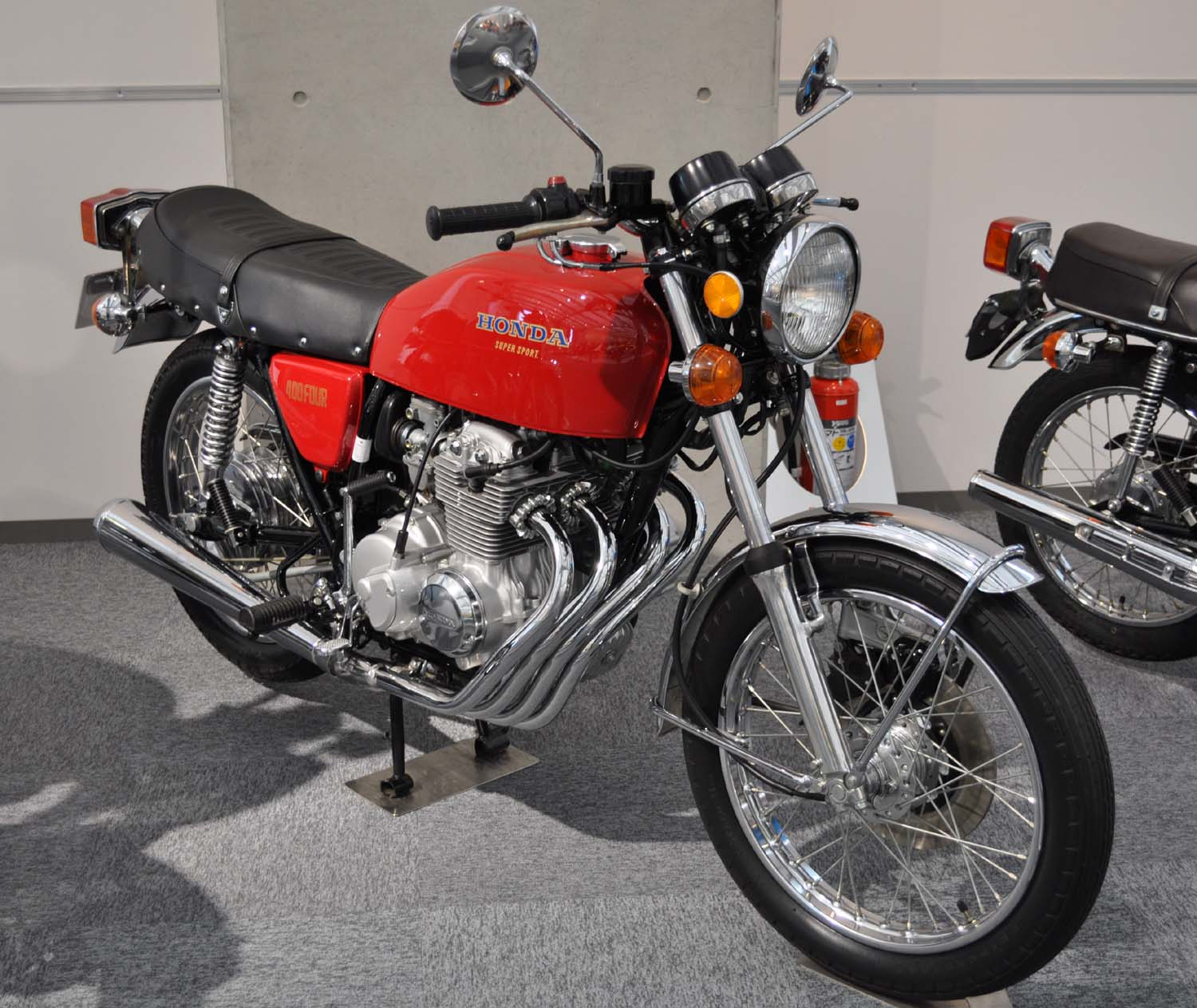
- Manufacturer: Honda
- Also called: Honda Dream CB400 Four
- Production: 1975–1977
- Predecessor: Honda CB350F
- Successor: Honda CBX400F; Honda CB400 Super Four
- Class: Standard
- Engine: 408 cc (24.9 cu in), Air-cooled, inline-4-cylinder, sohc
- Bore / stroke: 51 mm (2.0 in) x 50 mm (2.0 in)
- Compression ratio: 9.4:1
- Top speed: 103.8 mph (167.0 km/h)
- Power: 37 bhp (28 kW) @ 8,500 rpm
- Torque: 24 lb⋅ft (33 N⋅m) @ 7,500 rpm
- Ignition type: Inductive discharge ignition; electric and kick start
- Transmission: 6-speed, manual, chain final drive
- Frame type: Tubular single downtube cradle
- Suspension: Front: telescopic forks Rear: swingarm with two spring/shock units
- Brakes: front hydraulic disc; rear expanding drum
- Tyres: 3.00 x 18 front; 3.50 x 18 rear
- Rake, trail: 26.5° 85 mm (3.35 in)
- Weight: 178 kg (392 lb) (with 1 imp gal (4.5 L; 1.2 US gal) of fuel) (wet)

The Honda CB400F is a motorcycle produced by Honda from 1975 to 1977. It first appeared at the 1974 Cologne motorcycle show, Intermot, and was dropped from the Honda range in 1978. It had an air-cooled, transverse-mounted 408 cc (24.9 cu in) inline four-cylinder engine with two valves per cylinder operated by a single chain-driven overhead camshaft. Fuelling was provided by four 20 mm Keihin carburettors. The CB400F is commonly known as the Honda 400 Four.

== Background ==
After introducing the four-cylinder CB750 motorcycle in 1969, Honda followed with a string of smaller-capacity four-cylinder models; the CB500 Four in 1971 and the CB350 Four in 1972. The CB350F was available for two years until Honda announced the CB400F model.

For the most part, the CB400F was simply an upgraded version of the 350 model from the previous year. At the time Honda's R&D department had devoted much of its resources towards automobile models such as the Civic. This meant that motorbike development was limited to mechanical changes. In order to develop the CB350F into the CB400F, Honda increased the bore and modified the cylinder head to raise the compression ratio. In a first for Honda, a sixth ratio was fitted to the gearbox. Instead of aping the styling of the bigger Universal Japanese Motorcycle (UJM) style CB750, like the 350F had, the CB400F had a more café racer look with lower handle bars, rear set footpegs and more svelte styling. It also gained one its most recognisable attributes, a swooping four-into-one exhaust system.

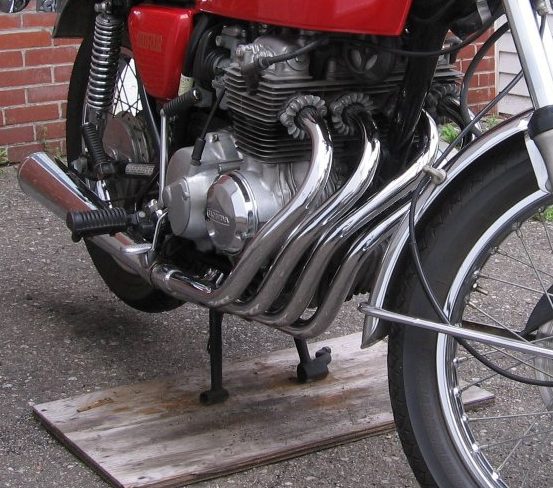
CB400F with distinctive four-into-one factory-original exhaust system

Although aimed at the sporting segment of the market, the four-stroke CB400F did not have the acceleration of the competition's two-strokes, particularly the triples from Kawasaki. But what the CB400F engine lacked in power it made up for in refinement, the small-displacement four-stroke being smoother, quieter and much more economical than the two-strokes.

== Reception ==
The CB400F was well received by the motoring press and reviewers. They praised its renewed focus over the previous 350F model, preferring its clean lines and sporty café racer looks. In America, however, the CB400F was not the sales success Honda had anticipated. Honda revised the model in the US in an attempt to recapture lost sales by fitting higher bars and footpegs set further forward, but the CB400F struggled against the dominant Kawasaki twin-cylinder model. It was also 15% to 20% more expensive than its competition.

== Variants ==
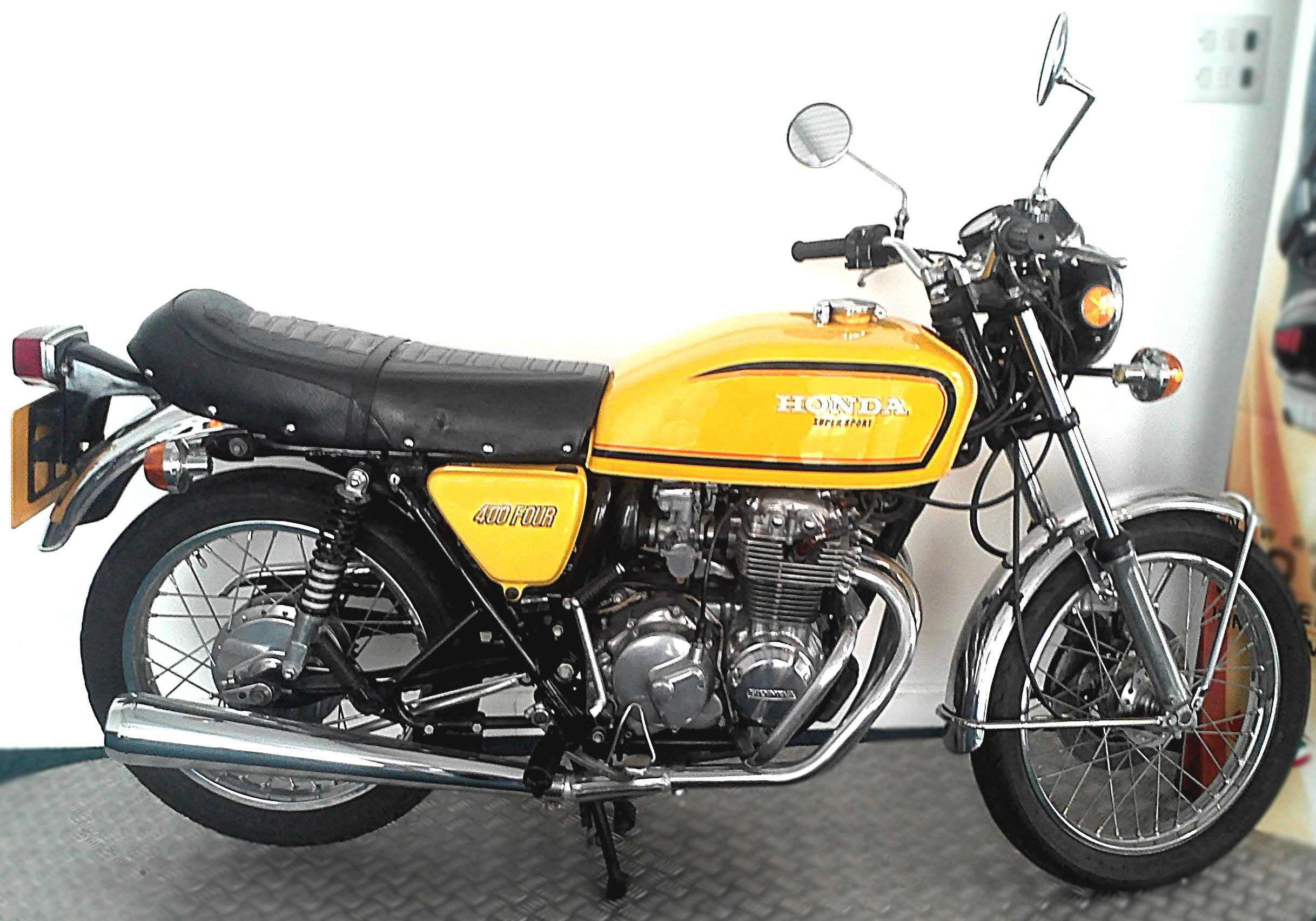
CB400F2 model

The CB400F was produced in three variants during its production cycle; the F, F1 and F2.

UK variants:

- 1975-1977: F Launch model had swingarm-mounted passenger footpegs and was available in Light Ruby Red or Varnish Blue. At some point during the run, passenger footpegs were moved to loops off of the rear subframe and a lock was added to the fuel filler cap.
- 1978: F2 Virtually the same as the earlier UK F model except for a minor restyled fuel tank and revised decals. This variant was available in Candy Antares Red and Parakeet Yellow. This is the final model year for the UK market.

US and Canadian variants:

- 1975: F 1st-year model was available in Light Ruby Red or Varnish Blue.
- 1976: F1 Released as a US and Canadian-only model, it was virtually identical to the earlier US/Canada F model except for revised colour schemes. Few F1 variants were exported to the United Kingdom. F1 models were available in Light Ruby Red or Parakeet Yellow, both with black side covers.
- 1977: F2 Higher bars were fitted and footrests were repositioned further forward to cater to consumer demand. This variant was available in Candy Antares Red and Parakeet Yellow with revised decals and matching side covers. It had a revised fuel tank with a recessed locking fuel cap cover. This is the final model year for the US and Canadian market.

All US/Canada models had swingarm-mounted passenger footpegs.

Longer cylinder head studs were fitted after engine number 1084315 to try to remedy the problem oil weeping from the head gasket.

To comply with licence restrictions in France and Japan, Honda also produced a 398 cc (24.3 cu in) version by fitting a shorter 48.8 mm (1.92 in) stroke crankshaft.

== Performance ==
The CB400F produced a claimed 37 bhp (28 kW) at 8,500 rpm and 24 lb⋅ft (33 N⋅m) at 7,500 rpm. Bike magazine reported a 0 to 1/4 mile (0 to 400 m) time of 14.68 seconds. During the same road test they recorded a top speed of 103.80 mph (167.05 km/h) prone and 93.5 mph (150.5 km/h) sitting up.

== Racing ==
The CB400F was somewhat successful motorcycle in club or privateer racing. Kaz Yoshima, a former employee at Honda's R&D department in Japan, built 492 cc (30.0 cu in) race versions capable of 13,500 rpm and producing an estimated 60 bhp (45 kW). Ron Haslam won the 1980 Formula 3 title on a CB400F prepared by Honda dealer Nettleton Motorcycles. He also came third in the F3 class at the Isle of Man TT on the same machine. Racing versions of the CB400F were also raced successfully in the Formula 2 under 500 cc four stroke/350 two-stroke class.

== Legacy ==
Around 105,000 CB400F units were sold. The CB400F was succeeded by the twin cylinder Honda CB400T. It wasn't until 1983 that Honda introduced another 400 cc inline-four, the all new CBR400 NC17. The 2006 PlayStation 2 title Tourist Trophy featured a CB400 Four as a prize for getting a gold 'Junior License'. In late 2011 a UK-based company, David Silver Spares, announced they would be acquiring used CB400Fs to restore and resell to the public. The aim was to use economies of scale to restore 49 CB400F bikes in batches. The project was featured by Classic Bike magazine in April 2012 and showcased the bike owned by Top Gear presenter James May.

== See also ==
- Honda CB400
