= Honda CB-1 =

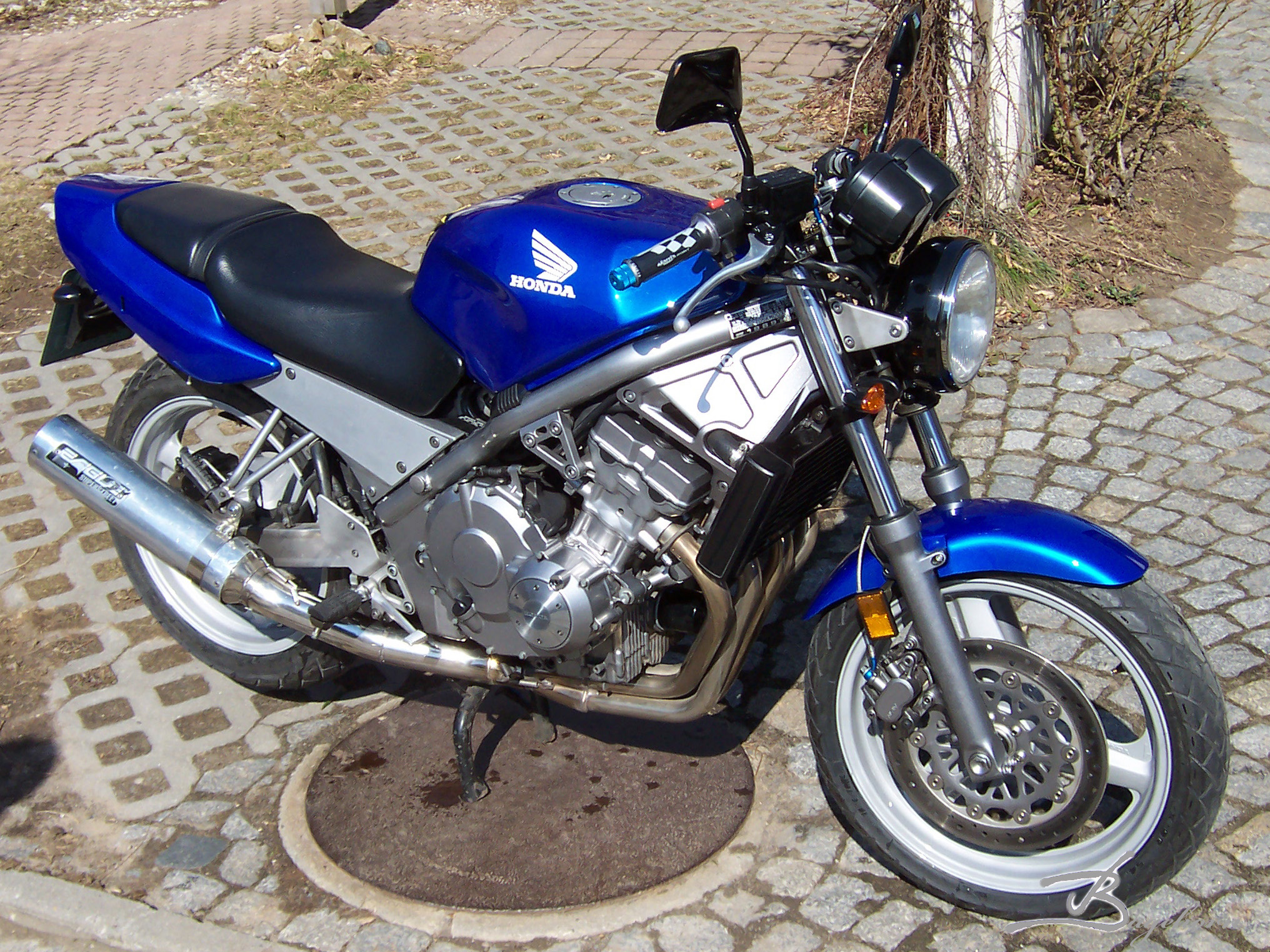
- Manufacturer: Honda
- Also called: CB400F, NC27
- Production: 1989–1990
- Predecessor: Honda CBX400F
- Successor: Honda CB400SF
- Class: Naked bike
- Engine: 399 cc (24.3 cu in) liquid cooled DOHC four valves/cyl. inline-four
- Bore / stroke: 55.0 mm × 42.0 mm (2.17 in × 1.65 in)
- Compression ratio: 11.3:1
- Top speed: 190 km/h (118 mph)
- Power: 55.2 bhp (41.2 kW) @ 10,000 rpm (claimed)
- Torque: 29 lb⋅ft (39 N⋅m) @ 9,500 rpm (claimed)
- Ignition type: electric starter
- Transmission: 6-speed chain drive manual
- Frame type: Steel perimeter
- Suspension: Showa. Front: 41 mm telescopic fork, non-adj. Rear: single shock w/7-way preload adj.
- Brakes: Single disc front/rear
- Tires: Bridgestone Front: 110/70-17; Rear: 140/70-17
- Rake, trail: 25.5 degrees, 99 mm (3.9 in)
- Wheelbase: 1,370 mm (54 in)
- Dimensions: L: 2,035 mm (80.1 in); W: 705 mm (27.8 in)
- Seat height: 775 mm (30.5 in)
- Weight: 179 kg (395 lb) (dry); 187 kg (413 lb) (wet)
- Fuel capacity: 3.3 US gal (12 L; 2.7 imp gal)
- Related: Honda CBR400

The Honda CB-1 is a small, light naked sports motorcycle with a 399-cubic-centimetre (24.3 cu in) straight-four engine, carrying the model code NC27. In contrast to other models of the Honda CB series, the name is written with a hyphen. In some countries it was marketed as Honda CB400F.

The bike was first introduced in 1989 and continued through 1990. Originally developed for the Japanese market, the CB-1 was also available in the United States and Canada. Called a "great motorcycle that never found an audience" and "victims of a difficult market" by Cycle World, the final model year 1990 CB-1s available as leftover stock were offered in 1992 at a $600 discount, for $3700 in the US, which in current money would be $8,489 accounting for inflation.

The CB-1 engine is similar to the early NC23 models CBR400RR, with changes to the port lengths and angles as well as smaller valves and lower compression ratio; changes in the primary and secondary gear ratios reduced the 60 mph (97 km/h) first gear down to around 30 mph (48 km/h), making the slightly less powerful CB-1 feel much quicker from a standstill than its sportier sibling, All engines derived from the NC23 block carry the NC23 ID code in the engine number; this includes the NC27, 23, 29, 31 etc., including the VTEC models with chain driven cams. Like many of its stablemates, the CB-1 has straight gear-driven dual camshafts with self-silencing gears to reduce whine.

Cycle World measured the time to cover a 1/4 mile (0.40 km) as 13.17 seconds with a final speed of 99.16 miles per hour (159.58 km/h) and the top speed as 118 miles per hour (190 km/h) Braking distance from 60 to 0 miles per hour (97 to 0 km/h) was 124 feet (38 m). — saying the bike was "a reincarnation of the standard motorcycle ... the sort of bike everyone rode before sporting riders went replica racer crazy".

== Gallery ==
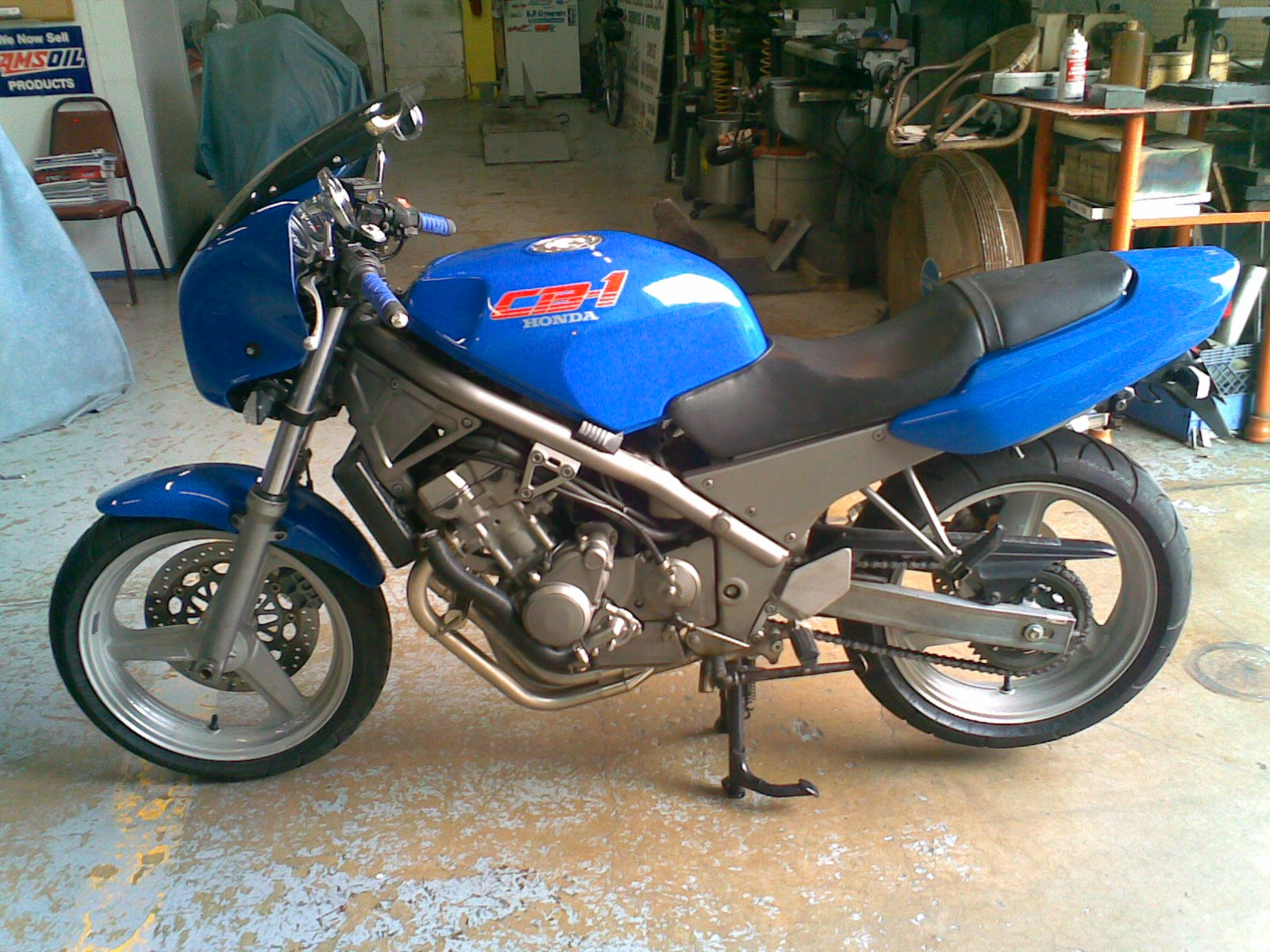
Honda CB1

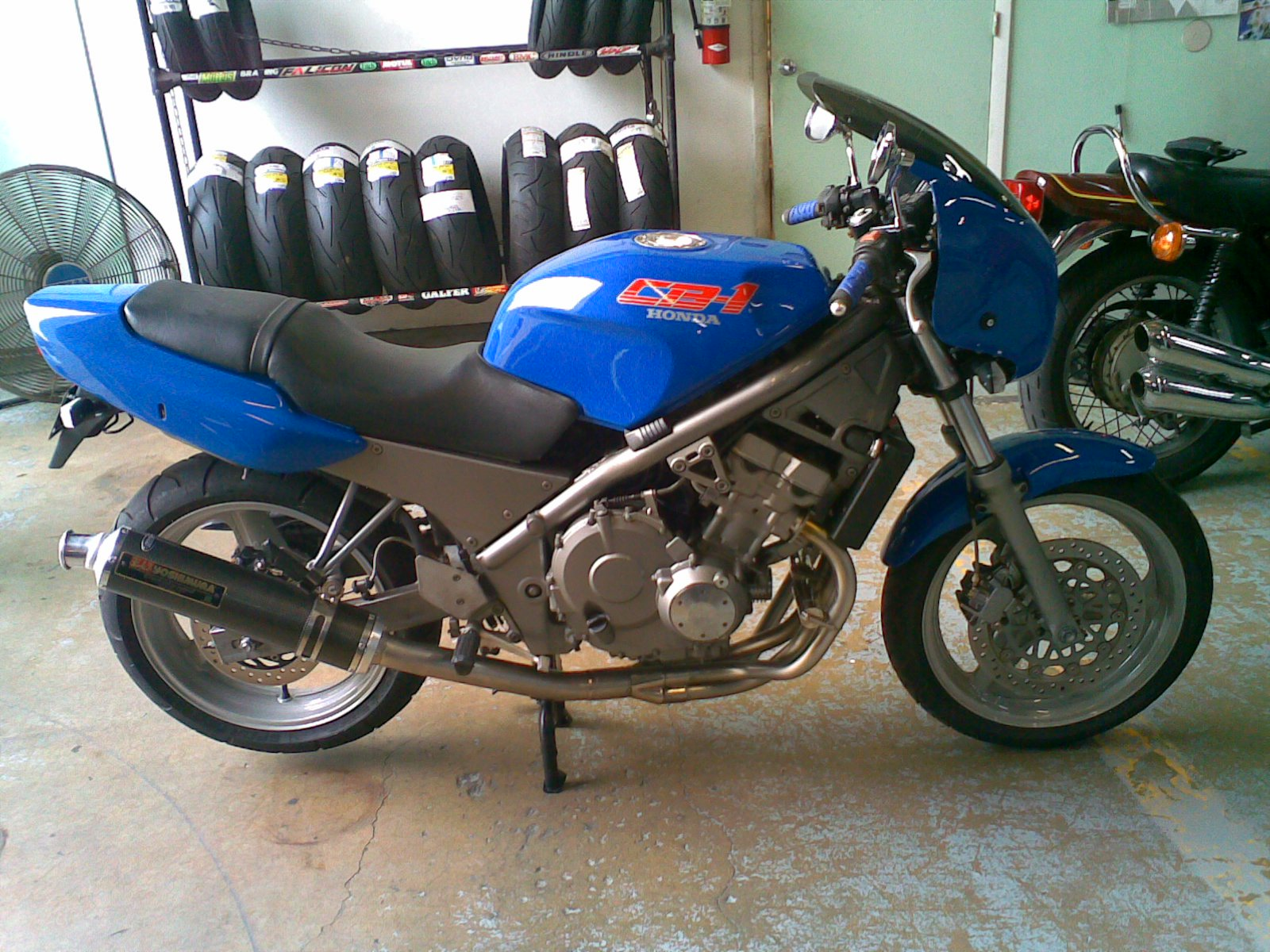
Honda CB1
