= Honda CB series =

Line of Honda motorcycles

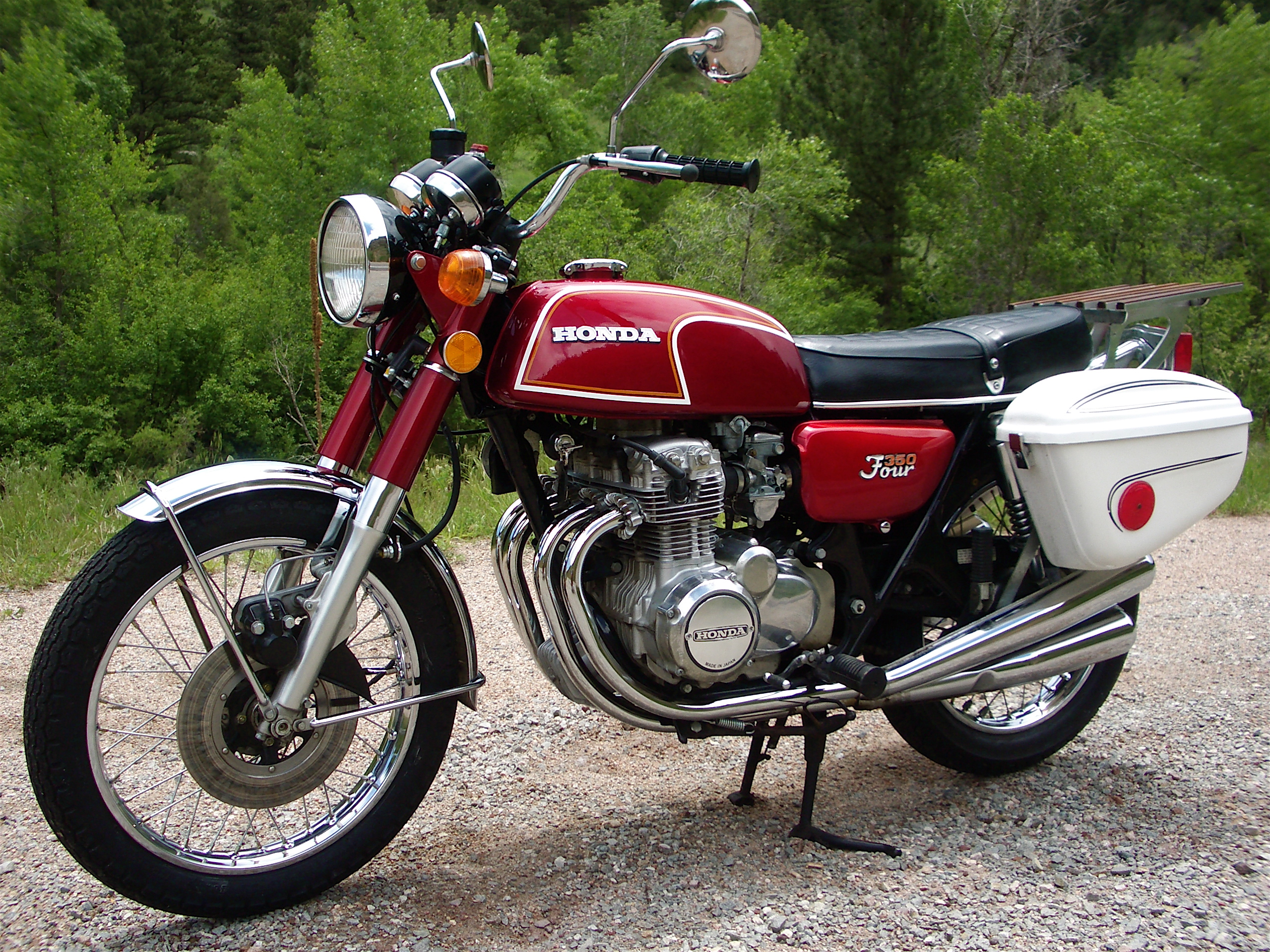
Honda CB350F

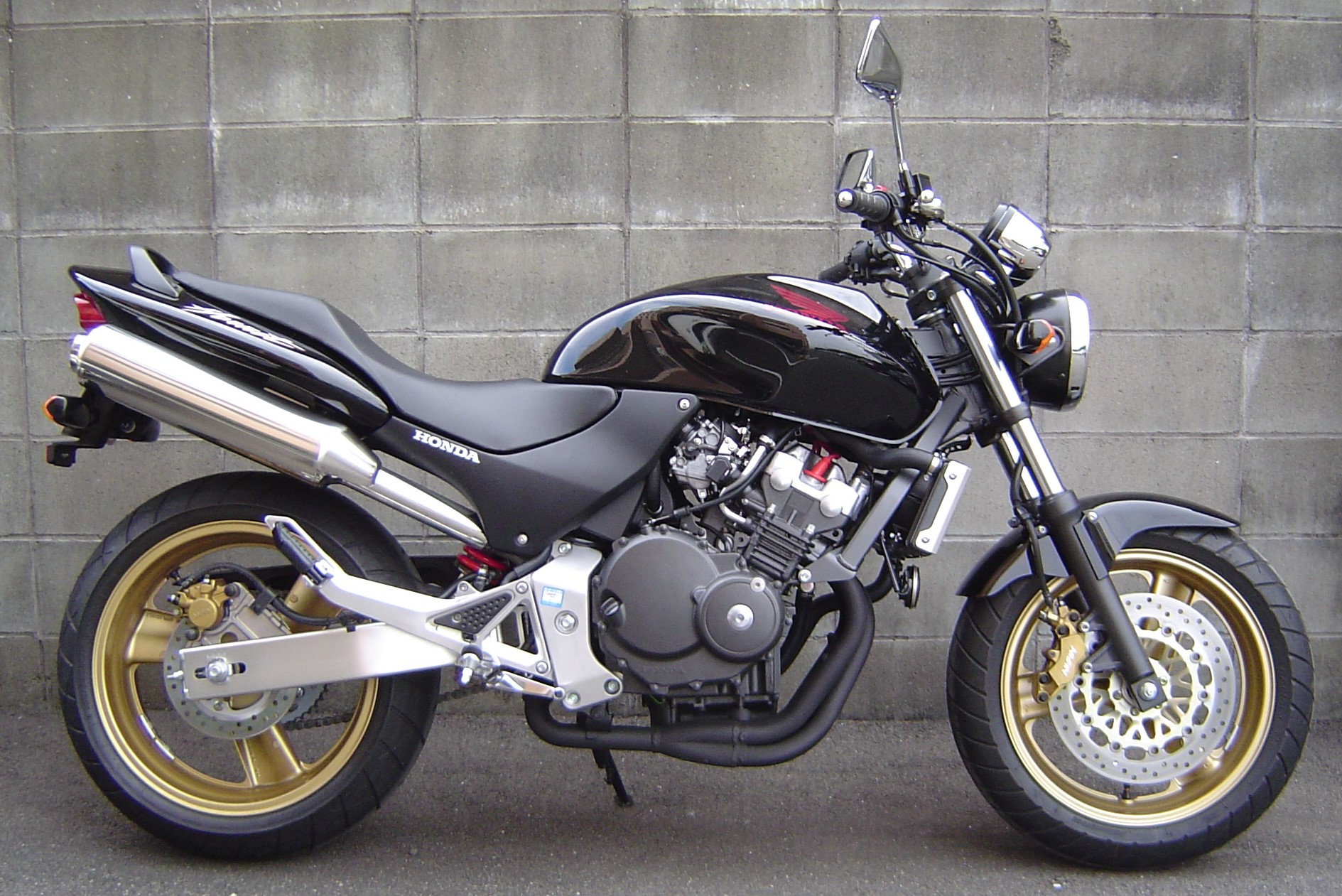
Honda Hornet 250

The Honda CB Series is an extensive line of Honda motorcycles. Most CB models are road-going motorcycles for commuting and cruising. The smaller CB models are also popular for vintage motorcycle racing.

== Honda CB series ==
- CB-1
- CB50
- CB50R
- CB77 Super Hawk
- CB90 Super Sport
- CB92 also known as Benly Super Sport
- CB100N
- CB100 Super Sport
- CB110 also known as CB Twister
- CB125
- CB125E
- CB125F
- CB125R
- CB125N
- CB125T
- CB125 Super Dream
- CB150 also known as CB Trigger
- CB150F
- CB150R
- CB150 Verza
- CB150 Invicta
- CB150X
- CB160 Super Sport
- CB175
- CB200
- CB200X
- CB250
- CB250 Dream
- CB250F
- CB250F Jade
- CB250N
- CB250R
- CB250RS
- CB250T
- CB300F
- CB300R
- CB350
- CB350F
- CB350 H'Ness (also known as CB350 RS, sold as GB350 in Japan and EU)
- CB360
- CB400F
- CB400F CB-1
- CB400N
- CB400T
- CB400X
- CB450
- CB450F
- CB450T
- CB450DX-K
- CB500
- CB500 (India)
- CB500F
- CB500 Four
- CB500T
- CB500X
- CB550
- CB600F
- CB650
- CB650F
- CB650R
- CB750
- CB750K
- CB750 Custom
- CB900F
- CB900 Custom
- CB1000F
- CB1000R
- CB1000GT
- CB1000 Custom
- CB1100
- CB1100F
- CB1100R
- CB1100SF

== Honda Super Four ==
- CB400 Super Four
- CB500 Super Four
- CB1000 Super Four
- CB1300 Super Four

== Honda Hornet ==
- CB125 Hornet
- CB Hornet 160R
- Hornet 2.0 (CB200)
- CB250 Hornet
- CB500 Hornet
- CB600 Hornet
- CB750 Hornet
- CB900 Hornet
- CB1000 Hornet

== Honda Nighthawk ==
- CB250 Nighthawk
- CB450 Nighthawk
- CB550 Nighthawk
- CB650 Nighthawk
- CB700 Nighthawk
- CB750 Nighthawk

== Gallery ==
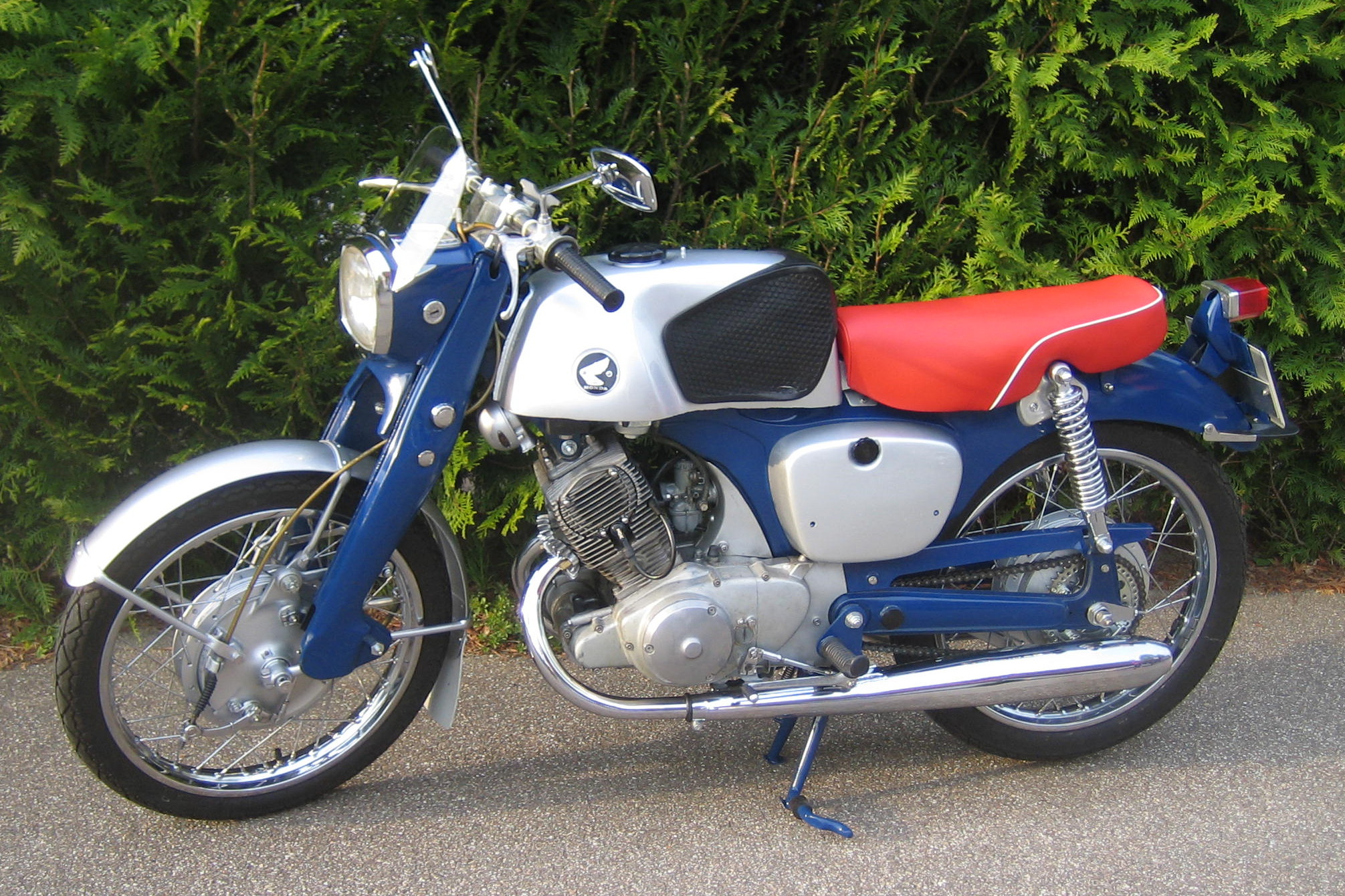
1965 CB92 "Benly"

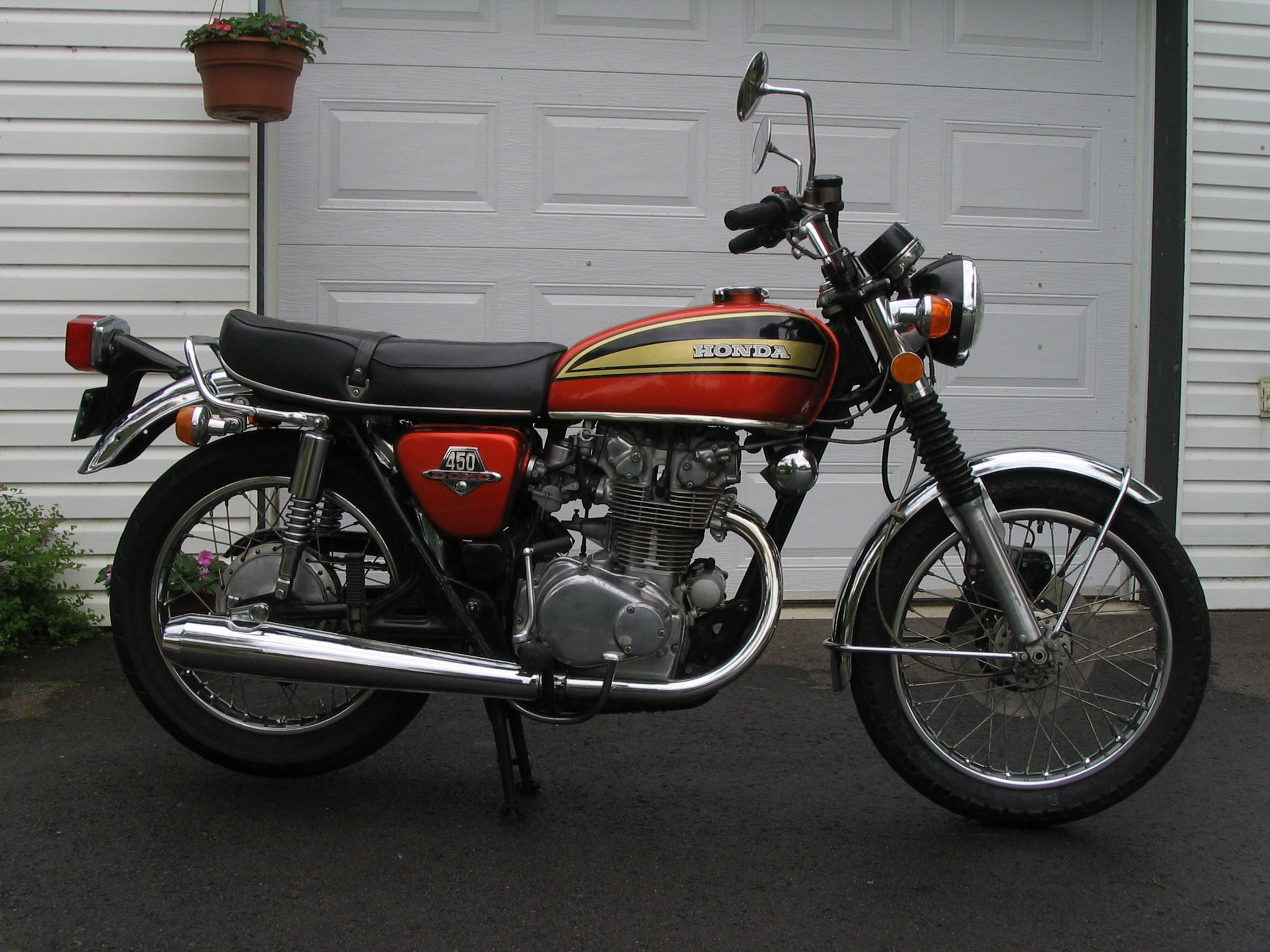
CB 450 "DOHC", the model with the highest capacity engine until 1969

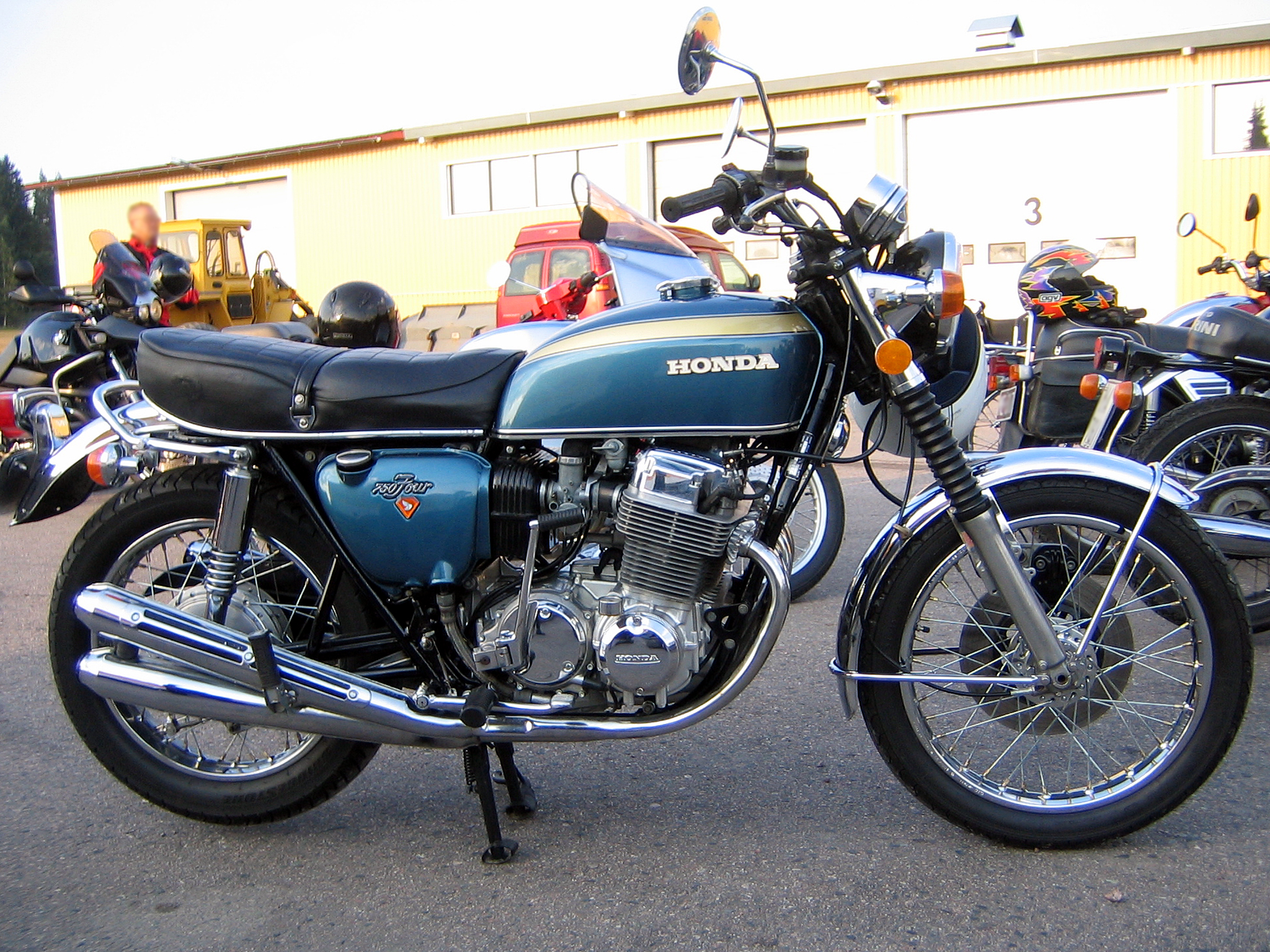
CB 750 "Four" 1969 to 1978, the model that set a new standard for "Superbikes"

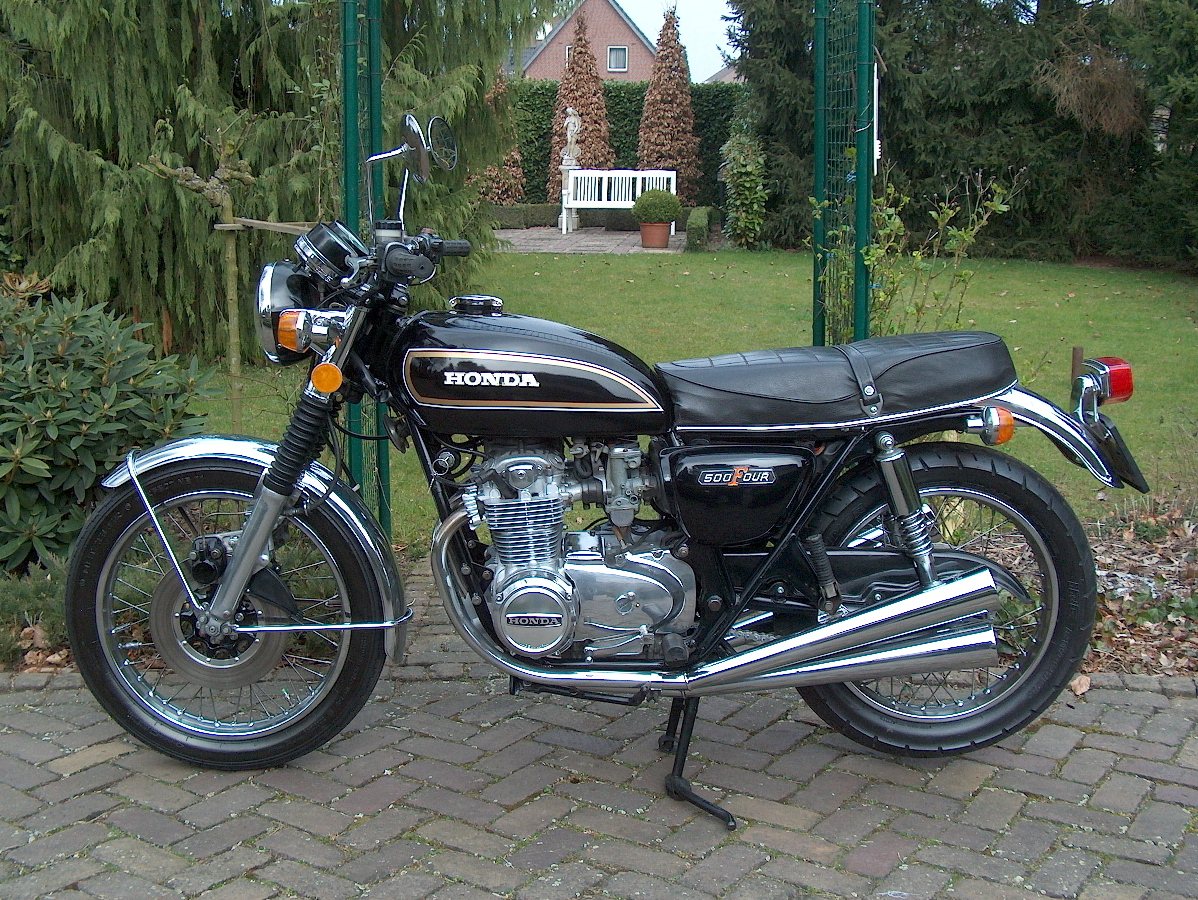
CB 500 "Four", the first model with a 500 cc engine 1972 to 1977

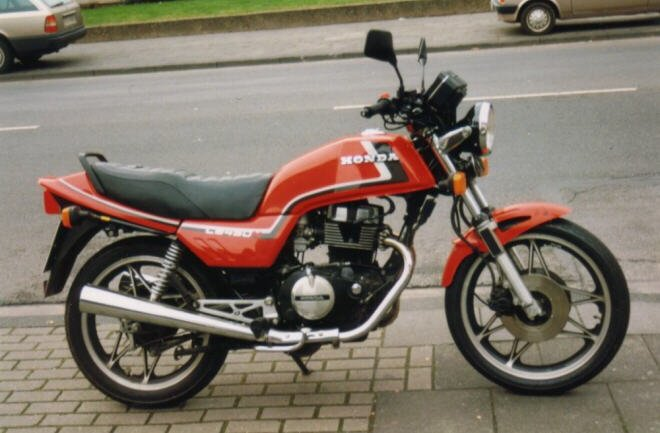
CB450N, a simpler version of the CB450

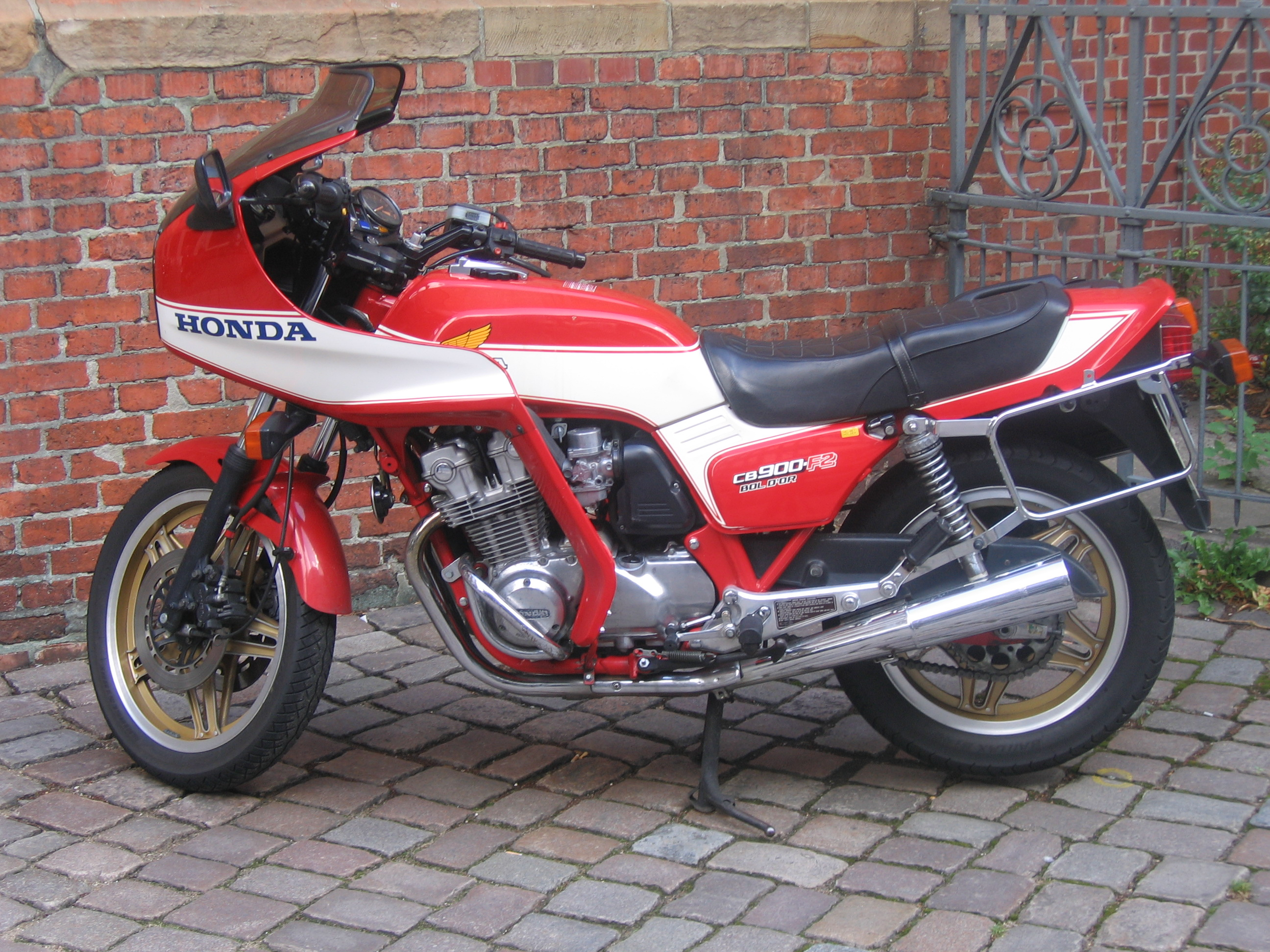
CB900F "Bol d´Or" (also built in 750 and 1100 versions) (1979 to 1984)

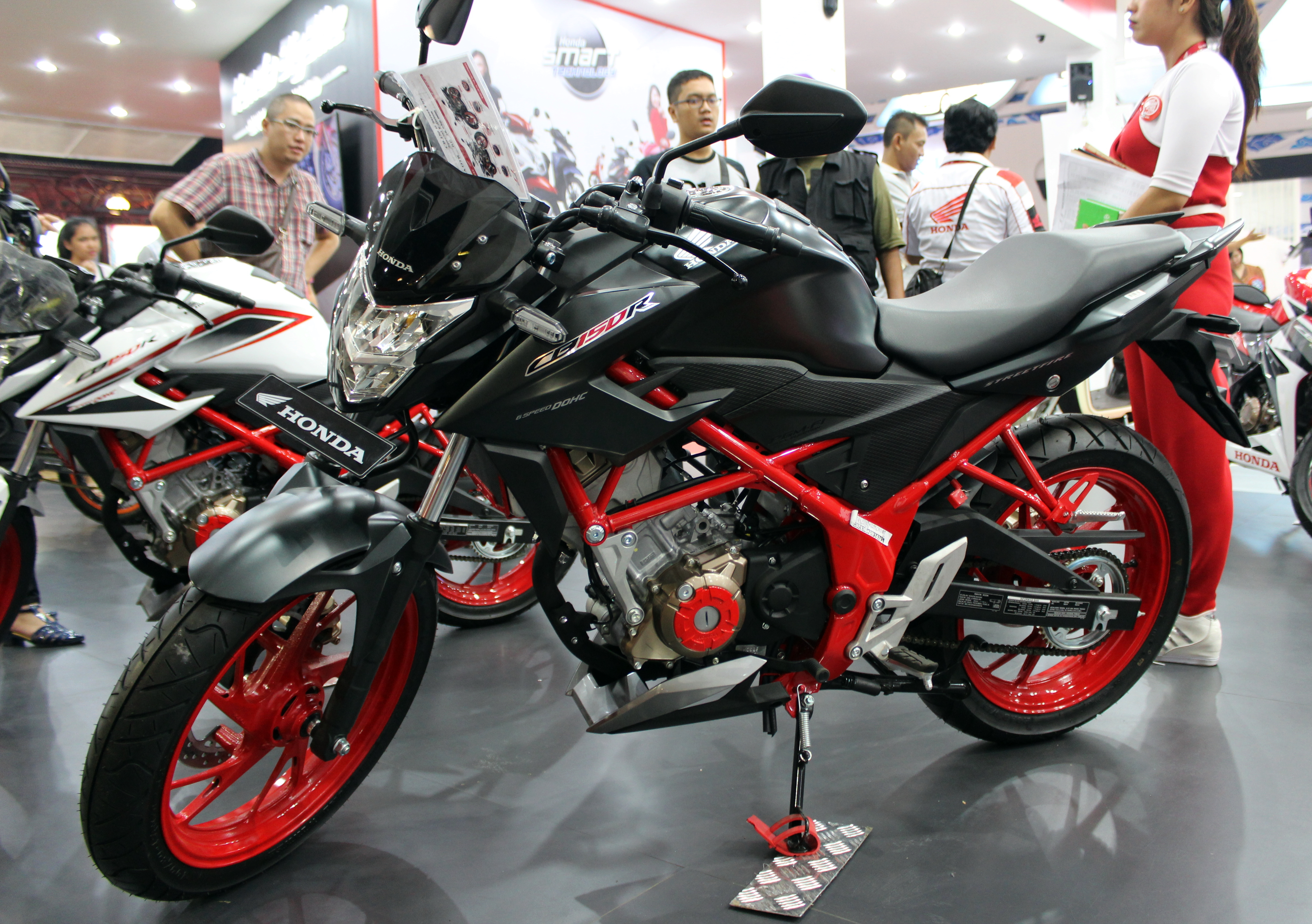
2016 CB150R Streetfire

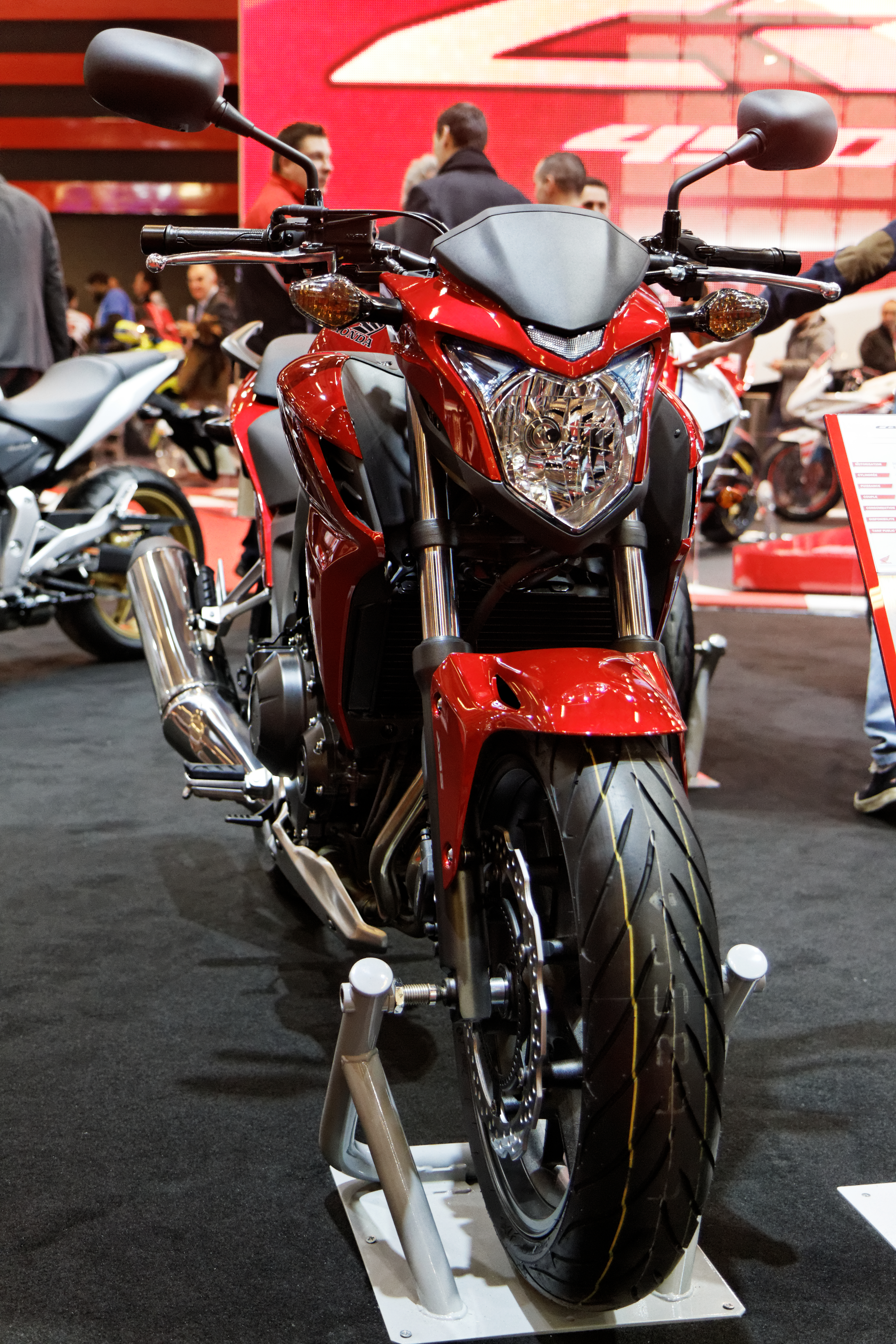
2013 CB500F naked 471 cc twin

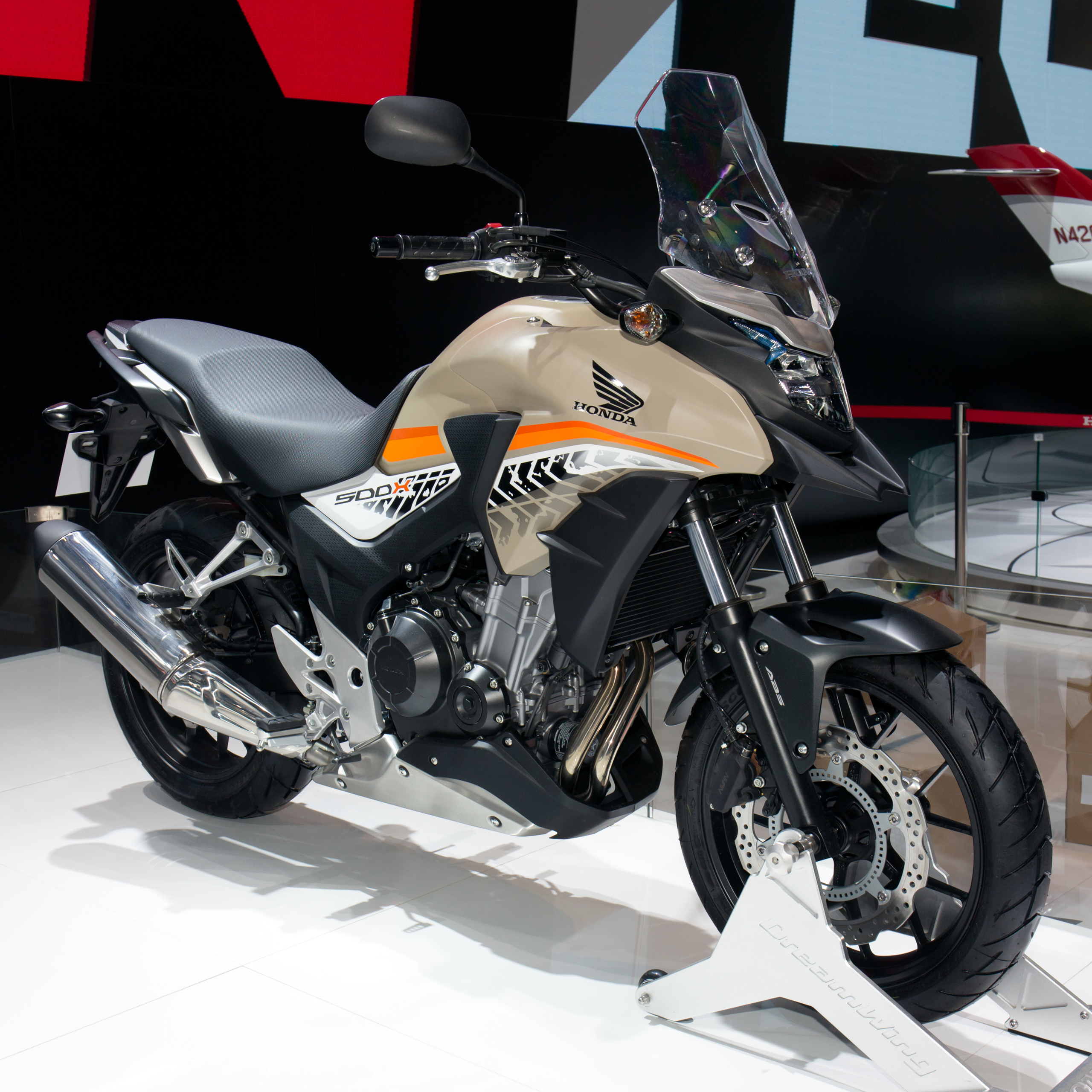
2016 CB500X

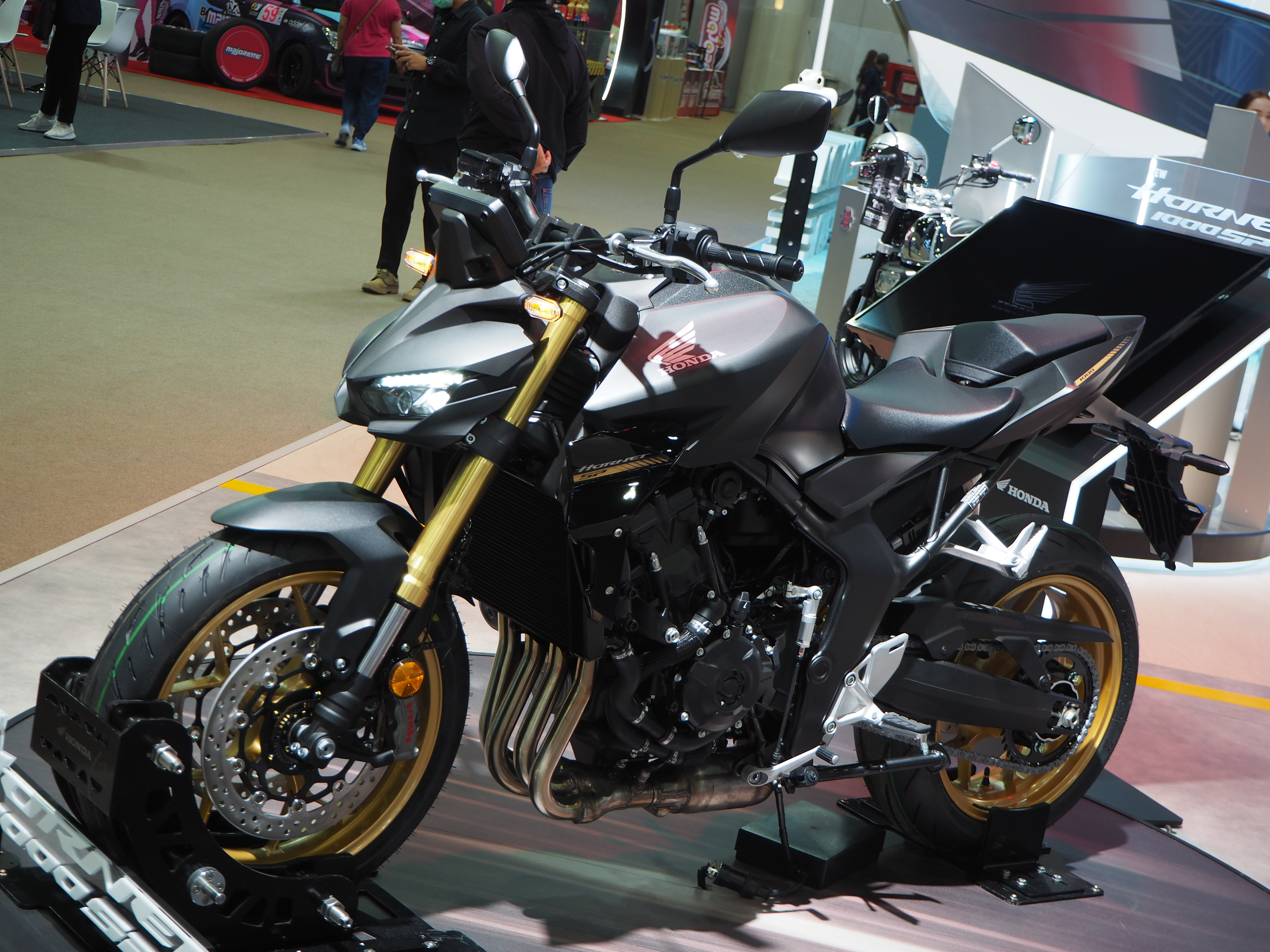
2025 CB1000 Hornet

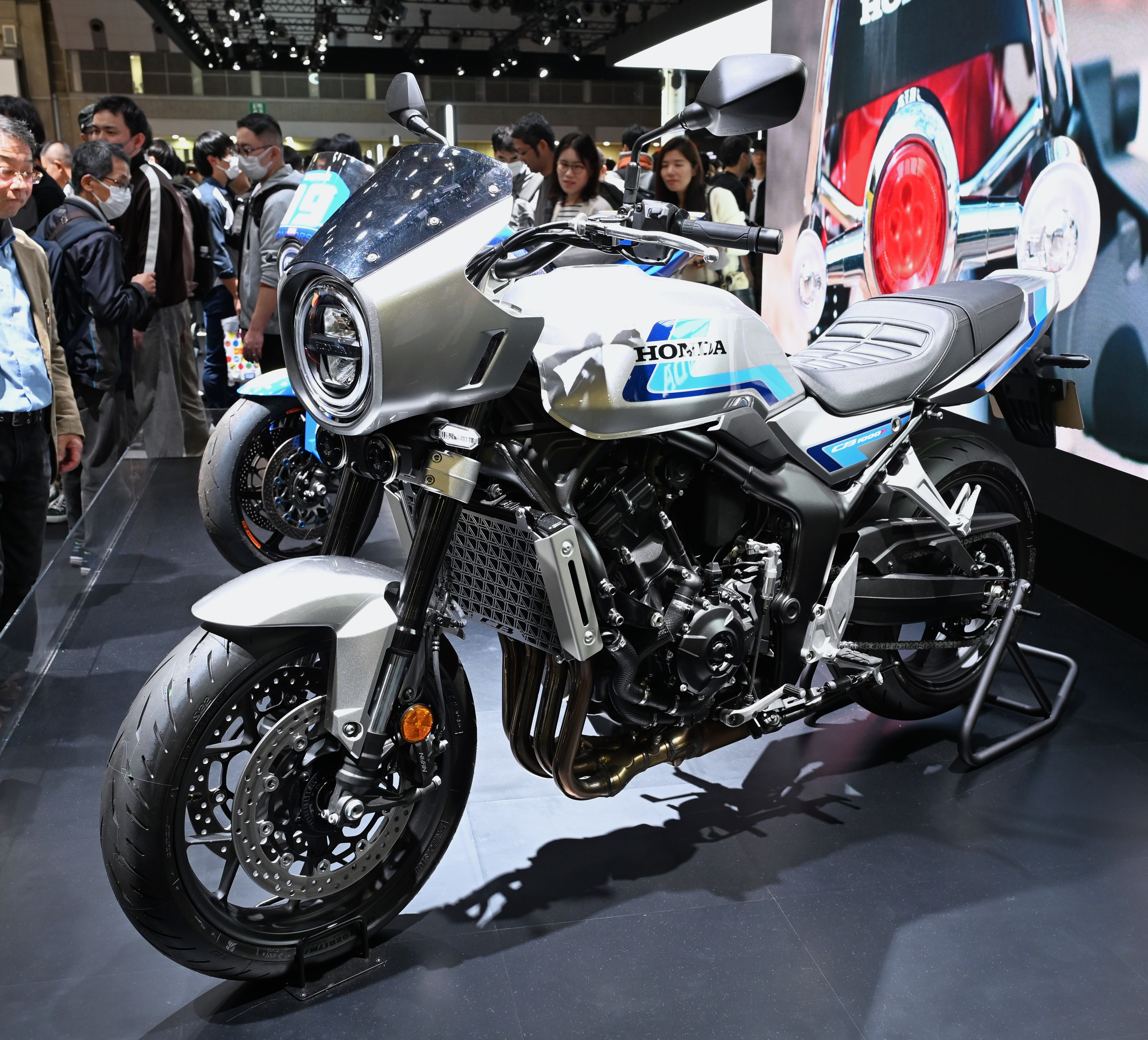
2026 CB1000F

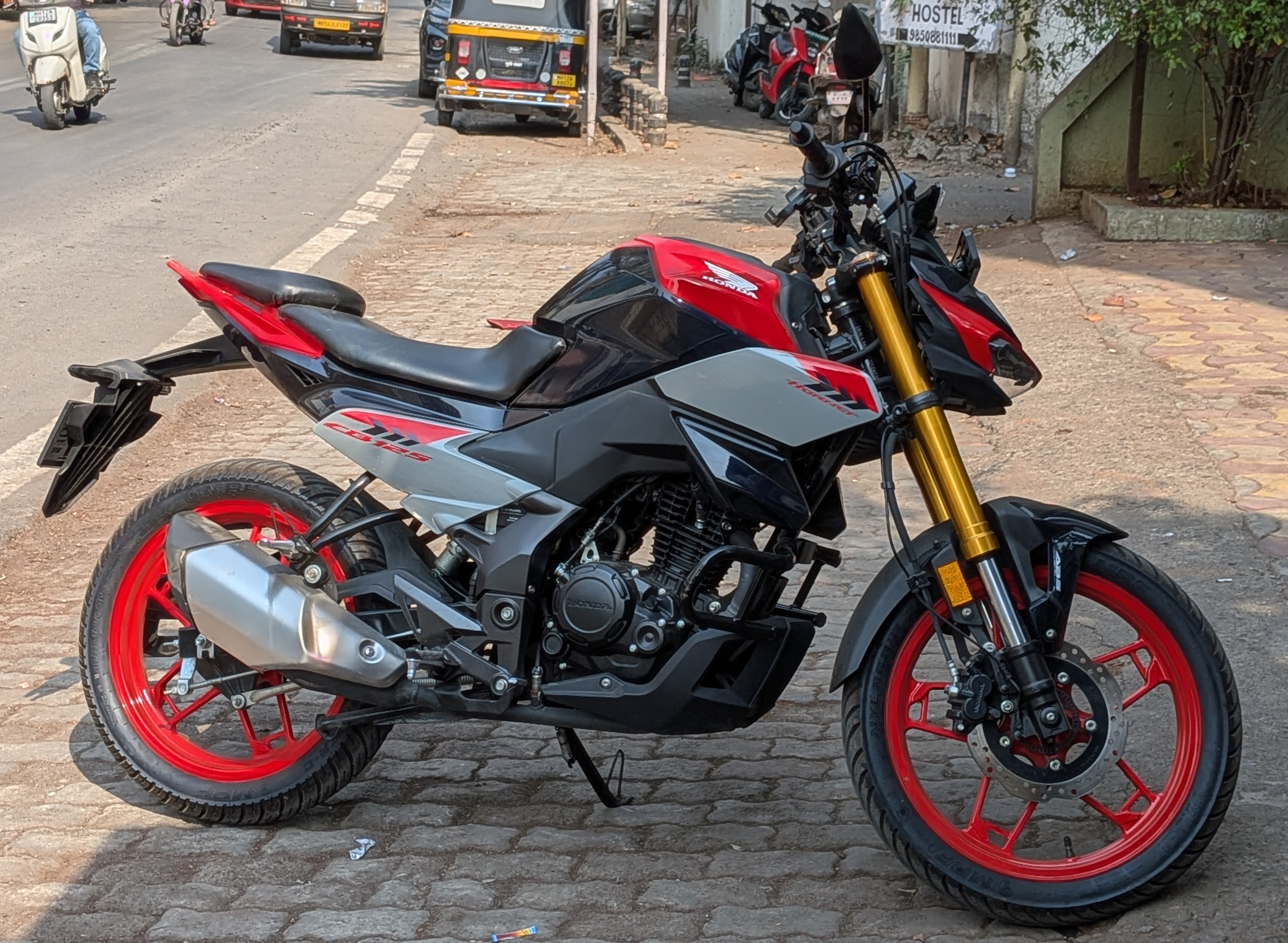
CB125 Hornet

* Note: unless otherwise stated the engine capacity in ccs can be derived from the number in the model reference.
