= Honda CBR250 =

Honda CBR250 may refer to:

- Honda CBR250/250R/250RR, a 1986–1996 Japanese domestic market inline-four sport bike.
- Honda CBR250R (2011), a single-cylinder sport bike made since 2011.
- Honda CBR250RR (2017), a twin-cylinder sport bike, made since late 2016.
