= Honda CB250 =

Honda has made several different motorcycle designs with the designation CB250, beginning with the Honda Dream CB250 in 1968.

Other Honda CB250 models include:

- Honda CB250 (1968–73)
- Honda CB250 G5 (1974–1976)
- Honda CB250T Dream (1977–1978)
- Honda CB250N Super Dream (1979–1981)
- Honda CB250RS (1980–1984)
- Honda CB250 Nighthawk (1982–2008)
- Honda CB250F Jade (1991–1995), based on the 1991–1996 CBR250RR
- Honda CB250F, also known as the 250 Hornet, the replacement for the CB250F Jade
