= Honda Jade =

Honda Jade may refer to:

- Honda Jade (motorcycle), a standard motorcycle launched in March 1991
- Honda Jade (automobile), a compact MPV introduced in September 2013
