= Honda Hornet (disambiguation) =

Multiple Honda motorcycles have had the moniker Honda Hornet:

- Honda CB250F, sold exclusively in Japan
- Honda CB600F, sold as 599 in USA, Hornet in Europe and Brazil
- Honda CB900F (second generation), sold as 919 in USA, Hornet 900 in Europe
- Honda CB500 Hornet, introduced in 2024 as a successor to the Honda CB500F
- Honda CB750 Hornet, a 755cc street motorcycle released in 2023
