= Honda CB50 =

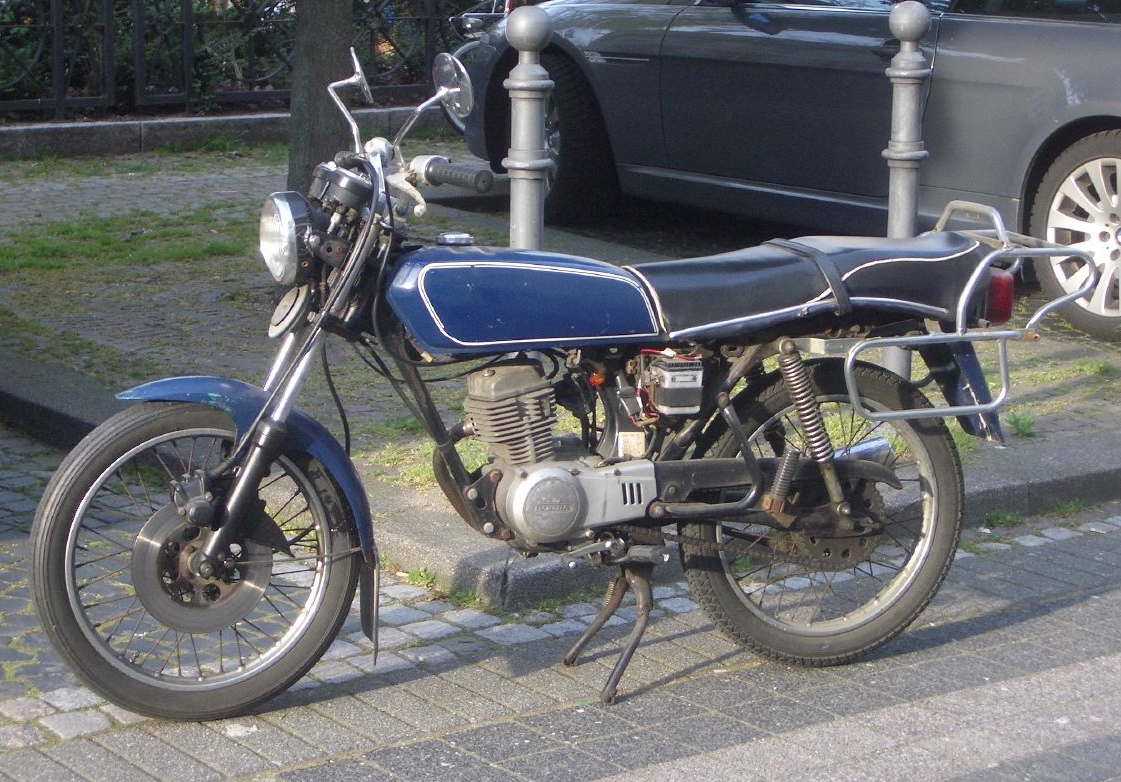
- Manufacturer: Honda Motor Company
- Production: 1971–
- Class: Standard
- Engine: 50 cc (3.1 cu in), air cooled, four stroke, SOHC, single

The Honda CB50 is a 50 cc (3.1 cu in), single-cylinder, four-stroke, SOHC street motorcycle manufactured by the Honda Motor Company, from 1971.

The model was originally introduced in the Japanese domestic market as the Benly CB50. It was the smallest engine size in the CB series and quickly became popular with young riders due to its sporty styling, including a long, two-tone fuel tank.

The original Japanese market model, known as the CB50K1, was characterized by a high-performance, air-cooled, four-stroke engine. This 1971 model was capable of a maximum output of 6 PS (4.0 kW) at 10,500 rpm, with a reported maximum speed of 95 km/h.

An upgraded version, the CB50JX-1, followed in 1973, featuring an uprated engine with slightly higher output, and the addition of a cable-operated front disc brake as a luxury feature. The motorcycle experienced significant changes when it was exported to European markets, often around 1978, as the CB50J. Due to new European regulations designed to classify 50cc machines as "Slo-peds" for riders under 17, the engine's power was drastically restricted. The European specification was down-rated to just 2 bhp at 5,500 rpm, reducing the top speed to only 40 km/h (25 mph).

Despite these regional limitations, the CB50 remains fondly remembered as an entry-level bike that sparked a lifelong passion for riding in many.
