= Honda CBR250F =

Sport bike

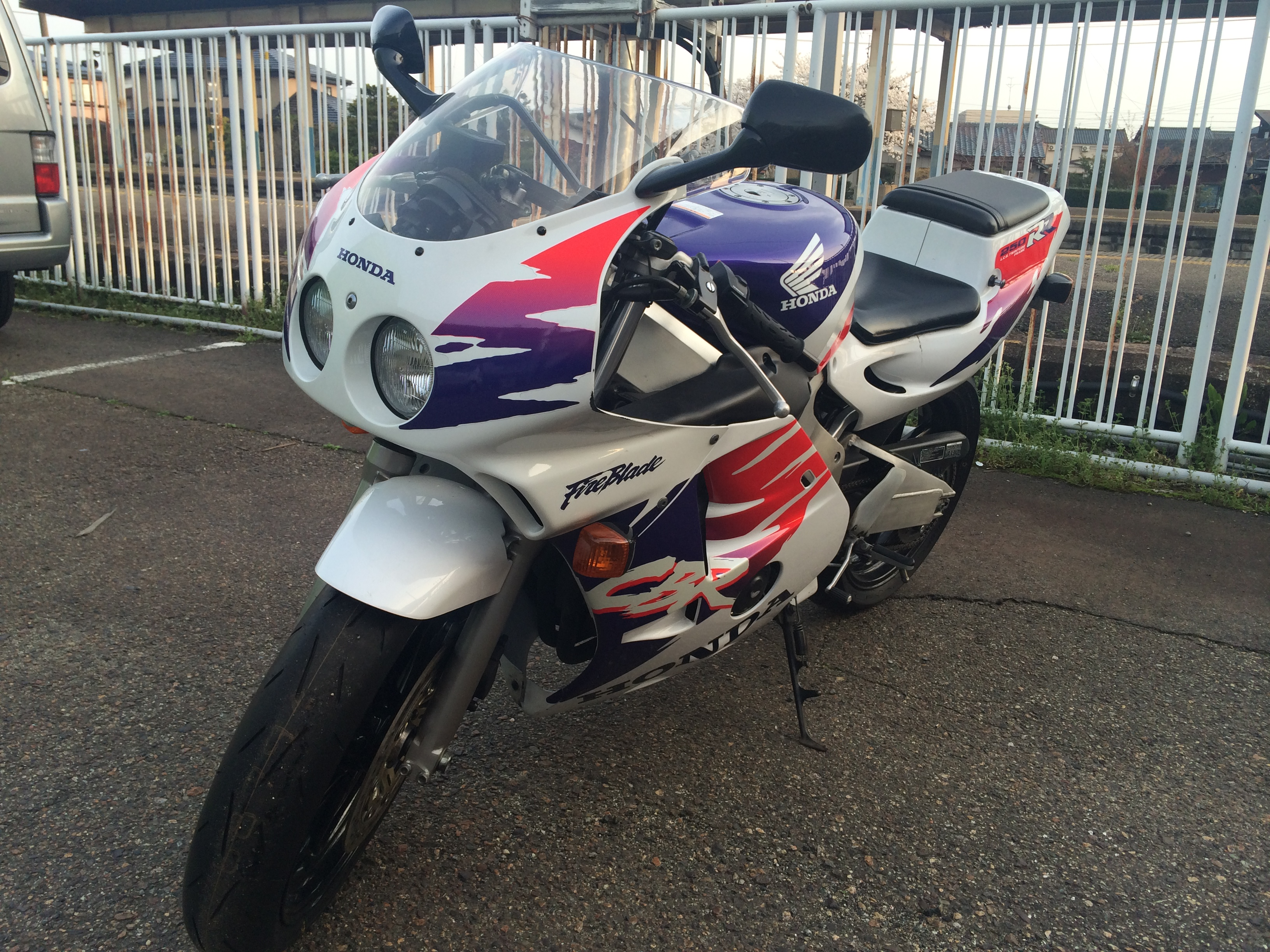
- Honda CBR250RR
- Manufacturer: Honda
- Also called: CBR250 Four, CBR250R, CBR250RR
- Production: 1986-2000 (Discontinued 1996 in Japan)
- Successor: Honda CBR250R (2011)
- Class: Sport bike
- Engine: 249 cc (15.2 cu in) liquid-cooled, DOHC, 16-valve, inline 4-cylinder
- Bore / stroke: 48.5 mm × 33.8 mm (1.91 in × 1.33 in)
- Compression ratio: 11.0:1
- Top speed: 112 mph (180 km/h)
- Power: 45 PS (33 kW) @ 14500 rpm
- Torque: 24 N⋅m (18 lbf⋅ft) @ 10500 r/min
- Ignition type: CDI
- Transmission: 6-speed
- Tires: Front: 100/80 - R17 52H; Rear: 130/70 - R17 62H
- Dimensions: L: 2,000 mm (79 in); W: 685 mm (27.0 in); H: 1,080 mm (43 in)
- Weight: 153 kg (337 lb) (wet)
- Fuel capacity: 14 L (3.1 imp gal; 3.7 US gal)
- Related: Honda CB250F

The Honda CBR250F is a CBR series 249 cc (15.2 cu in) four-cylinder sport bike made by Honda. The CBR250F was first sold in Japan in 1986. The CBR250RR MC22 was discontinued in 1996 in Japan, but sales continued in Australia until 2000.

== Overview ==
The CBR250F aka CBR250 Four was made in 1986. Motorcycle racing was popular at the time, with the Japanese Grand Prix and Suzuka 8 Hours drawing large crowds. Licensing restrictions in Japan also caused small displacement motorcycles to make up the bulk of motorcycle sales. Thus, the CBR250F sport bike was born. Other Japanese manufacturers would also design 250cc 4 cylinder sport bikes, such as the Suzuki GSX-R250, Yamaha FZR250, and Kawasaki ZXR250.

== Specifications ==
Model	Honda CBR250F MC14	Honda CBR250R MC17	Honda CBR250R MC19	Honda CBR250RR MC22	
Years	1986	1987	1988–1989	1990–1994	1994–2000
Length	2,000 mm (79 in)		2,020 mm (80 in)	1,975 mm (77.8 in)	
Width	685 mm (27.0 in)	680 mm (27 in)	685 mm (27.0 in)	675 mm (26.6 in)	
Height	1,120 mm (44 in)		1,075 mm (42.3 in)	1,080 mm (43 in)	
Wheelbase	1,370 mm (54 in)	1,365 mm (53.7 in)		1,345 mm (53.0 in)	
Engine displacement	249 cc (15.2 cu in)				
Cylinder Configuration	Inline 4				
Valve System	DOHC	DOHC gear driven			
Bore and Stroke	48.5 x 33.8mm				
Compression Ratio	11.0			11.5	
Horsepower	45PS/14500RPM	45PS/15000RPM			40PS/14500RPM
Torque	2.5 kg⋅m (18 lb⋅ft)/10500RPM	2.6 kg⋅m (19 lb⋅ft)/10500RPM		2.5 kg⋅m (18 lb⋅ft)/12000RPM	2.4 kg⋅m (17 lb⋅ft)/12000RPM
Fuel Capacity	14 L (3.7 US gal)		13 L (3.4 US gal)		
Clutch	Multi-wet plate coil spring cable operated				
Transmission	6-speed				
Reduction	Chain				
Brakes	Hydraulic disc front and rear				
Front Suspension	Telescopic fork				
Rear Suspension	Diamond swing arm				
Weight	153 kg (337 lb)	155 kg (342 lb)	154 kg (340 lb)	157 kg (346 lb)	158 kg (348 lb)
Front Tyre	100/80 - 17 52H			110/70 - R17 54H	
Rear Tyre	130/70 - 17 62H		140/70 - 17 66H	140/60 - R17 63H	
Minimum Clearance	140 mm (5.5 in)		135 mm (5.3 in)	130 mm (5.1 in)	

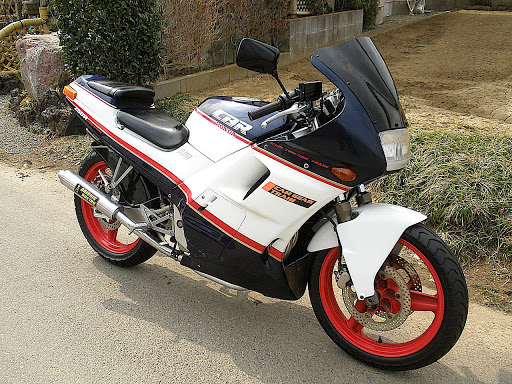
CBR250R {MC17)

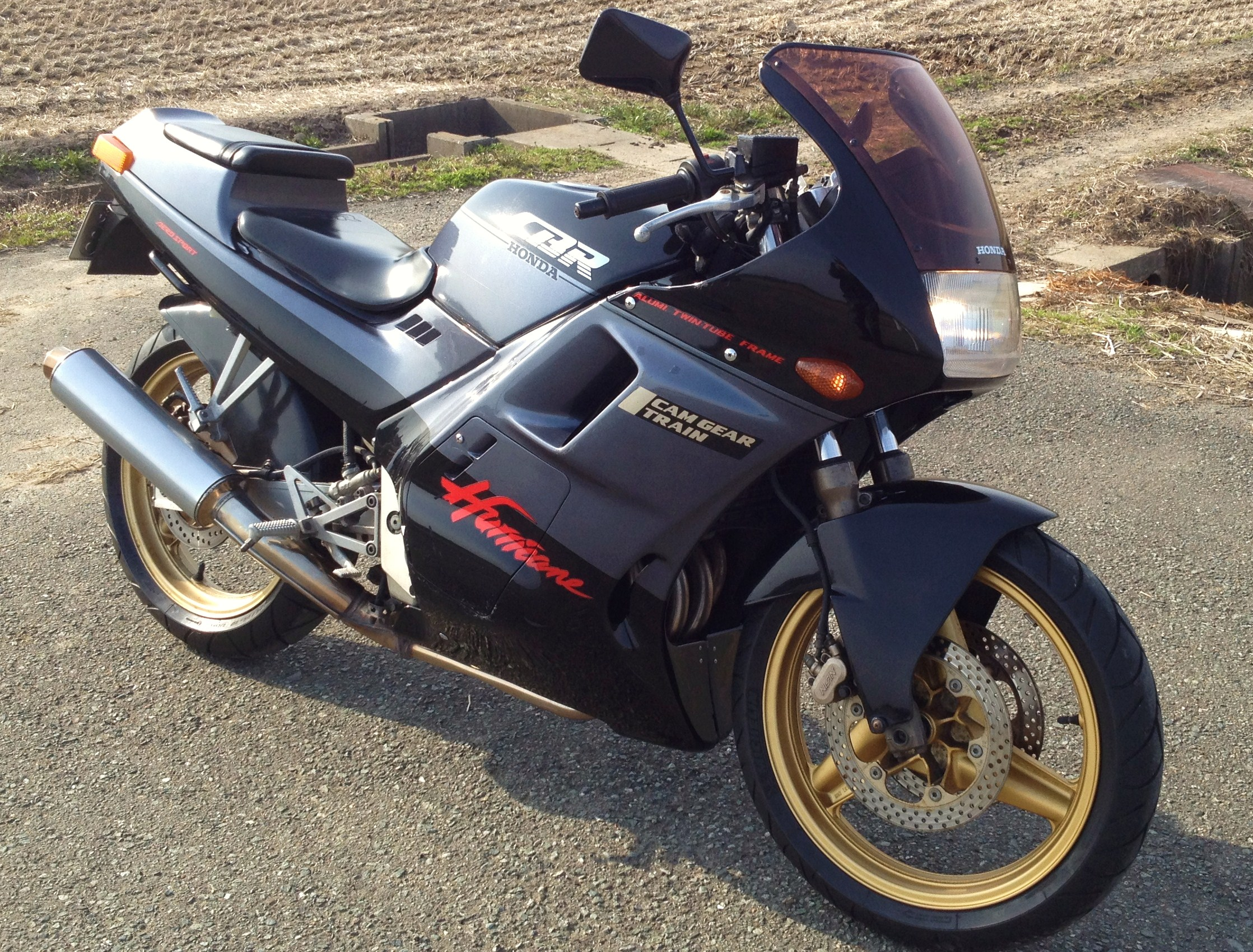
CBR250R(MC17)

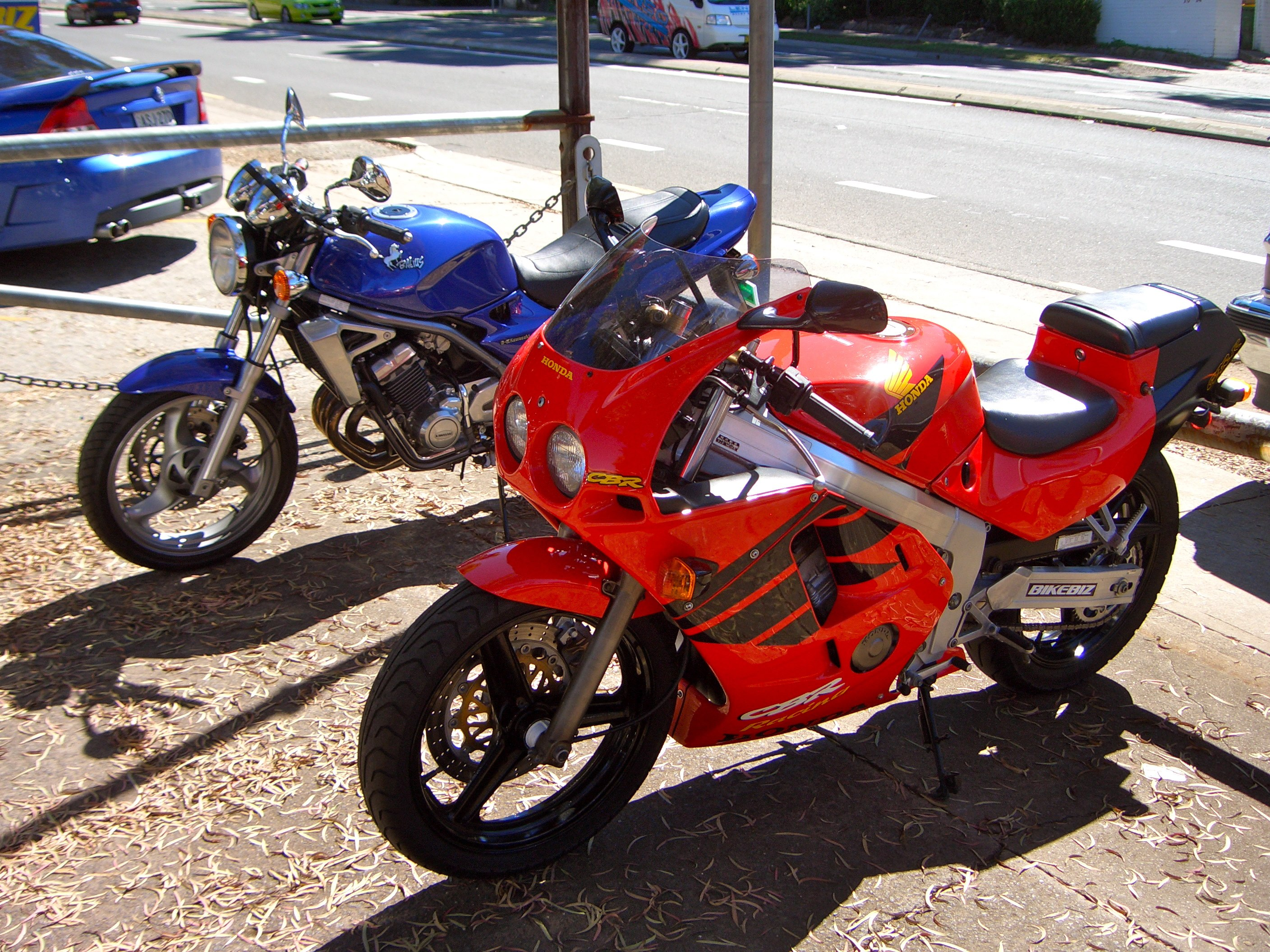
Honda CBR250R (MC19) with a Kawasaki Balius ZR250

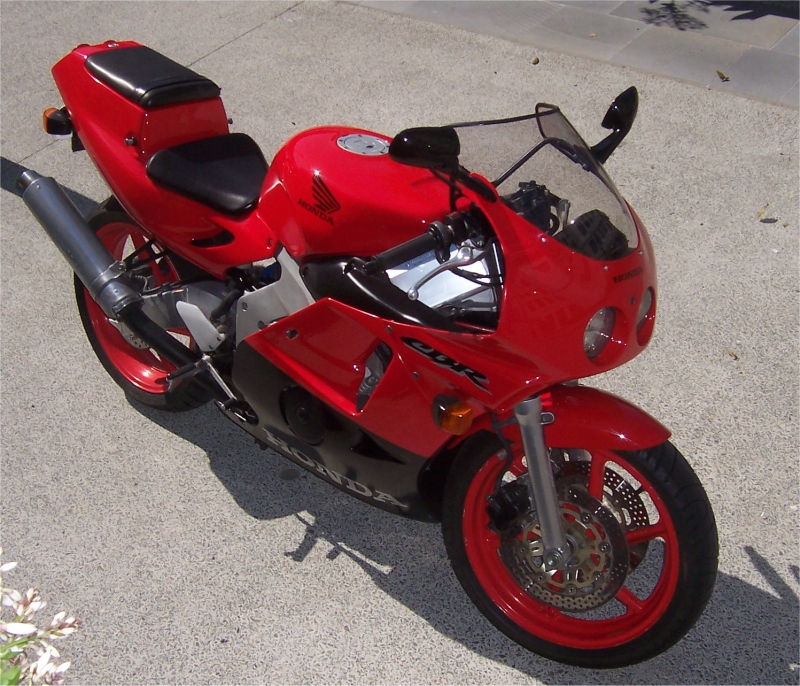
CBR250RR (MC22)

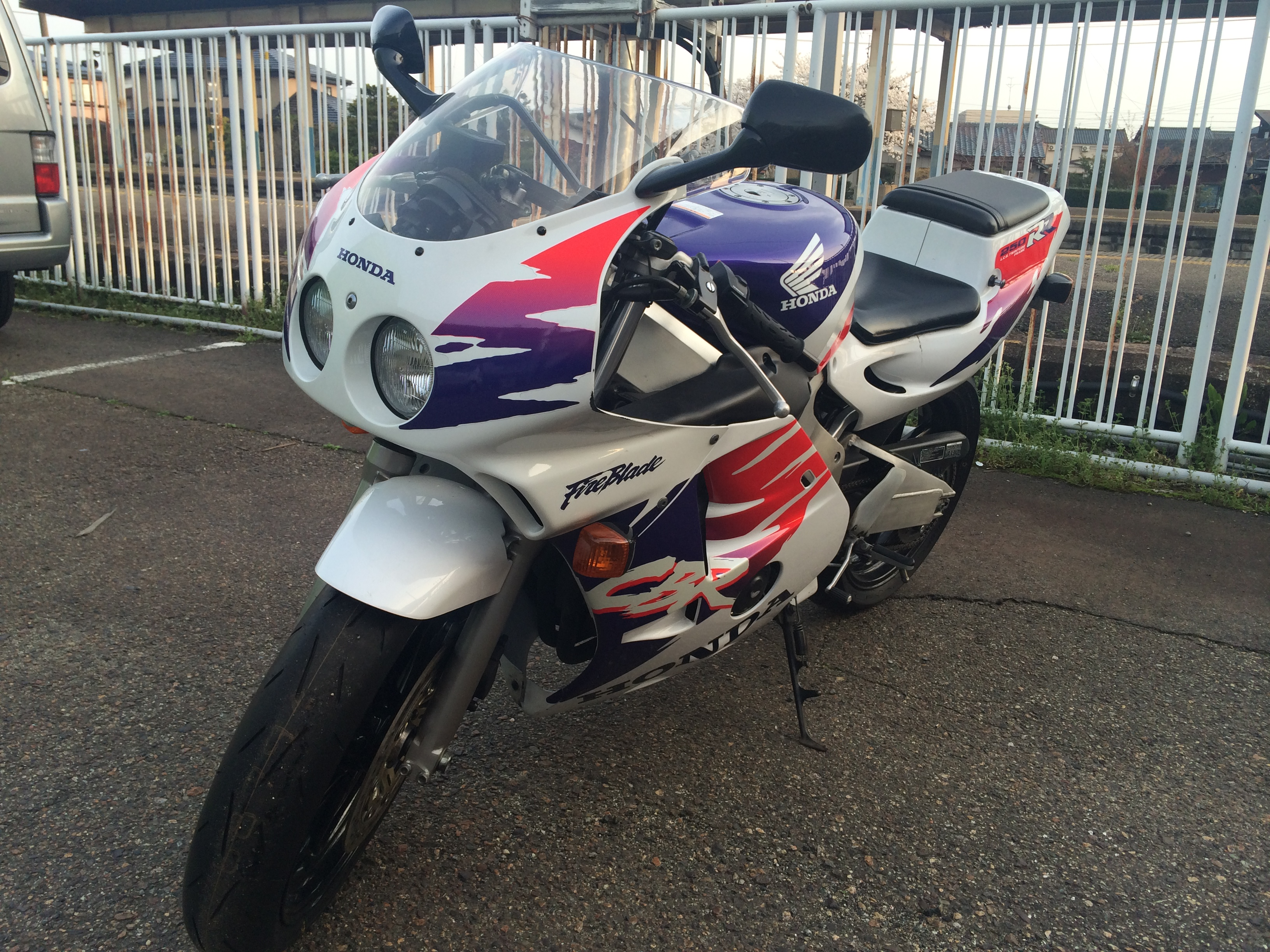
CBR250RR (MC22)
