= Honda Jade (motorcycle) =

Honda Jade (Note: Honda marketed this motorcycle with the internal type code MC23 as 'Jade' (without 'CB' or '250'), and its sister-model with the internal type code MC22 as 'CBR250RR'. The factory service manual for MC23 (Honda part number A42009103M, dated February 1991) states the name 'Jade' and 'CB250F(MC23)' on its front cover.)
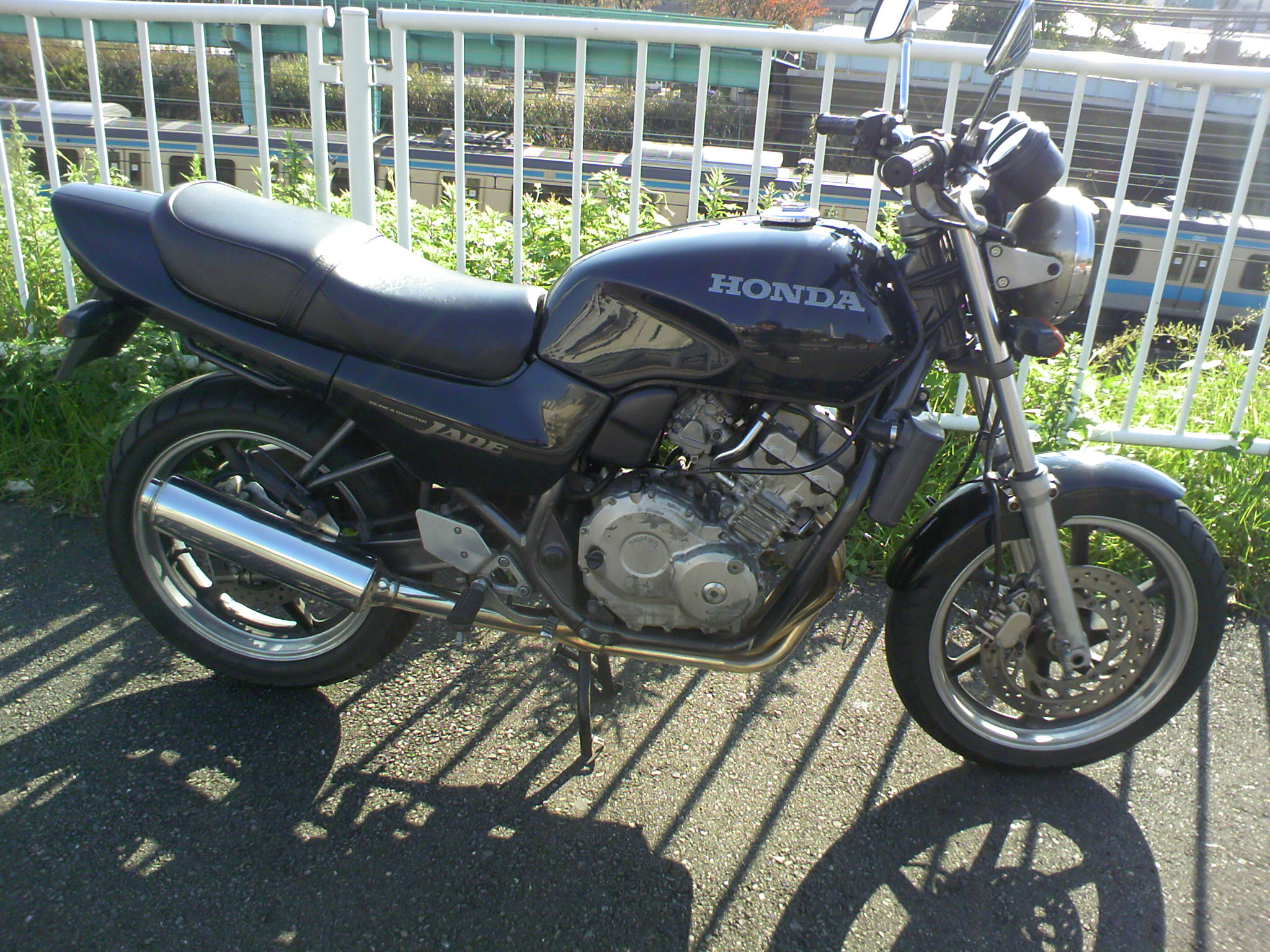
- Honda Jade (MY1991)
- Manufacturer: Honda
- Also called: CB250F Jade, Jade 250, MC23
- Production: 1991–1996
- Predecessor: Honda CB250N
- Successor: Honda CB250F Hornet
- Class: Standard
- Engine: MD14E; 249 cc (15.2 cu in) liquid-cooled, DOHC, 16-valve, inline 4-cylinder
- Bore / stroke: 48.5 mm × 33.8 mm (1.91 in × 1.33 in)
- Compression ratio: 11.5:1
- Top speed: 108 mph (174 km/h)
- Power: 40 hp (30 kW) @ 14000 rpm
- Torque: 2.4 kgf (24 N; 5.3 lbf) @ 11000 rpm
- Ignition type: CDI
- Transmission: 6-speed, manual 520 chain drive 112-links
- Frame type: Double-cradle steel pipe frame
- Suspension: Front: 41mm telescopic forks Rear: Showa Monoshock with swingarm, preload adjustable.
- Brakes: Front: Hydraulic disc, Single 296mm disc with 4-piston Nissin caliper Rear: Hydraulic disc, Single 220mm disc with single-piston Nissin caliper
- Tires: Front: 100/80-17 52S bias-ply Rear: 140/70-17 66S bias-ply
- Rake, trail: 26.17° / 100 mm (3.9 in)
- Wheelbase: 142.0 cm (55.9 in)
- Dimensions: L: 206.0 cm (81.1 in); W: 71.0 cm (28.0 in); H: 109.5 cm (43.1 in)
- Seat height: 78.0 cm (30.7 in)
- Weight: 146 kg (322 lb) (dry); 161 kg (355 lb) (wet)
- Fuel capacity: 14 L (3.1 imp gal; 3.7 US gal)
- Oil capacity: 2.7 L (0.59 imp gal; 0.71 US gal)
- Turning radius: 2.5 m (8 ft 2 in)
- Related: Honda CBR250RR (MC22)
- Ground clearance: 15.5 cm (6.1 in)

The Honda Jade also known as the Honda Jade 250, or Honda CB250F Jade is a standard motorcycle which was launched by Honda in March 1991 with its internal type designation 'MC23'. It was available in Japan as a domestic model from 1991 to 1996. Powered by a de-tuned version of the inline-four 249 cc engine from the CBR250RR (1990-1995), with 11.5:1 compression ratio, it produces 40 PS at 14,000 rpm with redline of 16,000 rpm. The bike features a 6-speed transmission, 14-litre fuel tank, and a center stand.

== Engine ==
The engine is basically the same as the sport bike CBR250RR (MC22), liquid-cooled with "spur-gears driven" (in the style of racing engines) DOHC with 4 valves per cylinder (Honda engine type MD14E. CBR250RR engine type is MC14E). In addition to having four of specially developed Keihin VP21 carburetors (VP20 on MC14E), the cam timing is quite different by having zero valve overlap (MC14E:19/33/36/11, Jade:3/27/29/-3) with smaller lift (MC14E:IN5.9mmEX5.4mm, Jade:IN5.2mmEX5.0mm). This tuning allowed the engine to provide more low-end torque and a linear power delivery through the wide usable rev range up to the 16,000 rpm rev limit (19,000 rpm on MC14E).

Intake and exhaust valves have 3.5mm diameter stem for a light weight, with IN 19.0mm (Silicon-Chromium steel alloy, 10.0g) and EX 16.5mm (Inconel 751, 9.6g) sizes. To place these valves on the 48.5mm bore and ensure proper cooling, the spark-plug (NGK CR8EH-9) diameter is small at 10.0mm. Crankshaft and conrods were computer-designed with the finite element method.

All-stainless exhaust system, welded in a single large unit from the 4-into-1 exhaust manifold to the muffler and thoroughly polished into a mirror finish, replaced the 4-into-2-into-1 steel manifold / aluminium muffler combination of the CBR250RR. The radiator had a 12V fan without a fan shroud, which is hardly audible in operation.

== Transmission ==
The 6-speed constant-mesh gearbox is the same as MC22 except 14-teeth-front and 42-rear (taller ratio) 520-size sprockets, with the primary reduction ratio of 1:2.966 (Note: In most motorcycles, crankshaft drives the gearbox input with spur- or helical-gears with a reduction. This ratio is called the primary reduction, followed by the gearbox reduction and the final (the chain or belt-drive reduction to the rear wheel) ratios. Given the tyre circumference/diameter, engine rpm at a certain speed can be calculated with the availability of the three ratios.) and 2.733/2.000/1.590/1.333/1.153/1.035, with Neutral in between 1st and 2nd. The clutch has 7 discs and 7 plates engaged by 4 coil springs.

== Suspension ==
Instead of the aluminium-alloy swing-arm on aluminium frame of MC22, Jade had a steel-fabricated swing-arm on a steel-pipe double-cradle frame. The rear Monoshock shock absorber had a stroke-dependent progressive rate damping (the first for Honda Monoshock), and a needle-roller bearing on the lower attachment point for a lower friction, which is directly mounted on the swing-arm without a linking lever. The front suspension was a 41mm regular telescopic forks. Six-spoke cast aluminium wheels are standard, with tubeless bias-ply tyres.

== Brakes ==
Jade had a single 296mm fixed disc with four-pot Nissin floating caliper in front and a single fixed disc with one-pot Nissin floating caliper in the rear. The adjustment mechanism is provided by a knurled steel thumbwheel on the brake lever for the front, and a bolt and fixing nut on the brake pedal for the rear.

These differences, including double-disc front brakes, full fairing, and aluminium-alloy brake/shifter pedals on MC22; and a larger 14 Litre fuel tank, steel brake/shifter pedals, stainless muffler, and steel center stand on the Jade, resulted in a 4kg heavier dry weight (MC22:142kg., MC23:146kg).

== History ==
In Japan, motorcycles with a displacement of 125 to 249.9cc enjoy a special segment in the market. The riding ban on highways that limits the utility of "under 125cc" class does not apply; at the same time, the costly inspection requirement, as well as the higher tax and insurance cost on the "250cc and over" motorcycles are avoided. Honda offered numerous 250cc models with actual displacement slightly less, starting with Dream SA in 1955, before the introduction of the 'CB' series in 1959 by the CB92 Super Sport (sportier version of C92). Four-cylinder CB began with CB750 of 1969, followed by CB500 Four in 1971, and CB350 Four in 1972, all air-cooled without a radiator. CB400 SuperFour (air-cooled), introduced in 1974, received a big boost in sales with the introduction of the "Middle Size" motorcycle riding license in the country in 1975. The 250cc four-cylinder format was pioneered by the water-cooled CBR250 Four in 1986, and Jade was the first street bike in this format without a racer-replica riding position and fairing.

At the introduction, the Jade was an addition to the commercial/utility single and double seat versions of 360°-crank two cylinder CD250U (MA02) and the 90° V-twin VT250 Spada (MC20). The Nighthawk 250 (MC26) with a single carburetor version of CD250U engine was added later in March 1992 at Yen 349,000, placing Jade at 37% more expensive in the 250cc lineup.

=== Jade (CB250FM) 1991-1993 ===
Honda announced this "naked road-sport" motorcycle on 8 March 1991, based on the CBR250RR sport-bike with racer-replica styling that debuted in 1990. Jade became available from 15 March with the colour selection of Black, Granite Blue Metallic, Candy Bourgogne Red, or Tasmania Green Metallic. Unlike the popular racer-replica bikes of the time, Jade always had a center stand. Tachometer (incorporating a water temp gauge) was smaller in diameter than the Speedo (incorporating the Odo and Trip), and both had a black plastic housing. Fuel gauge was never available in the series.

A helmet lock was incorporated into the seat lock mechanism in the left rear, operated by the ignition key. Winker units had smoked orange lens, the engine/transmission assembly (with the sides of cylinder-block having (largely cosmetic) cooling fins added over MC22) was painted silver, and the front brake caliper was painted gold. There is a small glove box (with a tool pouch) behind the seat, under the rear cowl. 3-position petrol tap has an additional valve opened by the intake manifold vacuum, preventing fuel from flowing when the engine is not in operation.

The price was Yen 479,000. "Overspeed Warning System" was an additional factory option, with cargo carrier (made in steel pipe with a plastic shelf) a dealer option.

=== Jade/S (CB250FN) 1992-1993 ===
On 19 March 1992, an expensive version with cosmetic differences (called the "Jade slash S") was announced at the price of Yen 499,000. Made available from 7 April, it features two-tone paint (Candy Bourgogne Red/Black or Metallic Blue/Black) with all-black wheels, as an addition to the Jade product line. The Tachometer and Speedo are made to the same diameter and housed in a common chrome-plated (plastic) housing, with the winker lens in transparent orange. The front/rear brake calipers were painted black. The headlight on/off switch is omitted. The engine/transmission assembly was painted in dark grey metallic with the alternator cover cap in brush-polished aluminium colour.

=== Jade (CB250FP) 1993-1996 ===
A facelift was announced on 28 May 1993 to be available 10 June, and the /S model was discontinued. This facelift incorporated the black front brake caliper, brushed metal plate on the sides of the radiator, the same big diameter Tacho and Speedo in chrome-coloured plastic housing, winker lens in transparent orange, and brush-polished alternator cover of the /S, but not the all-black wheels. The engine/transmission assembly was painted in still-darker grey metallic, with the cam cover and the left crankcase cover brush-polished. The headlight on-off switch was omitted. The available colours are Vortex Purple Metallic, Tasmania Green Metallic, or Black in single colours, at the price of Yen 499,000.

The production ceased as the CB250F Hornet became available in 1996.

== See also ==
- Honda CB250
- Honda CBR250F
