= Honda CB600F =

Honda CB600F/Hornet/599
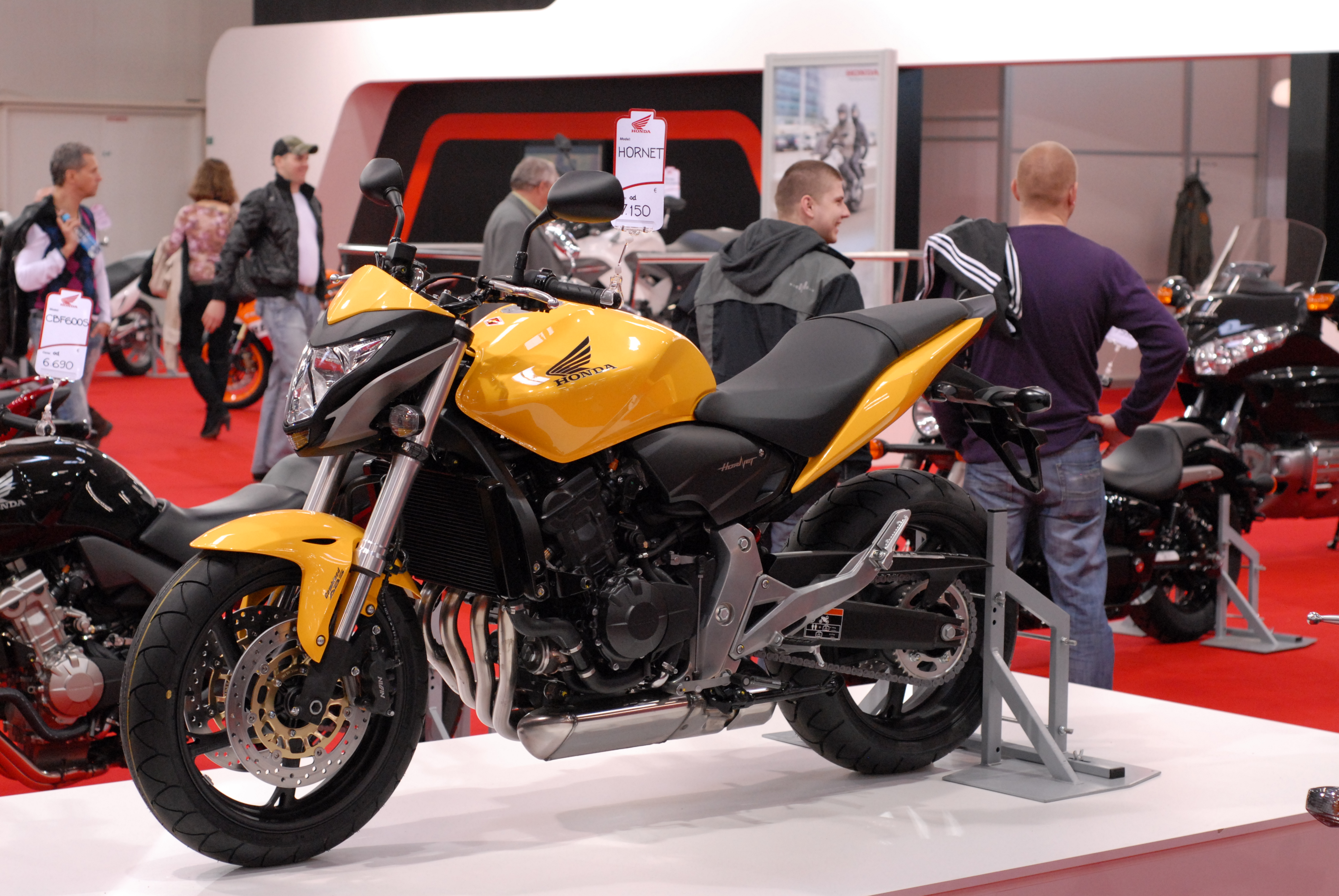
- 2011 CB600F
- Manufacturer: Honda
- Also called: Honda Hornet (Europe and Brazil); Honda 599 (United States)
- Production: 1998–2013
- Successor: Honda CB650F
- Class: Standard
- Engine: 599 cc (36.6 cu in), liquid cooled, inline four
- Related: Honda CB900F; Honda CBR600F3; Honda CBR600RR

The Honda CB600F (known as the Hornet in Europe and Brazil and 599 in the U.S.) is a street motorcycle manufactured by Honda. It is powered by a 599 cc (36.6 cu in) liquid-cooled inline-four engine, originally a detuned version of that in the Honda CBR600 sport bike, which currently produces around 102 bhp (76 kW). The 'Hornet' name was not taken to North America as AMC, and its successor, Chrysler, had trademarked the name with the AMC Hornet.

== History ==
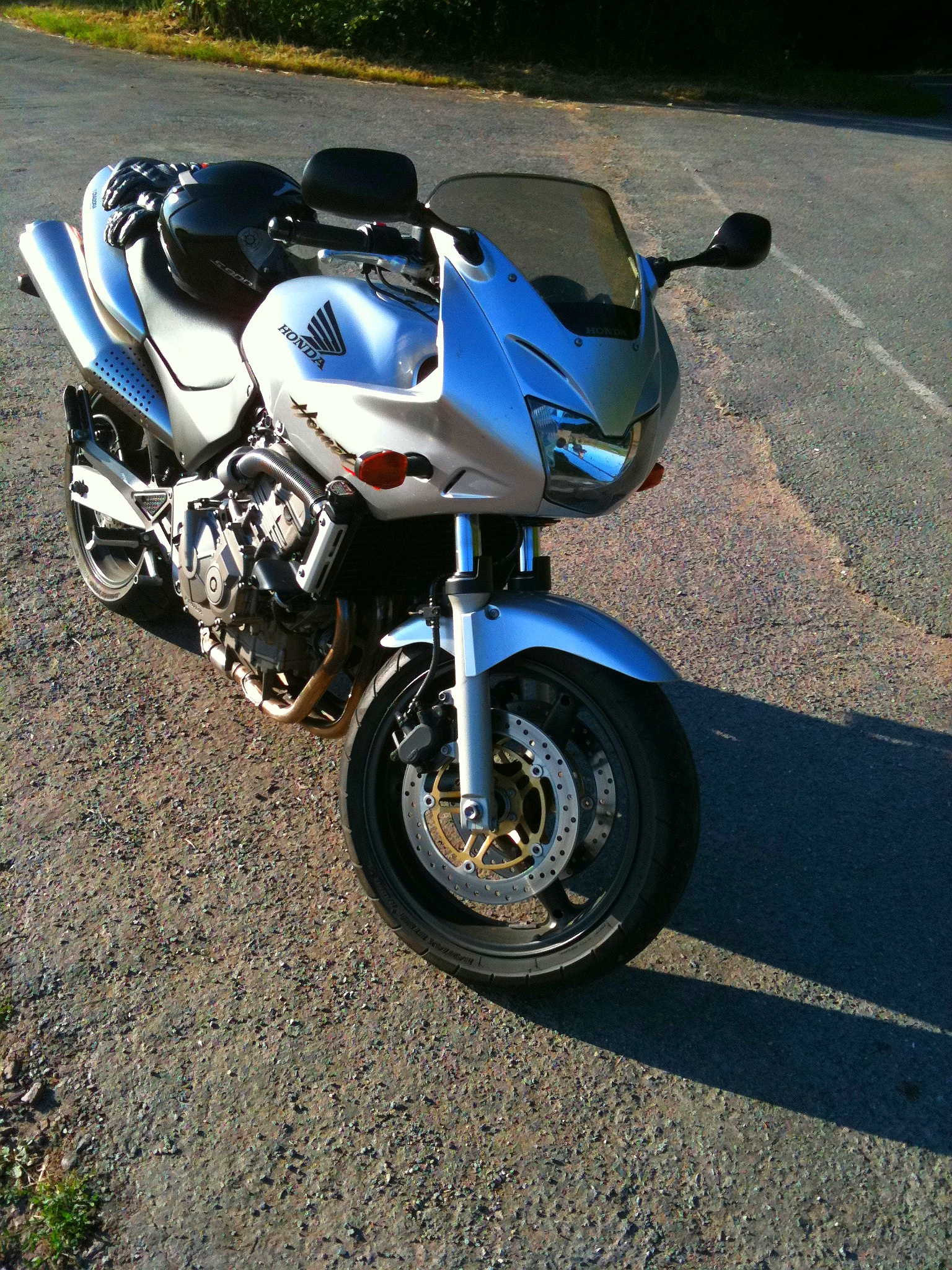
2002 Honda CB600S

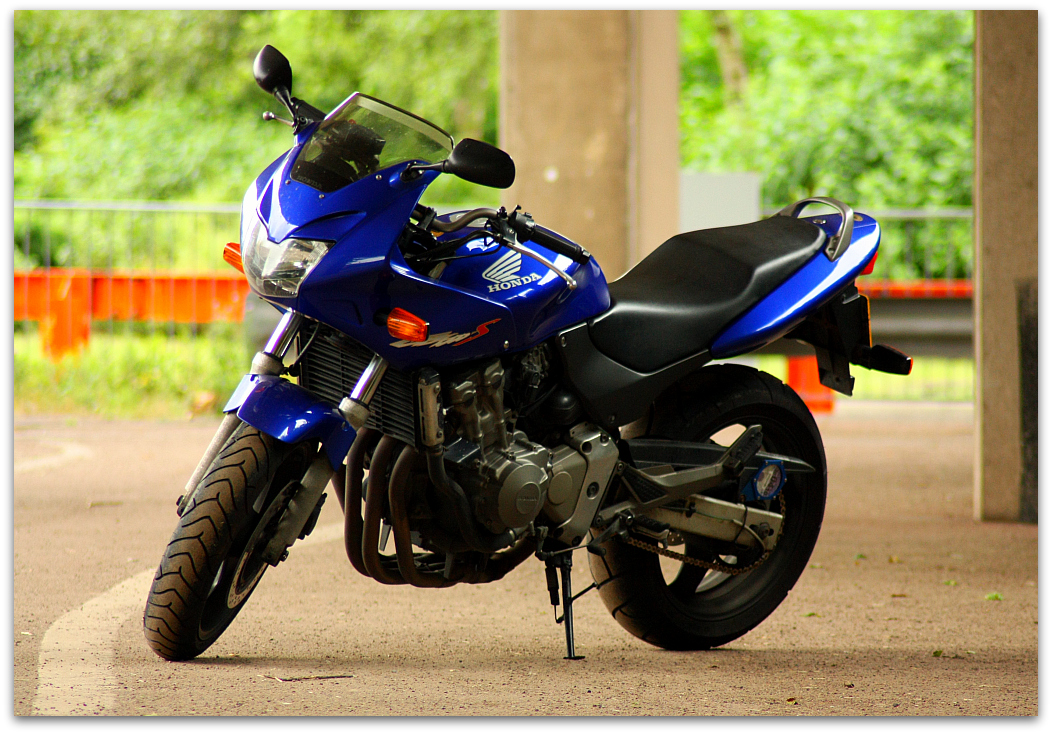
Honda CB600S

The Honda CB600F Hornet was introduced for Europe in 1998. It was based on the CB250F that was restricted to 250 cc (15 cu in) at its home-market (Japan) because of local laws (this bike was released only in Japan from 1996 or 1997 until 2015, when it was succeeded by the CB300F). The bike has a six-speed transmission. Its suspension consists of a single shock in the rear and a conventional telescopic fork in the front until it was succeeded by an upside-down fork in 2005. Its brakes are dual-disc, Nissin twin piston in the front and single-disc, Nissin single piston in the rear. It was given the 16 in (410 mm) diameter front wheel and 17 in (430 mm), 180 section rear wheel setup from the Fireblade.

As a sport-oriented motorcycle that provides an upright riding position, it is considered a standard or "naked bike".

In 2000, Honda updated the Hornet, changing the 16 in (410 mm) front wheel for a 17 in (430 mm) to help corner stability and increasing the strength of the brake pass-over system on the front, making the brakes stronger. However, Honda did not increase the size of the fuel tank. A faired version, the CB600FS, was also introduced in 2000.

In 2003, Honda gave the CB600F version a make-over, with a larger fuel tank (17 L or 3.7 imp gal or 4.5 US gal as opposed to the former 16 L or 3.5 imp gal or 4.2 US gal), and 'sharper' styling. The CB600S faired version was discontinued.

In 2005, the instrument cluster was modernised, and more importantly, it was fitted with inverted front forks, to improve road-holding and cornering stability.

Honda took the Hornet to the United States and Canadian market beginning for the 2004 and 2006 model years respectively. It was called the 599.

The highly revised CB600F model came out in April 2007. The engine of the new motorcycle is a detuned version of the engine available in the 2007 CBR600RR giving a maximum output power of approximately 102 bhp (76 kW).

In 2011, the model got a facelift. The headlight assembly was changed and the instrument cluster uses LCD. This bike shared many of the same components – swingarm, fork, frame, engine – as the Honda CBR600F that was reintroduced in 2011.

In November 2013, at the EICMA show, Honda debuted the all-new CB650F naked bike and CBR650F sport bike, to replace the outgoing CB600F Hornet in 2014.

In 2022, Honda announced the new Honda Hornet (CB 750 S) as the successor to the CB600F Hornet in Europe.

== Specifications ==
	1998-1999	2000-2002	2003-2004	2005-2006	2007–2013
Locations
Model ID	Europe (CB600F Hornet)	Europe (CB600F Hornet) & North America (599)			
Engine
Engine Type	599 cc (36.6 cu in) liquid-cooled 4-stroke 16-valve DOHC inline-4				
Bore/Stroke	65.0 mm × 45.2 mm (2.56 in × 1.78 in)				67.0 mm × 42.5 mm (2.64 in × 1.67 in)
Compression Ratio	12.0:1				
Max Power Output	94.69 bhp (70.61 kW) at 12,000 rpm	94 bhp (70 kW) at 12,000 rpm	95 bhp (71 kW) at 12,000 rpm 80.4 hp (60.0 kW)(rear wheel)		102 bhp (76 kW) at 12,000 rpm
Max Torque	46.3 lbf⋅ft (62.76 N⋅m) @ 9,500 rpm	45.6 lbf⋅ft (61.78 N⋅m) @ 10,000 rpm	46.5 lbf⋅ft (63 N⋅m) @ 10,000 rpm 41.7 lb⋅ft (56.5 N⋅m) (rear wheel)		46.8 lbf⋅ft (63.5 N⋅m) @ 10,500 rpm
Valve Train	DOHC; four valves per cylinder				
Carburetion	Four 34.0 mm (1.34 in) slanted flat-slide CV				PGM-FI electronic fuel injection
Ignition	Computer-controlled digital with electronic advance				Computer-controlled digital transistorised with electronic advance
Drivetrain
Transmission	Six-speed				
Final Drive	#525 O-ring-sealed chain				
Chassis/Suspension/Brakes
Front Suspension	41 mm (1.6 in) telescopic fork; 125 mm (4.9 in) travel	41 mm (1.6 in) telescopic fork; 120 mm (4.7 in) travel	41 mm (1.6 in) telescopic fork; 110 mm (4.3 in) travel	41 mm (1.6 in) inverted telescopic fork	
Rear Suspension	Single shock with seven-position spring-preload adjustability; 128 mm (5.0 in) travel				
Front Brakes	Dual full-floating 296 mm (11.7 in) discs with twin-piston calipers.			Dual full-floating 296 mm (11.7 in) discs with twin-piston calipers. ABS optional.	
Rear Brakes	Single 220 mm (8.7 in) disc with single-piston caliper.				Single 240 mm (9.4 in) disc with single-piston caliper. ABS optional.
Front Tire	130/70ZR16	120/70ZR-17 radial			
Rear Tire	180/55ZR-17 radial				
Dimensions
Rake	25.5 degrees				25 degrees
Trail	96.0 mm (3.78 in)				99.0 mm (3.90 in)
Wheelbase	1,419.86 mm (55.900 in)	1,424.94 mm (56.100 in)	1,420.0 mm (55.91 in)	1,425.0 mm (56.10 in)	1,435.1 mm (56.50 in)
Seat Height	795 mm (31.3 in)		795–790 mm (31.3–31.1 in)		800 mm (31 in)
Dry Weight	176 kg (388 lb)	176–181 kg (388–399 lb)	401 lb (182 kg)	404 lb (183 kg)	173 kg (381 lb)
Wet Weight			202 kg (446 lb)		198 kg (437 lb), ABS: 203 kg (448 lb)
Fuel Capacity	16 L (3.5 imp gal; 4.2 US gal)		17 L (3.7 imp gal; 4.5 US gal)		19 L (4.2 imp gal; 5.0 US gal)

== See also ==
- Honda Hornet (disambiguation)
