= Honda Dream CB250 =

Motorcycle

- Manufacturer: Honda
- Production: 1968–1973 (K0 to K4)
- Predecessor: Honda CB72 Hawk
- Class: Sport bike or standard
- Engine: 249 cc (15.2 cu in), SOHC, 4 stroke, air-cooled, upright twin
- Bore / stroke: 56 mm × 50.6 mm (2.20 in × 1.99 in)
- Top speed: 160 km/h (99 mph) (claimed)
- Transmission: 5-speed manual transmission, chain final drive
- Frame type: Semi-double cradle
- Suspension: Front: telescopic fork Rear: swingarm
- Brakes: Front and rear drum
- Dimensions: L: 82.3 in (2,090 mm); W: 30.5 in (770 mm)
- Seat height: 31.3 in (800 mm)
- Weight: 160 kg (350 lb) (claimed) (dry)

The Honda Dream CB250 was a standard motorcycle made by Honda in 1968 and 1969 and sold only in Japan. It had a 249 cc (15.2 cu in) air-cooled, parallel twin, SOHC, four-stroke with a claimed 30 horsepower (22 kW) at 10,500 rpm. It was Honda's first 250 cc capacity motorcycle with vertical cylinders, and a 5-speed transmission.

== History ==
The CB250 was created to replace the CB72 Hawk (the larger capacity Superhawk CB77 was replaced by the CB350). There was also an export version, named CB250 Super Sport. The main differences between the two versions were the style and colour of the fuel tank, head light, filter and suspension covers. The rare Japanese model, known as CB72 style, had a classic chromed silver tank and black covers while the popular export models, produced from 1968 to 1973, had a tank and covers finished in two toned candy colours.

Since the very first version, model code CB250 K0, Honda has produced many CB250 models. After the release of the revolutionary Honda CB750, the popularity of the CB250 helped Honda to become one of the world's top motorcycle producers.
