= Honda CB250F =

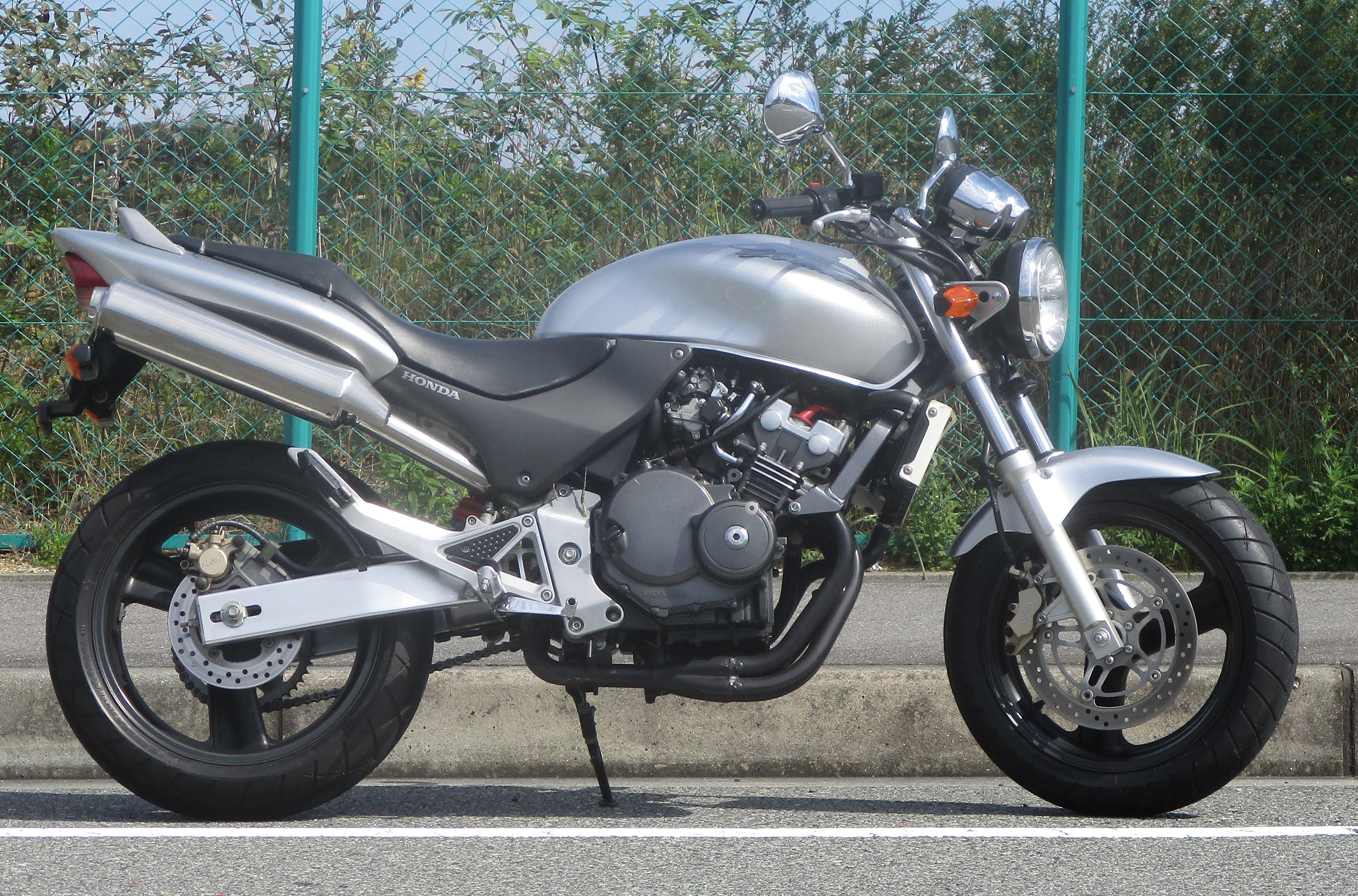
- Manufacturer: Honda
- Also called: Hornet 250
- Production: 1996–2007
- Predecessor: Honda CB250 Jade
- Class: Standard
- Engine: 249 cc (15.2 cu in) liquid-cooled, DOHC, 16-valve, inline 4-cylinder
- Bore / stroke: 48.5 mm × 33.8 mm (1.91 in × 1.33 in)
- Compression ratio: 11.5:1
- Top speed: 112 mph (180 km/h)
- Power: 40 hp (30 kW) @ 13000 rpm
- Torque: 23.53 N⋅m (17.35 lbf⋅ft) @ 11000 r/min
- Ignition type: CDI
- Transmission: 6-speed, manual 520 chain drive
- Frame type: Diamond (mono-backbone) frame
- Suspension: Front: 41mm telescopic forks Rear: Showa Monoshock with swingarm, preload adjustable.
- Brakes: Front: Hydraulic disc, Single 296mm disc with 4-piston Nissin caliper Rear: Hydraulic disc, Single 220mm disc with single-piston Nissin caliper
- Tires: Front: 130/70ZR 16 M/C; Rear: 180/55ZR 17M/C
- Seat height: 74.5 cm (29.3 in)
- Weight: 151 kg (333 lb) (dry); 168 kg (370 lb) (wet)
- Fuel capacity: 16 L (3.5 imp gal; 4.2 US gal)
- Related: Honda CB600F Hornet; Honda CB900F Hornet

The Honda CB250F also known as the Honda Hornet 250 is a standard motorcycle which was launched by Honda in 1996. It was initially only available in Japan, as a domestic model but was made available to the rest of the world as a grey import. Powered by a de-tuned version of the inline-four engine from the CBR250, it produces around 40 PS at 14,000 rpm to its redline of 16,000 rpm. This tuning allows the engine to provide more useful low-end power. The bike features a 6-speed transmission and a 16-litre fuel tank and in later models, a dual-tone coloured exterior. This bike is said to emit a peculiar high-pitched whine due to the gear driven camshafts used inside the engine.

Following reception from the Japanese market, the CB600F Hornet and CB900F Hornet were made available to the markets outside Japan.

== 2014 CB250F and CB300F ==
In 2014, Honda launched the entirely new single-cylinder CB250F (without the "Hornet" name), which is based on the CBR250R sport bike. Honda also launched the 287 cc version for the developed markets, called the CB300F, which is based on the CBR300R.

== See also ==
- Honda Hornet (disambiguation)
