= Honda CBR250R, CBR300R, and CB300F =

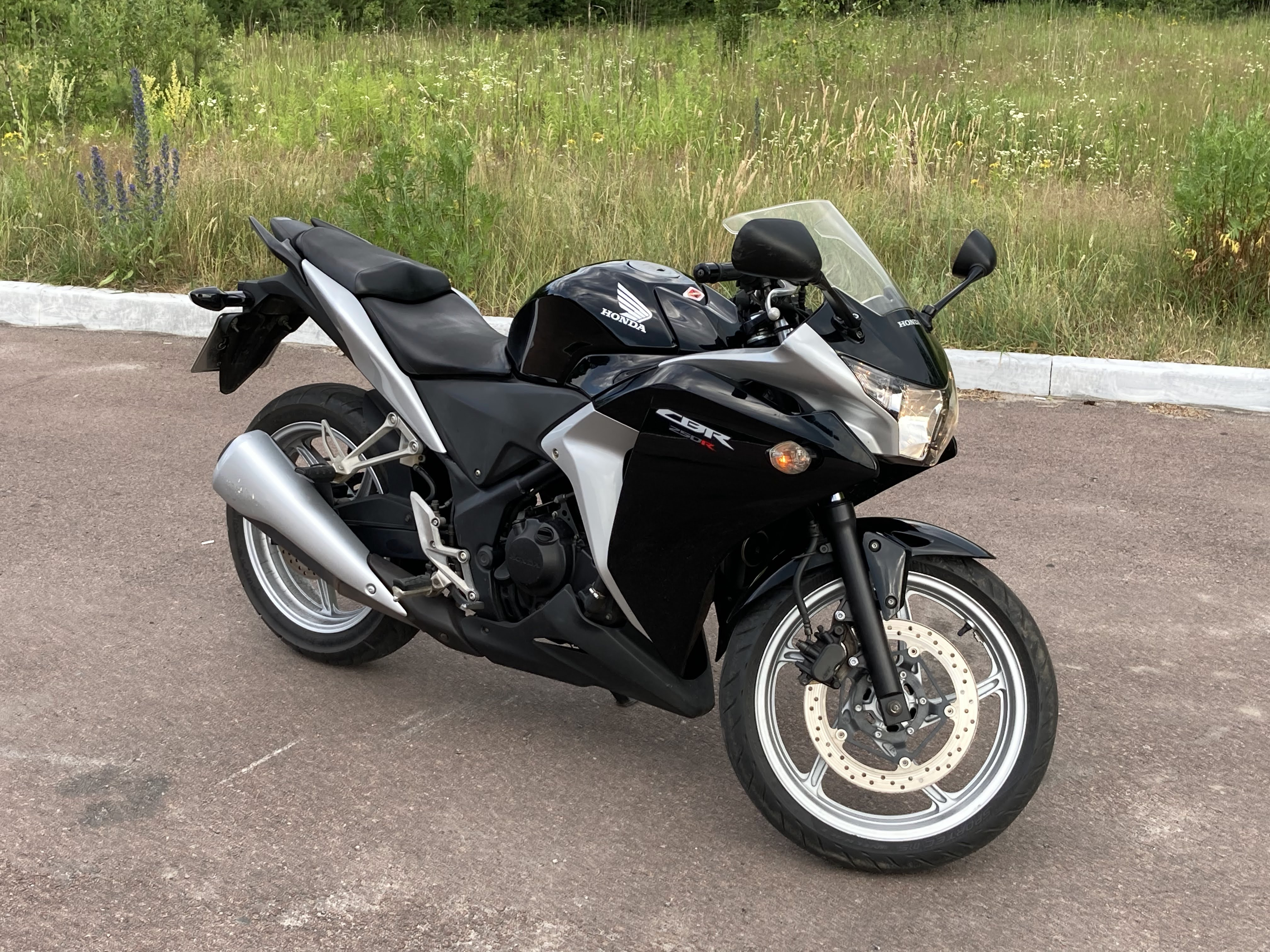
- Manufacturer: Honda
- Production: 2011–present
- Class: Sport
- Engine: 249.5–293.52 cc (15.225–17.912 cu in) single 4v
- Brakes: Single hydraulic disc front and rear.

The Honda CBR250R, CBR300R, and CB300F are lightweight 249.5–286 cc (15.23–17.45 cu in) displacement single-cylinder motorcycles made by Honda since 2011.

== CBR250R ==
CBR250R
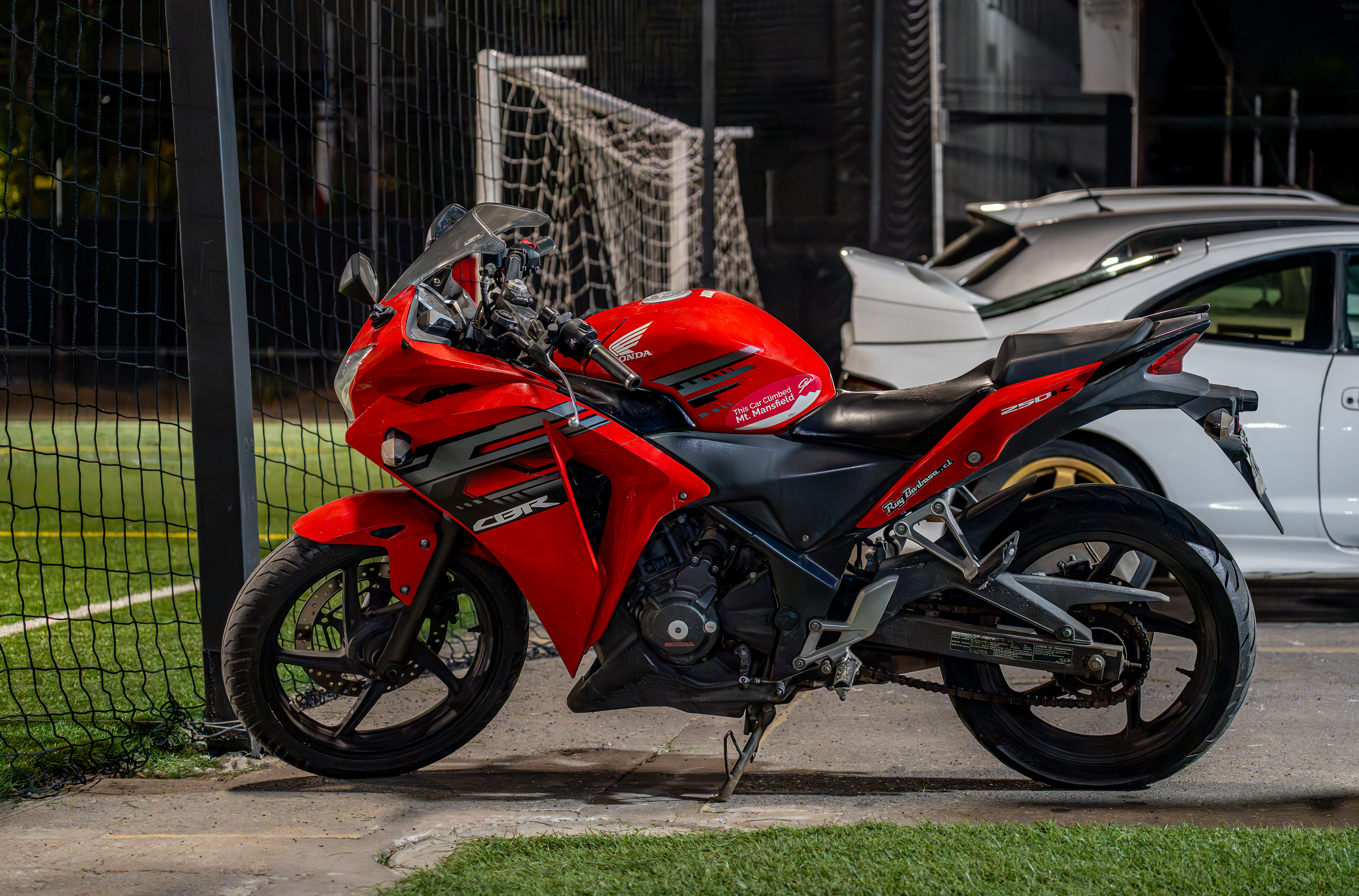
- Production: 2011–2013; 2011–2021 (Japan / Malaysia)
- Assembly: Samut Prakan, Thailand; Manesar, India
- Predecessor: CBR250R
- Successor: CBR300R
- Class: Sport
- Engine: 249.5 cc (15.23 cu in) DOHC liquid-cooled
- Bore / stroke: 76.0 mm × 55.0 mm (2.99 in × 2.17 in)
- Compression ratio: 10.7:1
- Top speed: 87 mph (140 km/h); 91.2 mph (146.8 km/h)
- Power: 23.7 hp (17.7 kW) @ 9,900 rpm (rear wheel); 21.9 hp (16.3 kW) @ 8,500 rpm 26.7 hp (19.9 kW) @ 8,500 rpm
- Torque: 12.7 lb⋅ft (17.2 N⋅m) @ 7,400 rpm (rear wheel); 14.65 lb⋅ft (19.86 N⋅m) @ 6,750 rpm
- Ignition type: CDI
- Transmission: Constant mesh 6-speed chain drive manual
- Frame type: Steel twin spar diamond, engine stressed
- Suspension: Front: non-adjustable 38 mm telescopic fork Rear: swingarm, 5-way adj. Unit Pro-link monoshock
- Brakes: Optional Combined ABS
- Tires: Front: 110/70-17M/C; Rear: 140/70-17M/C
- Rake, trail: 25°, 95 mm (3.7 in)
- Wheelbase: 1,370 mm (54 in)
- Dimensions: L: 2,035 mm (80.1 in); W: 720 mm (28 in); H: 1,125 mm (44.3 in)
- Seat height: 780 mm (31 in)
- Weight: 153 kg (337 lb) (non-ABS) (dry); 161 kg (355 lb) (non-ABS), 165 kg (364 lb) (ABS) (claimed); 166 kg (366 lb) (ABS) (wet)
- Fuel capacity: 13 L (2.9 imp gal; 3.4 US gal)
- Fuel consumption: 4.1 L/100 km (69 mpg_{‑imp}; 57 mpg_{‑US}); 4.16 L/100 km (67.9 mpg_{‑imp}; 56.5 mpg_{‑US})
- Turning radius: 2.5 m (8 ft 2 in)

The 249.5 cc (15.23 cu in) CBR250R was made from 2011 to 2013 for all Honda markets except Japan and Malaysia, where production continued after 2013. Originally intended primarily for the Thai and Indian markets, the 250R was sold worldwide, including in developed countries in Europe, North America and elsewhere. There was no CBR250R 2014 model in any markets except Japan and Malaysia, but in late 2014 for the 2015 model year, Honda added a larger displacement versions to succeed the CBR250R to keep pace with competitors, the CBR300R sport bike, and CB300F standard bike in all markets except Japan, India and Malaysia where only the CBR250R is sold.

=== Regional markets ===
In developing countries where typical motorcycles are 125–150 cc (7.6–9.2 cu in) displacement, the larger 249.5 cc (15.23 cu in) CBR250R is at the higher end of the sport bike range, looking similar to much more powerful sporting machines with its full fairing in Honda's new layered style that was introduced on the 2008 CBR1000RR Fireblade and 2010 VFR1200F. In wealthier industrialized countries, the CBR250R enters at the opposite end of the market, as a budget priced beginner or utility bike, practical and fuel efficient, but with limited sporting pretensions.

In the US, the new CBR250R is the first major competition the Kawasaki Ninja 250R has faced since the early 1990s. The CBR250R has optional mechanical combined anti-lock brakes, which is unusual at its price. But it does not have slipper clutch, traction control system, Cornering ABS, cornering lights, adaptive brake light, or engine braking control.

=== Design ===
The CBR250R closely follows the style of the VFR1200F, notable for its Y-shaped headlight and prominent middle cowl, which creates a layered look. This new direction in Honda design debuted at Intermot in 2008 with the V4 Concept Model, and the 2008 CBR1000RR Fireblade.

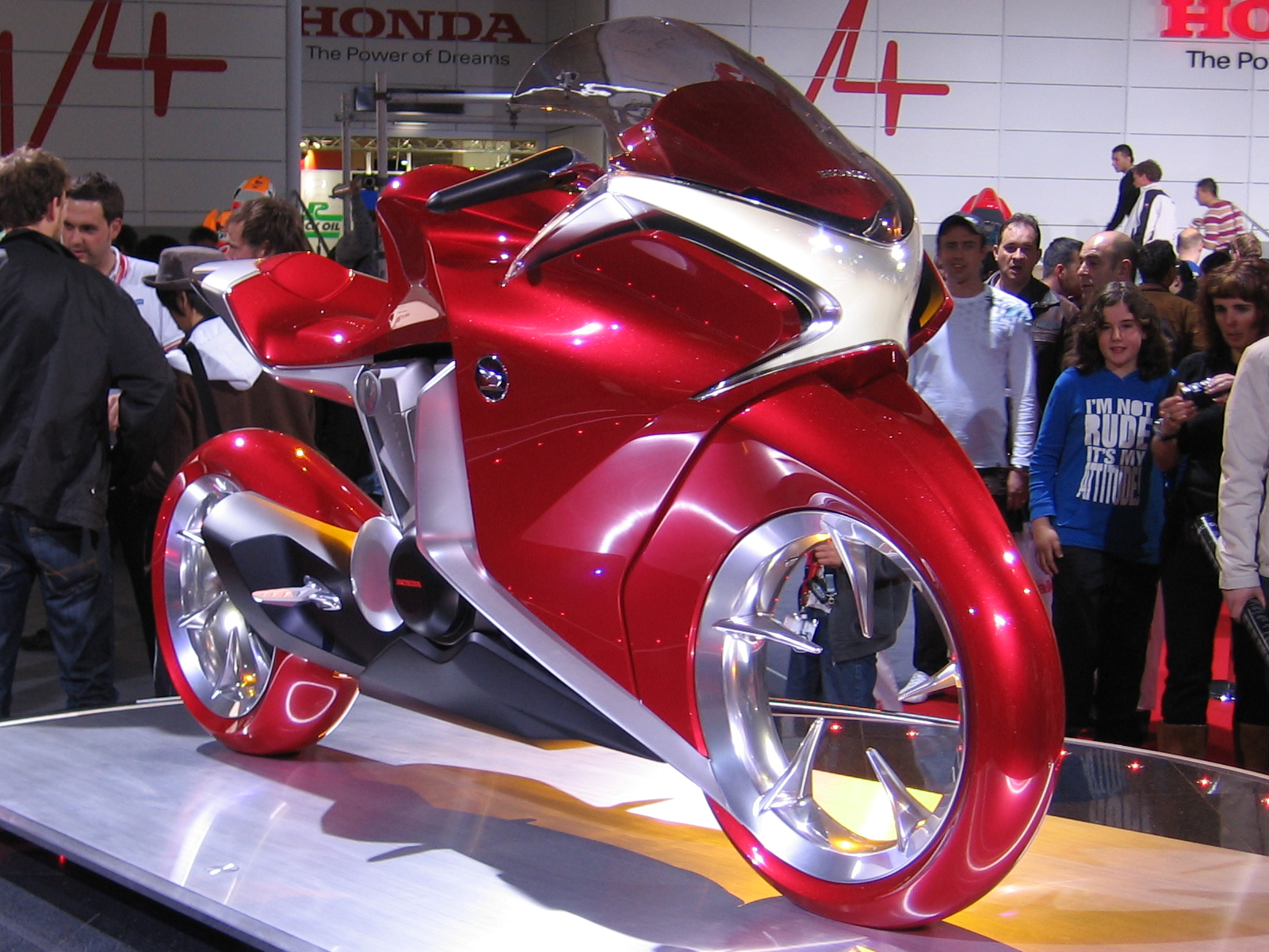
The V4 Concept Model at Intermot 2008

Motorcycle Consumer News design columnist Glynn Kerr observed that new direction in bike design fits the pattern of motorcycle trends imitating, but lagging behind, car styling, in that motorcycles are shifting away from sharp, "lithe", dart-like shapes of the 2010s toward a heavier, "chunky" style with a higher, blunter nose, and, in cars, a "high waisted" middle with short windows and thicker pillars. Kerr cites the Chrysler 300 as the best example, as well as smaller cars like the Audi A3 and Suzuki Swift, commenting that, "aggression now comes from appearing strong and assertive, rather than light and dart-like... the arrow has been replaced by the hammer."

In motorcycles this translates into a heavy front, reverse rake angle headlight, and the use of little or no color on the rear half of the bike to spotlight the front one-fourth of the bike. In this aspect, Kerr also sees influence from the 1994 Morbidelli V8, the 1991 Yamaha TDM850, and Honda's DN-01 of 2005. On the 2008 CBR1000RR, Kerr thought the dominant vertical line produced an awkward, top heavy look that played against traditional race replica styling of body lines sloping downwards towards the front. The 2010 VFR1200F was visually more successful because the new style better suited the greater proportions of a touring motorcycle, and in spite of Honda's third iteration of the style being a much smaller bike, nonetheless Kerr said, "the latest CBR250R carries the look even better than its big brother." The Ottawa Citizen's review by David Booth said the CBR250R looked better than the VFR1200F as well, commenting that, "Where the various bulges of the big VFR are a little too Jessica Rabbit-like over-the-top, the little CBR250R styling is far more subtle and really looks the classier of the two."

=== Critical reception ===
Reviews of the CBR250R generally rate its performance in comparison to its main competitor, which in the US and Canada is the Kawasaki Ninja 250R. The Hyosung GT250, rebadged as the ATK GT250 for 2011, is also a potential competitor in those markets, although it fares poorly in comparison. In India, the Ninja 250R and Hero Honda Karizma R are the leading competition. Though lower in peak power and with a slower top speed than the Ninja 250, the CBR was lauded for having more torque available at lower engine speeds, meaning that it was easier to accelerate from low speed and pulling away required less noise and drama, since the Ninja had to be revved to 9,000 rpm and above to make use of its greater power. This made the CBR250R more pleasant and forgiving to ride than the sportier, but more challenging, Ninja. Complaints from The Economic Times of Mumbai included a tendency to stand up if the rider makes a sloppy mid-corner correction, and brakes and suspension not up to the standards of a track bike. The Indian reviewer also perceived the 161 kg (355 lb) wet weight as "not so light", while American journalists considered it a featherweight, "incredibly agile, flickable ... almost too light," at 16.5 lb (7.5 kg) lighter than the Ninja 250R. The Ninja 250R's brakes had a better, more linear feel with stronger initial bite and could stop from 60 to 0 mph (97 to 0 km/h) in 121.5 ft (37.0 m), while the CBR250R, with a stopping distance of 123.4 ft (37.6 m), was lauded for its combined anti-lock brake option, a boon to beginners in spite of the slightly shorter braking distance achievable on the Ninja 250R by a skilled sport rider. Kevin Ash, at 6 ft 3 in (1.91 m), found the dimensions comfortable for someone of his height, while David Booth cautioned it could be cramped for taller riders.

In one head-to-head comparison, MotorcycleUSA judged the Ninja 250R to be the better bike due to its superior speed and handling. The testers at Motorcycle Consumer News found the CBR250R to be the better choice, given the needs of its presumed prospective buyers in the US, beginners and those looking for a practical motorcycle for long commutes, though "if sheer performance is all you're after" without regard for fuel efficiency, then the Ninja 250R might be preferable.

=== Production ===
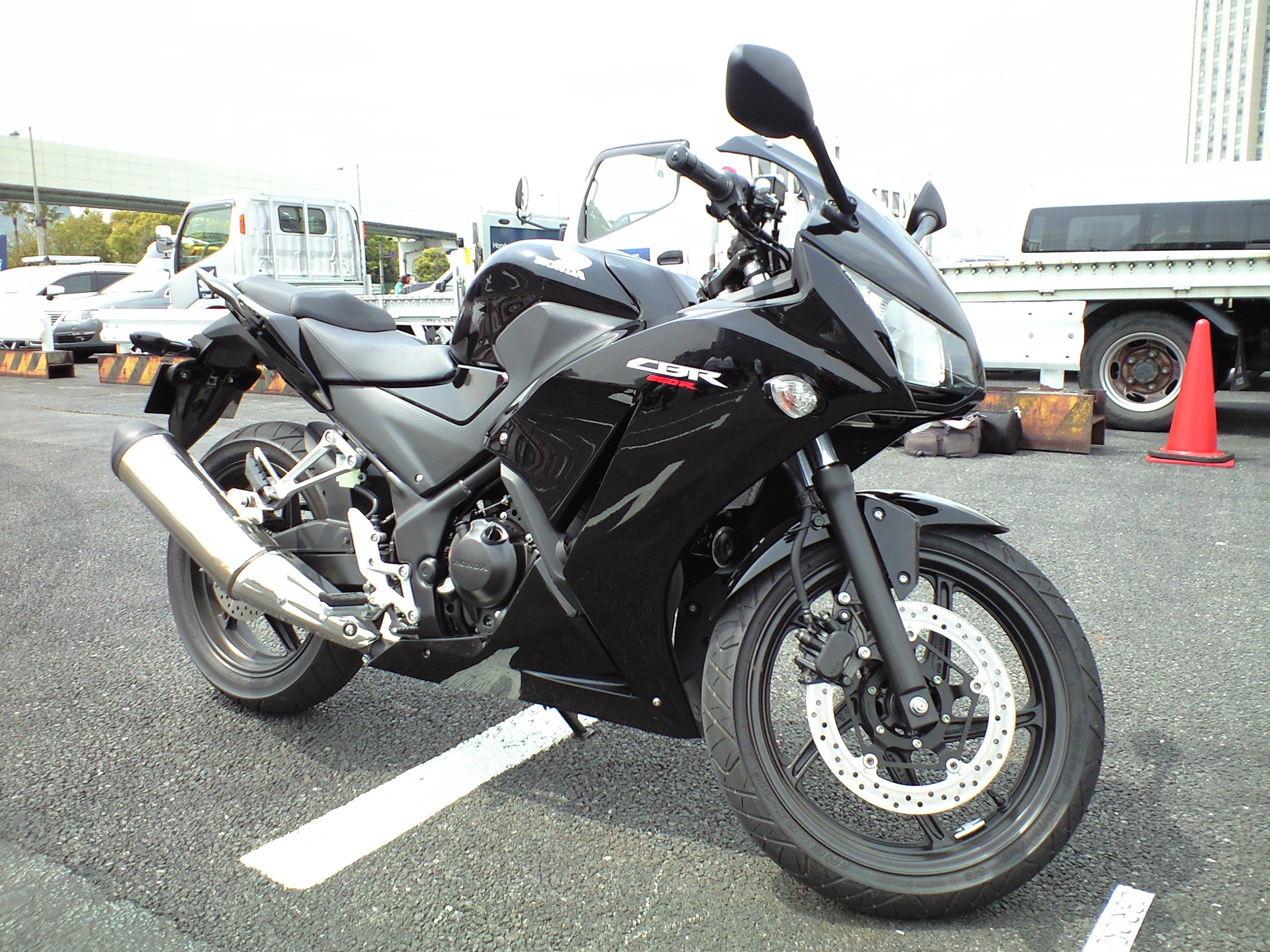
2014 Honda CBR250R

The production model was unveiled in the Thailand International Motor Expo 2010 on November 27, 2010, Hong Kong's Central District on November 28, 2010, and EICMA 2010.

Global models of the CBR250R were produced by Thai Honda Manufacturing in Thailand, with sales beginning in November 2010, followed by spring 2011 in Japan. Indian and South America models were produced by Honda Motorcycle and Scooter India (HMSI) in India beginning in the spring of 2011.

== CBR300R ==
Honda CBR300R
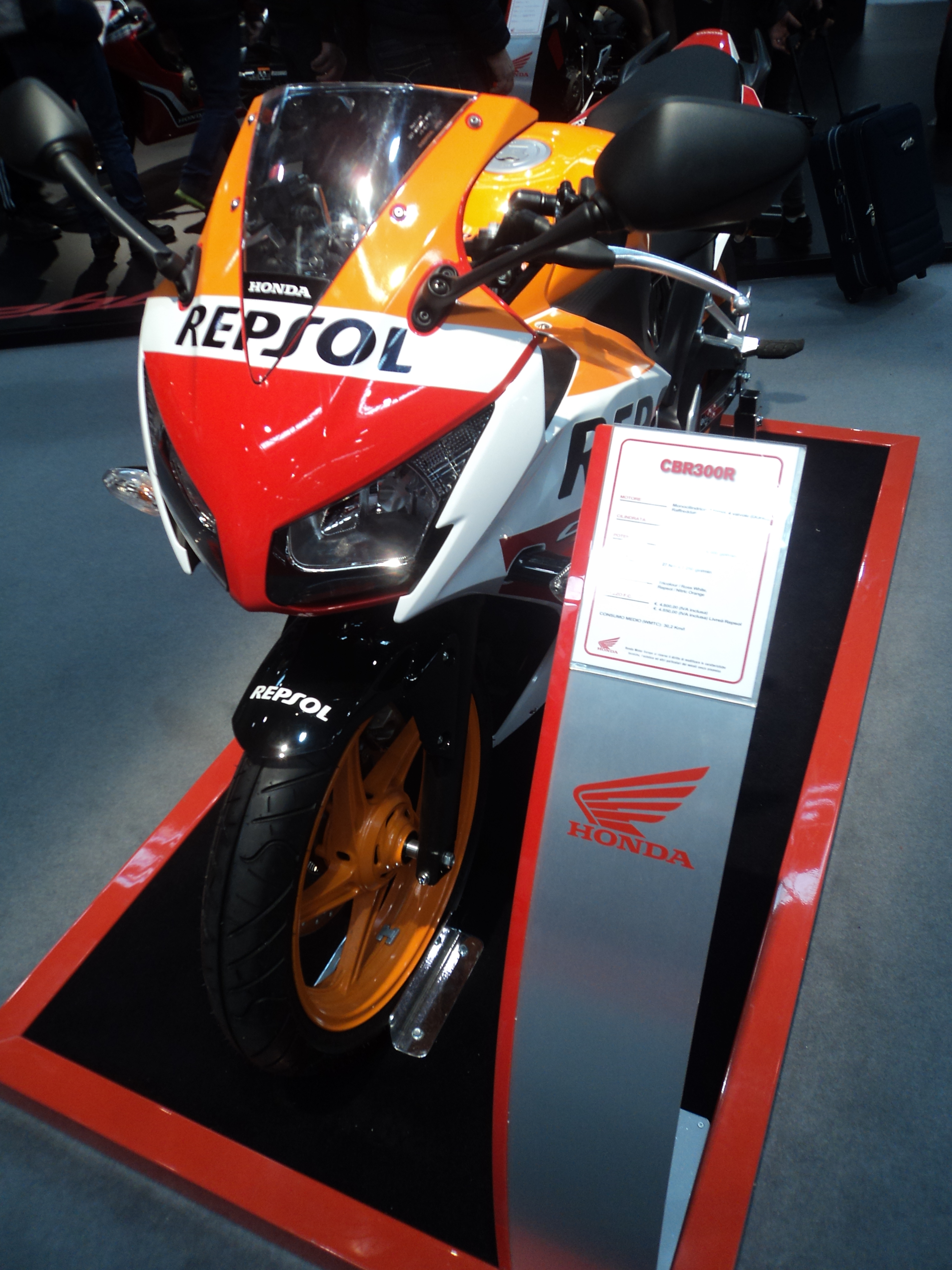
- Production: 2015–2023
- Assembly: Samut Prakan, Thailand
- Class: Sport bike
- Engine: 286 cc (17.5 cu in) DOHC liquid-cooled
- Bore / stroke: 76.0 mm × 63.0 mm (2.99 in × 2.48 in)
- Compression ratio: 10.7:1
- Power: 30.4 hp (22.7 kW) @ 8,500 rpm (claimed).
- Torque: 20 lb⋅ft (27 N⋅m) @ 7,250 rpm (claimed)
- Ignition type: CDI
- Transmission: Wet multiplate clutch, constant mesh 6-speed, chain drive
- Frame type: Steel twin spar diamond, engine stressed
- Suspension: Front: Non-adjustable 38 mm telescopic fork Rear: Steel swingarm, 5-way adjustable monoshock with Pro-Link
- Brakes: Optional Combined ABS
- Tires: Front: 110/70-17M/C; Rear: 140/70-17M/C
- Rake, trail: 25.3°, 98 mm (3.9 in)
- Wheelbase: 1,380 mm (54.3 in)
- Dimensions: L: 2,035 mm (80.1 in); W: 720 mm (28 in); H: 1,120 mm (44 in)
- Seat height: 780 mm (30.7 in)
- Weight: 162 kg (357 lb) (wet)
- Fuel capacity: 13 L; 2.8 imp gal (3.4 US gal)
- Fuel consumption: 3.3 L/100 km; 85 mpg_{‑imp} (71 mpg_{‑US}) (claimed)

In October 2013 the longer-stroke CBR300R was announced at the China International Motorcycle Trade Exhibition in Chongqing, with engine displacement increased from 249.6 to 286 cc (15.23 to 17.45 cu in) in response to Kawasaki's Ninja 300. Honda said the new model has increased horsepower, from 26 to 30.5 bhp (19.4 to 22.7 kW), and greater torque, from 17 to 20 lb⋅ft (23 to 27 N⋅m). An optional ABS upgrade is available for these models. The new CBR300R differs from the previous CBR250R in a number of ways. The fairing and headlight are restyled to more resemble the CBR RR line - a departure from the CBR250R resemblance to the VFR1200F. Further external changes include a new exhaust system and revised motor mounts, a new seat and side panels that aid in an easier reach to the ground and a slightly more sporty riding position. Internal changes include new piston, connecting rod and crankshaft along with increase in displacement and taller gearing for better cruising. Tires and suspension remain same as CBR250R.

It does not have Cornering ABS, cornering lights, adaptive brake light, traction control system, or engine braking control.

The CBR300R starts at a price of ฿151,690 (US$4,743.28) in Thailand.

=== Performance ===
The Honda CBR300R is capable of acceleration from 0–60 in 7.80 seconds. It has a braking distance of 138.9 feet from 60 to 0 mph.

== CB300F ==
Honda CB300F - first generation
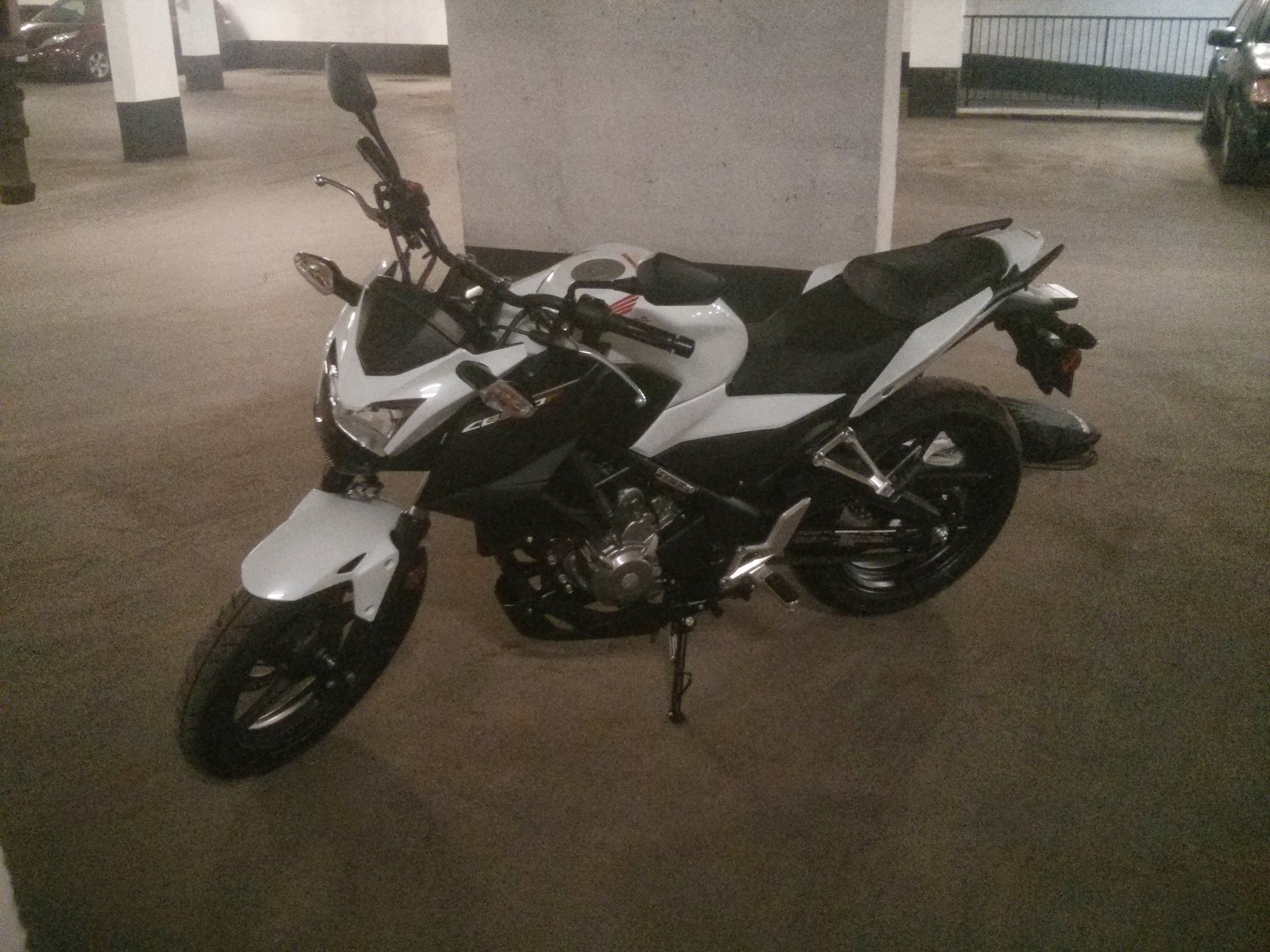
- Production: 2015–2021
- Assembly: Samut Prakan, Thailand
- Class: Naked bike
- Engine: 286 cc (17.5 cu in) DOHC liquid-cooled
- Bore / stroke: 76.0 mm × 63.0 mm (2.99 in × 2.48 in)
- Compression ratio: 10.7:1
- Power: 19 kW (26 hp) @ 8,500 rpm (@ Rear wheel)
- Torque: 27 N⋅m (20 lb⋅ft) @ 7,250 rpm (claimed)
- Ignition type: CDI
- Transmission: Wet multiplate clutch, constant mesh 6-speed, O-Ring sealed chain (final drive)
- Frame type: Steel twin spar diamond, engine stressed
- Suspension: Front: Non-adjustable 37 mm telescopic fork Rear: Steel swingarm, 5-way adjustable monoshock
- Brakes: Optional Combined ABS
- Tires: Front: 110/70-17M/C; Rear: 140/70-17M/C
- Rake, trail: 25.3°, 98 mm (3.9 in)
- Wheelbase: 1,380 mm (54.3 in)
- Seat height: 790 mm (31 in)
- Weight: 158 kg (348 lb) (wet)
- Fuel capacity: 13 L; 2.8 imp gal (3.4 US gal)
- Fuel consumption: 3.0 L/100 km; 94 mpg_{‑imp} (78 mpg_{‑US}) (2016-2021)

Honda CB300F - Second generation
- Production: 2022-present
- Assembly: Vithalapur, Ahmedabad, India
- Engine: 293.52 cc (17.912 cu in) SOHC oil-cooled
- Bore / stroke: 77.0 mm × 63.033 mm (3.0315 in × 2.4816 in)
- Compression ratio: 9.3:1
- Power: 18.2 kW (24.4 hp) @ 7,500 rpm
- Torque: 25.6 N⋅m (18.9 lbf⋅ft) @ 5,500 rpm
- Brakes: Dual-channel ABS
- Tires: Front: 110/70R-17M/C; Rear: 150/60R-17M/C
- Wheelbase: 1,390 mm (55 in)
- Dimensions: L: 2,084 mm (82.0 in); W: 765 mm (30.1 in); H: 1,075 mm (42.3 in)
- Seat height: 789 mm (31.1 in)
- Weight: 153 kg (337 lb) (wet)
- Fuel capacity: 14.1 L (3.1 imp gal; 3.7 US gal)

In 2015, a naked variant of the Honda CBR300R was launched. In this variant is available with 2 color choices colour red and white.

=== Design ===
The CB300F is a slightly lighter model with a more upright sitting position.

=== First generation ===
The CB300F weighs 158 kg (348 lb) wet. Most of its specifications are nearly the same as the CBR300R.

Combined ABS is optional.

=== Second generation ===
In 2022 assembly was moved to India.

The bike gets a new 293.52cc single-cylinder oil-cooled SOHC engine. It has a 6-speed gearbox with assist-and-slipper clutch.

It has LED lighting with hazard button, battery voltmeter, dual-channel ABS, a switchable traction control system and a USB charger. Bluetooth (including phone-based audio navigation, audio playback, handsfree calling, messaging, and weather) is optional.

But there is no longer a Combined ABS option.

The base model was released at an ex-showroom price of ₹225,900 (US$2,400) in India. The Bluetooth option costs ₹3,000 (US$32).
