= Honda CBR150R =

Sport bike

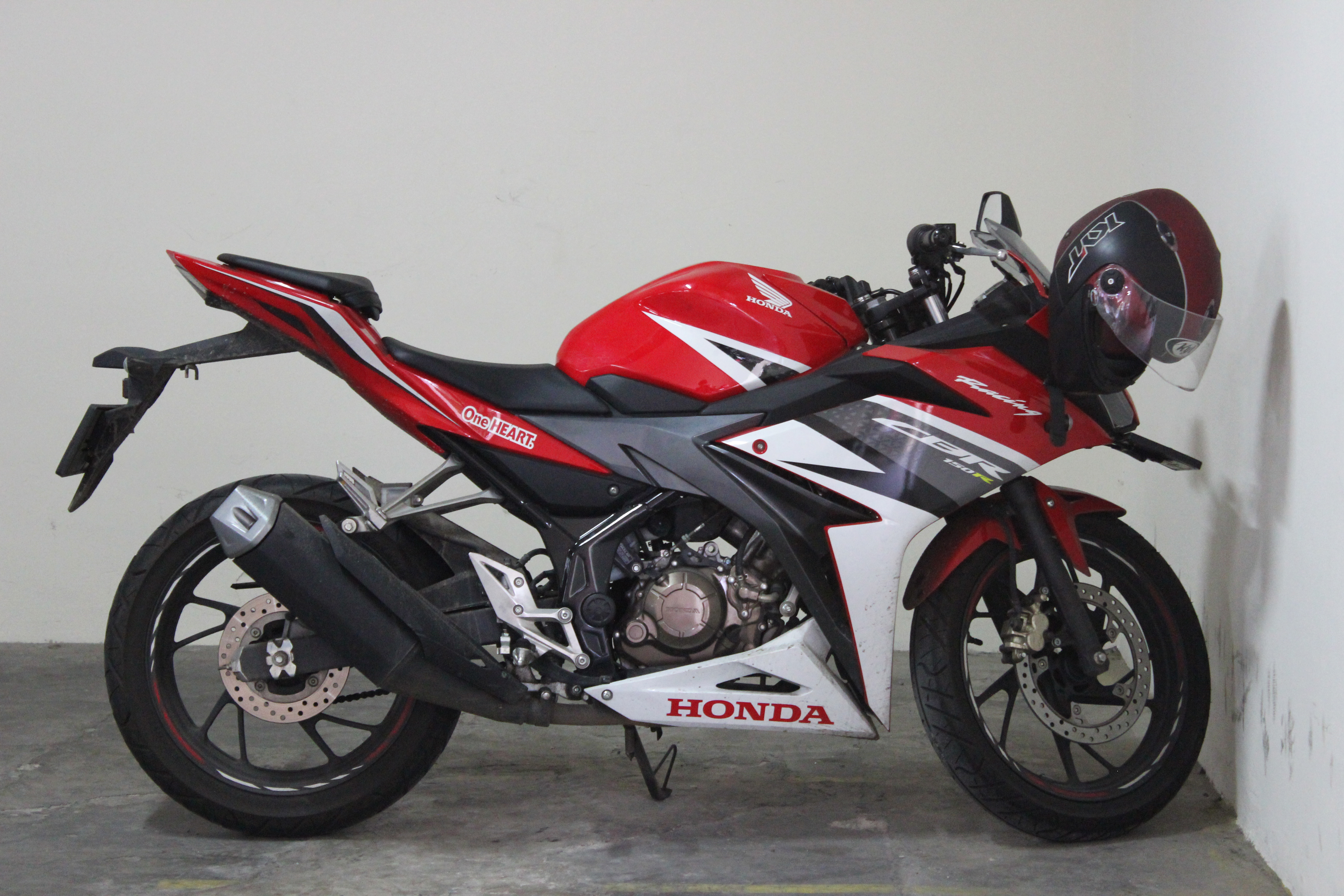
- Honda CBR150R
- Manufacturer: Honda
- Production: 2002–present
- Assembly: Thailand (A.P. Honda; 2002–2019); Indonesia: Karawang, West Java (Astra Honda Motor; 2014–present)
- Predecessor: Honda NSR150
- Class: Sport bike
- Related: Honda CBR125R; Honda CB150R Streetfire; Honda CB150R ExMotion/Streetster

The Honda CBR150R is a CBR series 150 cc (9.2 cu in) single-cylinder sport bike made by Honda. It is currently manufactured in Indonesia by Astra Honda Motor and previously in Thailand by A.P. Honda.

== History ==
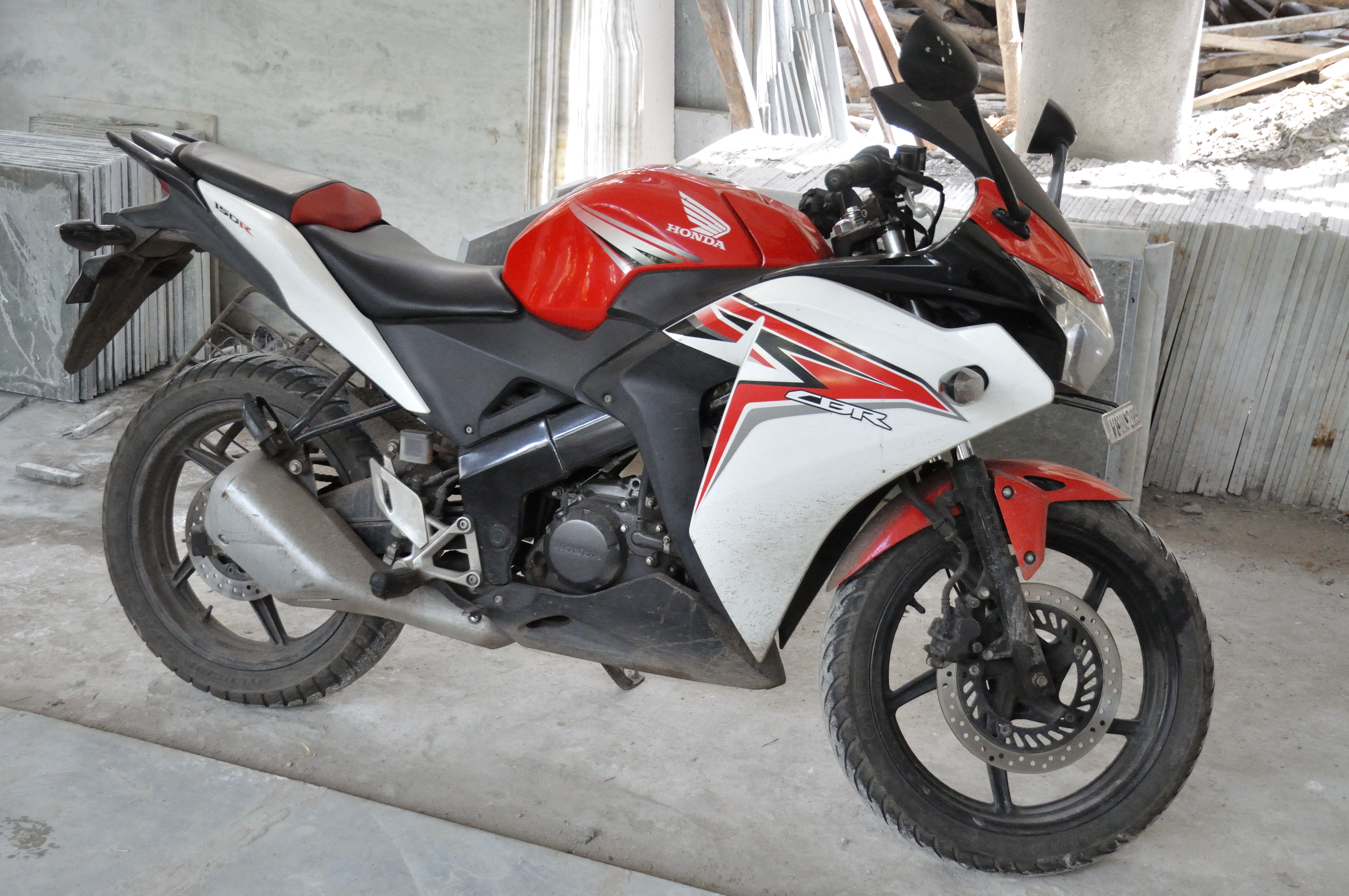
2010 Honda CBR150R (India)

The CBR150R was introduced by Honda as the successor to the 2-stroke NSR150. It has been sold in Thai market starting from 2002 and have been exported to many Asian countries and South Africa. A.P. Honda produces the new fuel-injected (PGM-FI) version in 2010, which has lower power than the carburetted version. The design was shared with the 2011 CBR250R, which in turn borrows from VFR1200F sports tourer. The CBR150R went on sale in India in March 2012. In 2014, Honda updated the CBR150R with the same body design as the CBR300R, which is inspired from the 2012 CBR1000RR. This update was applied to Indonesian market only, while other markets retained the old design. This model is also made locally by Astra Honda Motor. In 2016, Honda introduced a fully updated version of the CBR150R, which has the body inspired from the 2016 CBR500R. This version also has the new engine configuration since its introduction in 2002. Like the 2014 version, this variant is made and sold in Indonesia, and has been exported to the Philippines. In 2018, the ABS option made available in Indonesia, along with a slightly reworked body. This version is also sold in Thailand, replacing the previous locally assembled 2010 version since 2018.

=== 2014–2016 ===
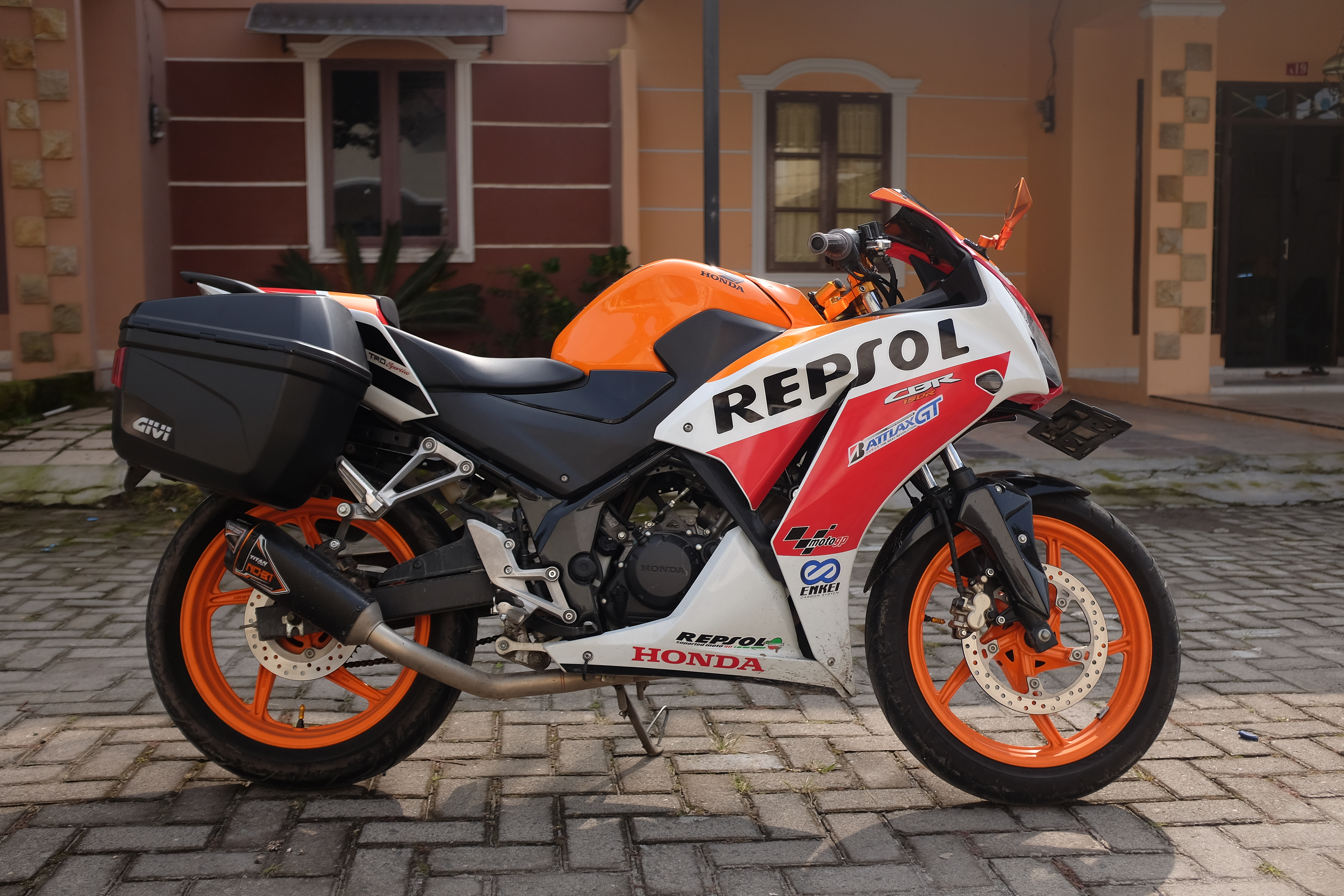
2014 Honda CBR150R with aftermarket exhaust and panniers (Indonesia).

In September 2014, a subsidiary of Honda in Indonesia, Astra Honda Motor released the updated version of the CBR150R for Indonesian market. This model has same body design as the CBR300R, which is inspired from the 2012 CBR1000RR and was targeted to replace Thai version of the CBR150R. The bike also uses a diamond truss frame, unlike the previous twin-spar one. The rear bodywork remains the same. Previously, Astra Honda Motor relied on importation of the Thai version for its market.

=== 2016–2021 ===
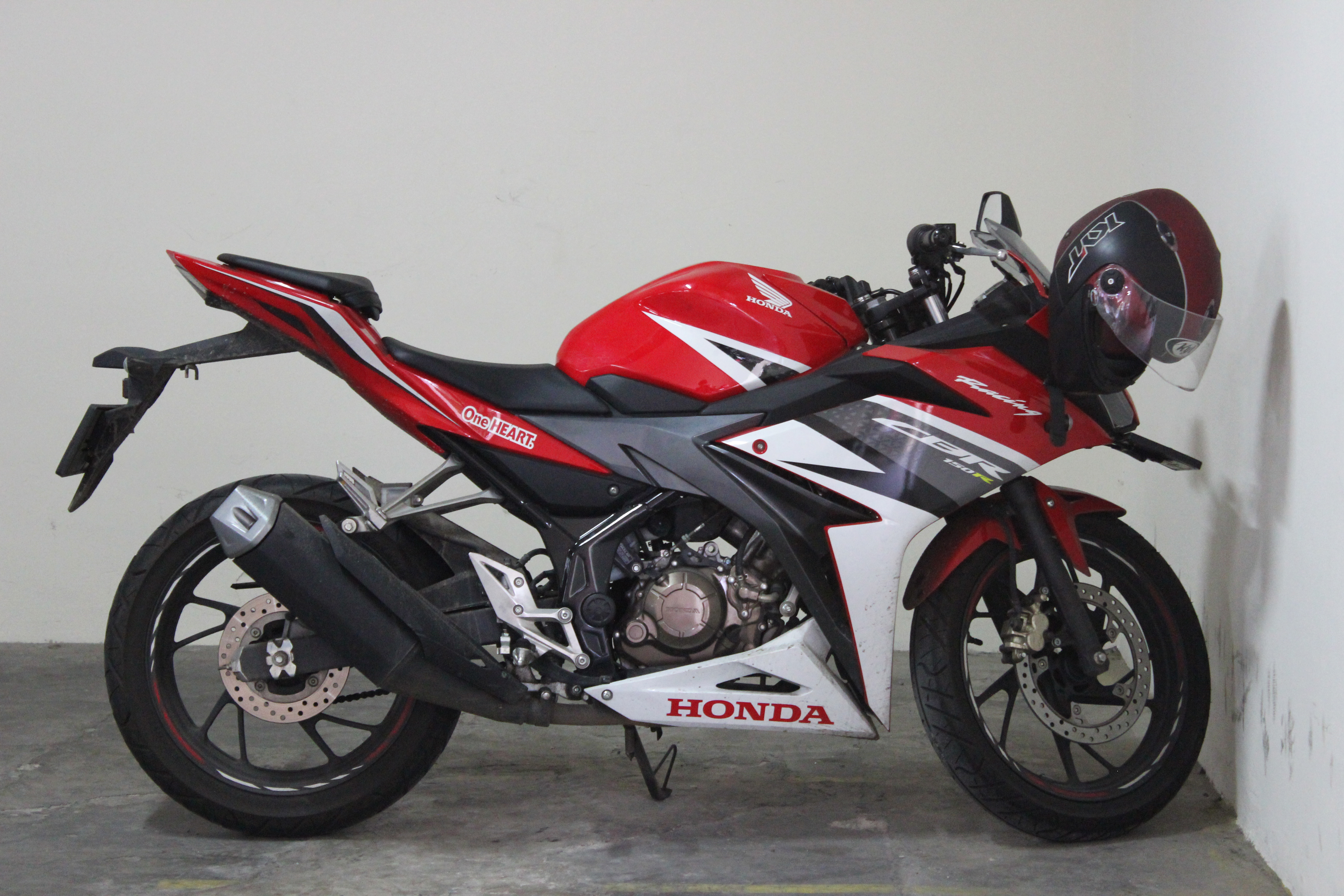
2016 Honda CBR150R (Indonesia)

In February 2016, Astra Honda Motor released a fully updated version of the CBR150R. Updates includes new engine configuration, different body design, which is inspired from the 2016 CBR500R, all-LED lighting system, and all-digital instrument panel design. The engine is now shared with the 2015 CB150R, 2015 Sonic 150R, and 2016 Winner. The weight is reduced by 8 kg (18 lb).

In October 2018, the CBR150R got a minor update for 2019. The ABS variant was added, which its system is integrated to emergency stop signal, along with a redesigned visor (which is higher), cast wheel and disc brake design and 5-way preload adjustable front and rear suspension.

In March 2019, the Indonesian-built CBR150R made its debut in Thailand, replacing the previous locally assembled 2010 version. In January 2021, this model was replaced by new generation in Indonesia, but still available in other markets.

==== Performance ====
Some performance tests listed here were conducted by Otomotif tabloid from Indonesia in April 2016.

Parameter	Result
0–60 km/h (37.3 mph)	4.3 s
0–80 km/h (49.7 mph)	7.2 s
0–100 km/h (62.1 mph)	11.9 s
0–100 m (328.1 ft)	7.2 s @ 80.3 km/h (49.9 mph)
0–201 m (1/8 mile)	11.3 s @ 97.9 km/h (60.8 mph)
0–402 m (1/4 mile)	18.1 s @ 114.4 km/h (71.1 mph)
Top speed (on speedometer)	138 km/h (85.7 mph)
Top speed (Racelogic)	129.5 km/h (80.5 mph)
Fuel consumption	42.4 km/L (119.8 mpg_{‑imp}; 99.7 mpg_{‑US})

=== 2021–present ===
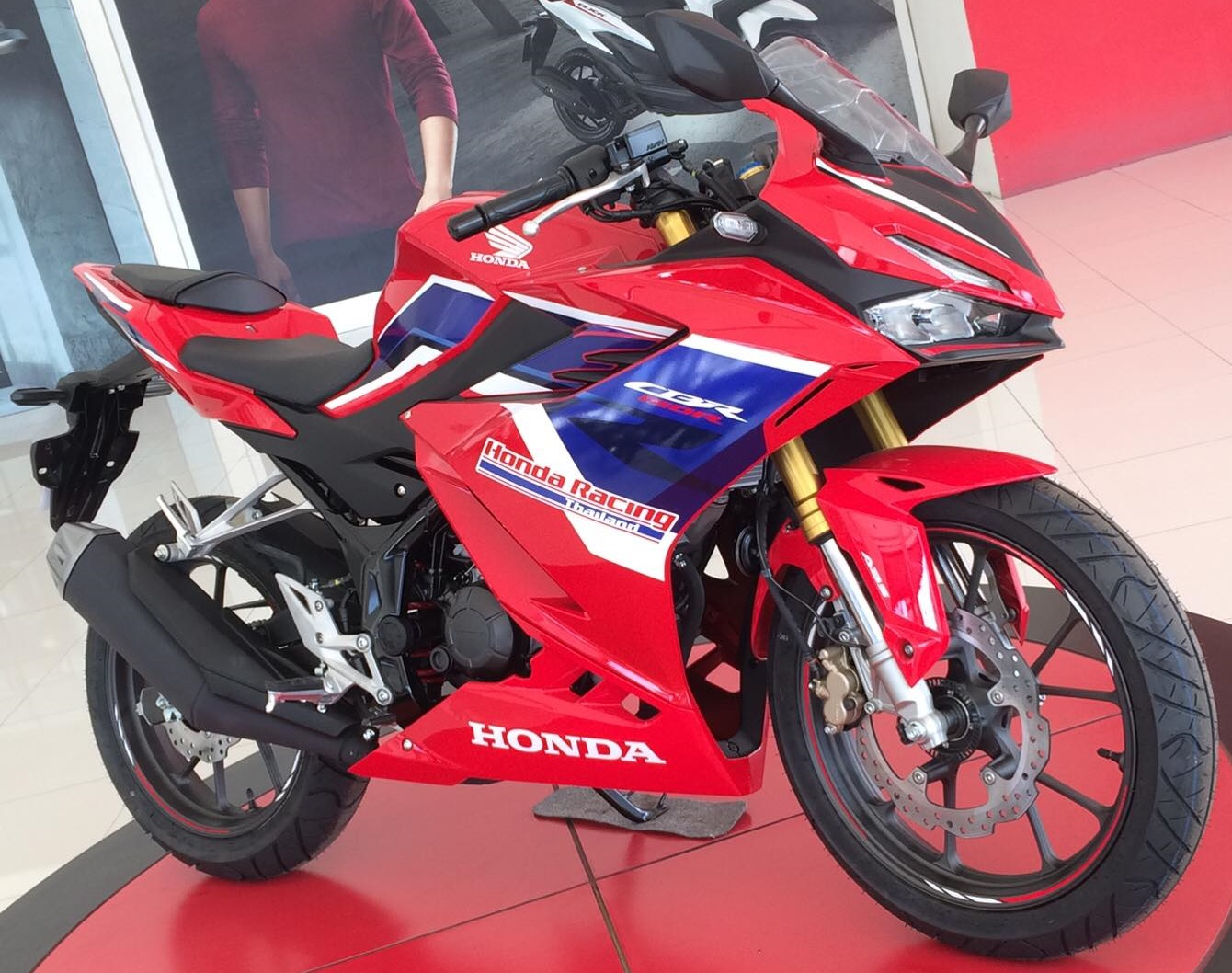
2021 Honda CBR150R

The fourth generation CBR150R was released on 12 January 2021. Based on heavily revised previous generation, this generation has similar design as the 2017 CBR250RR and equipped with front upside down suspension as standard. It has 18 hp, 14.4Nm torque and 151 kg curb weight.

== Specifications ==
Specification	2002–2011	2011–2019	2014–2016 (K45A)	2016–present (K45G/N)	2021–present (K45R)
Engine & transmission
Layout	4-stroke 4-valve DOHC single-cylinder				
Capacity	149.5 cc (9.12 cu in)			149.16 cc (9.102 cu in)	
Bore × stroke	63.5 mm × 47.2 mm (2.50 in × 1.86 in)			57.3 mm × 57.8 mm (2.26 in × 2.28 in)	
Compression ratio	11.0:1			11.3:1	
Cooling system	Liquid-cooled				
Carburation	Carburettor	PGM-FI fuel injection			
Starter	Electric				
Transmission	6-speed constant mesh				
Final drive	Chain				
Cycle parts & suspension
Frame	Steel twin-spar		Steel diamond with truss structure		
Front suspension	Conventional 31 mm (1.2 in) telescopic fork				Upside down
Front tyre	80/90–17	100/80–17			
Front brakes	Single 276 mm (10.9 in) disc with axially-mounted 2-piston caliper				
Rear suspension	Steel swingarm with monoshock		Steel swingarm with monoshock and Pro-Link		
Rear tyre	100/80–17	130/70–17			
Rear brakes	Single 220 mm (8.7 in) disc with single-piston caliper				
ABS	N/A			Available since 2018 (only for top model)	
Dimensions
Length	1,910 mm (75 in)	1,977 mm (77.8 in)	1,995 mm (78.5 in)	1,983 mm (78.1 in)	
Width	652 mm (25.7 in)	695 mm (27.4 in)	711 mm (28.0 in)	694 mm (27.3 in)	700 mm (28 in)
Height	1,065 mm (41.9 in)	1,130 mm (44 in)	1,117 mm (44.0 in)	1,038 mm (40.9 in) (2016); 1,077 mm (42.4 in) (2018)	1,077 mm (42.4 in)
Seat height	787 mm (31.0 in)	793 mm (31.2 in)	786 mm (30.9 in)	787 mm (31.0 in)	782 mm (30.8 in)
Wheelbase	1,286 mm (50.6 in)	1,310 mm (52 in)	1,296 mm (51.0 in)	1,310 mm (52 in)	
Ground clearance	172 mm (6.8 in)	185 mm (7.3 in)	160 mm (6.3 in)	166 mm (6.5 in)	160 mm (6.3 in)
Fuel capacity	10 L (2.2 imp gal; 2.6 US gal)	13 L (2.9 imp gal; 3.4 US gal)	13.2 L (2.9 imp gal; 3.5 US gal)	12 L (2.6 imp gal; 3.2 US gal)	
