= Honda Winner =

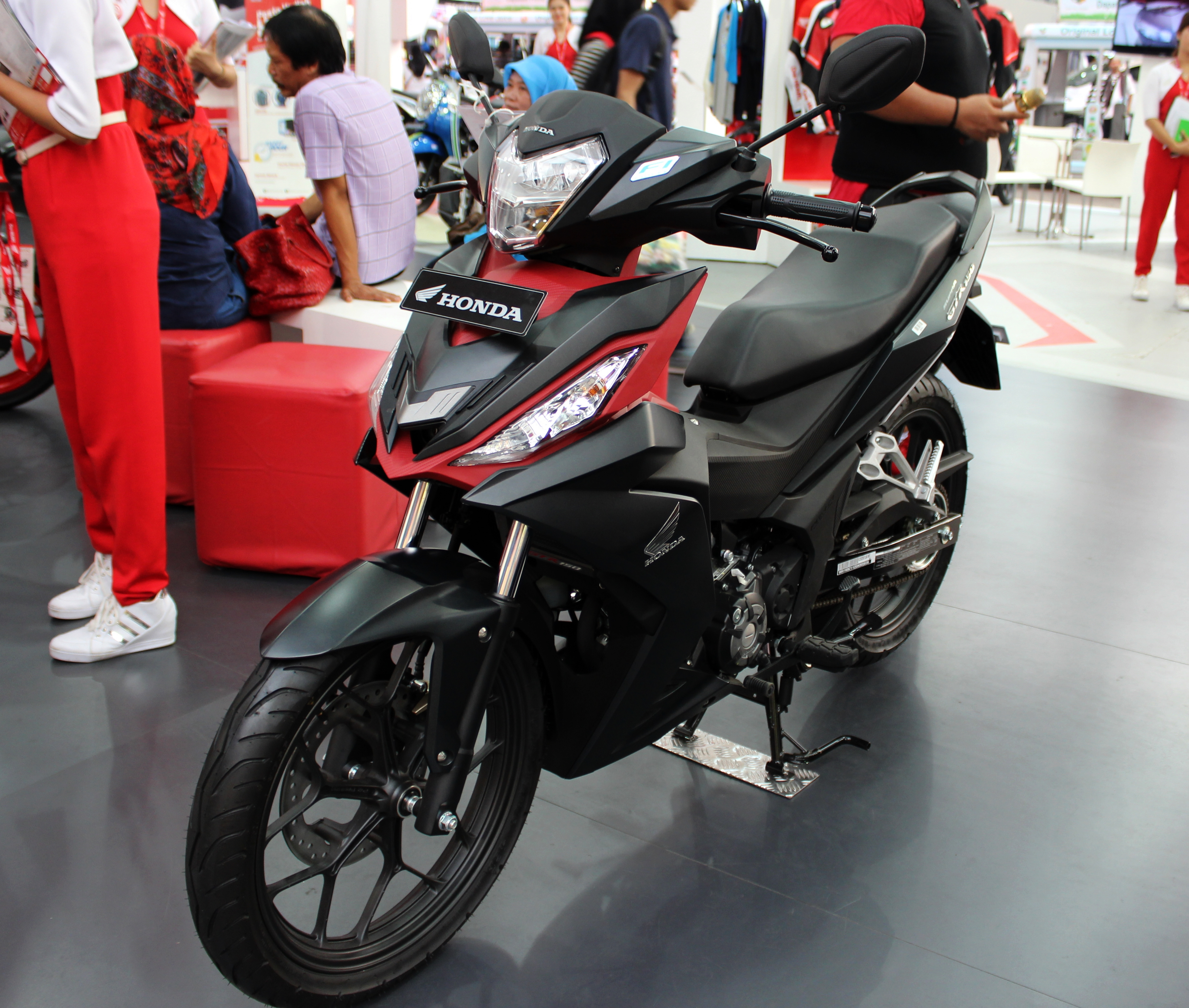
- Honda Winner
- Manufacturer: Honda
- Also called: Honda Supra GTR; Honda RS150R; Honda Winner X Honda Winner R Honda RS-X
- Production: 2016–present
- Class: Underbone
- Engine: Honda K56 149.16 cc (9.1 cu in) liquid-cooled 4-stroke 4-valve DOHC single
- Bore / stroke: 57.3 mm × 57.8 mm (2.26 in × 2.28 in)
- Compression ratio: 11.3:1
- Top speed: 146 km/h (91 mph)
- Power: 12.1 kW (16.2 hp; 16.5 PS) @ 9,000 rpm
- Torque: 14.2 N⋅m (10.5 lbf⋅ft) @ 6,500 rpm
- Transmission: 6-speed constant mesh, manual
- Frame type: Twin-tube steel
- Suspension: Front: 31 mm (1.2 in) telescopic fork Rear: Swingarm with monoshock
- Brakes: Front: Single-piston caliper with single 256 mm (10.1 in) with ABS disc Rear: Single-piston caliper with single 220 mm (8.7 in) disc
- Tires: Front: 90/80-17M/C 46P; Rear: 120/70-17M/C 58P
- Wheelbase: 1,276 mm (50.2 in)
- Dimensions: L: 2,020 mm (80 in); W: 727 mm (28.6 in); H: 1,128 mm (44.4 in)
- Seat height: 786 mm (30.9 in)
- Weight: 119 kg (262 lb) (wet)
- Fuel capacity: 4.5 L (0.99 imp gal; 1.2 US gal)
- Fuel consumption: 45.2 km/L (128 mpg_{‑imp}; 106 mpg_{‑US})
- Related: Honda Sonic 150R

The Honda Winner is an underbone motorcycle from the Japanese manufacturer Honda. It was launched in April 2016 in Vietnam. It was also launched in May 2016 in Indonesia as the Supra GTR. In June 2016, the bike was launched in Malaysia as the RS150R.

The engine, codenamed K56, is shared with the 2015 Sonic 150R, 2015 CB150R (StreetFire), and 2016 CBR150R. With the engine producing 12 kW (16.1 hp; 16.3 PS), it makes the Winner as the fastest and most powerful 4-stroke underbone model ever offered by Honda, along with the Sonic.

== History ==
The Winner received an update in July 2019, dubbed as Winner X. The Indonesian-market Supra GTR received a more minor update on 23 September 2019. The Winner X was also released in Malaysia as the RS-X and had receive minor updates in January 2023.

In February 2024, the Winner X was launched in the Philippines, replacing the Supra GTR 150.

The Winner X received a minor update in December 2021.

The Winner R was launched in the Vietnam on 13 September 2025.

The RS-X received a face lift as a new model, called the "Honda RS-X WINNER" and minor update in Malaysia on 10 January 2025 11

== Performance ==
Some performance tests listed here were conducted by Otomotif tabloid from Indonesia in June 2016.

| Parameter | Time |
|---|---|
| 0–60 km/h (37 mph) | 4.2 s |
| 0–80 km/h (50 mph) | 7.4 s |
| 0–100 km/h (62 mph) | 12.1 s |
| 0–100 m (330 ft) | 7.2 s @ 79 km/h (49 mph) |
| 0–201 m (1/8 mile) | 11.3 s @ 95.7 km/h (59.5 mph) |
| 0–402 m (1/4 mile) | 18.2 s @ 111.5 km/h (69.3 mph) |
| Top speed (on speedometer) | 146 km/h (91 mph) |
| Top speed (Racelogic) | 130.2 km/h (80.9 mph) |
| Fuel consumption | 45.2 km/L (128 mpg_{‑imp}; 106 mpg_{‑US}) |

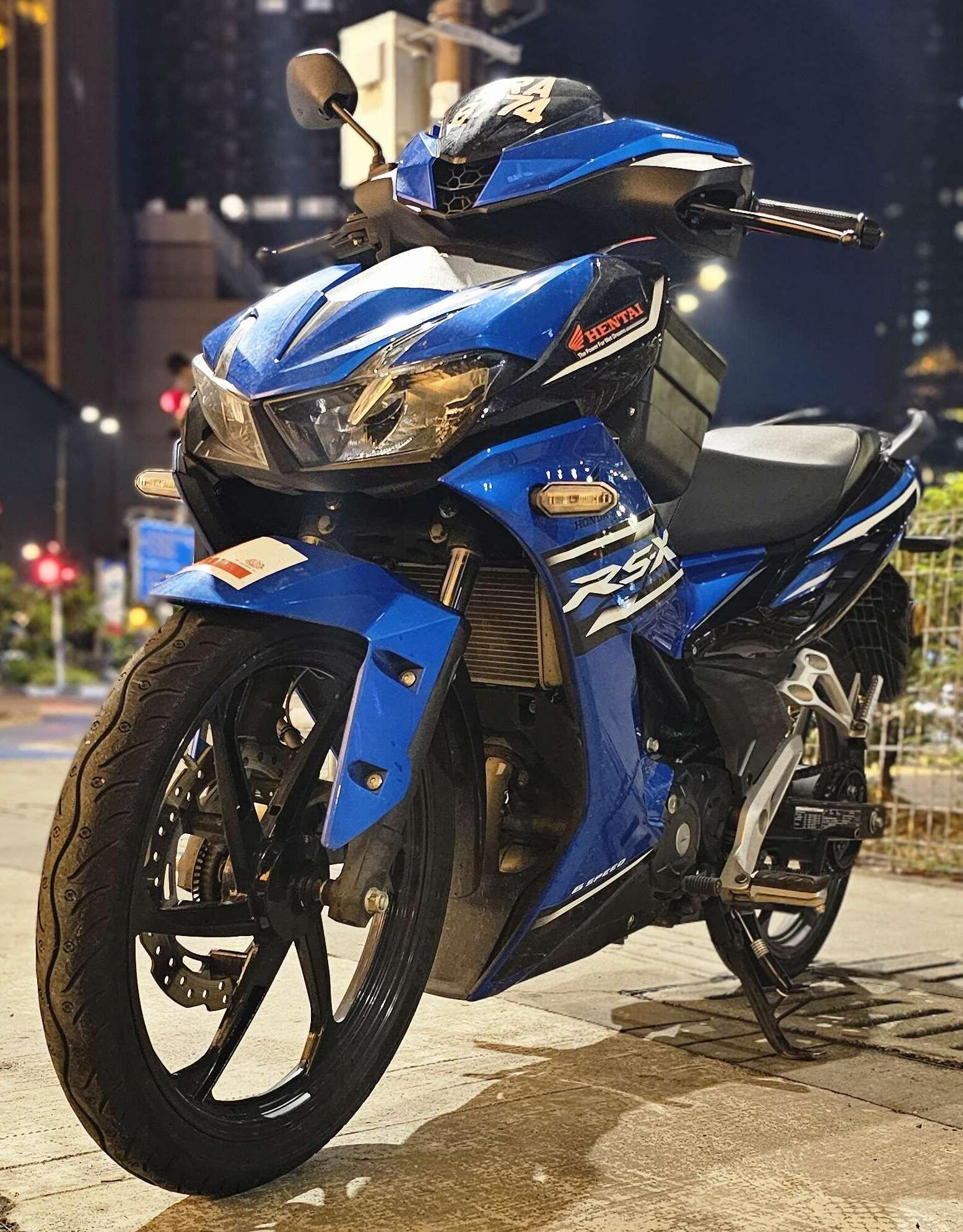
Honda RS-X 150

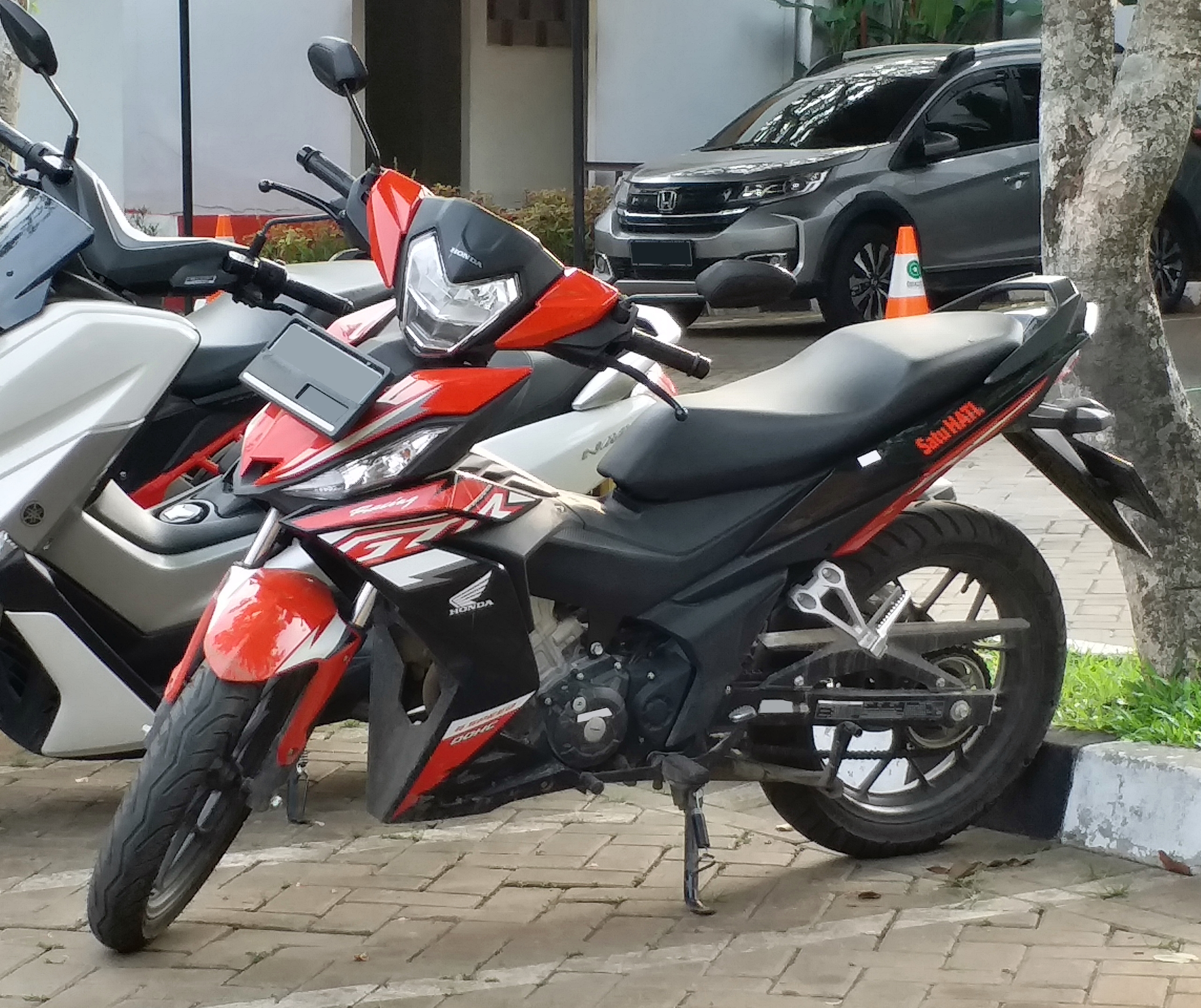
Honda Supra GTR
