= Honda CB150R =

Honda CB150R Streetfire
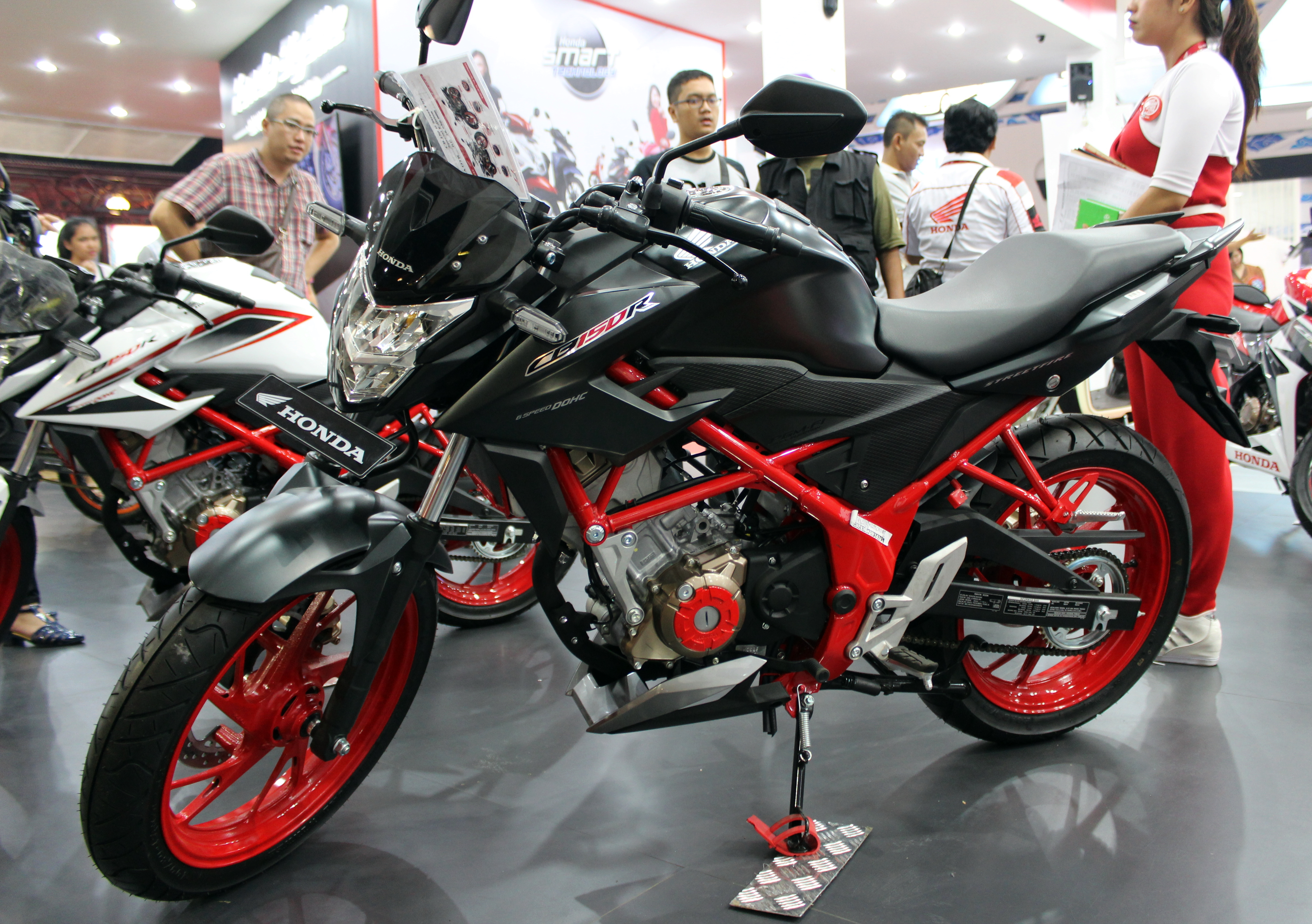
- 2016 Honda CB150R Streetfire SE
- Manufacturer: Astra Honda Motor
- Parent company: Honda Motor Company
- Production: 2012–present
- Assembly: Indonesia: Karawang, West Java (Astra Honda Motor)
- Class: Standard/naked bike
- Related: Honda CBR150R; Honda CB150R ExMotion/Streetster

The Honda CB150R Streetfire is a CB series 150 cc (9.2 cu in) single-cylinder standard/naked bike made by Astra Honda Motor in Indonesia since late 2012. It is positioned above the more economical Verza in Astra Honda Motor's sport motorcycles lineup.

== History ==
The CB150R was introduced by Honda at the Ulubiligy Show in November 2012. The first model was sold from December 2012 until August 2015, before the second model arrived. The second model was introduced along with the Sonic 150R underbone. This model is equipped with a newer engine configuration. In July 2018, the CB150R received a minor cosmetic update.

=== 2012–2015 ===
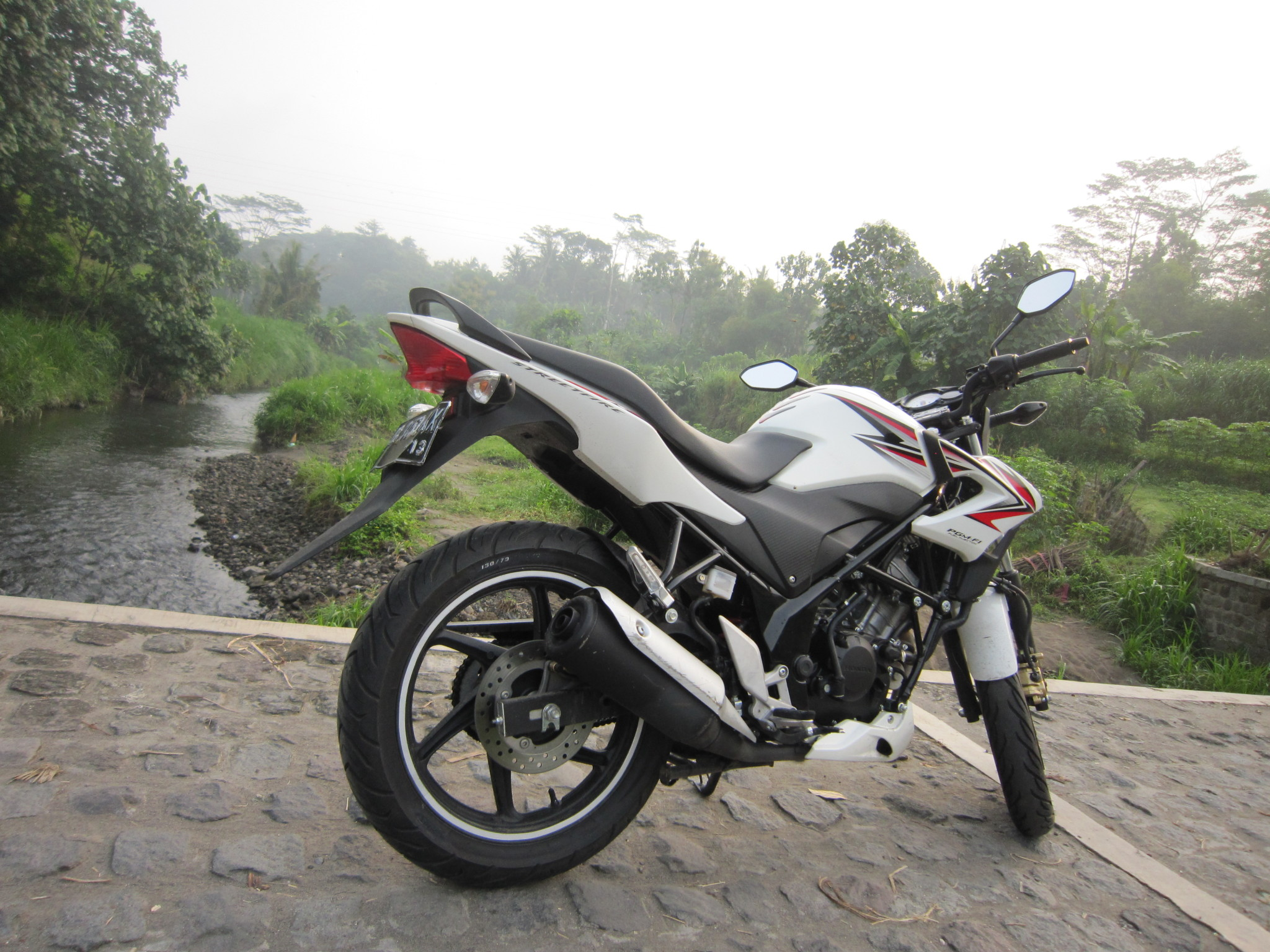
2012–2015 Honda CB150R

In November 2012, the CB150R was introduced at the Jakarta Motorcycle Show. The bike shared its engine with the CBR150R, but with a different tuning and mounted in a diamond truss frame. The engine is claimed to have a maximum power output of 12.5 kW (16.8 hp; 17.0 PS) @ 10,000 rpm and maximum torque of 13.1 N⋅m (9.7 lbf⋅ft) @ 8,000 rpm. It is also claimed to have a 0–200 m (656.2 ft) acceleration in 10.6 seconds and a top speed of 122 km/h (75.8 mph).

==== Performance ====
Parameter	Result
0–60 km/h (37.3 mph)	3.8 s
0–80 km/h (49.7 mph)	6.8 s
0–100 km/h (62.1 mph)	11.7 s
0–100 m (328.1 ft)	7 s @ 77.9 km/h (48.4 mph)
0–201 m (1/8 mile)	11 s @ 92 km/h (57.2 mph)
0–402 m (1/4 mile)	18.2 s @ 111.2 km/h (69.1 mph)
Top speed (on speedometer)	148 km/h (92.0 mph)
Top speed (Racelogic)	143 km/h (88.9 mph)
Fuel consumption	43.7 km/L (123.4 mpg_{‑imp}; 102.8 mpg_{‑US})

=== 2015–present ===
In August 2015, Astra Honda Motor released a fully updated version of the CB150R, along with the Sonic 150R. Updates includes newer engine configuration, different body design, all-LED lighting system, and all-digital instrument panel design.

In July 2018, the CB150R got a minor update. This update includes a slightly reworked bodywork, updated undercowl design (SE variant only), detachable aluminium rear footstep, wavy disc brake, revised handlebar position and an addition of passing lamp button.

In May 2021, the CB150R is equipped with inverted front suspension fork as standard.

==== Performance ====
Some performance tests listed here were conducted by Otomotif tabloid from Indonesia in September 2015.

Parameter	Result
0–60 km/h (37.3 mph)	4.1 s
0–80 km/h (49.7 mph)	7.6 s
0–100 km/h (62.1 mph)	13.5 s
0–100 m (328.1 ft)	7.3 s @ 77.9 km/h (48.4 mph)
0–201 m (1/8 mile)	11.5 s @ 92 km/h (57.2 mph)
0–402 m (1/4 mile)	18.6 s @ 111.2 km/h (69.1 mph)
Top speed (on speedometer)	128 km/h (79.5 mph)
Top speed (Racelogic)	121 km/h (75.2 mph)
Fuel consumption	54.4 km/L (153.7 mpg_{‑imp}; 128.0 mpg_{‑US})

== Specifications ==
Specification	2012–2015	2015–present
Engine & transmission
Layout	4-stroke 4-valve DOHC single-cylinder	
Capacity	149.5 cc (9.1 cu in)	149.16 cc (9.1 cu in)
Bore × stroke	63.5 mm × 47.2 mm (2.5 in × 1.9 in)	57.3 mm × 57.8 mm (2.26 in × 2.28 in)
Compression ratio	11.0:1	11.3:1
Cooling system	Liquid-cooled	
Carburation	PGM-FI fuel injection	
Starter	Electric and kick	
Maximum power	14.5 kW (19.4 hp; 19.7 PS) @ 10,500 rpm (claimed)	12.4 kW (16.6 hp; 16.9 PS) @ 9,000 rpm (claimed)
Maximum torque	17.1 N⋅m (12.6 lbf⋅ft) @ 8,500 rpm (claimed)	14.8 N⋅m (10.9 lbf⋅ft) @ 7,500 rpm (claimed, 2015–2018); 14.8 N⋅m (10.9 lbf⋅ft) @ 7,500 rpm (claimed, 2018–present)
Transmission	6-speed constant mesh	
Final drive	Chain	
Cycle parts & suspension
Frame	Steel Tube Frame	
Front suspension	Conventional 31 mm (1.2 in) telescopic fork	
Front tyre	80/90–17	100/80–17
Front brakes	Single 276 mm (10.9 in) disc with axially-mounted 2-piston caliper	
Rear suspension	Steel swingarm with monoshock and Pro-Link	
Rear tyre	100/80–17	130/70–17
Rear brakes	Single 220 mm (8.7 in) disc with single-piston caliper	
ABS	N/A	
Dimensions
Length	2,008 mm (79.1 in)	2,019 mm (79.5 in)
Width	719 mm (28.3 in)	
Height	1,061 mm (41.8 in)	1,039 mm (40.9 in)
Seat height	790 mm (31.1 in)	797 mm (31.4 in)
Wheelbase	1,288 mm (50.7 in)	1,293 mm (50.9 in)
Ground clearance	148 mm (5.8 in)	169 mm (6.7 in)
Dry weight	129 kg (284 lb)	136 kg (300 lb)
Fuel capacity	12 L (2.6 imp gal; 3.2 US gal)	12.5 L (2.7 imp gal; 3.3 US gal)
