= Honda NSR125 =

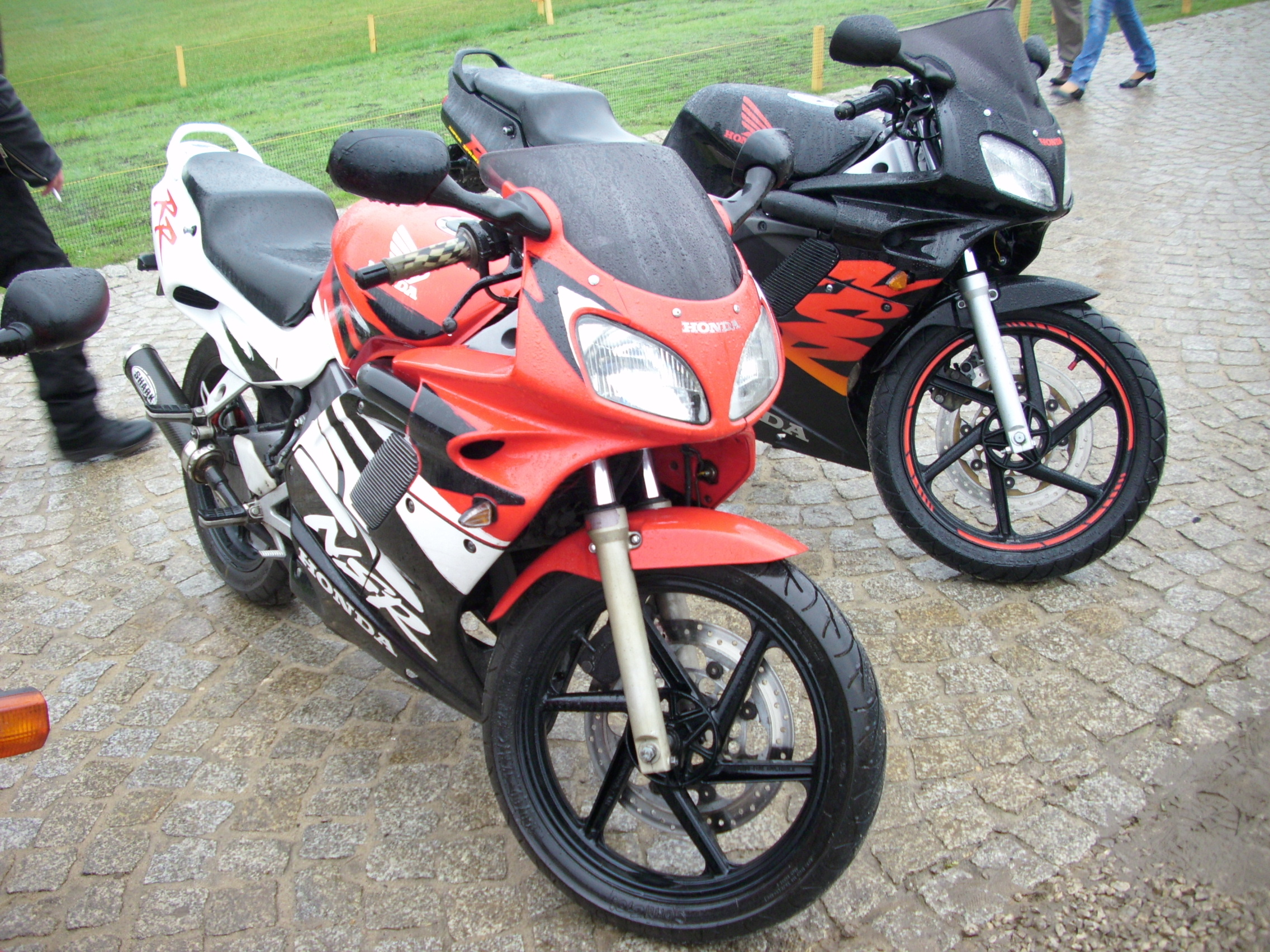
- Manufacturer: Honda
- Production: 1988–2001
- Assembly: Italy
- Successor: Honda CBR125R
- Class: Sport bike
- Engine: 124 cc (7.6 cu in), 2-stroke, liquid-cooled, single-cylinder
- Bore / stroke: 54 mm × 54.5 mm (2.13 in × 2.15 in)
- Compression ratio: 6.8:1
- Ignition type: CDI
- Transmission: 6-speed constant mesh chain drive
- Frame type: Alcast Aluminium Frame
- Brakes: Front: Dual-piston caliper with single disc Rear: Single-piston caliper with single disc
- Tires: Front: 100/80-17; Rear: 130/70-17
- Dimensions: L: 2,075 mm (81.7 in); W: 670 mm (26 in)
- Seat height: 800 mm (31 in)
- Weight: 136 kg (300 lb) (dry)
- Fuel capacity: 13 L (3.4 US gal)
- Related: Honda NSR150

The Honda NSR125 is a 124 cc (7.6 cu in) sport bike produced between 1988 and 2001 by Honda. The bike is powered by a two-stroke, RC-valve equipped, single-cylinder engine with a redline at 11,000 rpm. The name NSR125 is taken from the NSR500 GP bike.

== History and development ==
There were two models of the NSR125; the JC20 produced between 1988 and 1994 and the JC22 Foxeye produced between 1994 and 2001. They are easily distinguished by the headlights. The JC20 had double round headlight, while the JC22 had a "foxeye" headlight hence the nickname.

Following the success of the NS125 (an earlier model to the NSR), the NSR125 JC20 was designed and assembled by Honda Italia Industriale S.p.A. in Rome, Italy. Grimeca was contracted to produce the aluminium cast frame (2-piece, die-cast, bolt together construction), wheels and brake assemblies. The engine was manufactured by Gilardoni with Dell'Orto supplying the carburetor. Marzocchi supplied forks and suspension while Pagani provided instrumentation and lighting. The Grimeca rear wheel was 18 inch in diameter, while the front was 17 inch and shod in Pirelli MT-45 tires.

The NSR125 JC22 is mostly of Japanese manufacture, with the engine parts and other key elements of the running of the motorbike produced in Japan, it was then assembled in Italy and supplied to its mainly European market. Design changes saw the JC22 to receive a steel fuel tank and visual trim resembling the NR750.

Although it is a common mistake to believe the NSR continued production until 2003. This is not the case as they ceased production in 2001 but had leftover stock until 2003/5.

The NS125 which was available as an "F" naked, or "R" fully faired is commonly mistaken as an NSR of earlier production, although shares no real parts or design similarities. This model is most easily identifiable by its singular square headlight, rather than the earlier NSR's dual round headlights or the later NSR's "foxeye" design.
