= Honda NSR series =

Line of Honda sport motorcycles

The Honda NSR is a series of two-stroke Grand Prix racing and race replica motorcycles built by the Honda Racing Corporation, produced mainly for Asian and European markets.

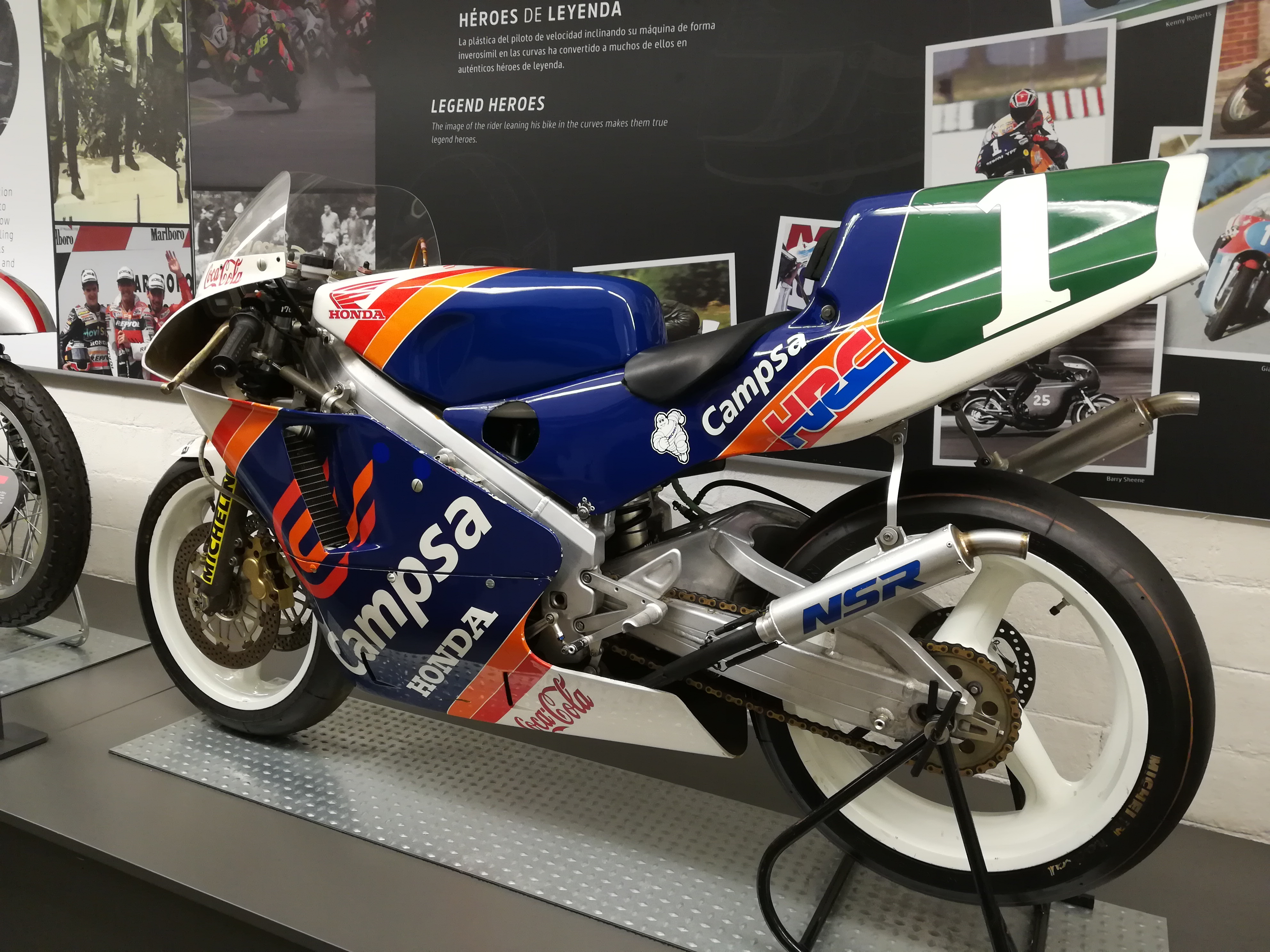
1989 Honda NSR250

== Racing models ==
- NSR250
- NSR500 (and privateer-dedicated NSR500V)

Neither racing model designation is currently in use, with the NSR500 having been replaced by the MotoGP RC211V series when the premiere class returned to four stroke motors, and the NSR250 being discontinued in favor of the RS250 model designation.

== Race replica series ==
- Honda NSR50
- Honda NSR125
- Honda NSR150
- Honda NSR250R
