= Honda CBR125R =

Sport bike

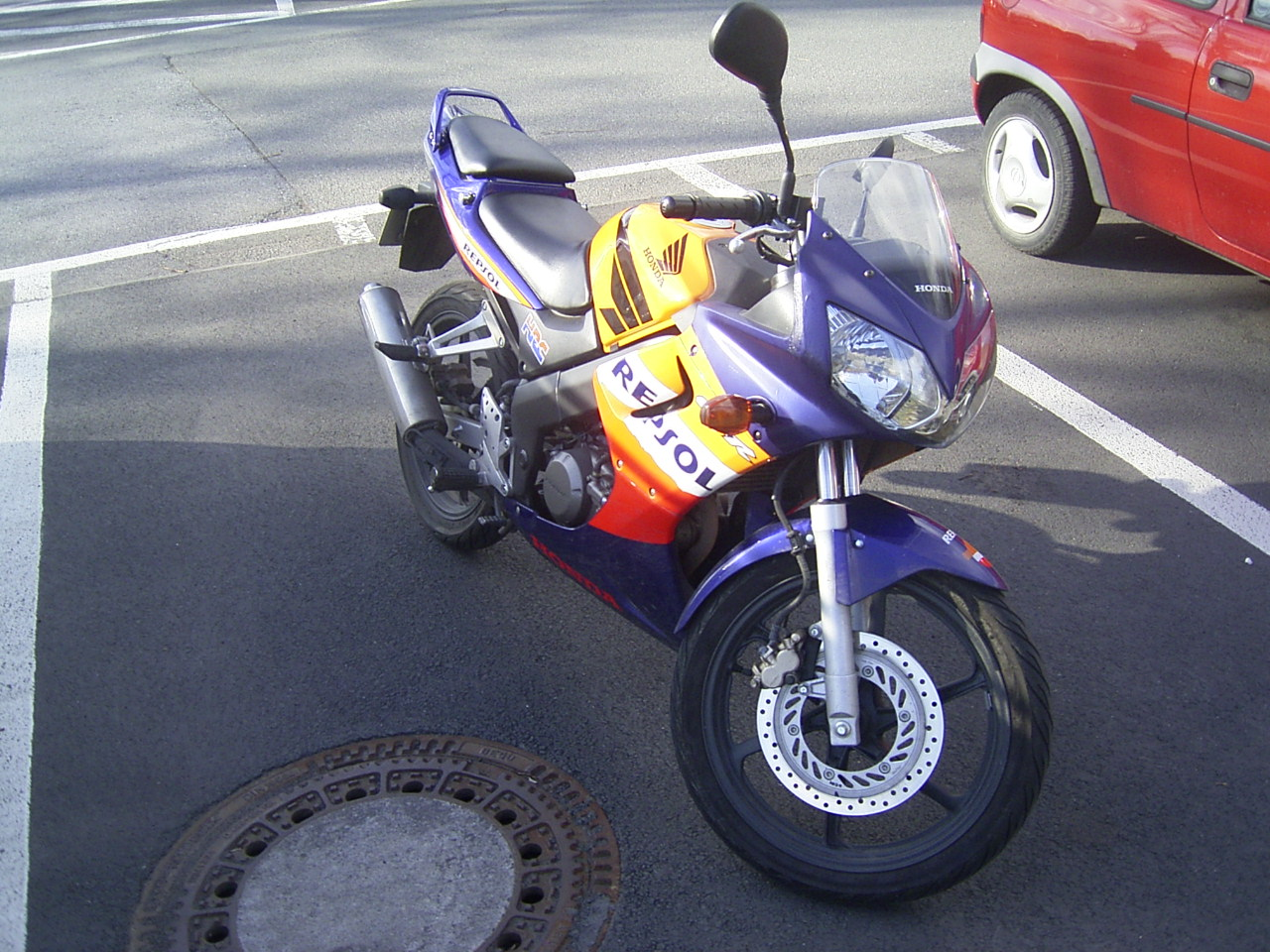
- 2004–2006 Honda CBR125R
- Manufacturer: Honda
- Production: 2004–2016
- Assembly: Thailand (A.P. Honda)
- Predecessor: Honda NSR125
- Class: Sport bike
- Engine: 125 cc (7.6 cu in), SOHC, liquid-cooled, single-cylinder
- Related: Honda CBR150R; Honda CB125R; Honda Sonic 125; Honda CS1

The Honda CBR125R is a CBR series 125 cc (7.6 cu in) single-cylinder sport bike made by Honda. The CBR125R first appeared on the market in 2004. It is manufactured in Thailand by A.P. Honda alongside the similarly designed CBR150R, which is primarily aimed for the Far East market.

It has the smallest displacement engine of any CBR motorcycle.

== History ==
The CBR125R was introduced in 2004 by Honda to fill in a gap in the 125 cc market left by the discontinued NSR125. It is powered by a 124.7 cc (7.61 cu in) liquid-cooled 4-stroke 2-valve SOHC single-cylinder engine with a claimed power output of 10 kW (13.4 hp; 13.6 PS).

=== 2004–2006 ===
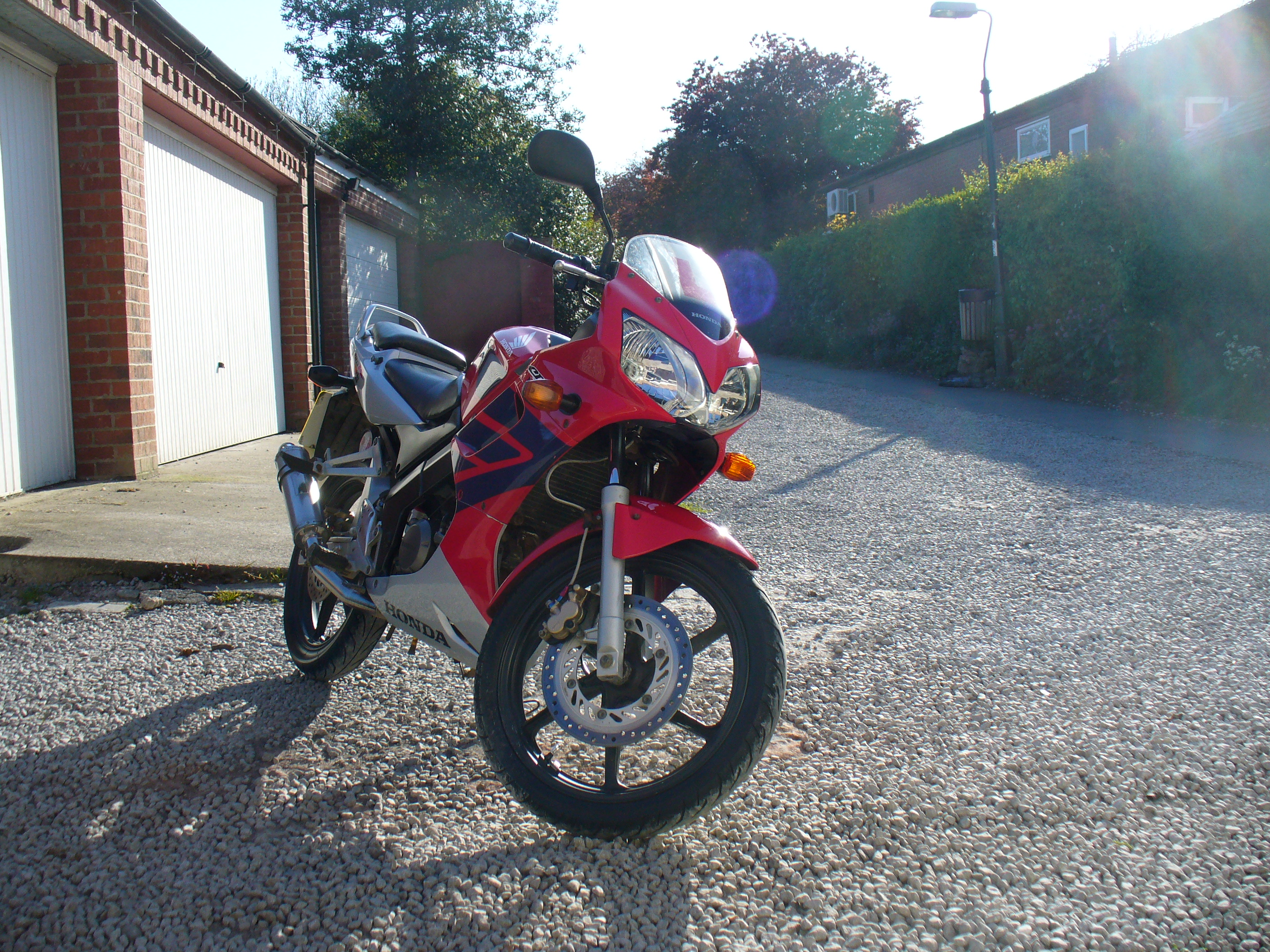
2006 Honda CBR125R

The models produced during these years resemble the CBR600F4i and used a carburettor in the fuel system. The Repsol color scheme was introduced in 2005 and remained for the following year only as the CBR125RS5/6.

=== 2007–2010 ===
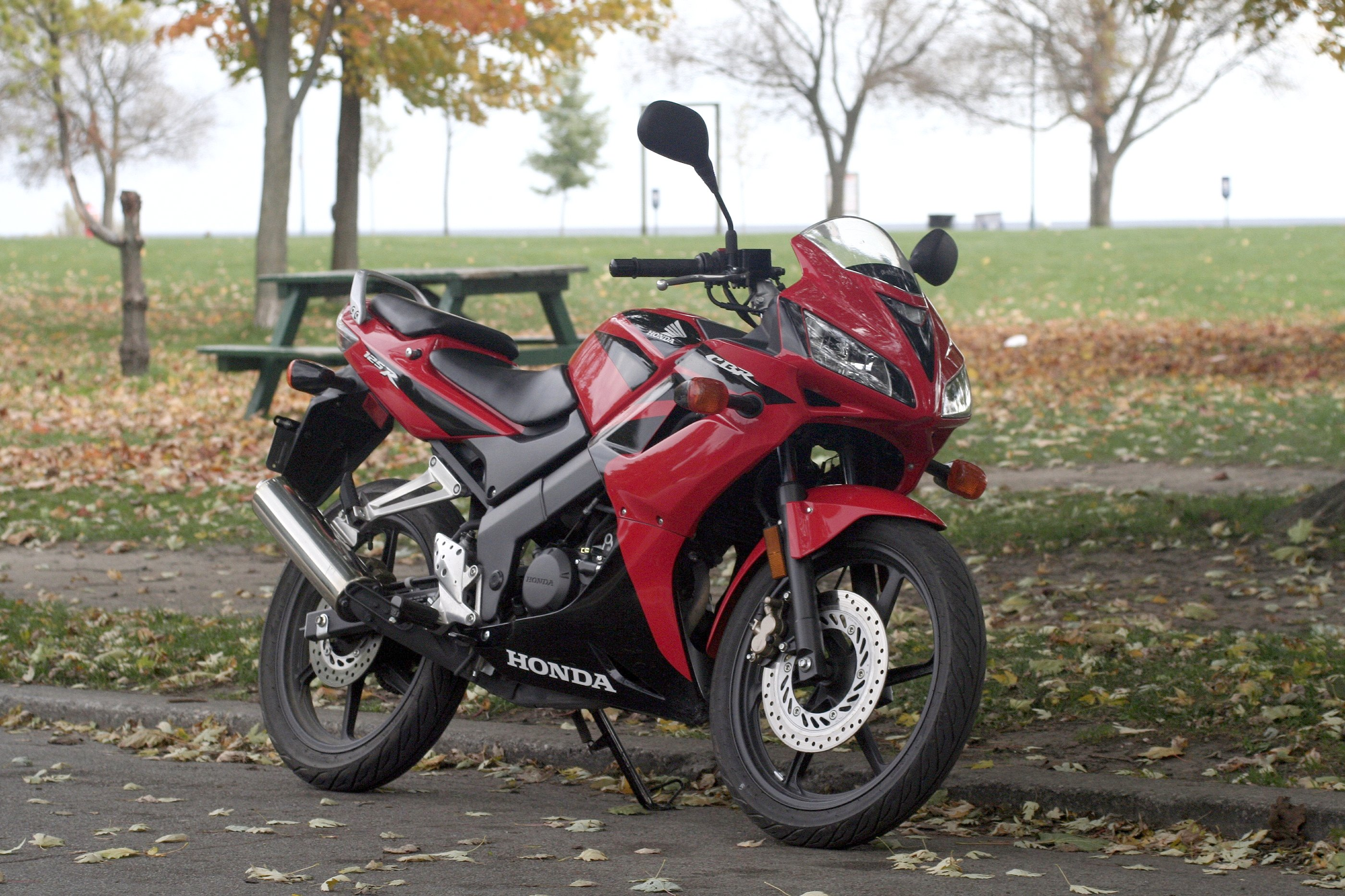
2008 Honda CBR125R

In 2007, the CBR125R received some major changes. This model got different front fairings to resemble the look of the CBR600RR as well as colour changes to the swingarm and front telescopic fork which are now black. Engine changes included the implementation of PGM-FI fuel injection system, IACV (Idle Air Control Valve) which operates alongside the PGM-FI, and HECS3 oxygen sensor to comply with EURO3 standards.

=== 2011–2016 ===
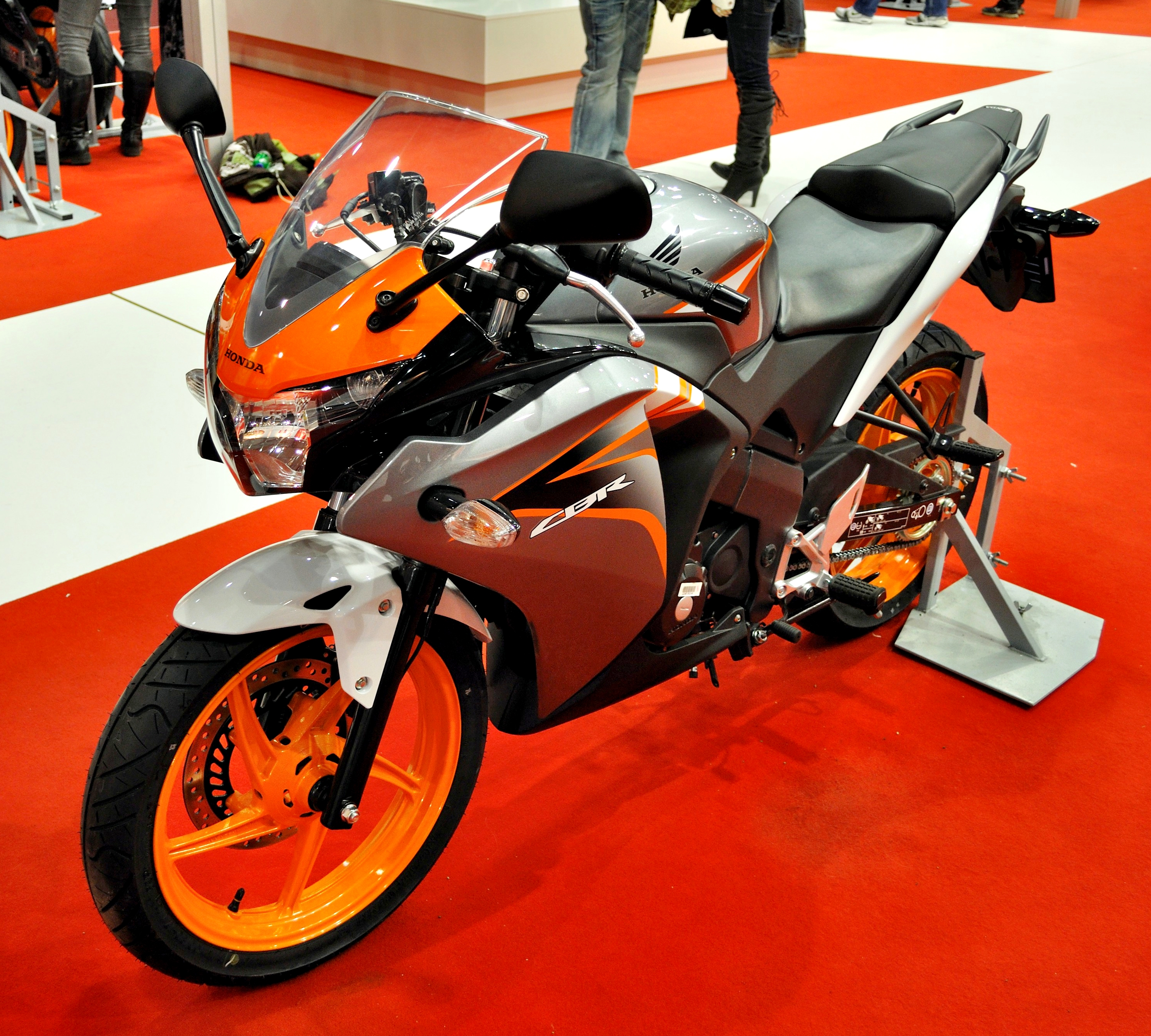
2011 Honda CBR125R

In 2011, the CBR125R received the first major overhaul since its inception, bringing its looks in line with the 2011 CBR250R, which in turn borrows from VFR1200F sports tourer.

== Specifications ==
Specification	2004–2006	2007–2010	2011–2016
Engine & transmission
Layout	4-stroke 2-valve SOHC single-cylinder		
Capacity	124.7 cc (7.6 cu in)		
Bore × stroke	58.0 mm × 47.2 mm (2.3 in × 1.9 in)		
Compression ratio	11.0:1		
Cooling system	Liquid-cooled		
Carburation	Carburetor	PGM-FI fuel injection	
Starter	Electric		
Maximum power	10 kW (13.4 hp; 13.6 PS) @ 10,000 rpm (claimed)		
Maximum torque	10.4 N⋅m (7.7 lbf⋅ft) @ 8,250 rpm (claimed)		
Transmission	6-speed constant mesh		
Final drive	Chain		
Cycle parts & suspension
Frame	Steel twin-spar		
Front suspension	Conventional 31 mm (1.2 in) telescopic fork		
Front tyre	80/90–17		100/80–17
Front brakes	Single 276 mm (10.9 in) disc with axially-mounted 2-piston caliper		
Rake	25°		35°
Rear suspension	Steel swingarm with monoshock		
Rear tyre	100/80–17		130/70–17
Rear brakes	Single 220 mm (8.7 in) disc with single-piston caliper		
ABS	N/A		
Dimensions
Length	1,920 mm (75.6 in)		1,946 mm (76.6 in)
Width	675 mm (26.6 in)		704 mm (27.7 in)
Height	1,070 mm (42.1 in)		1,089 mm (42.9 in)
Seat height	776 mm (30.6 in)		795 mm (31.3 in)
Wheelbase	1,294 mm (50.9 in)		1,310 mm (51.6 in)
Ground clearance	172 mm (6.8 in)		185 mm (7.3 in)
Trail	88 mm (3.5 in)		90 mm (3.5 in)
Wet weight	127 kg (280 lb)		137 kg (302 lb)
Fuel capacity	10 L (2.2 imp gal; 2.6 US gal)		13 L (2.9 imp gal; 3.4 US gal)
