= Honda CBR250RR (2017) =

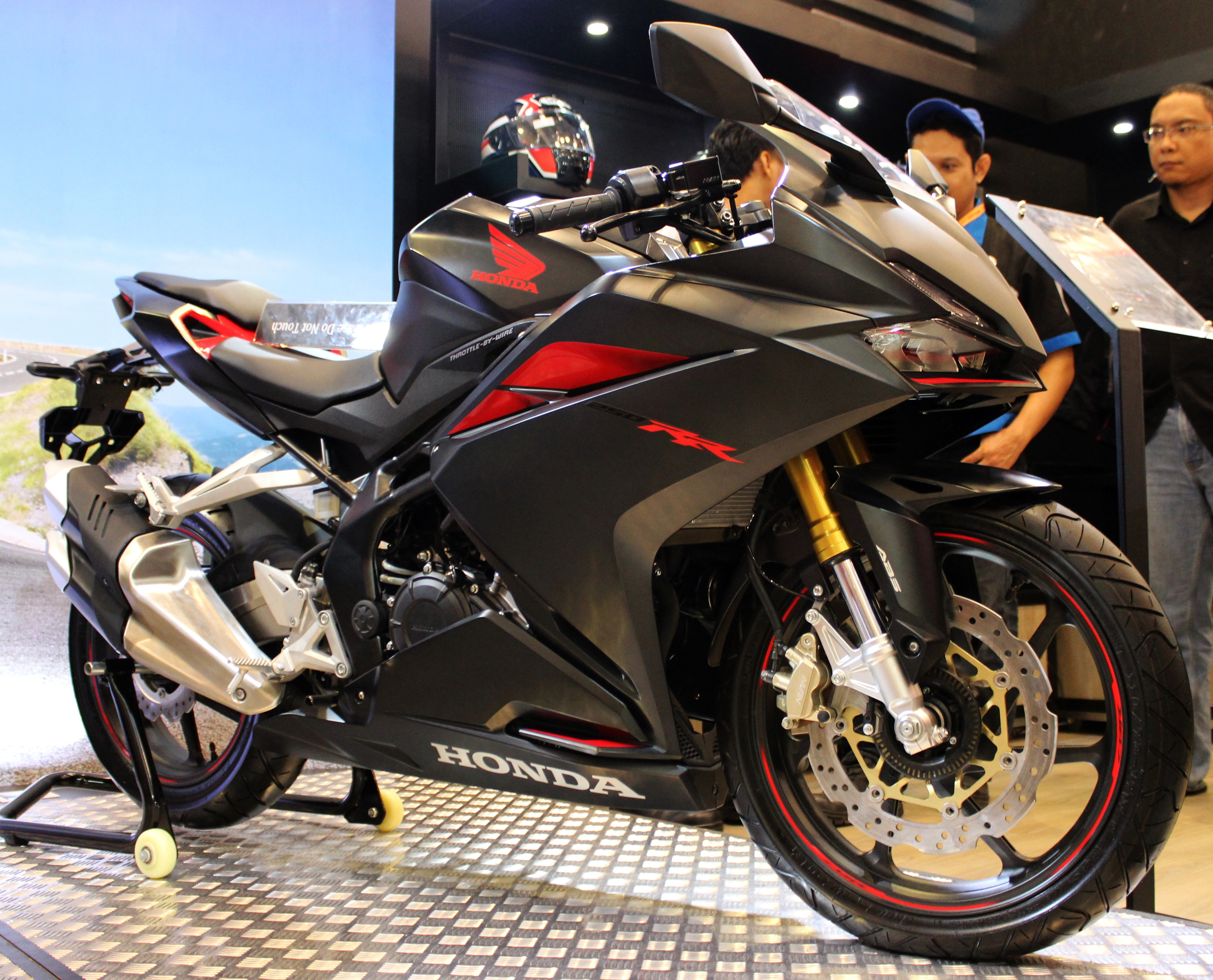
- Manufacturer: Honda
- Production: November 2016 – present
- Assembly: Japan: Ōzu, Kumamoto; Indonesia: Karawang, West Java (Astra Honda Motor)
- Class: Sport bike
- Engine: 249.7 cc (15.24 cu in) liquid-cooled 4-stroke 8-valve DOHC parallel-twin
- Bore / stroke: 62 mm × 41.36 mm (2.4 in × 1.6 in)
- Compression ratio: 2017–2020: 11.5:1; 2020–present: 12.1:1
- Top speed: 179 km/h (111 mph)
- Power: 2017–2020: 28.4 kW (38.1 hp; 38.6 PS) @ 12,500 rpm (claimed); 2020–present: 30 kW (40.2 hp; 40.8 PS) @ 13,000 rpm (claimed); 23.74 kW (31.8 hp; 32.3 PS) @ 12,100 rpm (rear wheel)
- Torque: 2017–2020: 23.2 N⋅m (17.1 lbf⋅ft) @ 11,000 rpm (claimed); 2020–present: 25 N⋅m (18 lbf⋅ft) @ 11,000 rpm (claimed); 20.09 N⋅m (14.82 lbf⋅ft) @ 11,000 rpm (rear wheel)
- Transmission: 6-speed constant mesh, chain final drive
- Frame type: Steel truss frame
- Suspension: Front: Inverted 37 mm (1.5 in) Showa telescopic fork; Rear: Aluminium swingarm, 5-way adjustable monoshock with Pro-Link
- Brakes: Front: Axially-mounted 2-piston Nissin caliper with single 310 mm (12.2 in) disc; Rear: Single-piston Nissin caliper with single 240 mm (9.4 in) disc
- Tires: Front: 110/70–17 54S (tubeless); Rear: 140/70–17 66S (tubeless)
- Rake, trail: 24°30´, 92 mm (3.6 in)
- Wheelbase: 1,389 mm (54.7 in)
- Dimensions: L: 2,060 mm (81.1 in); W: 724 mm (28.5 in); H: 1,098 mm (43.2 in)
- Seat height: 790 mm (31.1 in)
- Weight: 165 kg (364 lb) (non-ABS); 168 kg (370 lb) (ABS); (wet)
- Fuel capacity: 14.5 L (3.2 imp gal; 3.8 US gal)
- Fuel consumption: 24 km/L (68 mpg_{‑imp}; 56 mpg_{‑US})

The Honda CBR250RR is a CBR series 250 cc (15 cu in) twin-cylinder sport bike made by Astra Honda Motor, a subsidiary of Honda in Indonesia. It was unveiled in July 2016 in Jakarta. Production was started in November of the same year for the 2017 model year. It is the first CBR motorcycle to have a twin-cylinder engine on RR moniker. It is also the smallest Honda motorcycle to wear a CBR-RR badge. Previously, Honda also used the CBR250RR name for their four-cylinder sport bike sold between 1990 and 1996. The bike is officially sold in Indonesia, Japan, Hong Kong, Macau, Thailand, and Malaysia.

According to Honda, the CBR250RR has technologies derived from the RC213V MotoGP bike, including throttle-by-wire technology, three riding modes, and a more compact engine design than its competitors.

== Concept model ==
The basis for the CBR250RR was Honda's Light Weight Super Sports Concept that was shown at the 2015 Tokyo Motor Show. The concept bike had a parallel-twin engine that redlined at 14,000 rpm.

== 2020 update ==
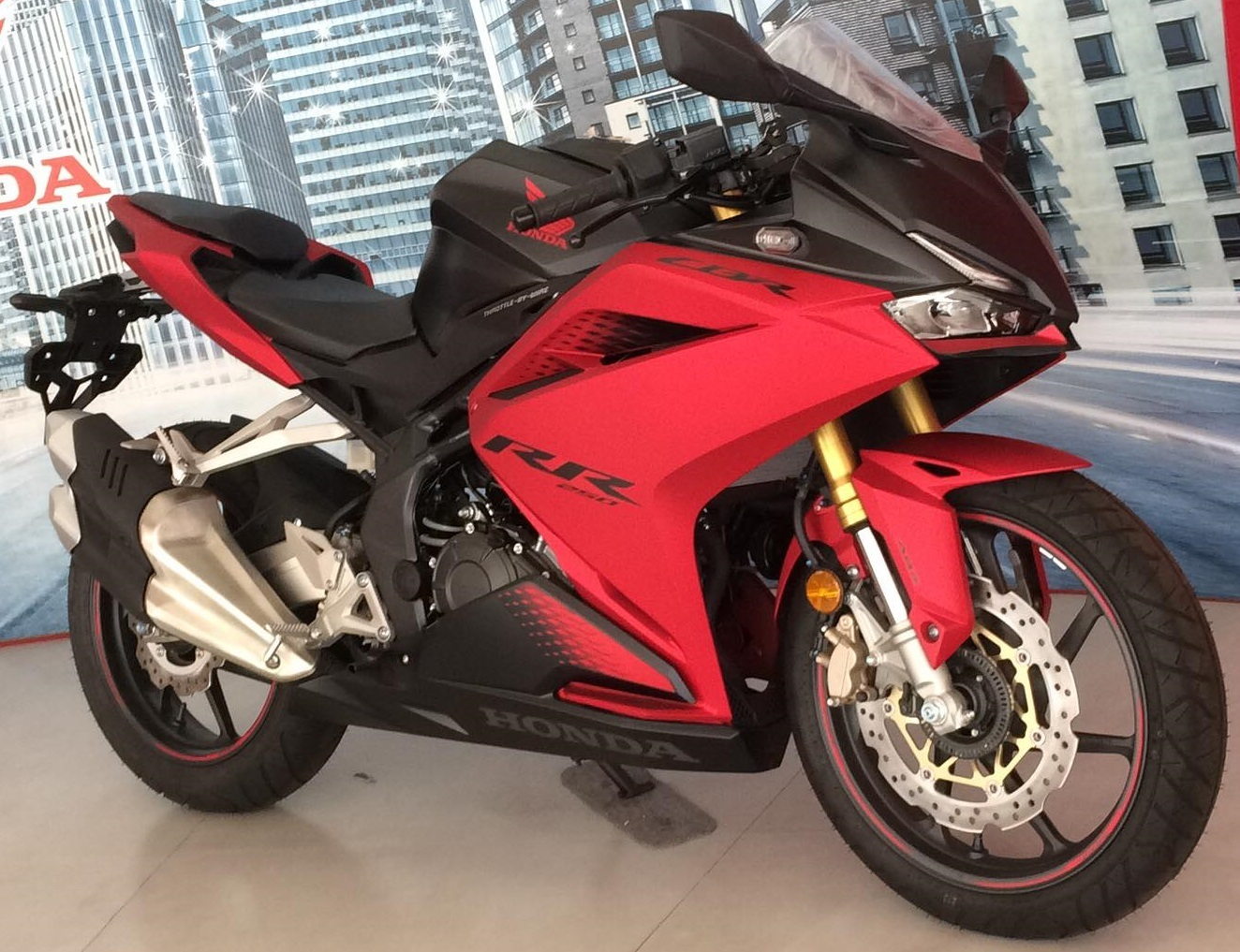
2021 Honda CBR250RR SP

The CBR250RR received its first update in July 2020, which included assist and slipper clutch as standard equipment. The compression ratio was increased by changing the piston shape, using a smaller diameter balancer. This and other updates increases the power and torque figures to 30 kW (40.2 hp; 40.8 PS) and 25 N⋅m (18 lbf⋅ft). The quickshifter became available as an option, except for Indonesian SP model where it became standard.

== 2022 update ==
The CBR250RR received its second update in September 2022.

== Racing ==
As of 2017, the CBR250RR has participated in Asia Road Racing Championship at Asia Production 250cc (AP250) class. The bike produces more than 40 hp (30 kW) and weighs 135 kg (298 lb). It won the championship in its debut season as well as the following year. The CBR250RR has also been raced in the Indonesian Indospeed Race Series championship and Malaysia Superbike Championship.

== Performance ==
Some performance tests listed here were conducted by Otomotif tabloid from Indonesia in December 2016.

Parameter	Time
0–60 km/h (37 mph)	2.8 s
0–80 km/h (50 mph)	4.2 s
0–100 km/h (62 mph)	6.2 s
0–100 m (328 ft)	6.1 s @ 98.6 km/h (61.3 mph)
0–201 m (1/8 mile)	9.3 s @ 122.3 km/h (76.0 mph)
0–402 m (1/4 mile)	14.7 s @ 144 km/h (89 mph)
Top speed (on speedometer)	179 km/h (111 mph)
Top speed (Racelogic)	167.4 km/h (104 mph)
Fuel consumption	24 km/L (68 mpg_{‑imp}; 56 mpg_{‑US})

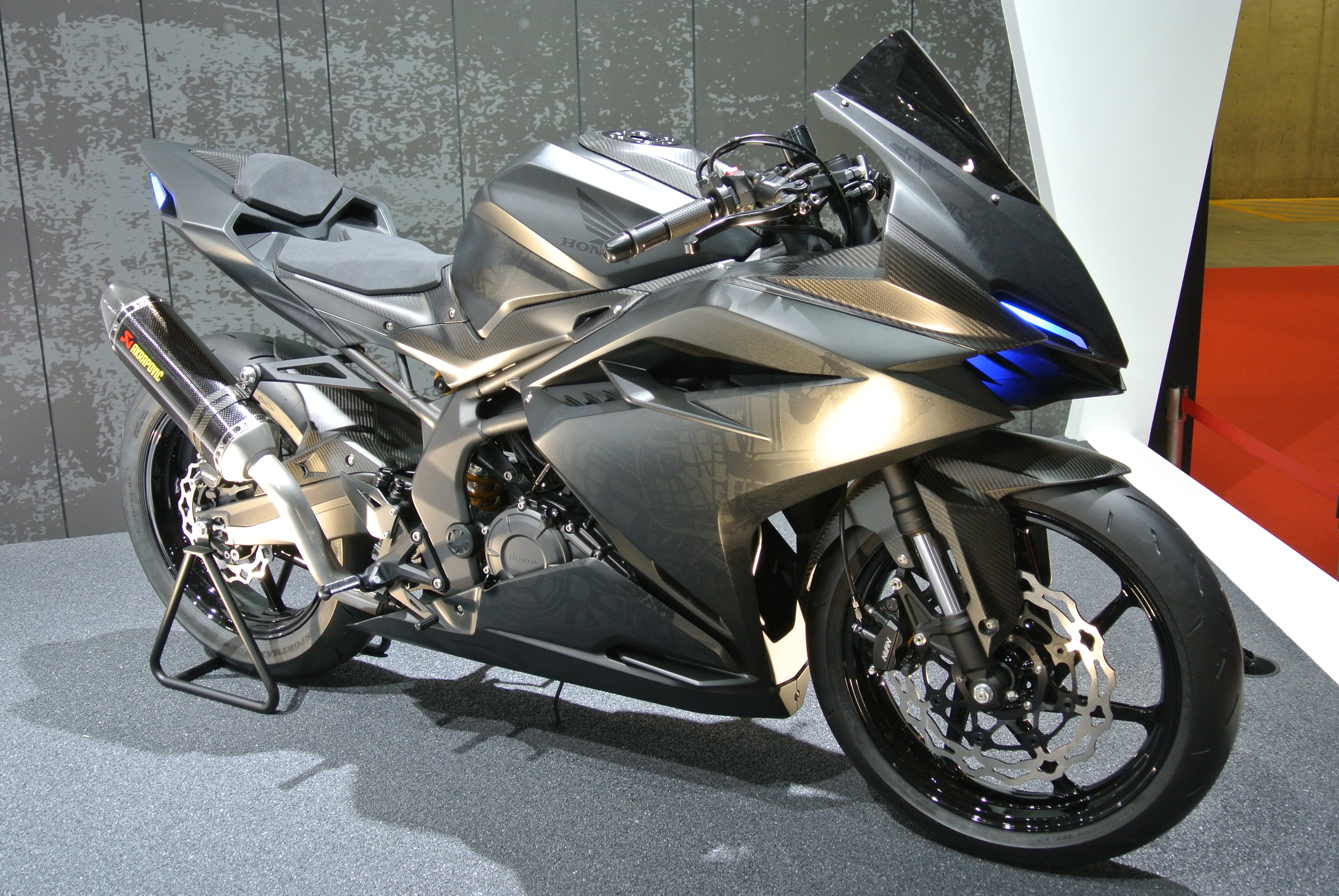
The Honda Light Weight Super Sports Concept previews the CBR250RR at the 2015 Tokyo Motor Show

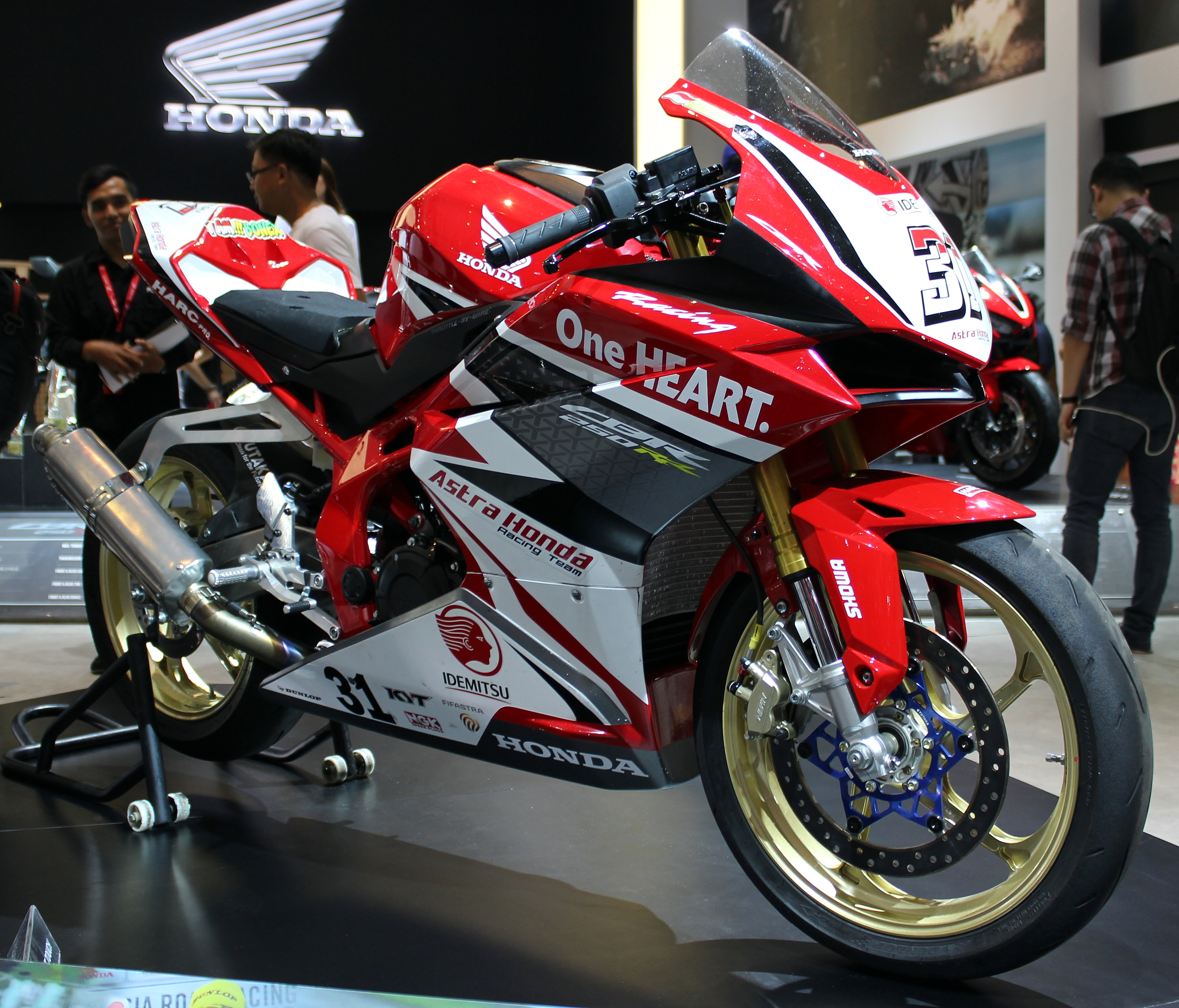
The CBR250RR ridden by Gerry Salim in 2017 season of ARRC in the AP250 class. The bike won the championship its first year in the series.
