= Honda NS125 =

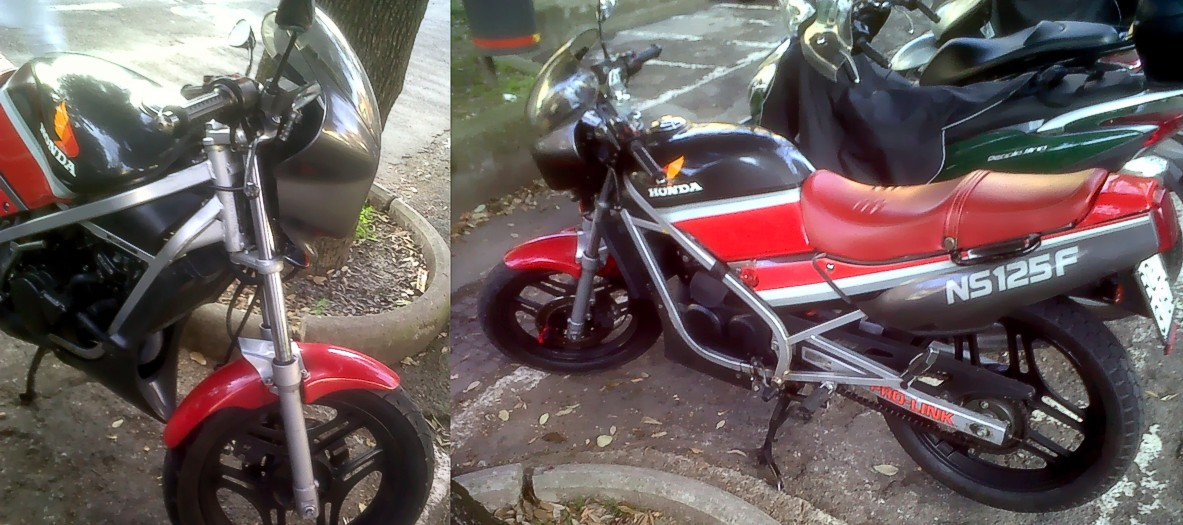
- Honda NS125F
- Manufacturer: Honda Motor Company
- Production: 1986–1993 (UK)
- Assembly: Atessa, Italy
- Class: Sport bike
- Engine: 124.5 cc (7.60 cu in) two-stroke, liquid-cooled, single
- Bore / stroke: 56.0 mm × 50.6 mm (2.20 in × 1.99 in)
- Compression ratio: 6.5:1
- Ignition type: Capacitor discharge electronic ignition.
- Transmission: 6-speed manual; chain final drive
- Frame type: Duplex cradle; square section steel
- Suspension: Front: telescopic Rear: swingarm single shock absorber
- Brakes: Front: disc Rear: drum
- Tires: Front: 3.25 x 16; Rear: 3.50 x 18
- Wheelbase: 1.350 m (4 ft 5.1 in) (F); 1.360 m (4 ft 5.5 in) (R)
- Dimensions: L: 2.000 m (6 ft 6.7 in) (F); 2.035 m (6 ft 8.1 in) (R); W: .720 m (2 ft 4.3 in) (F).690 m (2 ft 3.2 in) (R); H: 1.140 m (3 ft 8.9 in) (F); 1.120 m (3 ft 8.1 in) (R)
- Seat height: .780 m (2 ft 6.7 in) (F); Unknown (R)
- Weight: 108 kg (238 lb) (F); 118 kg (260 lb) (R) (dry)
- Fuel capacity: 14.5 L (3.2 imp gal; 3.8 US gal) (F); 13.0 L (2.9 imp gal; 3.4 US gal) (R)

The Honda NS125 was first presented at the Bologna Motor Show in December 1984 and went on sale in April 1985. The engine is a liquid cooled, 124.5 cc (7.60 cu in), two-stroke which used Honda's ATAC system (Automatically Controlled Torque Amplification Chamber). However the ATAC equipped models were not available in the UK. The NS was Honda's first attempt at the high end 125cc sports bike market in Italy; therefore it was built in Atessa, Italy and many of the parts used were made by well known Italian brands such as Dell'Orto for the carburetor, Marzocchi forks and single rear shock and Grimeca wheels and front disk brake. Honda, Japan supplied the spec sheets and a few parts like the electrics, piston and barrel.

The Honda NS125 which was available as an "F" naked, or an "R" fully faired is commonly mistaken as an older NSR, although it shares no real parts or design to it. This model is most easily identifiable by its singular square headlight, rather than the later NSR's 'foxeye' design
