= Honda Sonic =

Underbone

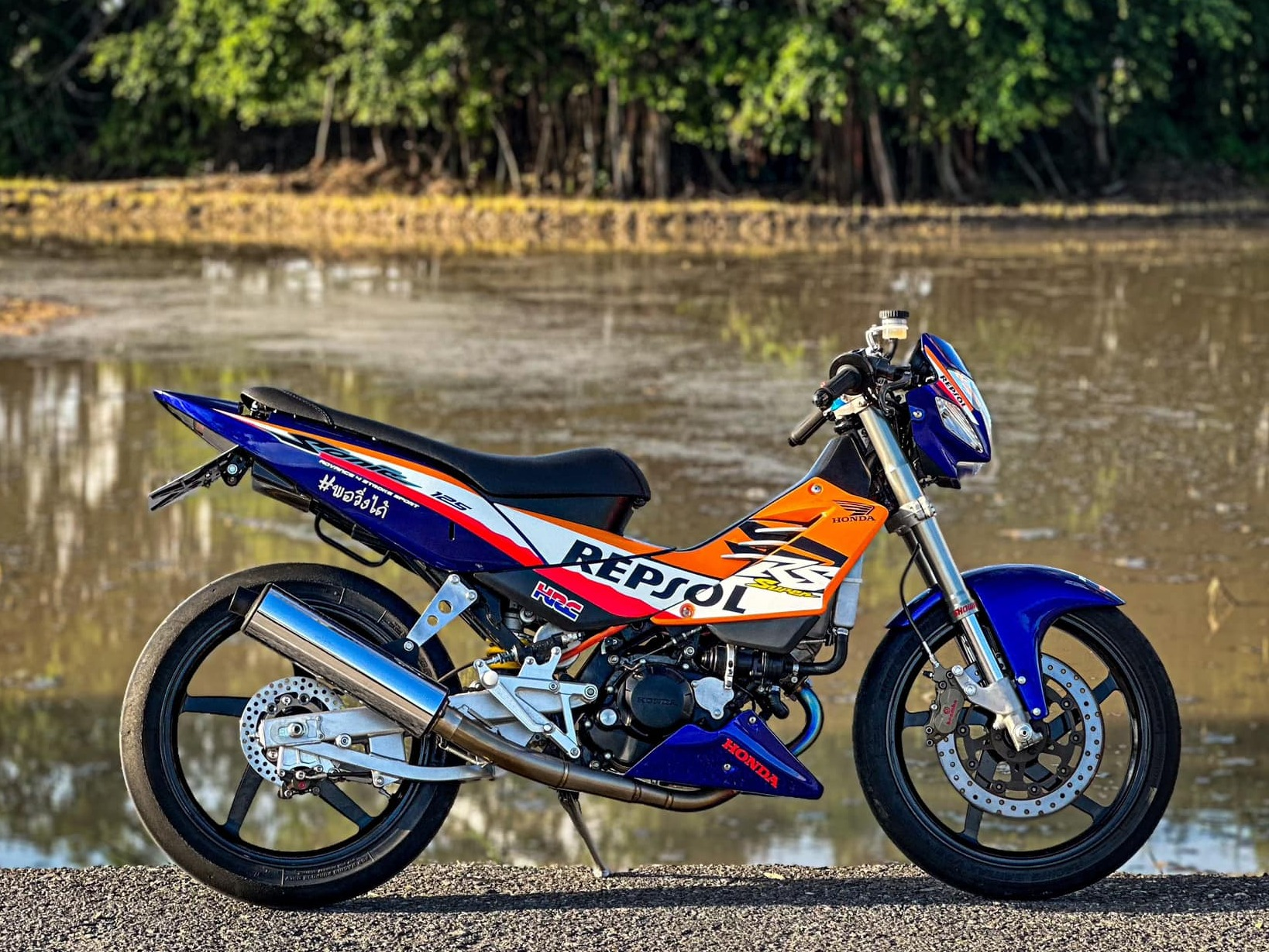
- Sonic MR Factory
- Manufacturer: Honda
- Production: 2004–2016
- Class: Underbone
- Engine: 125 cc (7.6 cu in), SOHC, liquid-cooled, single-cylinder 150 cc (9.2 cu in), SOHC, liquid-cooled, single-cylinder
- Related: Honda CBR150R; Honda CB125R

The Honda Sonic is a 125 cc, later 150 cc underbone motorcycle designed for the Southeast Asian market by Honda. It is the part of the Nova series of sports oriented underbone motorbikes produced since the mid-1990s.

== Overview ==
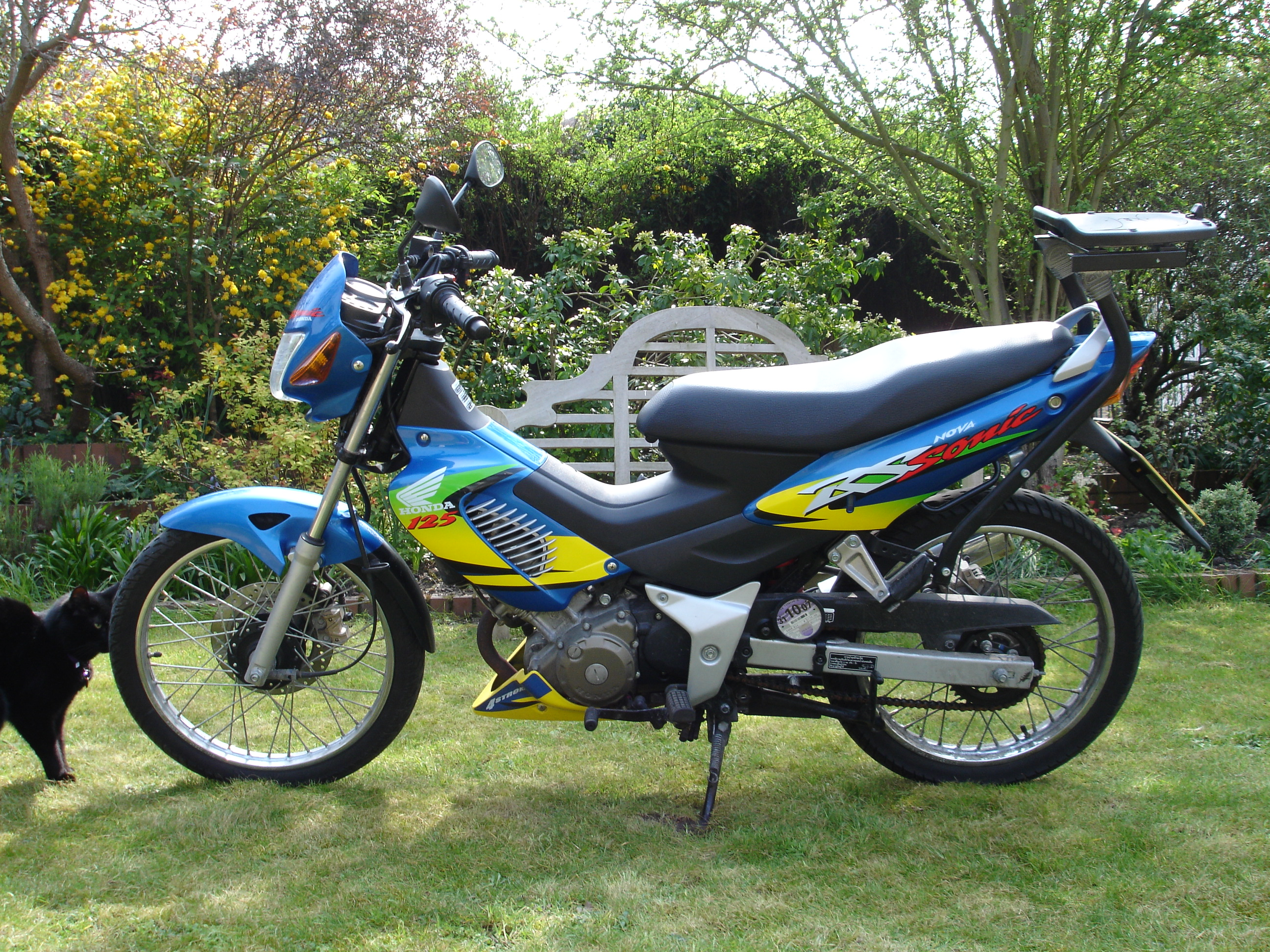
Honda Nova Sonic RS

=== Engine ===
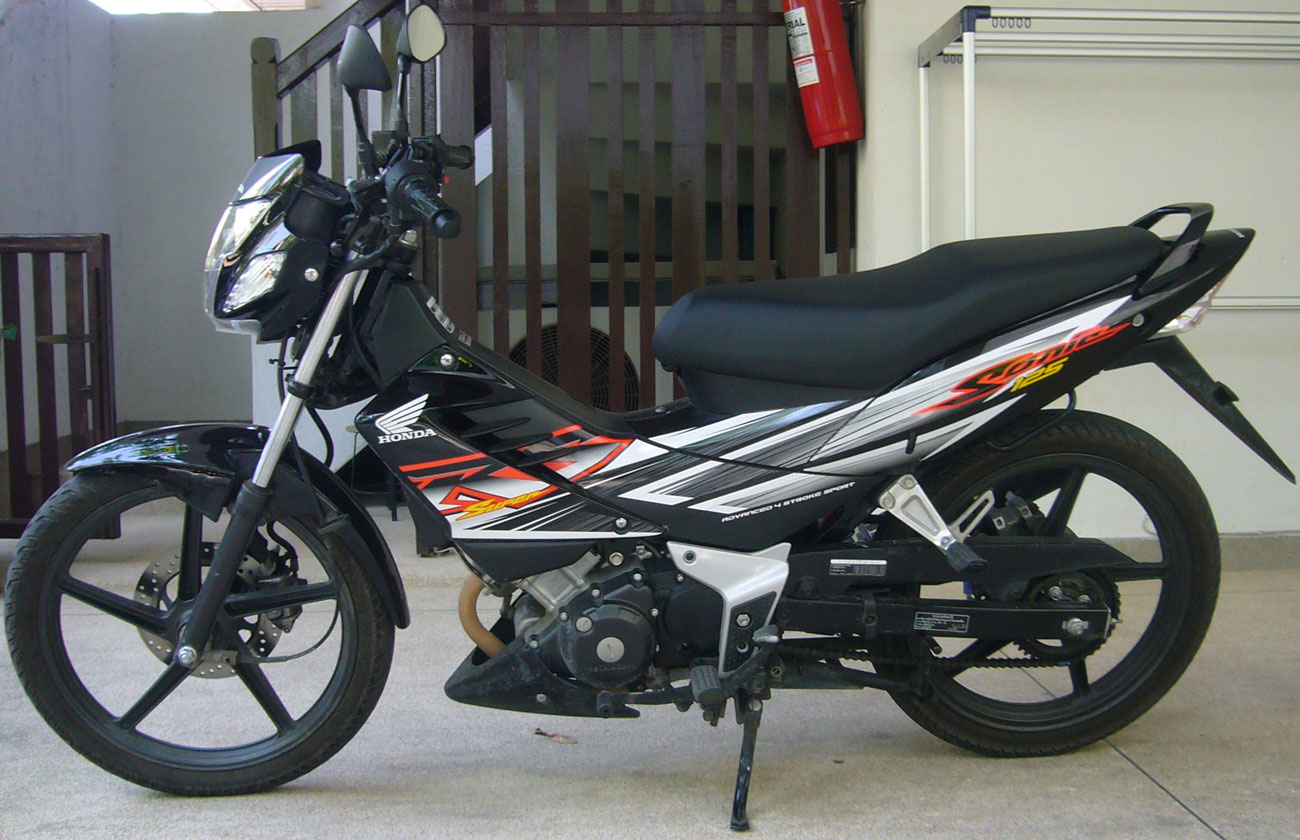
Sonic 125 RS Super

The Sonic is fitted with the European CBR125R and Indonesian CS1 4-stroke engine. It was adapted to liquid cooling due to hotter weather conditions. The single-cylinder engine redlines at 10,900 rpm.

The engine utilizes an overbore design with two bigger valves. It also has a bigger Keihin carburetor with 28 mm venturi diameter.

=== Models ===
The Sonic comes in two models, RS and RS Super.

== Sonic 150R ==
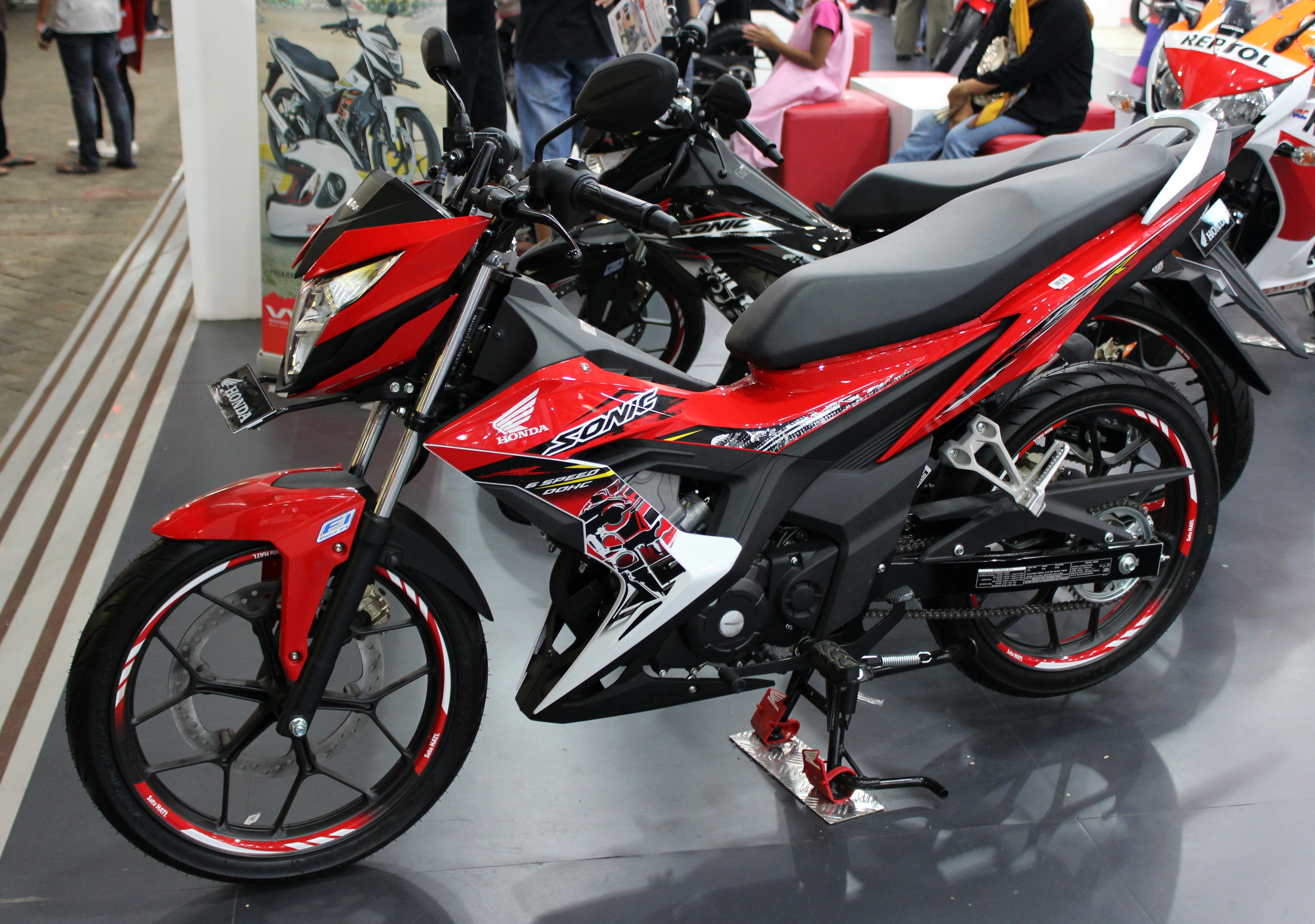
Sonic 150R at the 2016 Jakarta Fair, Indonesia.

The Sonic 150R was launched in August 2015 in Indonesia. It is powered by a 150 cc liquid-cooled, DOHC, 4-valve, single-cylinder engine mated to a 6-speed constant mesh transmission. The styling of the Sonic 150R was designed with teenage motorcyclists in mind.

The Sonic 150R is built at Honda's Karawang plant, West Java, Indonesia.

In the Philippines, the bike is named RS150 (not to be confused with the RS150R sold in Malaysia, as it is a rebadged Winner that sold in Vietnam).
