= Honda NSR150 =

Sport bike model from Honda

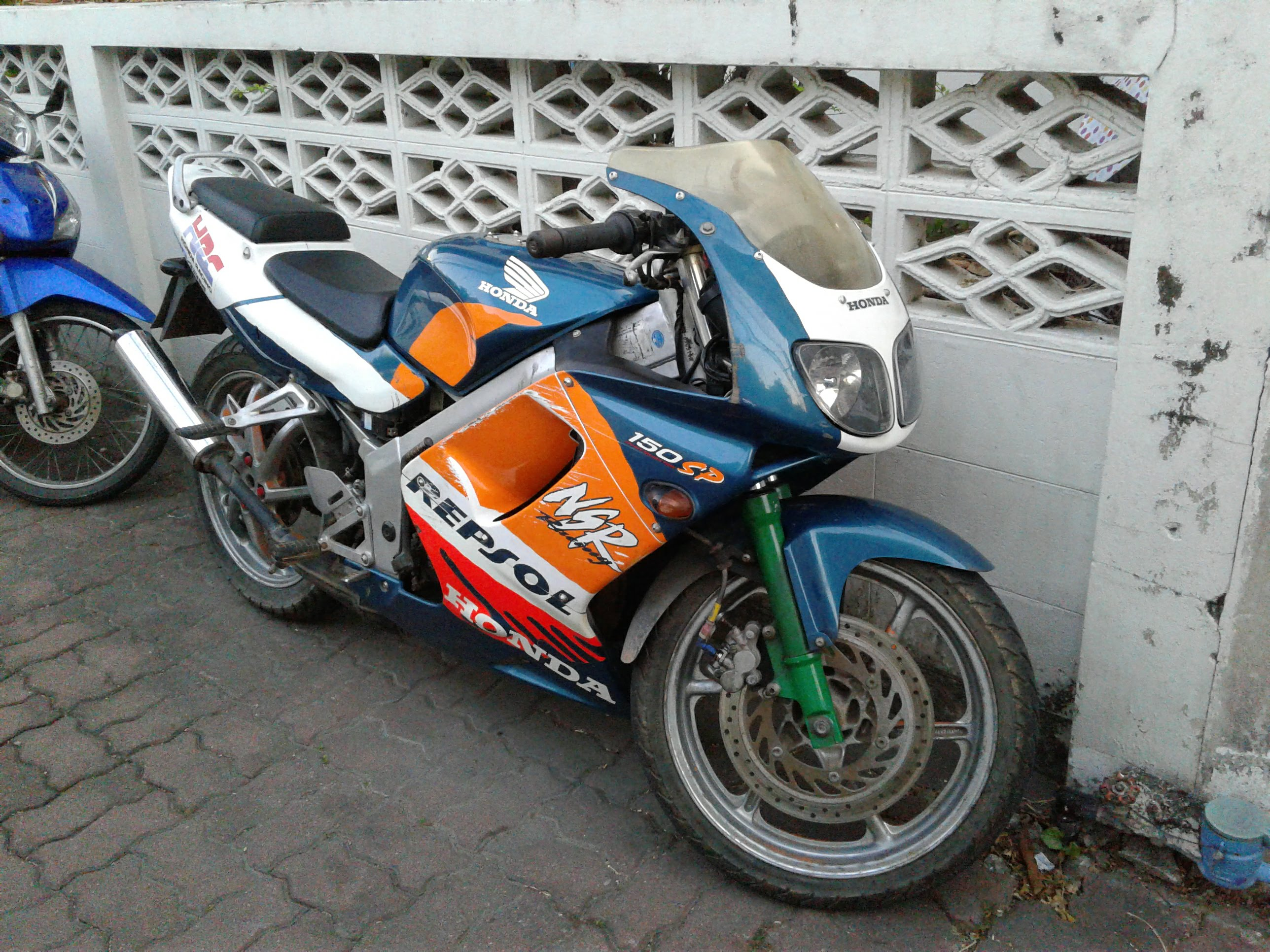
Honda NSR150SP

The Honda NSR150 is a motorcycle produced in Thailand by Honda as Honda NSR and in Taiwan by Kymco under the name Kymco NSR. The early Taiwanese NSR150s were produced with engines imported from Japan. However, later models used engines cast in Taiwan by Kymco.

Due to local regulations, Kymco NSR150 had lower power than the ones made in Thailand because the carburetor was smaller and the ports in the cylinder had slightly different sizes. It is common to switch to a Thai-made cylinder in NSR racing in Taiwan. Due to a significant amount of warranty claims the CDI was programmed to open and then close the RC valve because running cheap 2 stroke oil reduced the power of the engine further.

The Taiwanese and Southeast Asian NSR150's are quite closely related sharing the same stroke and appearance.

Kymco's spare parts supply for Taiwan NSR's is slowly declining with slowed production and competition from easily available aftermarket parts.

YSS aftermarket rear suspension has been available for Taiwanese NSRs since year 2000.

An interesting fact is that Kymco's 2010 Quannon Naked's 37MM front fork assembly can be nearly directly transplanted on Taiwan made NSRs with the help of a small CNC machined washer, directly addressing the problem with "head float" under hard acceleration and stability at higher speeds.
