= Honda Motorcycle Thailand =

Official manufacturer and distributor of Honda motorcycles in Thailand

Thai Honda Co., Ltd.
- Type: Subsidiary
- Industry: Automotive
- Founded: 1986; 40 years ago
- Headquarters: Samut Prakan, Thailand
- Area served: Worldwide
- Products: Motorcycles
- Parent: Honda
- Website: ThaiHonda.co.th

Thai Honda Manufacturing Co., Ltd. (previously known as A.P. Honda Co., Ltd. until March 2021, generally known as Honda Motorcycle Thailand) is the official manufacturer and distributor of Honda motorcycles in Thailand. Its headquarters are in Samut Prakan. Honda Motorcycle Thailand plays a significant role as a center in distributing Honda motorcycles to Asian and European markets.

The company sponsors Thai riders to compete in Grand Prix motorcycle racing (WorldGP), particularly Moto2 class such as Ratthapark Wilairot, Somkiat Chantra, and Thitipong Warokorn.

== Thailand's motorcycle market ==
=== History ===
In the period 1986–1988, the motorcycle market in Thailand sold roughly 200,000 bikes per year. Yamaha and Kawasaki were the market leaders. Honda was third, with a 22% market share. Its reputation in Thailand before the decade of the 1990s was poor. Things changed in 1989 with the introduction of the "Nova", a two-stroke bike that Honda rode to sales leadership in 1989. Honda had forecast sales of 2,000–3,000 Novas per month, but 10,000 per month became the sales norm. In 1997, Honda faced ending production of two-stroke engines at its plant in Lat Krabang. But in 1997, the 1997 Asian financial crisis struck, causing Thais to economise, and the new four-stroke "Wave" and "Dream" models became popular as they used less fuel than two-strokes.

=== Current ===
Thailand motorcycle sales surpassed two million bikes for the first time in 2011, hitting 2.01 million. Sales rose to 2.13 million units in 2012, the highest level ever, before dropping to two million in 2013. In 2014, the market fell by 15% to 1.7 million due to political turmoil and delayed payments for farmers under the rice-pledging scheme. Thailand's motorcycle sales in 2015 totaled 1.68 million bikes, down one percent from 2014. In the first four months of 2016, 559,915 motorcycles were sold, down 3.8% for the same period in 2015. In 2018, overall motorcycle and motorbike sales in Thailand totaled 1,789,000 units, down 1.2% from 2017. The market is expected to decline further in 2019, to 1.76 million units. The motorcycle market in 2018 saw 1.79 million units sold, with Honda selling 1.4 million.

Honda has enjoyed the largest share of the local motorcycle market for 30 years. Honda posted a 78.5% market share in 2018. Yamaha is second, with 15.1%, a figure projected to rise to 16% in 2019.

== Honda motorcycles/scooters manufactured in Thailand ==
- Cruiser: Rebel
- Dualsport: CRF series
- Minibike: Grom/MSX, Monkey, Dax
- Scooter: Scoopy, Zoomer-X, PCX, Click, Icon, Forza, Giorno+, ADV
- Sport bike: CBR series, CB series
- Underbone: Wave, Dream, Super Cub, Hunter Cub
