= Racelogic =

Technology company in the United Kingdom

RACELOGIC Ltd
- Industry: Electronic Measuring & Testing
- Founded: 1992
- Headquarters: Buckingham, UK
- Key people: Julian Thomas (Founder) Simon Wood (CEO)
- Products: VBOX, VBOX Video, VIPS, LabSat, Performance Box
- Services: Vehicle Testing, Motorsport, Motion Capture, Defence, GNSS Device Testing
- Number of employees: 100+ (2022)
- Website: racelogic.co.uk

RACELOGIC Ltd is a technology company based in Buckingham, United Kingdom.

The company specialise in the development of GPS, CAN-bus, Inertial and video based equipment, designing applications for use in vehicle testing, motorsport, marine, defence, film, and GNSS device testing.

RACELOGIC manufacture GPS data loggers, GNSS simulators, in-car video systems and indoor positioning systems.

The company employs more than 100 staff at its head office in the UK and satellite offices in Germany and the USA.

== History ==
The company was founded in 1992 by Julian Thomas after graduating from Durham University with a degree in Physics and Electronics.

Julian started developing electronic control systems for vehicles, launching a Traction Control device in 1993. Car manufacturers were quick to adopt the Electronic stability control device, which reduces the chance of an accident occurring and enhances vehicle acceleration, ⁣ with Aston Martin and Rolls-Royce Limited being two of the first car manufacturers to use the system.

With the US government's decision to turn off GPS selective availability in 2001, GPS signal accuracy went from 100 m to 3 m overnight. Using the effectiveness and flexibility now offered by GPS technology, and the opportunity for high speed, high accuracy GPS devices within the vehicle testing market, RACELOGIC launched its first Velocity Box (a.k.a. VBOX) in 2001. In 2008, it launched its first video data logger, a product that combined multi-camera video with GPS data logging and graphic overlay.

In 2009, RACELOGIC launched LabSat. With the ability to record, replay, and simulate GNSS RF data, it was originally designed to calibrate VBOX units. However, its potential for use in wider applications prompted the commercial launch to manufacturers of GPS devices. Since its launch, LabSat has carved out a successful place in markets as diverse as mobile phone development, aerospace, defence, health and agriculture.

Using the technology RACELOGIC developed in-house for indoor positioning, the company have broken into the film and gaming market in 2020.

== Operations ==
RACELOGIC Ltd provide products and services which fall into four broad categories:

Automotive Testing - Serving the three major automotive manufacturing markets (i.e. Germany, America, Asia), RACELOGIC systems are used to test new designs and vehicle concepts.

Motorsport - RACELOGIC supply all levels of motorsport teams, competitors and engineers with performance meters and data logging devices. The VBOX Video HD2, allows users to record, replay and analyse video footage with synchronised data from their time on track.

GPS Simulation - Launched in 2009 RACELOGIC's LabSat allows companies to repetitively test GNSS equipment from a stationary location by simulating live satellite signals.

Indoor Positioning System - Launched in 2019 RACELOGIC's VBOX Indoor Positioning System, VIPS, allows companies to measure speed and position indoors using an in-house designed Ultra-wideband and Inertial measurement unit.

== Products ==
RACELOGIC design and develop high accuracy test and positioning systems for a wide range of industries.

VBOX GPS data logging products vary from the 10 Hz VBOX Mini, a rugged unit for simple testing to the VBOX 3i which logs at a 100 Hz, and which forms the basis of the VBOX Advanced driver-assistance systems testing packages. Differential GPS and RTK (Real Time Kinematic) solutions allow for high positional accuracy, and inertial measurement unit integration increases the testing scope further. VBOX systems are employed in many types of testing: automotive, marine, open-cast mining, motorsport, aviation, and collision forensics.

VBOX Speed Sensors provide high accuracy speed signals at between 5 Hz and 100 Hz for those that require speed, position, braking distance, or acceleration data without the need for internal logging. VBOX Speed Sensors connect via CAN, digital, or analogue interface to a third-party data logging equipment. All Speed Sensors are compatible with a DGPS Base Station for increased positional accuracy, and the dual antenna variant adds slip and pitch/roll output at 100 Hz.

RACELOGIC video systems combine a digital video recorder with camera and stereo audio inputs, a real-time graphic overlay, and a GPS data logger. As well as capturing GPS and CAN data in the same way as a standard VBOX data logger, video systems like the VBOX Video HD2 also record GPS time synchronised video. This footage can be enhanced with a fully customisable data driven graphic overlay, allowing you to add bar graphs, rotary gauges, text elements, pictures and track maps, showing parameters such as G-force, speed, split times, lap times, etc.

LabSat 3 GNSS simulator gives the ability to record and replay real RF data from up to three satellite systems (GPS, GLONASS and BeiDou) simultaneously. LabSat also integrates with the Video VBOX to record and playback videos, which is synchronised with the GPS data, allowing the user to see the exact conditions experienced during the GPS recording. LabSat recording works with almost any kind of GNSS, including survey grade engines. With high fidelity 2 or 4 bit sampling, LabSat is intended for testing GPS receiver sensitivity.

LabSat 3 Wideband is a GPS simulator with a 56 MHz bandwidth, allowing multiple GNSS signals to be recorded, replayed and simulated. Multiple signals from GPS, GLONASS, BeiDou and Galileo can also be simulated using the RACELOGIC SatGen software.

Performance Box Touch is the successor to the original RACELOGIC PerformanceBox which can be considered to be the first performance meter and became an industry standard. Performance Box Touch is a based performance meter with colour touch screen that allows you to measure G-forces, speed, lap & split times, 0-60, 0–100, braking distance and many more.

VBOX Indoor Positioning System is a UWB and Inertial based position and velocity measurement system designed to be a direct replacement for GPS when testing vehicles indoors. It also has uses in other industries where access to GNSS satellites is not possible. It is different to most UWB solutions in that the positional accuracy is 2–3 cm with an update rate of 100 Hz.
