= Honda CM and CMX series =

Motorcycle series

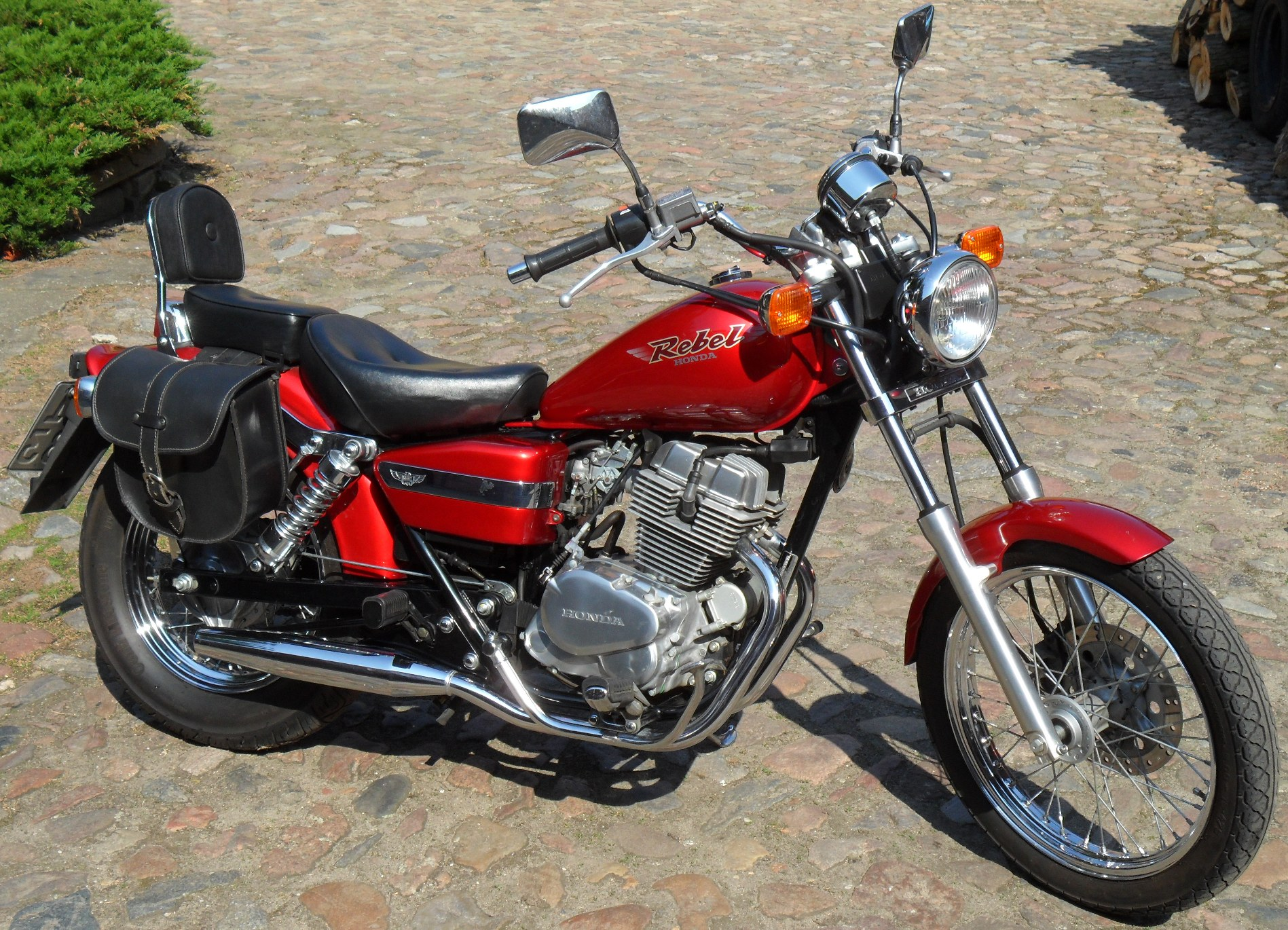
1997 Honda Rebel 250

The Honda CM series is a designation of cruiser-style motorcycles produced by Japanese automobile manufacturer Honda, as listed below sorted by model name:

== First series (CM/CMX) ==
- CM185T (1978–1979)
- CM200 (Twinstar: 1980–1982)
- CM125
- CM250 (1981–1984)
- CMX250 Rebel (1985–1987, 1995–1996, 1998–2016)
- CM400
- CM450
- CMX450 (1986–1987)

== Second series (CMX/Rebel) ==
- CMX250 (2017–present)
- CMX300 (2017–present)
- CMX500 (2017–present)
- CMX1100 (2021–present)
