= Honda Nighthawk 250 =

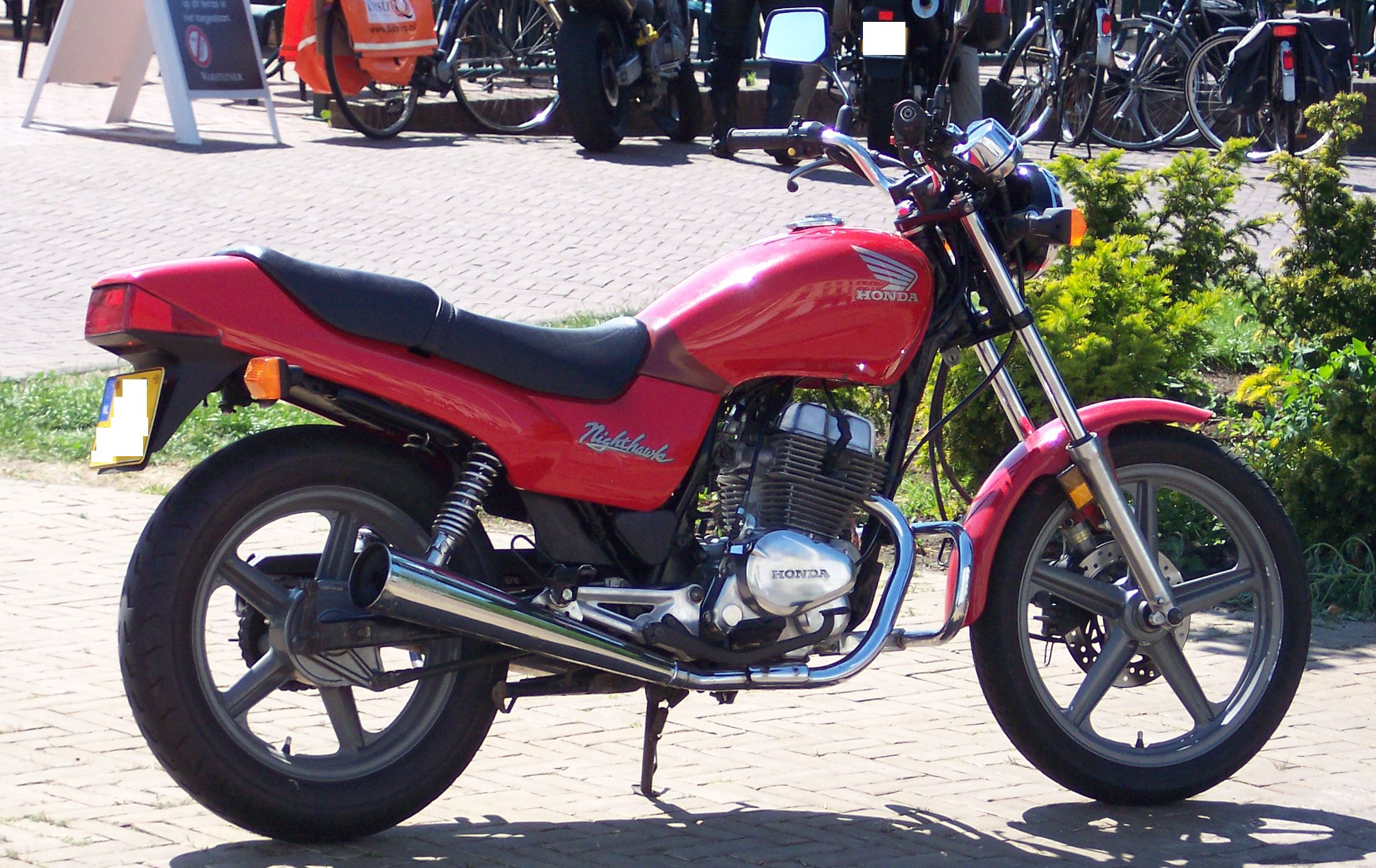
- Manufacturer: Honda
- Also called: CB250 (UK market); CB250 Nighthawk; MC26
- Production: 1992–2008
- Class: Standard
- Engine: 234 cc (14.3 cu in) air-cooled parallel twin
- Bore / stroke: 53.0 mm × 53.0 mm (2.09 in × 2.09 in)
- Compression ratio: 9.2:1
- Power: 21 PS (21 hp)/8,500 rpm
- Torque: 2.0 kgf (20 N)/6,500 rpm
- Ignition type: CDI
- Fuel delivery: Keihin VE37 (single)
- Transmission: 5-speed manual 520-size chain, 104 links
- Frame type: Steel pipe, diamond-shape
- Suspension: Front: Telescopic fork Rear: Swing-arm
- Brakes: Front: Single Disc or drum (Leading/trailing) depending on market Rear: Drum
- Tires: Front: 90/100-18 54S; Rear: 120/90-16 63S
- Rake, trail: 28.5°/109mm
- Wheelbase: 1,425 mm (56.1 in)
- Dimensions: L: 2,090 mm (82 in); W: 755 mm (29.7 in); H: 1,090 mm (43 in)
- Seat height: Cast wheel models:745 mm (29.3 in); Spoke wheel models:755 mm (29.7 in)
- Fuel capacity: 16 L (4.2 US gal)
- Oil capacity: 1.6 L (56 imp fl oz; 54 US fl oz)
- Turning radius: 2.3 m (7.5 ft)
- Related: Honda Rebel 250; Honda CD250U

The Honda Nighthawk 250 is a standard motorcycle made by Honda beginning in 1992.

It has a 234 cc (14.3 cu in) air-cooled 360°-crank parallel-twin engine. With its style mimicking the 1991-2003 Nighthawk 750 (RC38), it utilized the 1985–87 Rebel 250 engine with all new wiring and components and reshaped the Rebel cam cover slightly as well as incorporating a larger carburetor. This engine is a single carburetor version of the CD250U engine, which generates a smooth exhaust sound due to its 360°-crank, evenly spaced combustion.

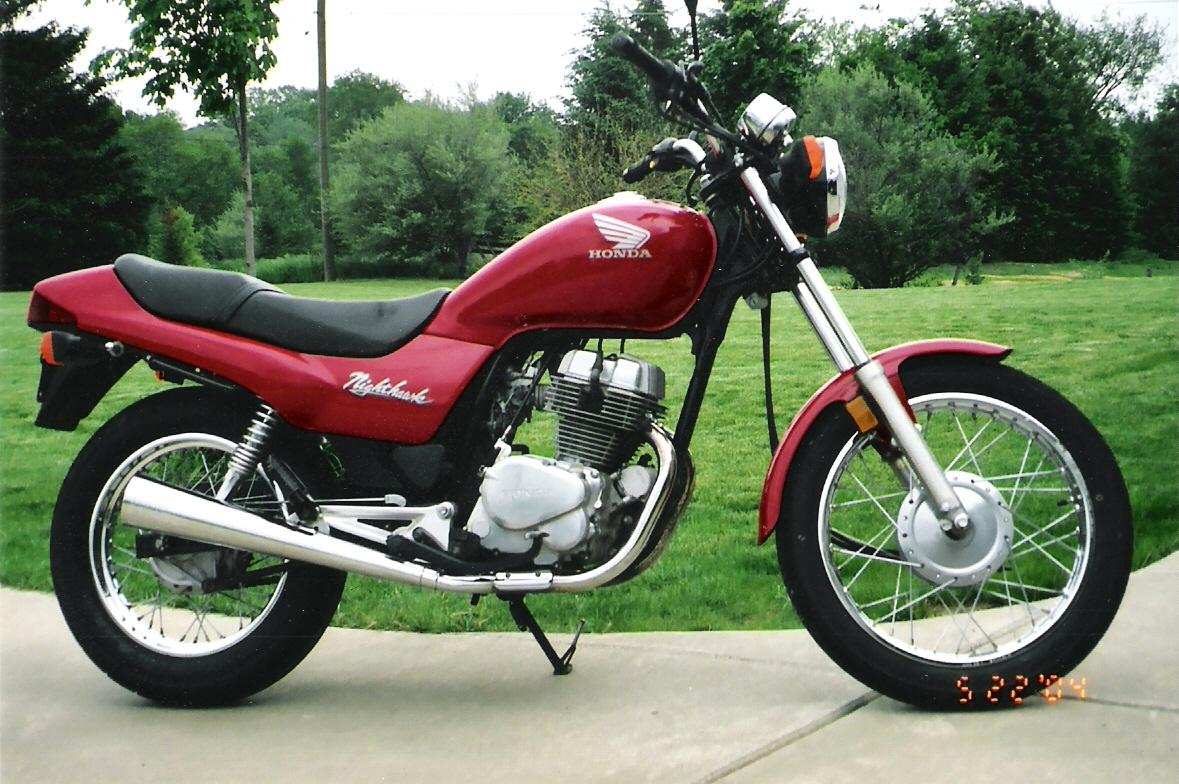
The US version Nighthawk 250 with front drum brake and spoked wheels

In contrast to the Honda Rebel 250 (MC13), which offers very similar specifications, the Nighthawk 250 is considered to be a standard street motorcycle for urban use. Its small size and low seat make it a popular model for beginners and riders of smaller stature. It is often used in Motorcycle Safety Foundation (MSF) motorcycle training in the US. It has drum brakes and spoked wheels at front and rear in the US, though models in the Australian, U.K., Japanese, and other markets had a single disc brake in front, drum brake in rear, and front as well as rear Italian Grimeca alloy wheels with tubeless tyres.

== Reviews ==
In his column in Roadbike, Andrew MacDonald praised the CB250 Nighthawk for its durability, citing the example of an urban commuter who had ridden one for 107,000 miles over a 16-year period as his only mode of transportation, with zero engine work required.

== History ==
While the first Nighthawk 650 was manufactured in 1982, the Nighthawk 250 was manufactured from 1992. The bike's lineage can be traced back to the Honda CM185T and CM200T Twinstar of 1978 -1982, as it retains the same bottom end and bore at 53.0mm with an increased stroke of 53.0mm resulting in a capacity of 233.9 cc (14.27 cu in). The motorcycle changed little over the years except for color.

With its durability, this engine is still being produced in Thailand by GPX, coupled with a 6-speed transmission and an oil cooler.
