= Suzuki GN250 =

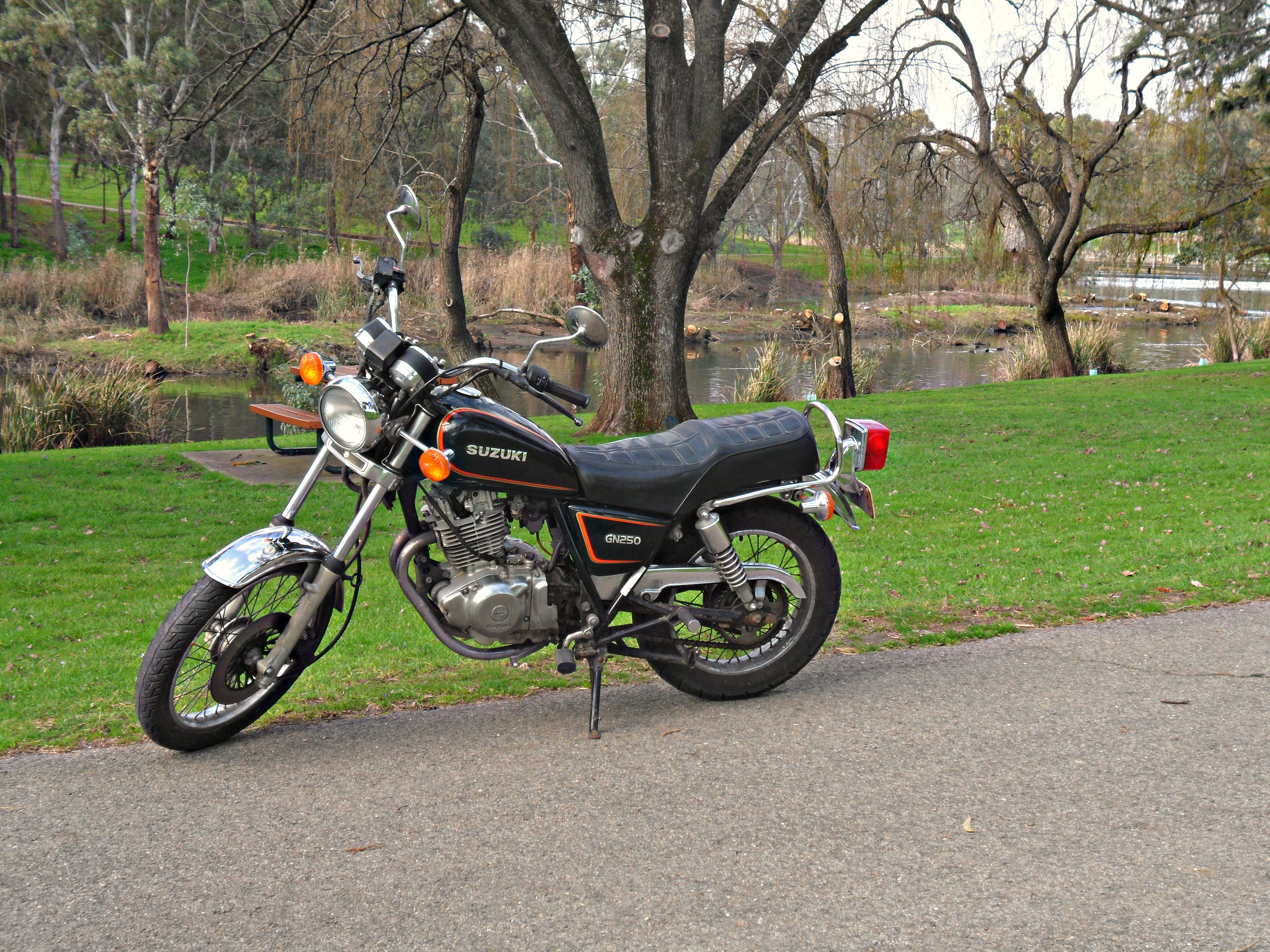
- 1993 model
- Parent company: Suzuki
- Successor: Suzuki TU250
- Class: Standard
- Engine: 250 cc (15 cu in), 4 Valve, 4-stroke, air-cooled, single
- Transmission: 5-speed manual, wet clutch
- Related: Suzuki GN series

The Suzuki GN250 is a 4-valve single cylinder, air-cooled SOHC, 250 cc (15 cu in), 4 stroke standard motorcycle made by Suzuki Motors since 1982. Its smaller cousin is known as GN125 with a smaller displacement (125cc) engine (still under production in Columbia, possibly other regions). The GN250 is a cruiser-like street oriented popular learner's bike. There was also the GN400, on the UK market between 1982 and 1984, which unusually used a 6-volt electric system.

It has a speedometer, odometer with trip, high beam, turn indicators, and a gear position indicator. For later versions, the engine automatically shuts off if the bike is put into gear when side stand is down. The Suzuki GZ250 is a more cruiser-oriented version of GN250 in terms of dimensions with same drivetrain. Suzuki TU250 is a modern evolution of this bike with EFI and different styling.

== Specifications ==
- Overall Length: 2,030 mm (79.9 in)
- Overall Width: 840 mm (33.1 in)
- Overall Height: 1,120 mm (44.1 in)
- Wheelbase: 1,350 mm (53.1 in)
- Dry Weight: 128 kg (281 lbs)

== Engines ==
Engine
Name	Type	Engine code	Output@rpm	Torque@rpm	0–100 km/h,s	Top speed	Years
Suzuki GN 250	Air-cooled 249 cc single cylinder SOHC, 4 valves		16 kilowatts (21 hp) @ 8,500 rpm	19 newton-metres (14 lbf⋅ft) @ 5,500 rpm		115 kilometres per hour (71 mph)	1982
