= Suzuki GSX125 =

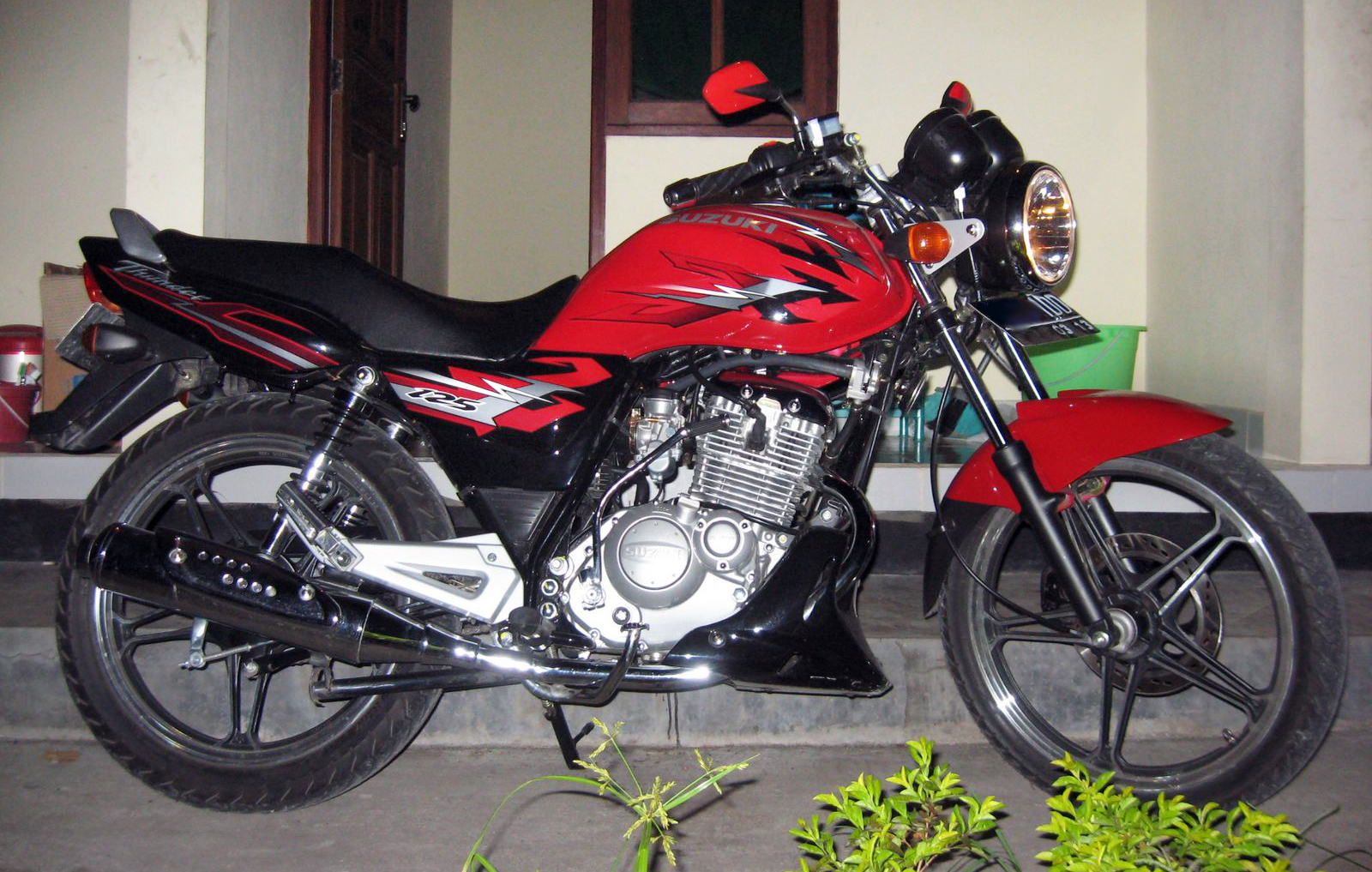
- Manufacturer: Suzuki Motor Corporation
- Predecessor: Suzuki GS125
- Engine: 124 cc (7.6 cu in), 4-stroke, OHC, air-cooled, single
- Bore / stroke: 57.0 x 48.8 mm
- Power: 7.8kw(10.45HP) / 9000 rpm
- Torque: 9.2 nm / 7000 rpm
- Transmission: 5 Speed Constant Mesh
- Suspension: Front & Rear: Spring Hydraulic Damping
- Brakes: Front: Hydraulic Disc; Rear: Internal Expanding Drum
- Tires: Front: 2.75-18 Tubeless; Rear: 90/90-18 Tubeless
- Wheelbase: 1270 mm
- Dimensions: L: 1990 mm W: 755 mm H: 1075 mm
- Seat height: 770 mm
- Fuel capacity: 14.2 L (3.1 imp gal; 3.8 US gal)
- Fuel consumption: 35-45 Km/L

The Suzuki GSX125 is a small entry-level 125cc standard motorcycle designed specifically for emerging markets such as China, South Asia, Southeast Asia, Africa and Latin America. Mostly, this motorcycle was built in the China by Suzuki's joint venture partners, Haojue and Jinan Qingqi for local and export markets.

The GSX125 is related to GS125/150, RV125 VanVan, GN125, DR125, DR-Z125, TU125, GZ125/150 and EN/GSX150.

== Other countries and names ==
This bike is sold with numerous names around the world, such as Suzuki Yes or Suzuki Huracán in Latin America and Suzuki Thunder 125 in Indonesia. In the grey markets such as in United Kingdom or Japan, this motorcycle mostly sold as Suzuki EN125. In China, this motorcycle is also sold as Haojue HJ125 or Qingqi QS125.
