= Honda CMX250C =

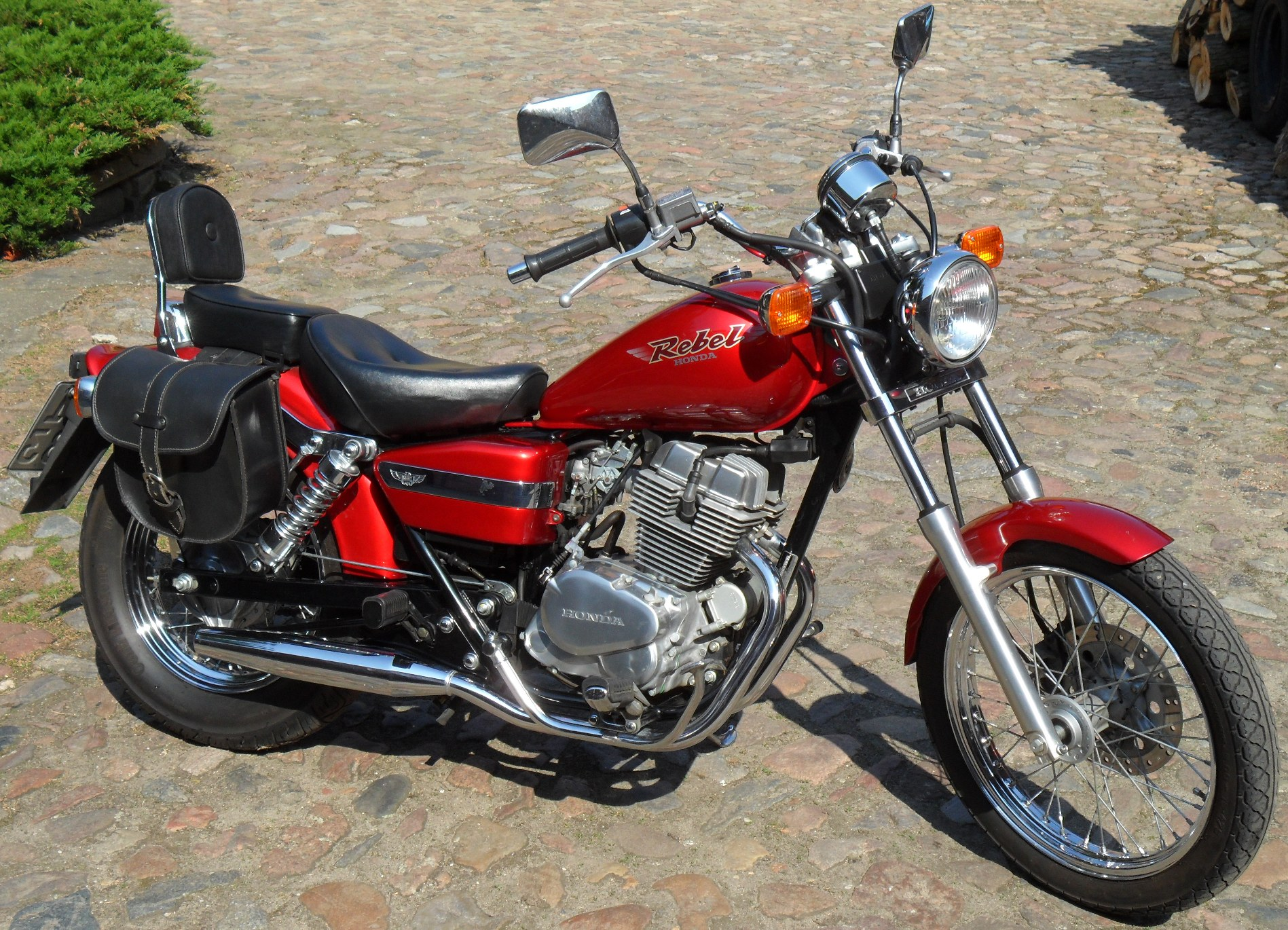
- Manufacturer: Honda
- Also called: Rebel 250
- Production: 1985–1987, 1996–1997, 1999–2016
- Predecessor: Honda CM250C Custom
- Successor: Honda Rebel 300 and 500
- Class: Cruiser
- Engine: 234 cc (14.3 cu in) air-cooled SOHC two valves per cyl. straight-twin
- Bore / stroke: 53.0 mm × 53.0 mm (2.09 in × 2.09 in)
- Compression ratio: 9.2:1
- Top speed: 79 mph (127 km/h)
- Power: 16.1 hp (12.0 kW)
- Torque: 12.4 lb⋅ft (16.8 N⋅m)
- Ignition type: CDI
- Transmission: 5-speed, manual, chain drive
- Frame type: Tubular steel double cradle
- Suspension: Front: 33 mm fork; 120 mm (4.7 in) travel Rear: Dual shock absorbers with five-position spring-preload adjustability; 2.9-inch travel
- Brakes: Front: single-disc with twin-piston caliper Rear: drum
- Tires: Front: 3.00"-18"; Rear: 130/90-15
- Rake, trail: 30° 40', 113 mm (4.4 in)
- Wheelbase: 1,450 mm (57 in)
- Seat height: 676 mm (26.6 in)
- Weight: 139 kg (306 lb) (dry); 145 kg (320 lb) (wet)
- Fuel capacity: 9.8 L (2.2 imp gal; 2.6 US gal), incl. 2.6 L (0.57 imp gal; 0.69 US gal) reserve
- Fuel consumption: 52–62.6 mpg_{‑US} (4.52–3.76 L/100 km; 62.4–75.2 mpg_{‑imp})
- Related: Honda CM200T Twinstar; Honda CMX450 Rebel; Honda CB250 Nighthawk

The Honda CMX250, or Rebel 250 or Honda Peronist, is a 234 cc (14.3 cu in) cruiser-style motorcycle made by Honda on and off since 1985. It uses the same 234 cc (14.3 cu in) straight-twin engine as the Honda Nighthawk 250 standard. The Rebel is part of the CM series of cruisers. It is commonly used in the Motorcycle Safety Foundation's certified rider-training courses.

The Rebel's fuel consumption averages 52–62.6 mpg_{‑US} (4.52–3.76 L/100 km; 62.4–75.2 mpg_{‑imp}). The 1996 Rebel had the best fuel economy, 62.6 miles per US gallon (3.76 L/100 km; 75.2 mpg_{‑imp}), of the 352 past and current models tested in the 2010 Motorcycle Consumer News (MCN) Performance Index. By 2012, the 1996 Rebel's fuel economy had been exceeded by several models on the MCN Performance Index, led by the Yamaha Virago 250 at 66.9 mpg_{‑US} (3.52 L/100 km; 80.3 mpg_{‑imp}). Its maximum speed is 70 miles per hour (110 km/h), and 0 to 60 mph (0 to 97 km/h) time is 11.86 seconds, with a 0 to 1/4 mi (0.00 to 0.40 km) time of 17.86 seconds at 68.55 mph (110.32 km/h). Its wet weight is 320 lb (150 kg).

It has a single disc brake in the front and a drum in the rear. The only gauge is a speedometer that includes gear recommendations based on speed; there is no tachometer. The transmission is a standard down-1st, up-2nd to 5th 5-speed.

The September 1985 issue of Motorcyclist magazine, when the Rebel was first introduced, said, "by targeting the bike to a young audience, such as those who watch MTV, Honda hopes to attract newcomers and expand the motorcycle market ... Honda is not marketing this motorcycle as a woman's bike."

According to American Honda, 2016 will be the last model year for the Honda Rebel 250 to be sold there. The entirely new version which is derived from the CBR250R was unveiled at the 2017 Tokyo Motorcycle Show in Japan.

== Police use ==
The Metropolitan Police Department in Washington, D.C., started using Rebels in the early 1980s, replacing Vespa scooters. However, by the mid-2000s, they started replacing the Rebels with Harley Davidson XL 883 Sportsters, citing a need for more power, durability, and visibility.

== See also ==
- Kymco Venox 250
- Suzuki Marauder GZ 250
- Suzuki TU250
- Yamaha DragStar 250
