= Honda CM250C =

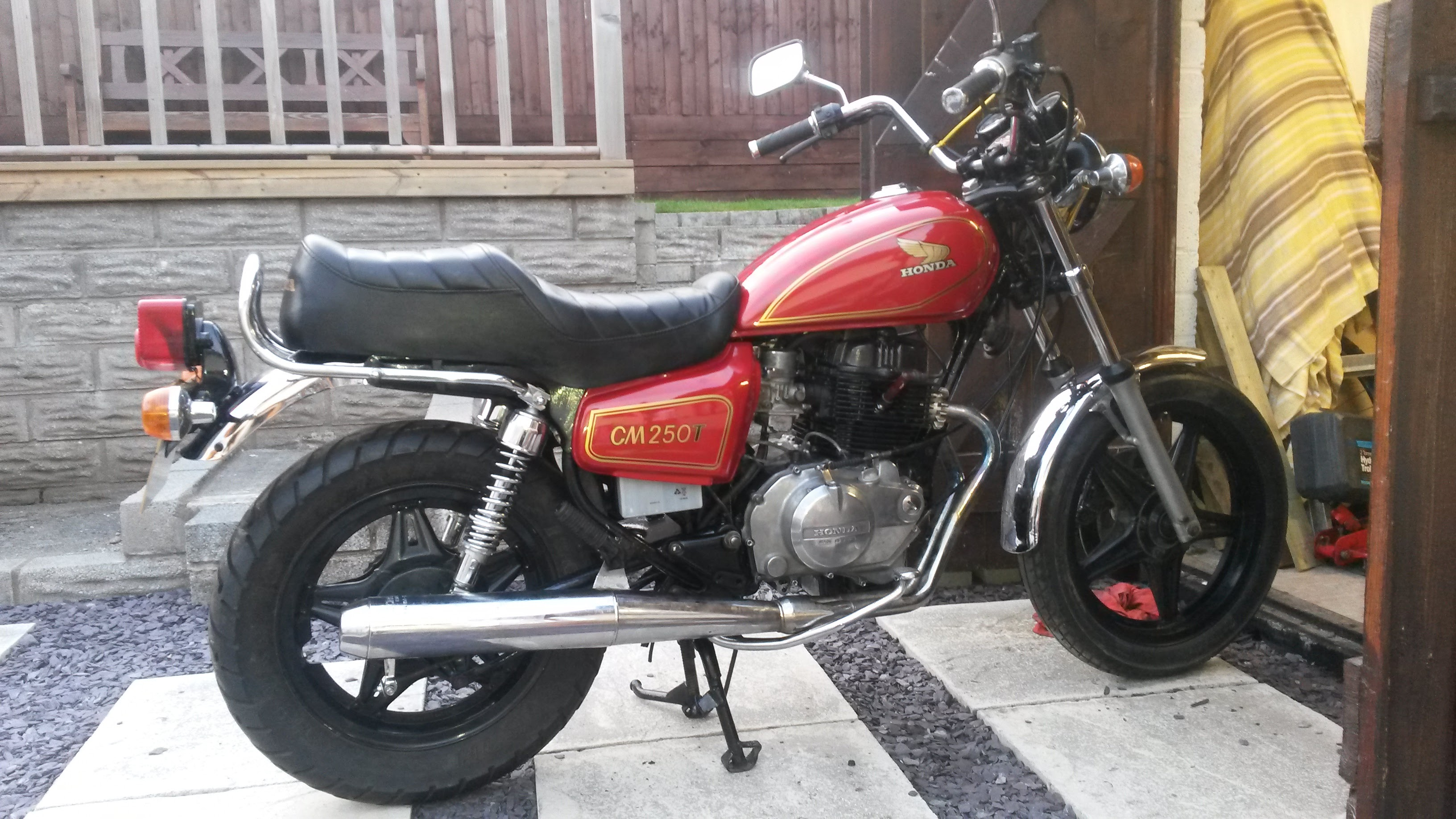
- UK Spec Honda CM250T
- Manufacturer: Honda Motor Company
- Production: 1981–1983
- Predecessor: Honda CM200T Twinstar
- Class: Cruiser
- Engine: 234 cc (14.3 cu in) air-cooled, four stroke upright twin
- Bore / stroke: 53 mm × 53 mm (2.1 in × 2.1 in)
- Compression ratio: 9.4:1
- Ignition type: Capacitor discharge electronic ignition. Electric start only.
- Transmission: Five speed manual, chain final drive
- Frame type: Open diamond; tubular steel; engine as stressed member
- Suspension: Telescopic front: swingarm, twin shock absorber rear
- Brakes: Drum front and rear
- Tyres: Front, 3.25S 18-4PR: rear 110/90-16 59S
- Wheelbase: 1.28 m (4 ft 2 in)
- Dimensions: L: 1.99 m (6 ft 6 in); W: 0.845 m (2 ft 9.3 in); H: 1.105 m (3 ft 7.5 in)
- Seat height: .73 m (2 ft 5 in)
- Weight: 122 kg (269 lb) (dry)
- Fuel capacity: 12.5 L (2.7 imp gal; 3.3 US gal)
- Related: Honda CM125; Honda CD200 RoadMaster; Honda CD250U

The Honda CM250 is a 234 cc (14.3 cu in) parallel twin cylinder air-cooled OHC four-stroke cruiser motorcycle produced by the Honda corporation from 1981 to 1983 with a top speed of 85 mph and delivering 70mpg. The 234cc North American market variant was coded as the CM250C and was the precursor to the current Honda CMX250C, also known as the Honda Rebel 250. The European market variant was identified as the CM250TB.

== Description ==
The CM250TB is based on the Honda Superdream CB250N engine but with a five-speed and not six-speed gearbox. The model is instead characterised by its North American cruiser styling with stepped seat, high handlebars, 'megaphone' exhaust silencers, teardrop-shaped tank and many chromium-plated and polished alloy parts. The quality of the chromium finish and polished alloy meant corrosion was a problem, the outside of the engine casings becoming white and furring up in damp or winter conditions. Particularly vulnerable to deterioration in finish was the exhaust system balance box. Moreover, the front disc brake was also noted as likely to seize as a result of low resistance to corrosion. For the 1982 and 1984 production years, CM250C had a chain drive whilst in the 1983 production year it featured a belt drive. The CM250T has an inverted tooth type camchain and was fitted with Honda Comstar cast alloy wheels as standard.

Frame numbers for the 1981–84 CM250TB start MC05-20.

American models had a different 17 bhp (13 kW) engine compared with the UK model's 27 bhp (20 kW) engine.
