= Honda CD250U =

Motorcycle

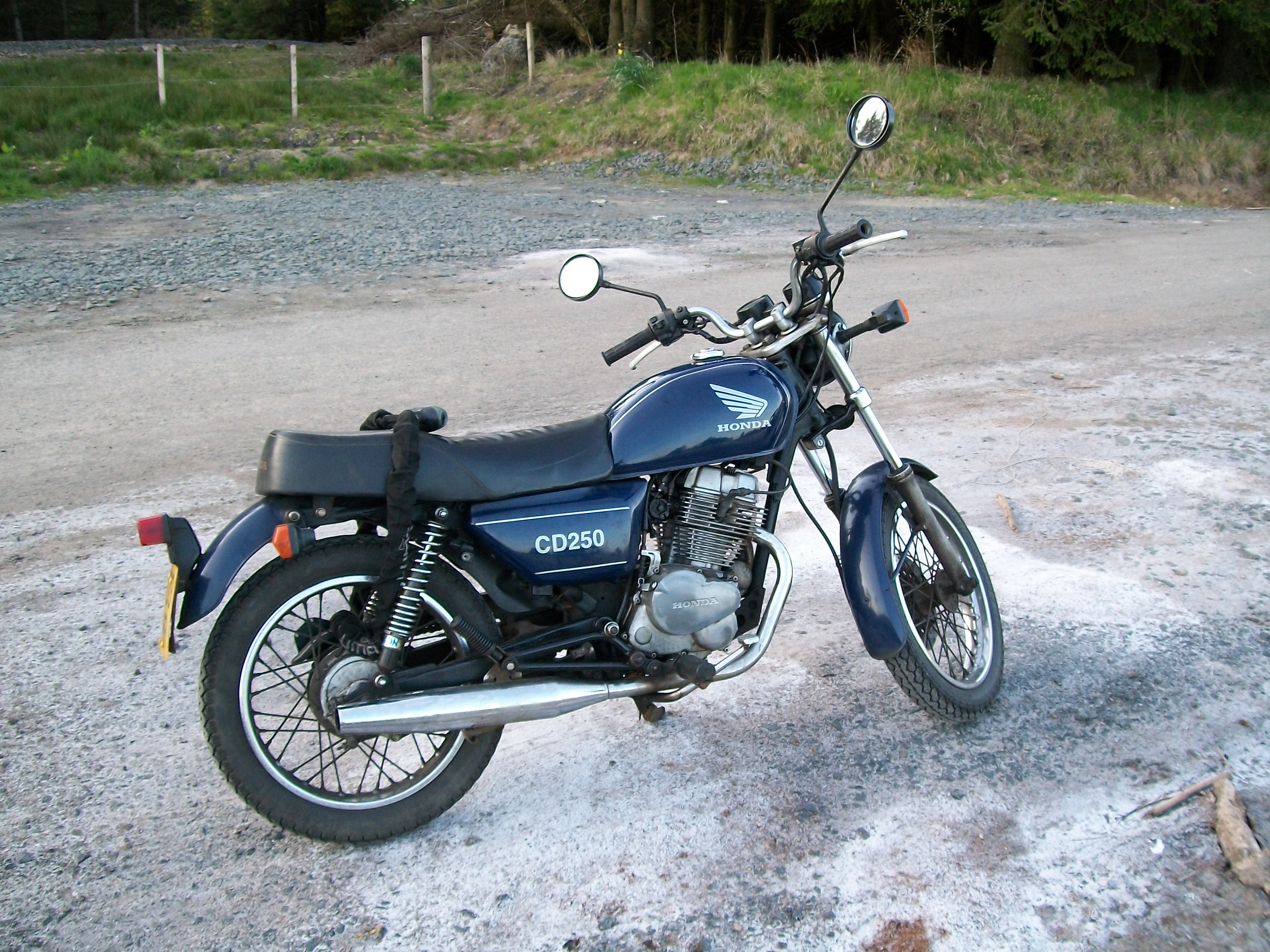
- Honda CD250U
- Manufacturer: Honda Motor Company
- Production: 1988–1993
- Predecessor: Honda CD200 Benly
- Class: Standard
- Engine: 233 cc (14.2 cu in), fourstroke, air-cooled, upright twin
- Ignition type: Capacitor discharge electronic ignition
- Transmission: 5-speed manual
- Frame type: Diamond
- Suspension: Front: telescopic Rear: swingarm
- Brakes: Front: Single disc Rear: drum
- Tyres: Front: 3.00-17-4PR; Rear: 3.25-17-6PR
- Wheelbase: 1.325 m (4 ft 4.2 in)
- Dimensions: L: 2.000 m (6 ft 6.7 in); W: 0.765 m (2 ft 6.1 in); H: 1.060 m (3 ft 5.7 in)
- Seat height: 0.770 m (2 ft 6.3 in)
- Fuel capacity: 10 L (2.2 imp gal; 2.6 US gal)
- Related: Honda CD200 Benly; Honda CD125 Benly; Honda CM200; Honda CM250C

The Honda CD250 is a 233 cc (14.2 cu in), air-cooled, four stroke, upright twin motorcycle which was retailed by Honda in the UK from 1988 to 1993. It has a single front disc brake and a rear drum. It has two into two exhausts, together with electric starting and capacitor discharge electronic (CDI) ignition.

The engine is a 360-degree parallel twin, with the cylinders inclined forwards at 15 degrees from vertical and a chain-driven single overhead cam. The fuel tank holds 10 L (2.2 imp gal; 2.6 US gal) of petrol (with a 1.8 L (0.40 imp gal; 0.48 US gal) reserve capacity). A diamond frame is used, with telescopic front forks and a rear swingarm.

Very similar to the Honda Benly range of cycles, but the CDU has twin CV carbs and a 5-speed gearbox . No tachometer in the instrumentation, only a speedometer and supplementary lighting for neutral, indicators and high-beam. Gear change ratios are placed around the speedometer to indicate gear change speed ranges. A dualseat is standard fitting. A single disc brake is fitted to the front, a small drum being retained at the rear. The only CD model not to have a fully enclosed final drive chain.

The CD250U has a top speed between 70 and 80 mph, depending on wind conditions and gradient, and passenger / luggage.

Very economical, 80 mpg; though some claim they are able to get up to 90 mpg (imp).

Rickman made a full fairing option, and the model was used by police units in the early 1990s.

The engine was also used in the later CM250 Rebel and CB "Two Fifty" models (also known and marketed as the "Night Hawk" in the U.S.)

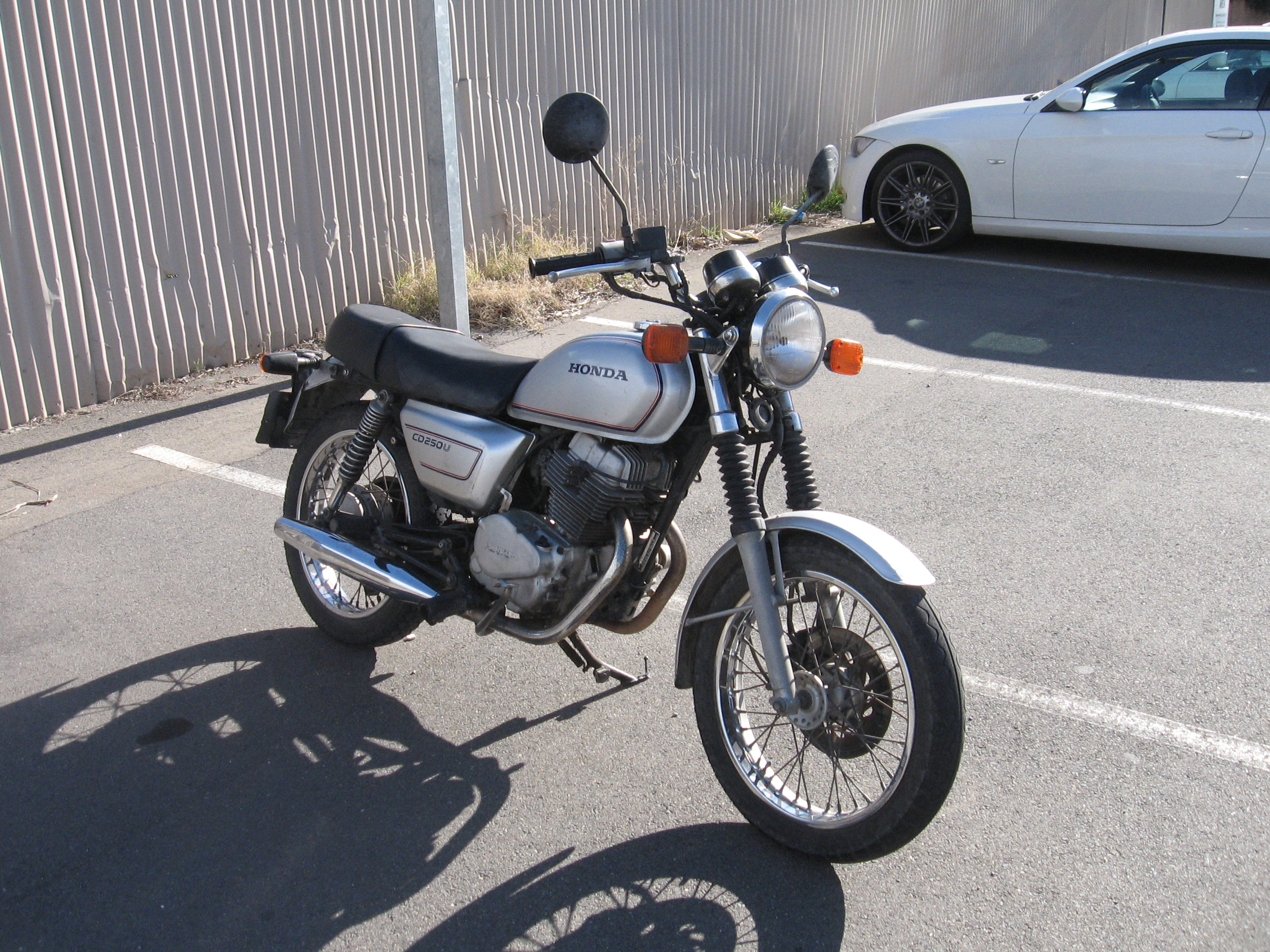
Honda CD250U, 1990 model
