= Honda CD125TC Benly =

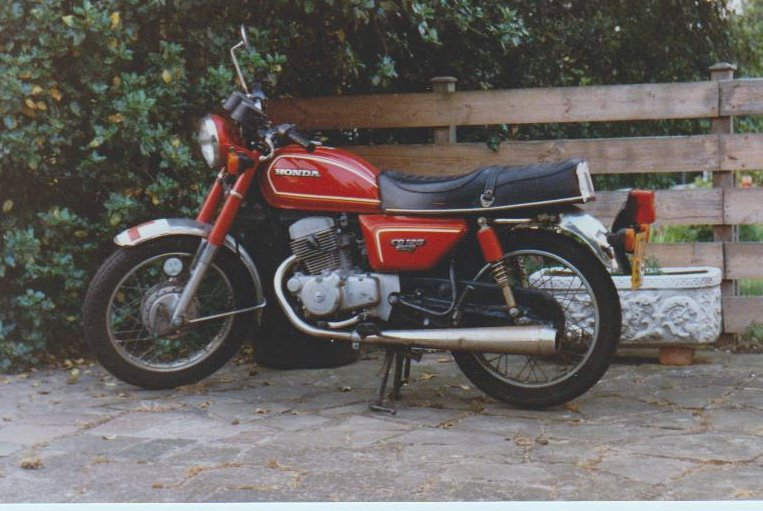
- 1983 Honda CD125TC Benly
- Manufacturer: Honda Motor Company
- Production: 1982–1985 (UK)
- Class: Standard
- Engine: 124 cc (7.6 cu in) air-cooled, four-stroke, upright twin, single carburettor
- Ignition type: Capacitor discharge electronic ignition, electric start only
- Transmission: 4-speed constant mesh, manual. Chain final drive
- Frame type: Open-diamond; tubular steel; engine as stressed member
- Suspension: Front: telescopic Rear: swingarm, twin shock absorber
- Brakes: Drum front and rear
- Wheelbase: 1.280 m (4 ft 2.4 in)
- Dimensions: L: 1.990 m (6 ft 6.3 in); W: .845 m (2 ft 9.3 in); H: 1.105 m (3 ft 7.5 in)
- Seat height: .744 m (2 ft 5.3 in)
- Fuel capacity: 13 L (2.9 imp gal; 3.4 US gal)
- Related: Honda CM125; Honda CB125TD Super Dream; Honda CD175; Honda CD200 RoadMaster; Honda CD250U

The Honda CD125TC Benly is a 124 cc (7.6 cu in), air-cooled, four-stroke, twin-cylinder "commuter" style motorcycle manufactured by the Honda Motor Company between 1982 and 1985 for the United Kingdom. Its engine size and power output were designed to conform to provisional licence restrictions of the time and it was a version of the Honda CD200 Benly introduced in the late 1970s, with the same four-speed constant mesh transmission (as the 200) but electric start only. The machine was identical in all other respects apart from the engine barrel size. It was equipped with an enclosed chain and capacitor discharge electronic ignition. Brakes were drum front and rear and it had both centre- and side-stands. Electrics were 12 volt, and the battery was housed in the right-hand, side-panel. The left-hand panel contained a small toolkit. Instrumentation was by way of two handlebar-mounted binnacles. One contained a speedometer, with odometer and trip meter and was in miles per hour with markings for kilometres and maximum speeds in gears. The other contained warning lights for main beam, ignition/neutral and indicators.
