= Kymco Venox 250 =

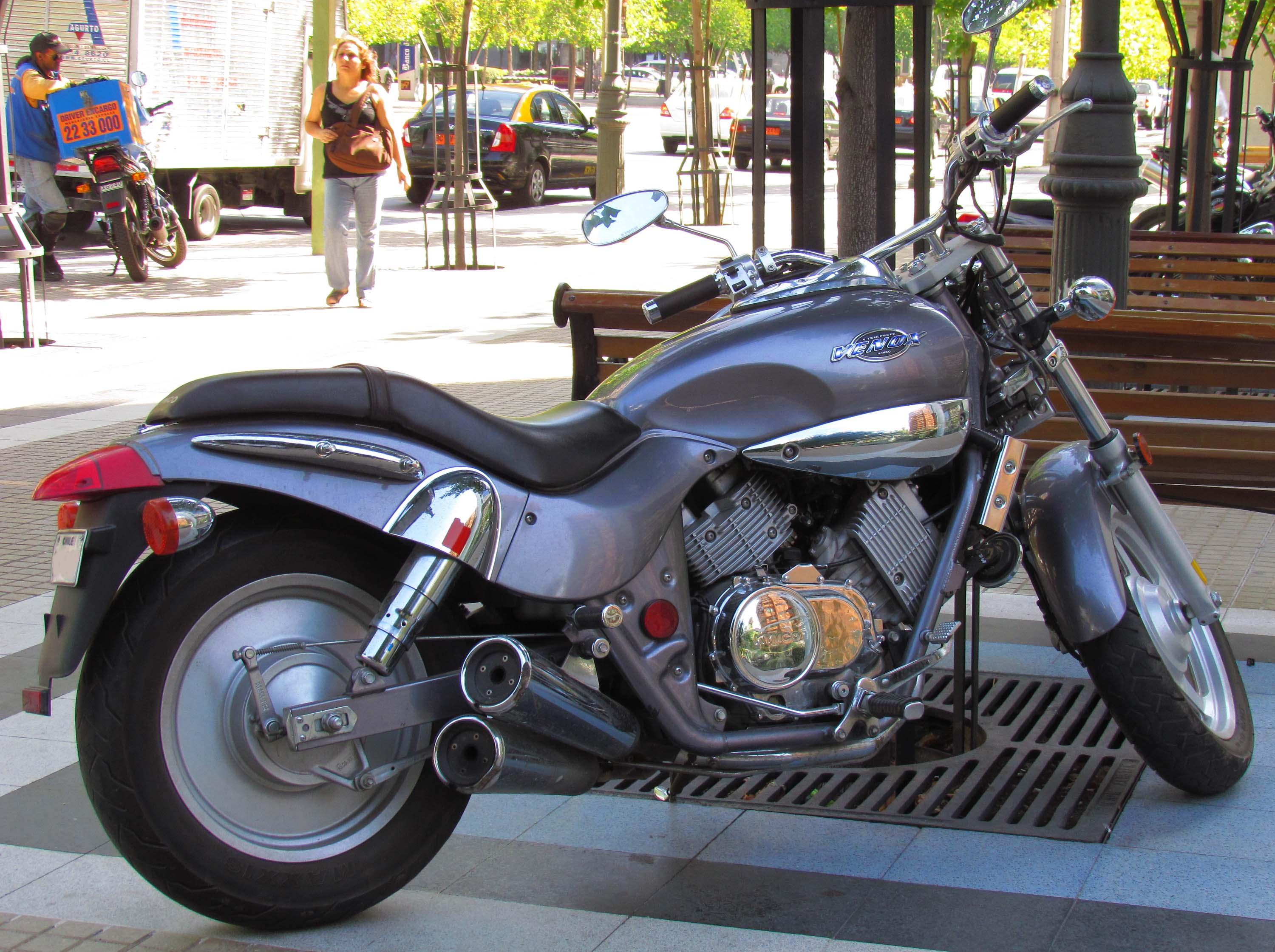
- 2008 Venox 250
- Manufacturer: Kwang Yang Motor Company, Ltd. (Kymco)
- Class: Cruiser
- Engine: 249.4 cc DOHC 4 valve 90 degree V-twin
- Power: 20.5 kW (28 hp) @10500 rpm (claimed)
- Torque: 19.8 N·m (14.6 ft·lbf) @8500 rpm (claimed)
- Transmission: 5-speed manual
- Tires: FR: 120/80-17; RR:150/80-15
- Wheelbase: 1620 mm (64 in)
- Dimensions: L: 2325 mm (92 in); W: 840 mm (33 in); H: 1080 mm (43 in)
- Seat height: 27 in (690 mm)
- Weight: 175 kg (386 lb) (claimed) (dry)
- Fuel capacity: 14 L (3.7 US gal)

The Kymco Venox is a cruiser style motorcycle produced by Taiwanese Kwang Yang Motor Company under the Kymco brand. While it is the largest motorcycle made by Kymco (though they offer larger scooters and ATVs), at 249 cc the Venox is considered a light cruiser.

== Engine ==
The Venox's engine cylinders are set in a 90° V-twin configuration. It has dual dual overhead cams, four valves per cylinder, and is liquid cooled. All of this allows the Venox to offer 28 horsepower (21 kW), an improvement of 10 horsepower (7.5 kW) over 250 cruisers like the Honda Rebel.

== Styling ==
Kymco hired German firm Naumann Design to design the Venox. Naumann also designed the MZ 1000S, as well as projects for Honda and Audi.

The Venox is designed in the cruiser style with several design elements being borrowed from popular bikes made by other manufacturers. The solid rear wheel, for example, is reminiscent of the Harley-Davidson V-Rod and the Fat Boy's solid front. The distinctive trumpeted twin exhaust as well as the front wheel has been described as echoing the Honda Magna.

Certain aspects of the Venox's design more closely resemble larger displacement bikes. The 63-inch (1,600 mm) wheelbase is typical of a bike with a 500-700 cc engine. Faux chrome plates under the 3.7 gallon fuel tank, already a gallon more than other light cruisers, give it the appearance of a long range cruiser. Overall, most dealership and road tester informal surveys show that many bikers guess the Venox at an engine displacement between 500 and 800 cc.

The bike has no tachometer, but the engine has a rev limiter which does not allow a rider to take the engine beyond its redline. The fuel valve on the Venox is automatic. It does not need to be switched to on before starting, automatically switches to reserve when low, and is connected to a low fuel light on the instrument panel.

== Venox 250i ==
An updated version, the Venox 250i, was introduced in 2006.
