= Honda CMX1100 Rebel =

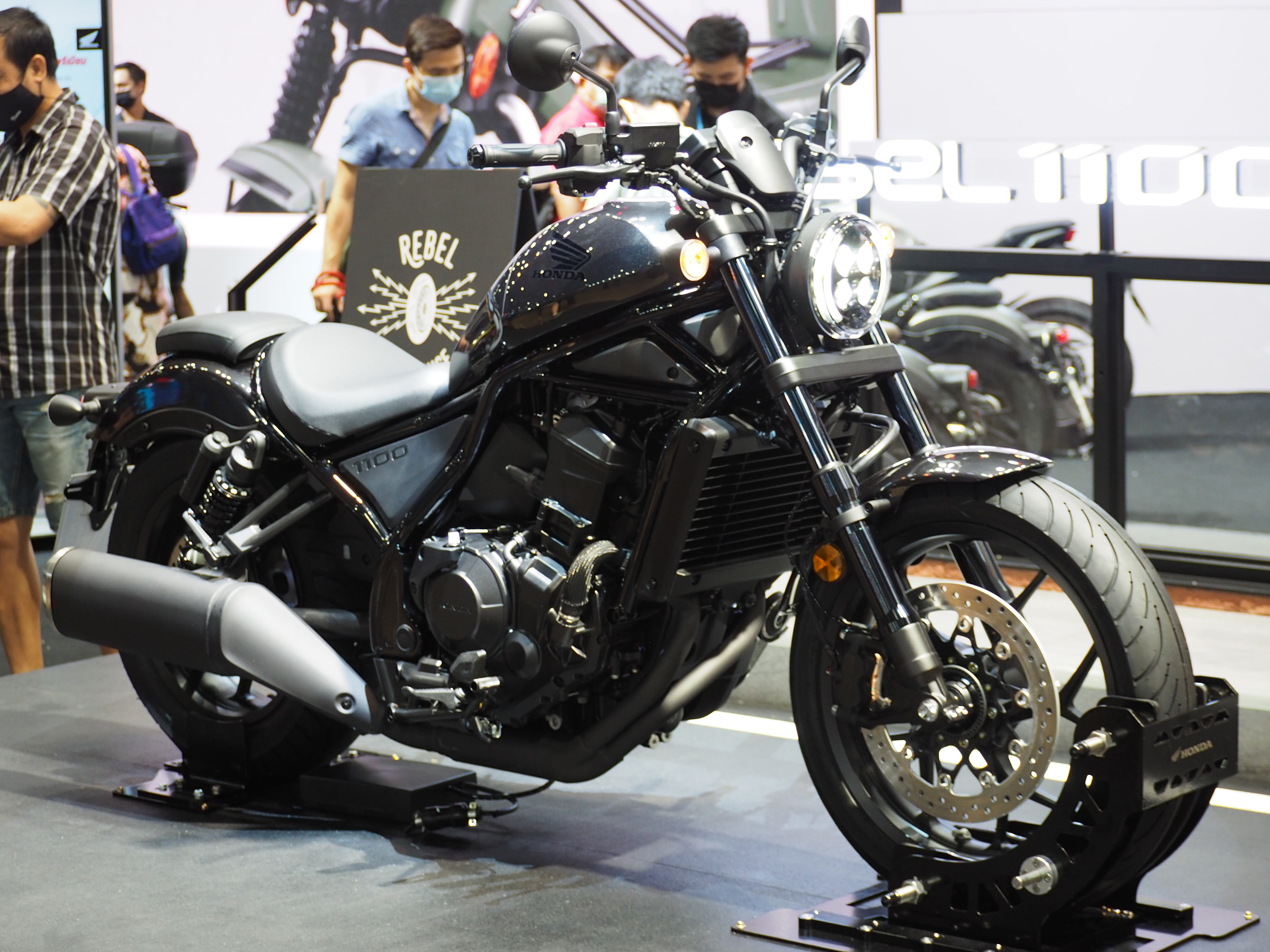
- Honda CMX1100 Rebel in January 2021
- Manufacturer: Honda
- Also called: Honda CMX1100; Honda Rebel 1100
- Production: 2021–present
- Class: Cruiser
- Engine: 1,084 cc (66.1 cu in) liquid-cooled 4-stroke 8-valve DOHC Straight-twin engine
- Bore / stroke: 92.0 mm × 81.5 mm (3.62 in × 3.21 in)
- Compression ratio: 10.5
- Power: 65 kW (87 hp) at 7,250 rpm^{[claimed]}
- Torque: 98 N⋅m (72 lb⋅ft) at 4,750 rpm^{[claimed]}
- Transmission: 6-speed manual 6-speed dual-clutch
- Suspension: Front: 431 mm telescopic fork Rear: Dual shocks, 95 mm travel
- Tires: Front: 130/70-18; Rear: 180/65-16
- Wheelbase: 1,520 mm (59.8 in)
- Dimensions: L: 2,240 mm (88 in); W: 834 mm (32.8 in); H: 1,115 mm (43.9 in)
- Seat height: 700 mm (28 in)
- Weight: 223–233 kg (492–514 lb)^{[claimed]} (wet)

The Honda CMX1100 Rebel (also called the Honda CMX1100 or Rebel 1100) is a cruiser motorcycle produced by the Japanese company Honda.

== History ==
In 2021, the Honda CMX1100 Rebel was launched after the "smaller sister model" Honda CMX500 Rebel had been selling well since 2016. It has a similar engine to the Honda CRF1100L Africa Twin. The touring version CMX1100 Rebel T followed in 2023.

== Specifications ==
=== Engine ===
The liquid-cooled two-cylinder four-stroke in-line engine with a displacement of 1084 cm^{3} produces 65 kW (87 hp) at a speed of 7000 rpm. The maximum torque reaches 98 N⋅m (72 lb⋅ft) at 4750 rpm. The bore is 92 mm, the stroke 81.5 mm; the compression 10.1:1. The crank pins are offset by 90°. An overhead camshaft operates the intake valves via bucket tappets and the exhausts via roller rocker arms.

=== Chassis ===
The 43 mm cartridge fork at the front of the tubular steel frame has an adjustable spring preload. On the swing arm at the rear there are two spring struts with expansion tanks, also with adjustable spring preload. There is a disc brake on each wheel.

=== Transmission ===
The CMX1100 Rebel is available with either a six-speed manual transmission or a six-speed dual-clutch transmission. The latter can shift automatically or the gears can be changed manually using a gear lever on the left of the handlebar.

=== Performance and consumption ===
The top speed of the CMX1100 Rebel is 160 km/h (99 mph).

With a tank capacity of 13.6 liters and an average consumption of 4.9 liters/100 km according to the World Motorcycle Test Cycle (WMTC), this results in a range of approximately 280 kilometers.

== CMX1100 Rebel T ==
The Honda CMX1100 Rebel T differs from the regular HondaCMX 1100 Rebel with additional features and accessories that make it more suitable for touring. The Rebel T is equipped with a more effective windscreen that offers more comfort on longer trips. It also has side panniers with a total of 35 liters of storage space.
