= Honda CB125TD Super Dream =

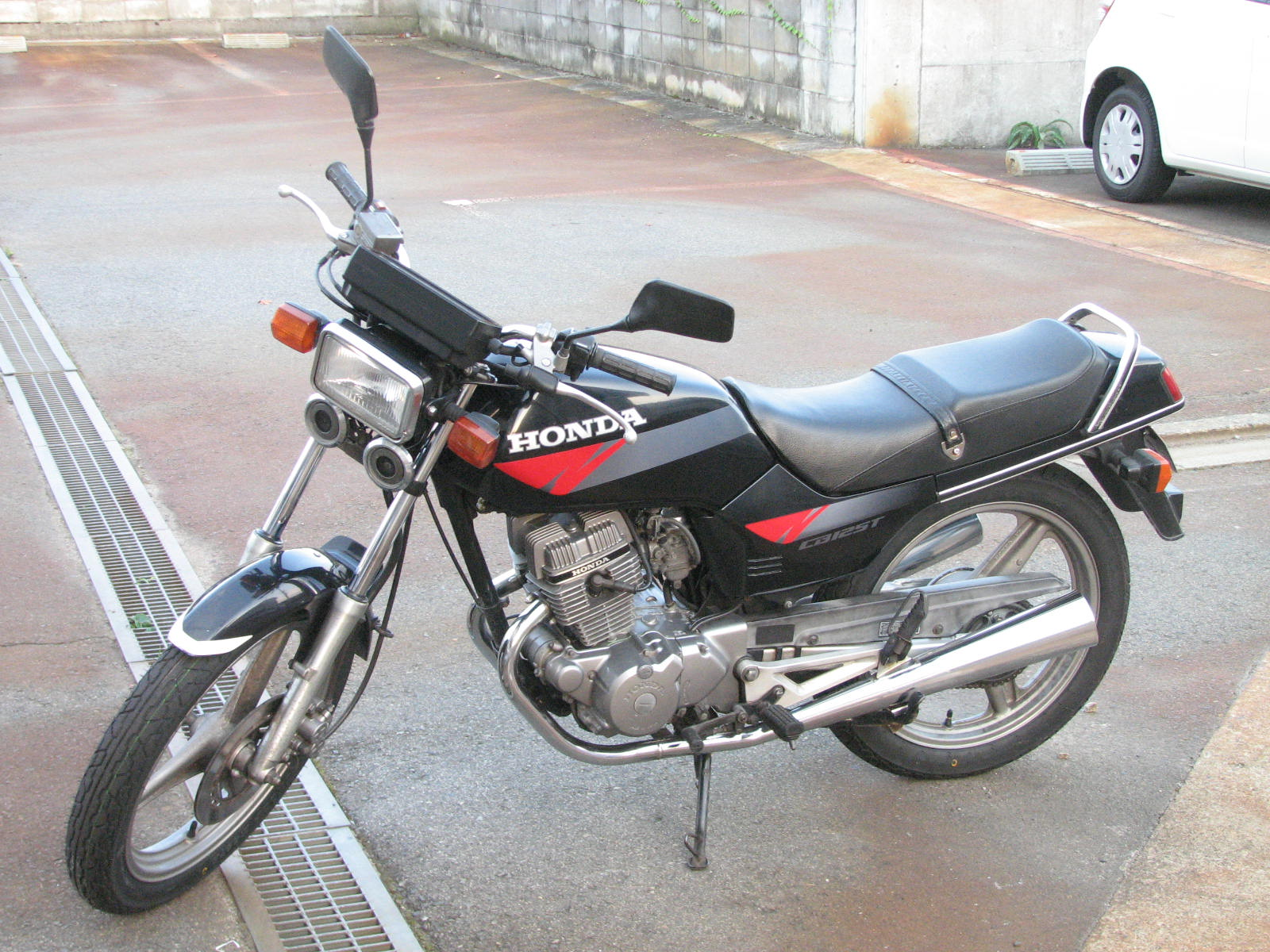
- Honda CB125TD 1982–8
- Manufacturer: Honda Motor Company
- Production: 1982–1988
- Assembly: Japan
- Class: Standard/sport bike
- Engine: 124 cc (7.6 cu in), air-cooled, four stroke, OHC, twin
- Bore / stroke: 44 mm × 41 mm (1.7 in × 1.6 in)
- Top speed: 135kmph
- Power: 12 hp (9 kW)
- Torque: 9.8 Nm
- Ignition type: Capacitor discharge electronic ignition, Electric start
- Transmission: 5-speed manual, chain final drive
- Frame type: Open diamond; tubular and pressed steel; engine as stressed member
- Suspension: Telescopic front; Unit-Pro single shock-absorber rear
- Brakes: Front: disc Rear: drum
- Tyres: Front: 300-18 (tubed); Rear: 325-18 (tubed)
- Wheelbase: 1.35 m (4 ft 5 in)
- Dimensions: L: 2.06 m (6 ft 9 in); W: 0.73 m (2 ft 5 in); H: 1.07 m (3 ft 6 in)
- Seat height: 0.775 m (2 ft 6.5 in)
- Weight: 125kh275 lb (125 kg) (dry); 135kg (wet)
- Fuel capacity: 14 L (3.1 imp gal; 3.7 US gal)
- Fuel consumption: 35-45kmpl
- Related: Honda CD125; Honda CM125

The Honda CB125TD Super Dream is a 124 cc (7.6 cu in) air-cooled, four stroke, twin cylinder motorcycle manufactured by the Honda Motor Company between 1982 and 1988, in three designations, TDC, TDE and TDJ. Intended as a sportier version of the Honda CD125 and CM125 it was similarly restricted to a maximum of 12hp (9.0kW), in compliance with the provisional licence requirements of the time, so that it could be used by novice riders.

The machine was equipped with capacitor discharge electronic ignition, disc front and drum rear brakes and Comstar wheels. It had electric start and both centre and side stands. Electrics were 12-volt, and the battery was housed in a recess in the airbox. A compartment in the tailpiece contained a small toolkit. Instrumentation was by way of a handlebar mounted cluster. This contained a tachometer, warning lights for main beam, ignition/neutral and indicators, and a speedometer in miles per hour, with markings for kilometres, plus an odometer.
