= Suzuki TU250 =

Motorcycle

Suzuki TU250X
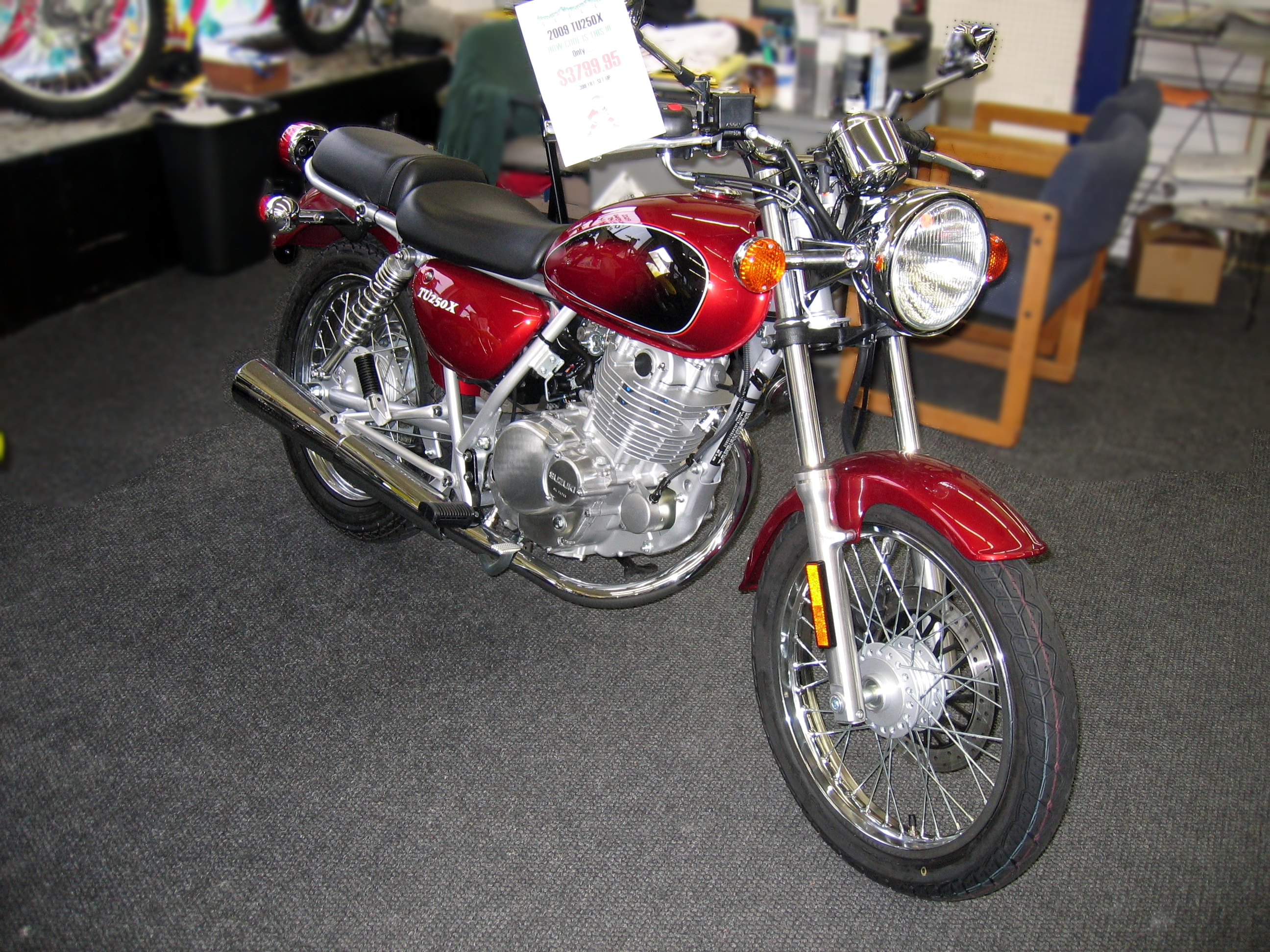
- Manufacturer: Suzuki
- Also called: Suzuki ST250
- Production: 1997–2019
- Predecessor: GN250
- Class: Standard
- Engine: Model J438, 249 cc (15.2 cu in), 4-stroke, 2-valve, single-cylinder, Air-cooled, SOHC, Fuel Injection
- Bore / stroke: 72.0 mm × 61.2 mm (2.83 in × 2.41 in)
- Compression ratio: 9.2:1
- Top speed: 75 mph (121 km/h)
- Power: 20 bhp (15 kW) @ 7200 rpm
- Torque: 12.54 lb⋅ft (17.00 N⋅m) @ 4500 rpm
- Ignition type: Electronic
- Transmission: Wet multi-plate clutch, 5-speed gearbox, constant mesh, O-ring chain
- Frame type: Steel backbone
- Suspension: Front: telescopic, Rear: swingarm
- Brakes: Front: Tokico two-piston caliper single disc, Rear: drum
- Tires: Tube-type: Cheng Shin, Front: 90/90-18M/C 51S, Rear: 110/90-18M/C 61S
- Wheelbase: 1,375 mm (54.1 in.)
- Dimensions: L: 2,070 mm (81 in); W: 750 mm (30 in); H: 1,075 mm (42.3 in)
- Seat height: 770 mm (30 in)
- Weight: 140 kg (310 lb) (dry); 149 kg (328 lb) (wet)
- Fuel capacity: 12 L (3.2 US gal)
- Fuel consumption: 82 mpg_{‑US} (2.9 L/100 km) claimed, 64 mpg_{‑US} (3.7 L/100 km) tested 53 mpg_{‑US} (4.4 L/100 km) tested
- Turning radius: 2.4 meters, 7.9 feet
- Related: TU250 Volty, TU250G Grasstracker, TU250GB Bigboy, GZ250

The Suzuki TU250— marketed also as the TU250X, ST250 and ST250 E-Type — is a single-cylinder, air-cooled lightweight street bike manufactured by Suzuki across two generations from 1994 to 2019.

The TU has a single overhead cam (SOHC), unsleeved, four-stroke engine with chain-drive, a standard riding posture and styling resembling the Universal Japanese Motorcycle (UJM) of the 1960s and 1970s.

The second generation TU250 was manufactured at Suzuki's ISO 14001-certified assembly plant in Toyokawa, Japan, and was marketed in Asia (2003–2019), Oceania, and North America (2009–2019). It was discontinued in the home market in 2017, as new, stricter emissions standards were introduced.

== First generation ==
The first generation TU was introduced to the Japanese domestic market (JDM) in 1994 in both 125cc or 249cc models.

Variations of the bike marketed in the JDM and other regions include the VanVan (Asia, Europe), Grasstracker (TU250G) (Asia), Grasstracker Bigboy (TU250GB) (Asia) and Volty (Asia, Europe).

Confusingly, the first generation TU250, marketed in Asia as the Volty, was marketed in Europe from 1997 to 2003 — also as the TU250X Volty.

== Second generation ==
The second generation TU debuted at the 37th Tokyo Motor Show 2003, described at the time by Suzuki as:

"a street motorcycle with a traditional, simple design, the ST250/ST250 E type is styled to create a feel that's both familiar and nostalgic. Its performance and equipment make it optimally suited for casual, daily rides."

The bike was formally introduced to the Japanese domestic market in December 2003 for model year 2004 as the ST250 and ST250 E-Type, the latter having a higher level of trim, including a two-tone fuel tank, polished engine, chromed exhaust pipe, CDI ignition, and a kick starter as well as electric start. The basic ST250 was discontinued in 2007, leaving only the E-type. The initial model had a carburetted engine with 20 PS (14.7 kW) at 7,500 rpm; this was changed to a fuel injected version with a catalytic converter and one horsepower less in February 2008, to meet new emissions regulations. This also brought with it a change to full transistor ignition, while the kickstarter was removed and the frame paint was changed to silver.

Suzuki Motor of America began marketing the second generation motorcycle in North America for model year 2009 as the TU250X, with a hiatus for model years 2010 and 2014, allowing the manufacturer to adjust importation to demand. The US model has additional emissions equipment and as a result, produces 16 PS (11.8 kW; 15.8 hp). The bike was introduced to Australia in 2011 as the TU250X.

The TU250X had a twin valve, single cylinder engine with a closed-loop Electronic Fuel Injection (EFI) system (marketed as Suzuki Dual Throttle Valve) and a 32-bit ECU, oxygen sensor, catalytic converter, integral cold-start system, 32mm throttle body 10-nozzle injector and a proprietary air injection system (marketed as Suzuki Pulsed-secondary AIR-injection or PAIR) that introduces fresh air from the airbox into the exhaust port to ignite unburned hydrocarbons, reducing emissions. In the United States, the TU does not meet California emissions requirements and has remained a 49-state model.

The air-cooled engine has a gear-driven counterbalancer as well as a proprietary cylinder wall plating similar to a Nikasil coating. The coating, marketed as Suzuki Composite Electro-chemical Material or SCEM, is nickel-phosphorus-silicon-carbide based, reducing weight (by eliminating a steel liner) and improving heat transfer, allowing for tighter and more efficient piston-to-cylinder clearance. Valves are adjustable via 'screw and locknut' type clearance adjusters. The engine features an oil sump sight glass, enabling visual oil checks, and uses 87 octane fuel.

Specifications include a five speed transmission with cable-actuated clutch, electric starting (with kickstarter in the JDM), clutch and side stand interlocks (cut-outs), electronic ignition system, maintenance free battery, tubular steel frame with load bearing (stressed member) engine, rear drum brake and front 275mm dual-piston caliper disk brake by Tokico, chrome-plated locking gas cap, passenger pillion separate from the driver's seat, plastic front and rear fenders, factory equipped tool kit (under the right side panel), helmet lock, tapered chrome muffler, and chrome wired wheels. Cheng Shin tube-type tires are fitted as standard equipment: 90/90-18 front and 110/90-18 rear. Drive is via a 108 link, DID520V chain.

Instrumentation includes an analog speedometer with trip odometer and indicator lights for turn signal, high beam and fuel injection status, as well as a low fuel warning and neutral light.

The bike had a 148 kg (328 lb) curb weight (wet), rake of 25°55', trail of 3.62"; and an unladen weight distribution of 47.4% front, 52.6% rear.

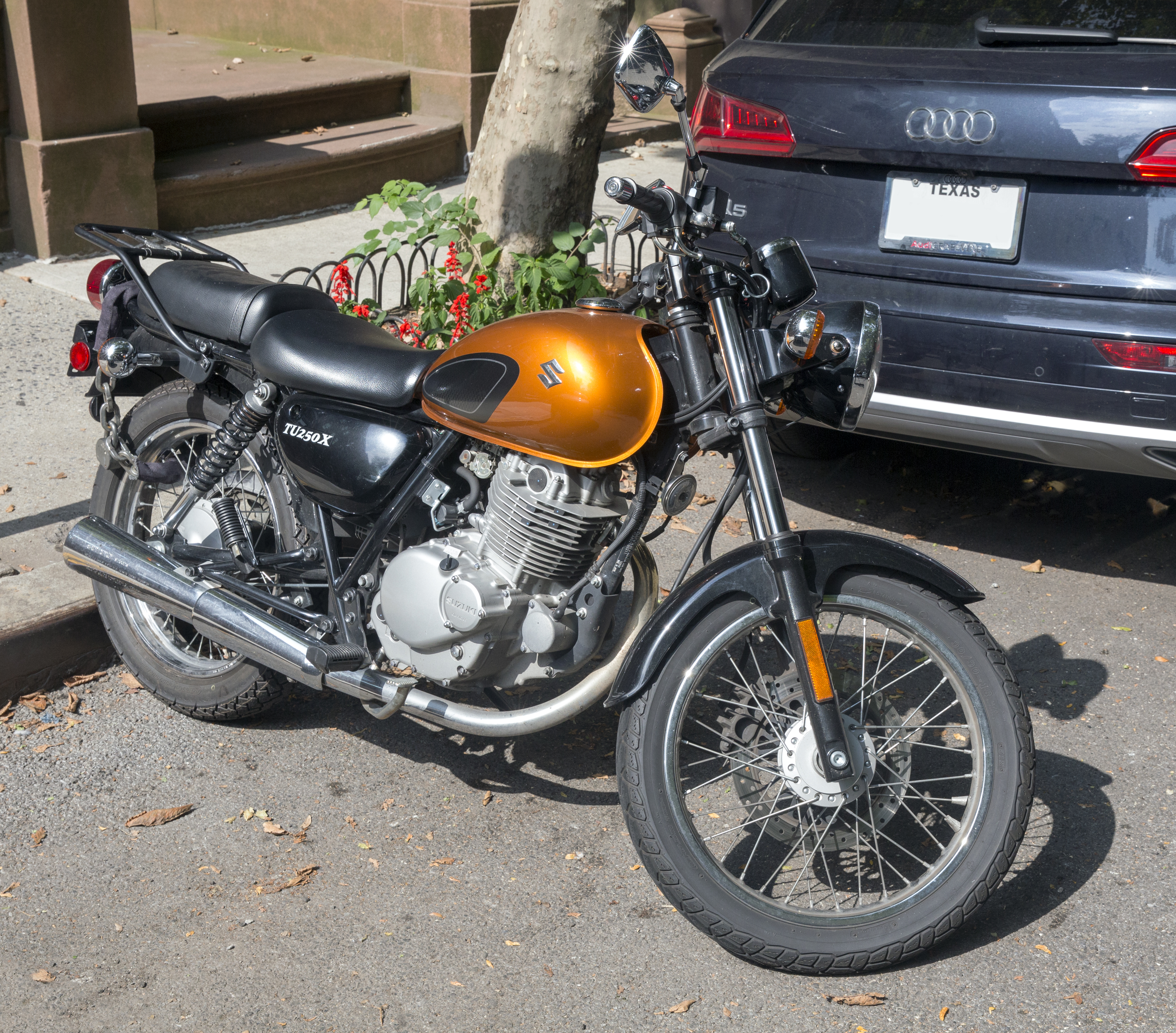
2016 Suzuki TU250X, North American Model

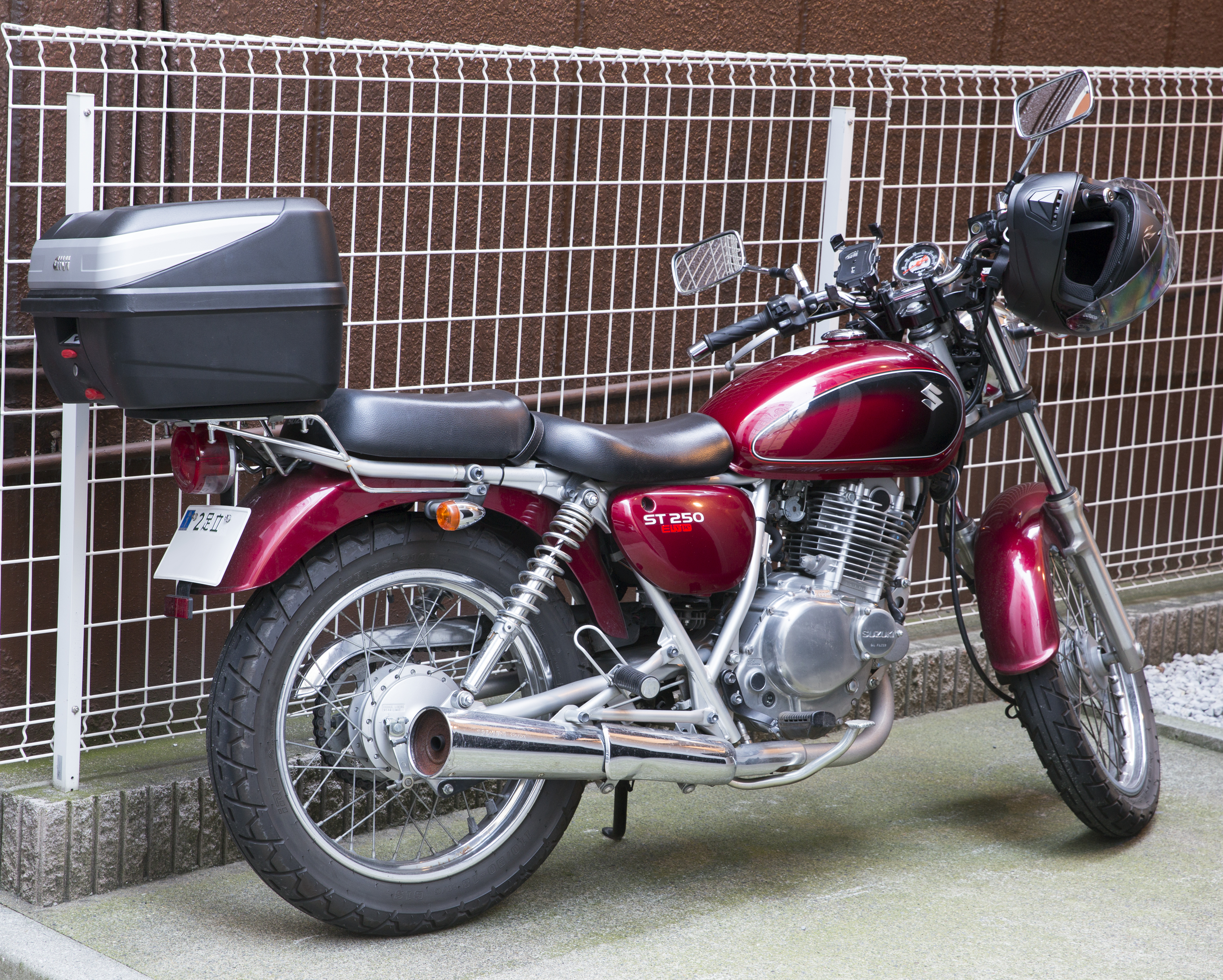
Rear view (Japanese market ST250 E-type)

=== Reception ===
Reviewing the bike for its 2009 U.S. introduction, Scott Rousseau at Motorcycle Consumer News described the bike as having "1960s-era British aesthetics" as well as a "rev-happy thumper motor, light handling and surprisingly competent suspension."

Canadian Moto Guide conducted a long term review of the bike in 2013, saying "The only ongoing niggle with the TU was the rear suspension which is just not that compliant when it comes to dealing with road irregularities."

In late 2014, the TU250X placed fifth in a five bike comparison by Motorcycle.com, against the Yamaha SR400 (Japan-built), Suzuki GW250 (China-built), Royal Enfield Continental GT (India-built), and Honda CB300F (Thailand-built). The reviewer noted the TU's engine developed 14.8 hp @ 7300rpm with 11.5 lb-ft of torque, returning 67mpg. The reviewer said "the elegantly styled retro bike is overwhelmingly competent in many areas. Four of the five testers gave it favorable reviews", adding "it does everything it’s meant to do – turn, brake, accelerate – with unquestionable proficiency. For the novice, especially one who is slight in stature, the TU is simply the best bike on which to learn how to ride a motorcycle."

Describing the TU250X, one commenter wrote that Suzuki had "returned to the simple formula of the UJM, and with it brought back the pleasures of riding a friendly, straightforward motorcycle."
