= Honda CMX450 =

CMX 450 Rebel
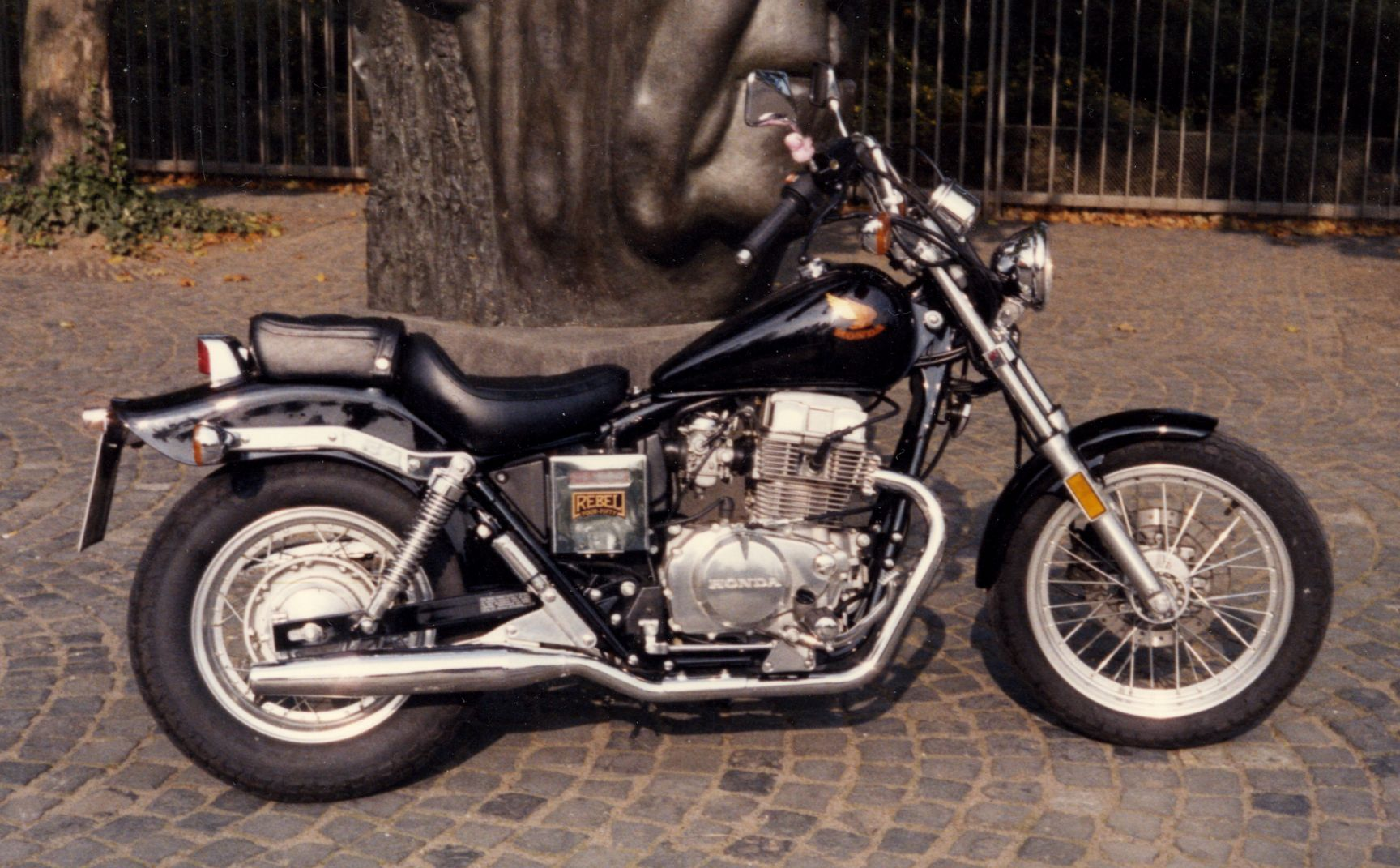
- Manufacturer: Honda
- Production: 1986–1987
- Successor: Honda CMX500
- Class: Cruiser
- Engine: 447 cc (27.3 cu in) SOHC 4-stroke parallel twin
- Transmission: 6-speed, wet multi-plate clutch, chain final drive
- Suspension: Front: telescopic fork Rear: swingarm, shock absorber
- Brakes: Front: single disc, rear: drum
- Tires: Front:100/90-18 56 S, rear: 140/90-15 70S. tubeless
- Rake, trail: 58.0° 135 mm (5.3 in)
- Wheelbase: 1,530 mm (60 in)
- Dimensions: L: 2,230 mm (88 in); W: 800 mm (31 in); H: 1,170 mm (46 in)
- Seat height: 690 mm (27 in)
- Fuel capacity: 12 L (3.2 US gal)
- Oil capacity: 2.5 L (2.6 US qt)
- Related: Rebel 250

The Honda CMX450 "Rebel" is a motorcycle manufactured by Honda for the model years 1986 and 1987 only. In contrast to the Rebel 250 250cc cruiser, it has a 450cc engine. The introduction of the Rebel 250 and 450 has been cited as a way for Honda to attract female riders, new to motorcycling, due to the bikes' low seat heights, low center of gravity, and overall ease of handling. However, the September 1985 issue of Motorcyclist magazine, when the Rebel was first introduced, states "by targeting the bike to a young audience, such as those who watch MTV, Honda hopes to attract newcomers and expand the motorcycle market ... Honda is not marketing this motorcycle as a woman's bike". It has a single disc brake in the front and a drum in the rear. The only gauge is a speedometer that includes gear recommendations based on speed; there is no tachometer. The transmission is a standard down-1st, up-2nd to 6th. The 6th speed acts as an overdrive.
