= Honda CM125 =

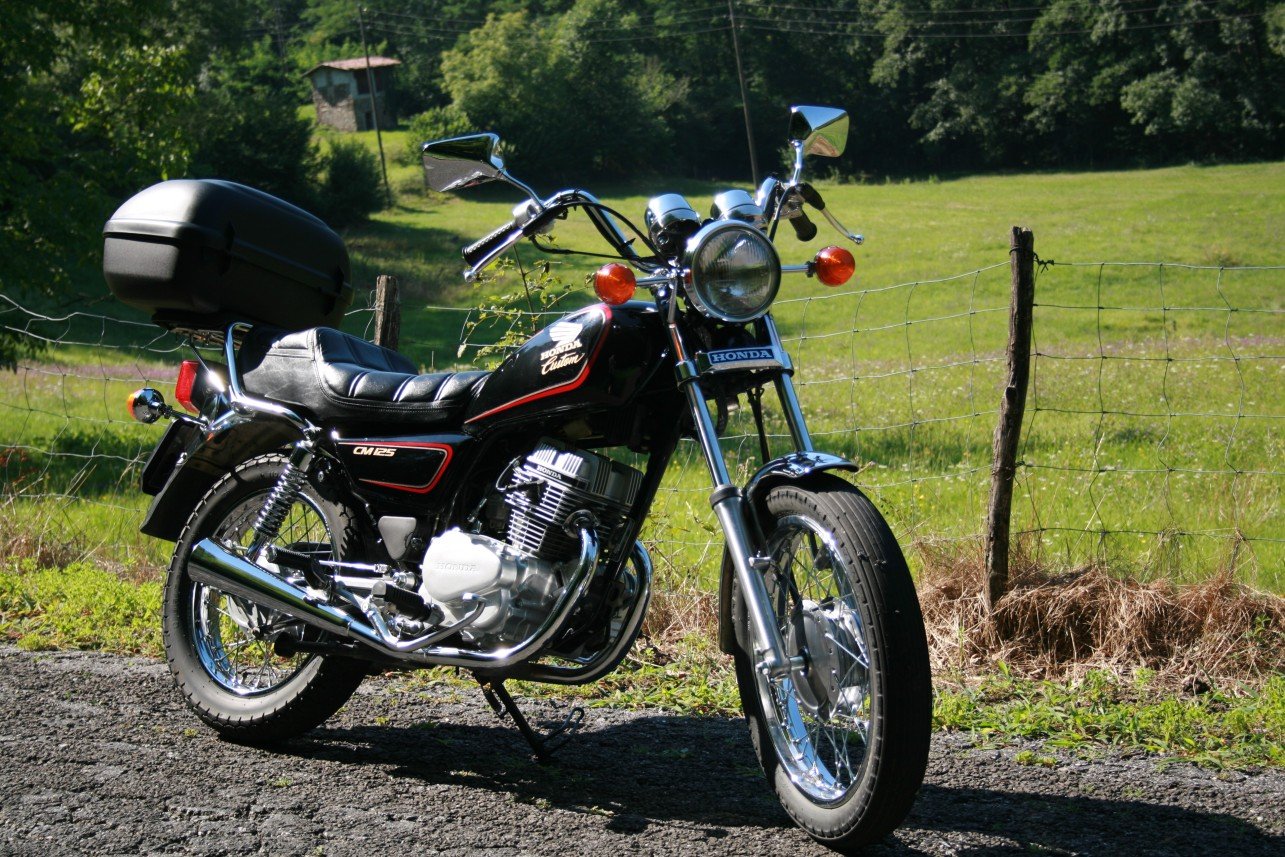
- Manufacturer: Honda Motor Company
- Also called: Honda Custom 125
- Production: 1978–2002
- Successor: Honda CA125 Rebel
- Class: Cruiser
- Engine: 124 cc (7.6 cu in), air-cooled, four-stroke, twin-cylinder
- Transmission: 5-speed manual: chain drive
- Frame type: Open diamond; tubular steel; engine as stressed member
- Suspension: Oil damped twin shock
- Brakes: Drum front and rear
- Wheelbase: 1.280 m (4 ft 2.4 in)
- Weight: 139 kg (306 lb) (dry)
- Fuel capacity: 13 L (2.9 imp gal; 3.4 US gal)
- Related: Honda CD125TC Benly; Honda CB125TD Super Dream; Honda CM200T

The Honda CM125 is a parallel twin cylinder air-cooled OHC four-stroke cruiser motorcycle made by Honda from 1978 to 2002. It had a top speed of 65 mph (105 km/h). The CM125C engine combines the single carburettor of the squat Honda CD125 Benly motor with the tall cylinder head and five-speed, gearbox of the sportier Honda 125 Super Dream.

== Description ==
The design used popular North American cruiser styling and copied features found on larger displacement cruisers and factory custom-styling. The CM125 had high handlebars, megaphone silencers, a teardrop-shaped petrol tank and a stepped seat. More chromium-plated and polished alloy parts were found on this model than on the comparable Superdream and Benly 125 models. The quality of the chrome-plated finish was such that corrosion was a problem. The ignition lock was between the instrumentation, which consisted of two binnacles, one containing a speedometer; the other, a set of three warning lights (neutral, turn, high beam). The ignition key also activated both the steering lock and the lock on the plastic tool box located under the off-side side panel. The drum brakes were actuated by a cable in front and a rod in the rear.

The engine had a duplex camchain rather than the more common inverted-tooth type. Frame numbers started JC05-50 for the 1982-5 CM125CC and JC05-51 for the 1985-6 CM125CF. The appearance of this model, greatly enhanced by its substantial-looking twin cylinder engine, meant it enjoyed particular popularity in the United Kingdom, where learner motorcyclists are by law restricted to machines of 125 cc and below until they pass their riding test and obtain a full licence. The CM125 Custom was deleted from Honda's United Kingdom line-up in 1986. It continued to be manufactured and sold in Europe and Singapore as the CM125CN (1992, frame numbers (JC05) 5500023–5505185), CM125CP (1993, frame numbers (JC05) 5600001–5608387), CM125CR (1994–1998, frame numbers (JC05) 5700001–5999999) and CM125CX (1999, frame numbers (JH2JC05A*/JH2JC05B*) XK000001-XK099999). Its continuing popularity eventually led to another 125cc custom model being introduced, the Honda CA125 Rebel.
