= Honda CMX500 Rebel =

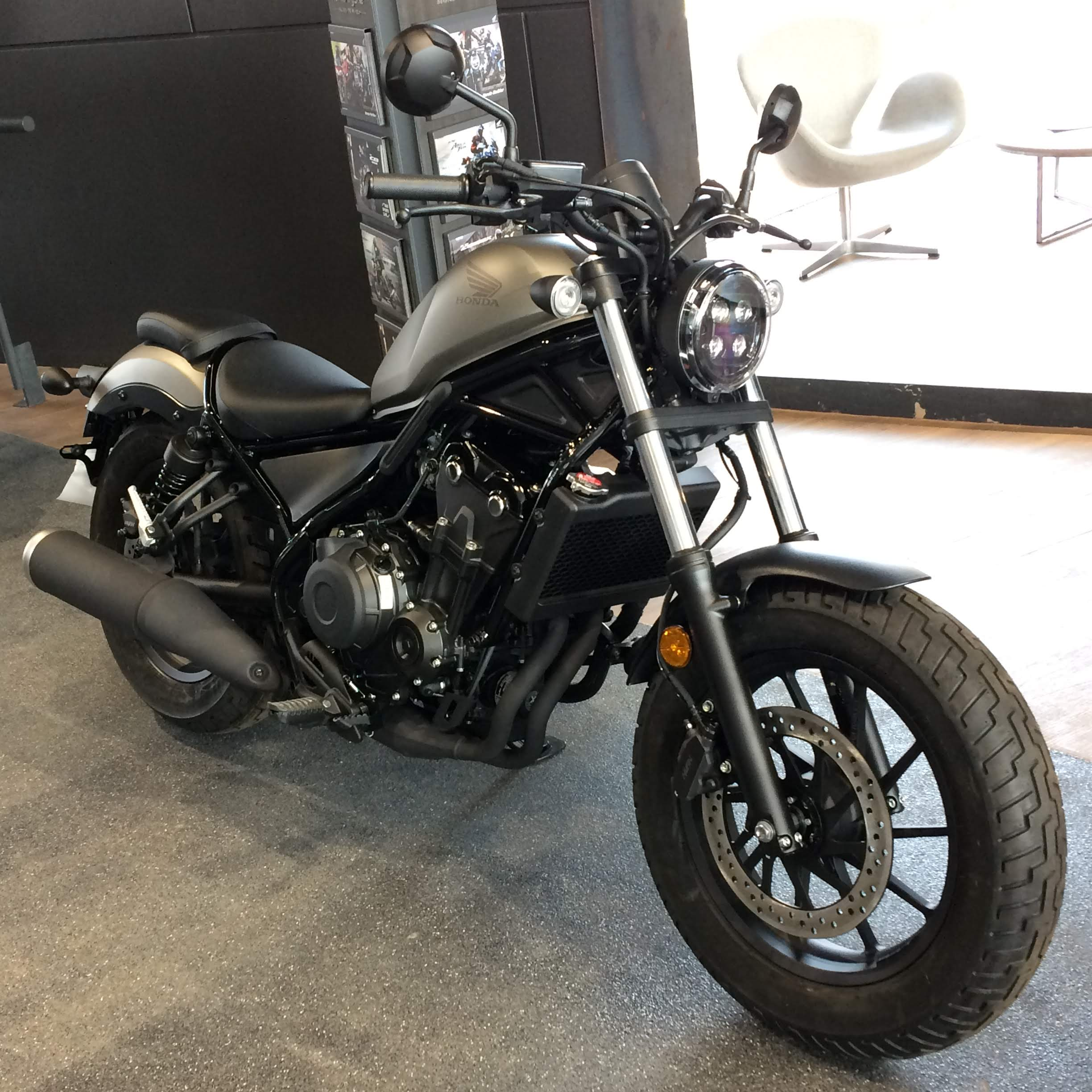
- 2020 Honda CMX500 Rebel
- Manufacturer: Honda
- Also called: Honda CMX500; Honda Rebel 500
- Production: 2017–present
- Assembly: Japan: Kumamoto Factory, Ozu (Honda Motorcycles); India: Manesar (HMSI)
- Predecessor: Honda CMX450
- Class: Cruiser
- Engine: 471 cc (28.7 cu in) liquid-cooled 4-stroke 8-valve DOHC Straight-twin engine
- Bore / stroke: 67.0 mm × 66.8 mm (2.64 in × 2.63 in)
- Compression ratio: 10.7:1
- Power: 34 kW (46 hp) at 8,500 rpm^{[claimed]}
- Torque: 43.2 N⋅m (32 lb⋅ft) at 6,000 rpm^{[claimed]}
- Transmission: 6-speed manual
- Suspension: Front: 41 mm telescopic fork Rear: Dual shocks, 96 mm travel
- Tires: Front: 130/90-16; Rear: 150/80-16
- Wheelbase: 1,490 mm (58.7 in)
- Dimensions: L: 2,205 mm (86.8 in); W: 820 mm (32 in); H: 1,090 mm (43 in)
- Seat height: 690 mm (27 in)
- Weight: 191 kg (421 lb)^{[claimed]} (wet)

The Honda CMX500 Rebel (also called the Honda CMX500 or Rebel 500) is a cruiser motorcycle made by the Japanese company Honda.

Designed as a "bobber-style" cruiser within the Honda CM series, the model was presented in November 2016 in Long Beach, California, and went into production in spring 2017. The 2020 model included a new LED lighting package, a revised instrument cluster, and a slipper-assist clutch. The Rebel 500 uses the same 471 cc (28.7 cu in) 180° crank straight-twin engine as Honda's other 21st century "500 twins", and shares some frame components with the CL500.

== Development ==
The development of the Rebel was described by Astra Honda Motor President Toshiyuki Inuma as "simple" and "raw." The design incorporates "modern lines with stylistic elements reminiscent of the 20th century". According to Honda, the focus was on enabling modification and customization, with an emphasis on minimalism to make customization more accessible and to allow for greater individual expression.

Honda's chief designer, Keita Mikura, described the concept behind the motorcycle as aiming to blend a timeless visual appearance with contemporary elements; the design goal was to create a motorcycle that is straightforward and practical, while also being adaptable to various uses as desired by the owner.

== See also ==
- Honda CMX450, also called the Honda Rebel
- Honda 500 twins
