= Suzuki GN series =

Series of motorcycles

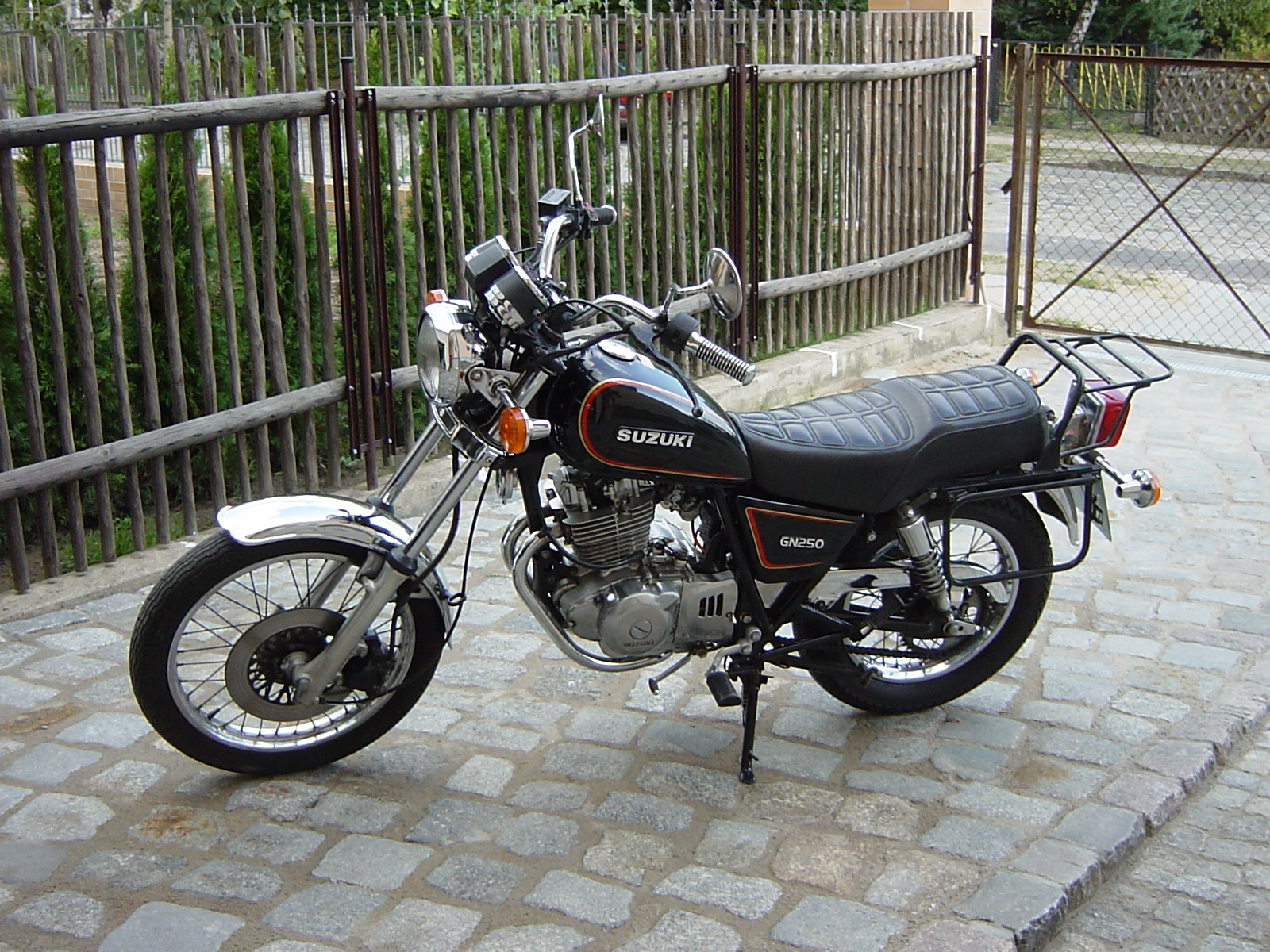
Suzuki GN250

The GN is a series of standard motorcycles built by Suzuki since the early '80s.

== Model overview ==
The series included:

- Suzuki GN50E 1981
- Suzuki GN125
- Suzuki GN250
  - Suzuki SW-1
- Suzuki GN400
  - Suzuki GN 400 E 1980
  - Suzuki GN 400 E 1981
  - Suzuki GN 400 E 1982
- Suzuki GN600
  - Suzuki GN600T

All featured air-cooled SOHC single-cylinder engines with chain drive and were designed to be easy to ride by beginners. Early GN250s featured a front drum brake which was touchy in cold or wet weather. The drum was replaced by a disk after one year. Instrumentation included a speedometer, odometer with trip, high beam and turn indicator, and a gear position indicator.

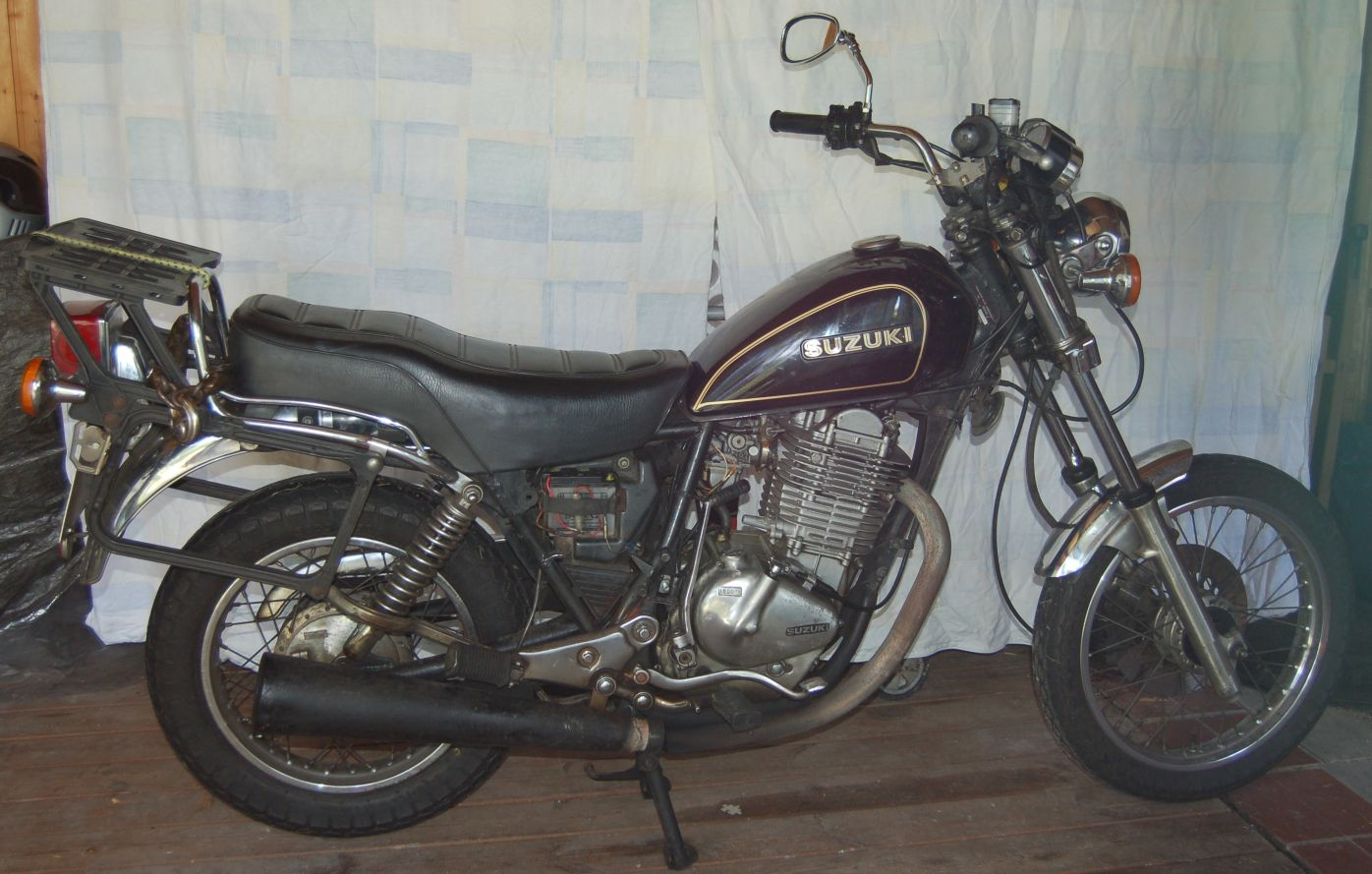
Suzuki GN400

The GN400 was based on the SP400 Enduro motorcycle and was also available as the GN400X, which substituted spoke wheels for the GN400's alloy wheels, as well as having a flatter seat and flatter, shorter handlebars. Neither GN400 had an electric starter. The GN400 instrumentation added a tachometer to the above-mentioned gear. A manual decompression system was fitted.

The GN600T (Road Sports) was based on the Suzuki DR600.

The new (2009 model year) Suzuki TU250X is based on predecessor models known as the Volty and the Grasstracker, which were heavily based on the GN250. The TU250X features a cleaner-burning fuel-injected 249cc single-cylinder as well as styling resembling the British sporting single of the 1960s as well as the Universal Japanese Motorcycle.

The city-street–oriented TU250 Volty featured a 17-horsepower 249cc 2-valve single-cylinder carbureted engine. The Suzuki TU250G Grasstracker and Suzuki TU250GB Grasstracker Bigboy were multi-purpose bikes with a kickstart version of the engine.

The 2007 GZ250 features the same basic powertrain as the GN250, but with a more cruiser-oriented theme.

Specifications for the 2006 GN 250E

- Overall length: 2,040 mm (80.3 in)
- Overall width: 835 mm (32.9 in)
- Overall height: 1,135 mm (44.1 in)
- Wheelbase: 1,360 mm (53.5 in)
- Ground clearance: 160 mm (6.3 in)
- Dry weight: 129 kg (283 lbs)
- Engine type: air-cooled 249 cc single-cylinder SOHC, 4 valves. 22 hp (16 kW)@ 8,500 rpm, 14.5 lb-ft (2.0 kg-m)@ 5,500 rpm.

Results for US spec 1988 GN 250, from November 1988 Cycle World

- List price: $1859
- Dry weight 294 Lbs
- Seat height 29.0"
- Wheelbase: 53.9"
- Top speed: 79 mph
- 1/4 mile acceleration: 16.82 @ 74.07 mph
- 40-60 mph roll-on: 8.0 seconds

Results for US spec 1980 GN 400, from October 1980 Cycle World

- List price: $1499
- Wet weight 327 Lbs
- Seat height 29.3"
- Wheelbase: 55.2"
- Top speed: 170kmh;mph
- 1/4 mile acceleration: 15.27 @ 82.11 mph
- 40-60 mph roll-on: 6.6 seconds
- Fuel economy: 71.2 mpg
- Range (to reserve): 190.5 miles

Handling and comfort are the main advantages of GN series. It is meant for mainly commuters and especially the GN125 is popular with regard to low fuel consumption.
