= Suzuki GZ series =

Motorcycle series

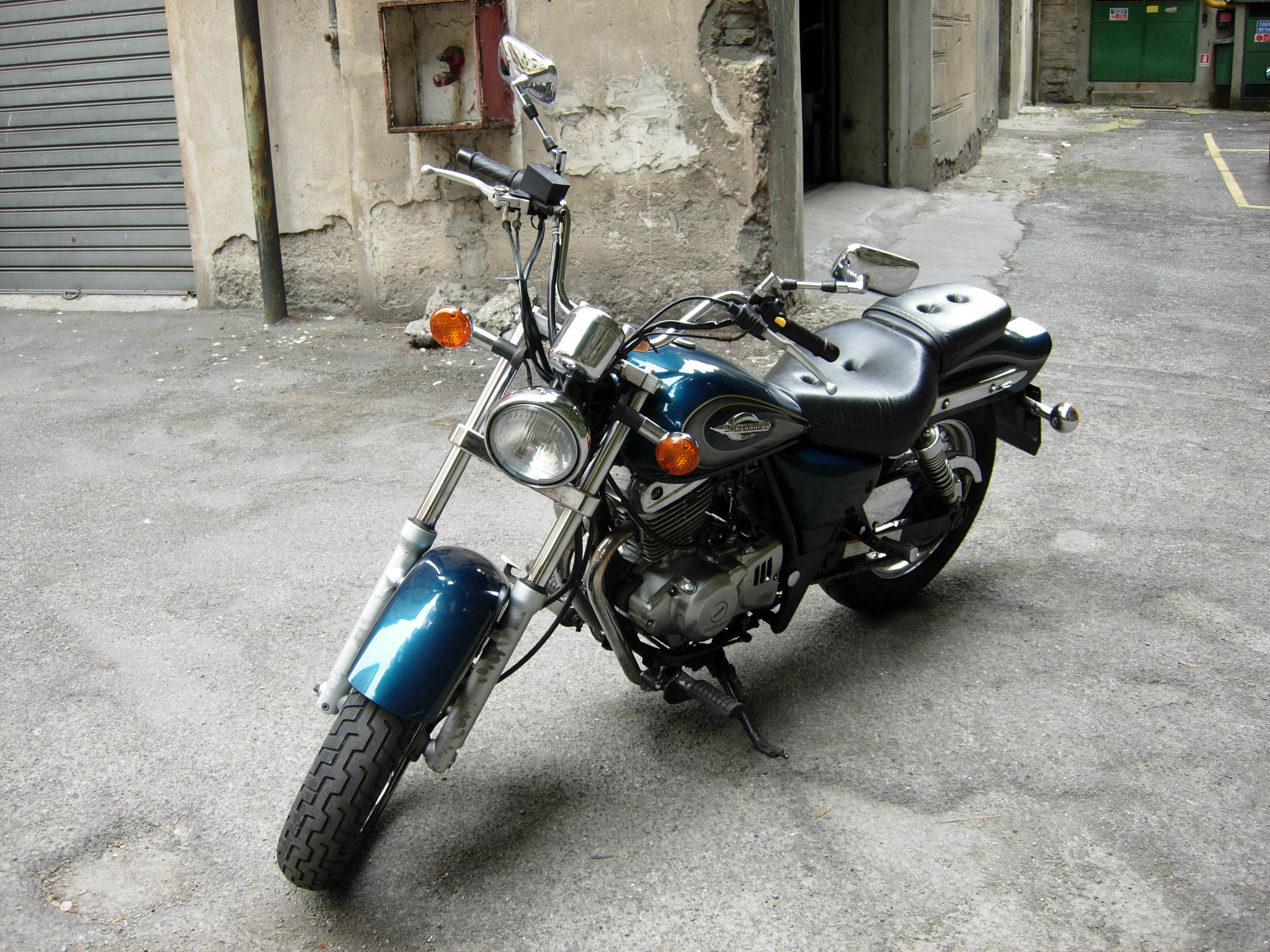
Suzuki GZ250 Marauder

The GZ series is a series of cruiser style motorcycles built by Suzuki since 1998.

They include:

- Suzuki GZ125 Marauder
- Suzuki GZ150
- Suzuki GZ250
- Suzuki GZ250 Marauder

The GZ series is based primarily on the GN series, and features air-cooled SOHC single-cylinder engines with chain drive. Like the GN series these bikes were designed to be easy to ride by beginners. Instrumentation includes a speedometer, odometer with trip, high beam and turn indicator, and a gear position indicator.

== Specifications ==
Specifications for the 2009 GZ125

- Engine: 125 cc (7.6 cu. in), 4-stroke, air-cooled, SOHC, carbureted
- Bore x stroke: 57.0 mm (2.244 in) x 48.8 mm (1.921 in)
- Horsepower: 9.86 hp @ 9000 rpm
- Compression ratio: 9.5 : 1
- Transmission: 5-speed constant mesh
- Final drive: chain
- Overall length: 2160 mm (85.0 in)
- Overall width: 815 mm (32.1 in)
- Overall height: 1090 mm (42.9 in)
- Seat height: 680 mm (27.8 in)
- Ground clearance: 125 mm ( 4.9 in)
- Wheelbase: 1450 mm (57.1 in)
- Curb weight: 140 kg (309 lb)
- Brakes: front disc, rear drum
- Fuel tank capacity: 15.9 L (4.2/3.5 US/Imp gal)

Specifications for the 2012 GZ150

- Engine: 149.5 cc (9.12 cu. in), 4-stroke, air-cooled, SOHC, Fuel Injected
- Bore x stroke: 57.0 mm (2.835 in) x 58.6 mm (?in)
- Horsepower: 15.42 hp @ 8,000 rpm (11.5kW)
- Compression ratio: 9.2 : 1
- Transmission: 5-speed constant mesh
- Final drive: chain
- Overall length: 2250 mm (? in)
- Overall width: 900 mm ( ? in)
- Overall height: 1160 mm (? in)
- Seat height: 710 mm (? in)
- Ground clearance: 150 mm ( ? in)
- Wheelbase: 1450 mm (? in)
- Curb weight: 135 kg (? lb)
- Brakes: front disc, rear drum
- Fuel tank capacity: 11.5 L (3.0/2.5 US/Imp gal)

Specifications for the 2009 GZ250

- Engine: 249 cc (15.2 cu. in), 4-stroke, air-cooled, SOHC, carbureted
- Bore x stroke: 72.0 mm (2.835 in) x 61.2 mm (2.409 in)
- Horsepower: 19.72 hp @ 8,000 rpm
- Compression ratio: 9.0 : 1
- Transmission: 5-speed constant mesh
- Final drive: chain
- Overall length: 2160 mm (85.0 in)
- Overall width: 815 mm (32.1 in)
- Overall height: 1090 mm (42.9 in)
- Seat height: 680 mm (27.8 in)
- Ground clearance: 125 mm ( 4.9 in)
- Wheelbase: 1450 mm (57.1 in)
- Curb weight: 150 kg (331 lb)
- Brakes: front disc, rear drum
- Fuel tank capacity: 13.0 L (3.4/2.9 US/Imp gal)
