= Honda CD200 RoadMaster =

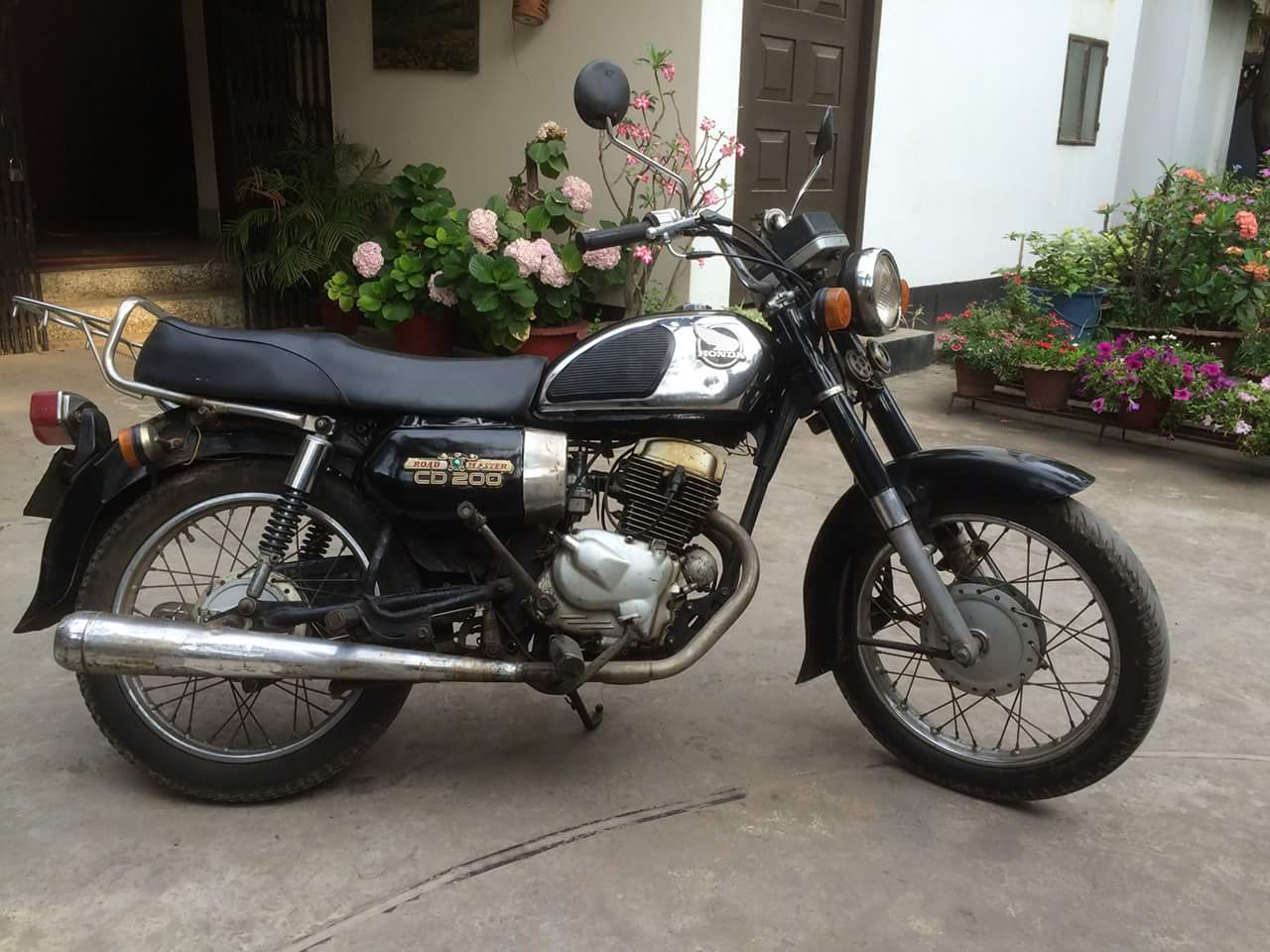
- Honda Roadmaster CD200 1980 Model
- Manufacturer: Honda
- Also called: Honda Twinstar (USA)
- Production: 1980–2007
- Predecessor: Honda CD185
- Successor: Honda CD200 Benly
- Class: Standard
- Engine: 194 cc (11.8 cu in) air-cooled 4-stroke OHC upright twin
- Bore / stroke: 53.0 mm × 44.0 mm (2.09 in × 1.73 in)
- Compression ratio: 8.8:1
- Ignition type: 6 V, coil with contact breaker points (1979-1980); 12 V, capacitor discharge ignition (CDI) (1981-1985)
- Transmission: 4-speed manual, constant mesh (1 down 3 up)
- Frame type: Open-diamond; tubular steel; engine as stressed member
- Suspension: Front: telescopic forks with oil damping; Rear: swingarm with twin spring/shock units
- Brakes: SLS drums: Front: 140 mm (5.5 in); Rear:130 mm (5.1 in)
- Tires: 3.00 × 17 front and rear
- Wheelbase: 1,280 mm (50 in)
- Dimensions: L: 1,990 mm (78 in); W: 845 mm (33.3 in); H: 1,105 mm (43.5 in)
- Seat height: 744 mm (29.3 in)
- Weight: 122 kg (269 lb) (dry)
- Fuel capacity: 10.5 L (2.3 imp gal; 2.8 US gal)
- Oil capacity: 1.5 L (2.6 imp pt; 3.2 US pt)
- Related: Honda CM 200T; Honda CD125TC Benly

Honda introduced several 200cc motorcycles with similar engines but different body variations in the 1980s. The model introduced in South Africa and Pakistan was known as the CD200 RoadMaster. The engine had the same bore as the CD185 but low compression pistons (8.8:1) with a bore and stroke of 53.0 mm × 44.0 mm (2.09 in × 1.73 in), compared to 9.0:1 compression and 53.0 mm × 41.0 mm (2.09 in × 1.61 in) for the CD185. The result was less power, higher fuel economy and a lower top speed. The alternator system was also different from the CD185. Apart from this the models were quite similar, using the same frames, suspension, wheels, tyres, and brakes.

The CD200 featured a square speedometer, large front and rear mudguards, twin chrome exhausts, a choke tucked in behind the handle bars, a chrome plated fuel tank with the Honda logo and mock chrome air inlets on side panels. It had drum brakes in rear and front and a single 26 mm Keihin carburettor (PD 33A TA). It weighed 140 kg (310 lb).

== Other variations ==
- Honda CD200 Benly – introduced in UK featuring 12 volt electrical system and capacitor discharge ignition (CDI)
- Honda CM200 (Custom) – introduced in UK, European, and North American markets
- The CM200T (also known as the Twinstar) was a twin cylinder motorcycle produced by Honda from 1980 to 1982 as part of its factory "Custom Motorcycle" lineup. The CM200's design was based on the CD200 Benly/Roadmaster, using the same engine, transmission, frame, and brakes. It had a speedometer that read up to 80 mph (130 km/h), with markings indicating the maximum speed for each gear ratio. Another instrument panel had lights for neutral, indicators and high beam, but no tachometer was provided.

Power was around 16 bhp, which gave the CM200T a top speed of around 71 mph (114 km/h), although a popular modification was to change the front gearbox sprocket from 15 to 16 teeth which increased top speed to around 75 mph (121 km/h) given good conditions, and could comfortably cruise at 60 mph (97 km/h).
The Twinstar used an odd combination of tire sizes (3.00-17 front and 3.50-16 rear) which can make branded replacement tires expensive, although Chinese tires are still available at reasonable prices.
