= Honda CB125R =

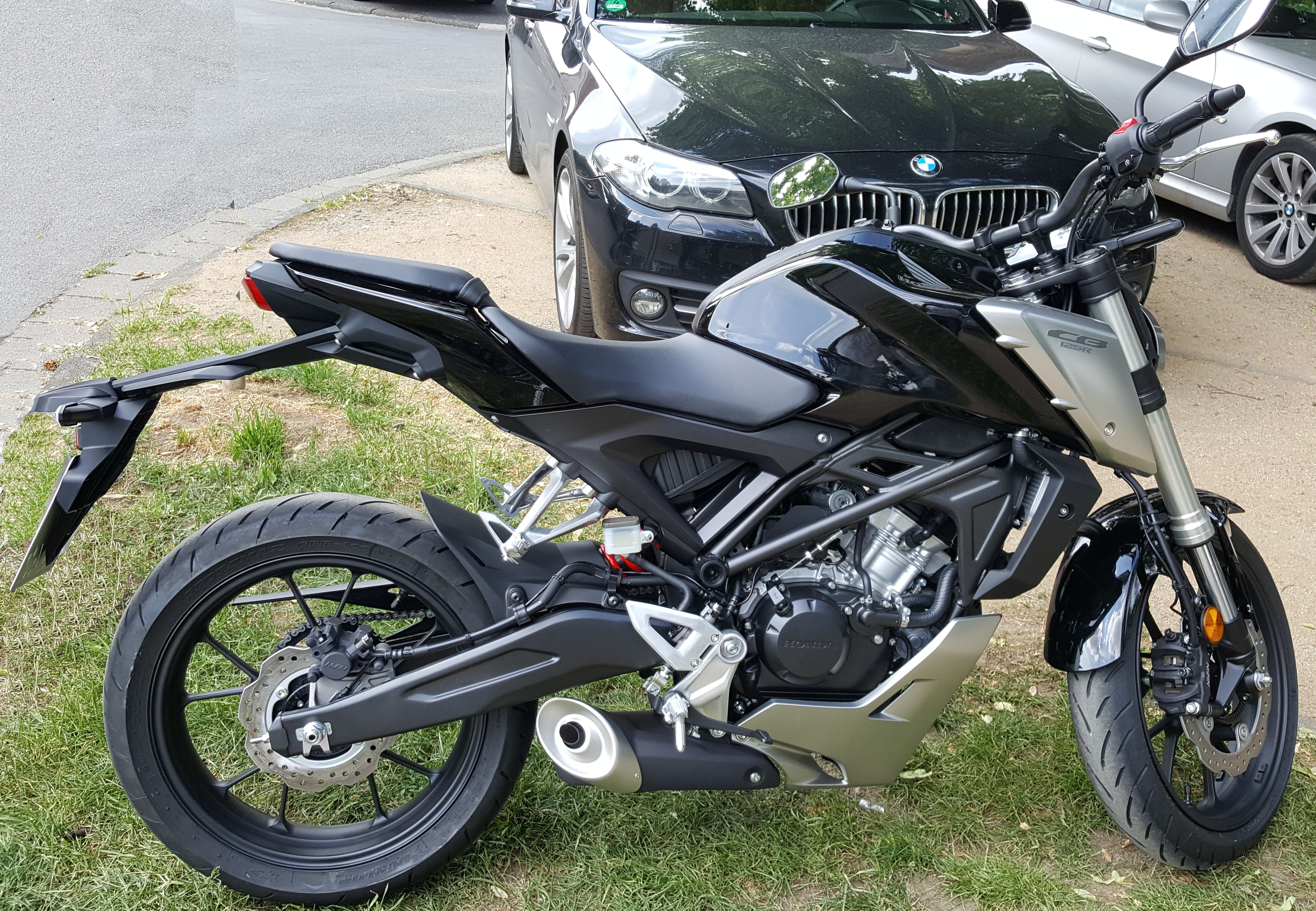
- Manufacturer: Honda
- Production: 2018-present
- Class: Standard
- Bore / stroke: 57.3 mm × 48.4 mm (2.26 in × 1.91 in)
- Compression ratio: 11.3:1
- Power: 11 kW (15 hp) at 10,000 rpm
- Torque: 11.6 N⋅m (9 lb⋅ft) at 8,000 rpm
- Transmission: 6-speed constant mesh
- Frame type: Inner Pivot Diamond Frame
- Suspension: 41mm telescopic inverted fork
- Wheelbase: 1,345 mm (53.0 in)
- Dimensions: L: 2,015 mm (79.3 in); W: 820 mm (32 in); H: 1,055 mm (41.5 in)
- Seat height: 816 mm (32.1 in)
- Weight: 130 kg (290 lb) (wet)
- Fuel capacity: 10.1 L (2.2 imp gal; 2.7 US gal)
- Related: Honda CB1000R; Honda CB650R; Honda CB300R

The Honda CB125R is a light motorcycle introduced in 2018 by Japanese manufacturer Honda. A 125 cc (7.6 cu in) naked bike with a power output of 11 kW (15 hp); it can be ridden on a European A1 license.

The CB125R is a member of Honda's Neo Sports Café model family, which also includes the CB1000R, CB650R, CB300R and the new variant of the CB150R.

== Specifications ==
=== MY 2021- ===
For 2021, Honda unveiled a revised CB125R with a new 11kW (14.75bhp) 4-valve Euro 5 compliant motor. The new motor produces a 11.6Nm peak torque. Up front, the 2021 CB125R has 41mm Showa Separate Function Big Piston (SFF-BP) USD fork. The 2021 model is slightly heavier, at 129.8kg (286 lbs) .

=== MY 2018-2020 ===
Many features have been adopted by other larger-displacement Honda models. However, the CB125R weighs less at 125.8kg (277.3 lbs). The revised Honda CBR125R with a liquid-cooled single-cylinder engine, is advertised to be smoother, with a more powerful acceleration. Its power is brought to the rear wheel via a 6-speed gearbox. The Honda CB125R produces 13.1bhp of maximum power at 10,000rpm and 10Nm of peak torque at 8,000rpm. It comes with a 296mm disc brake at the front wheel and a 220mm disc brake at the rear wheel. The CB125R is equipped with dual-channel ABS based on a inertial measurement unit.

The frame is equipped with steel panels for swinging and the chassis geometry advertises high stability while having agile handling. The steering head angle and the caster are 24.2° and 90.2mm. The balanced load distribution allows feedback from the front wheel and "improved" steering behavior. The bike is weighed at 126kg. Due to the arrangement of the components being centered, the center of gravity is ahead compared to other bikes.
