= Honda CB1100R =

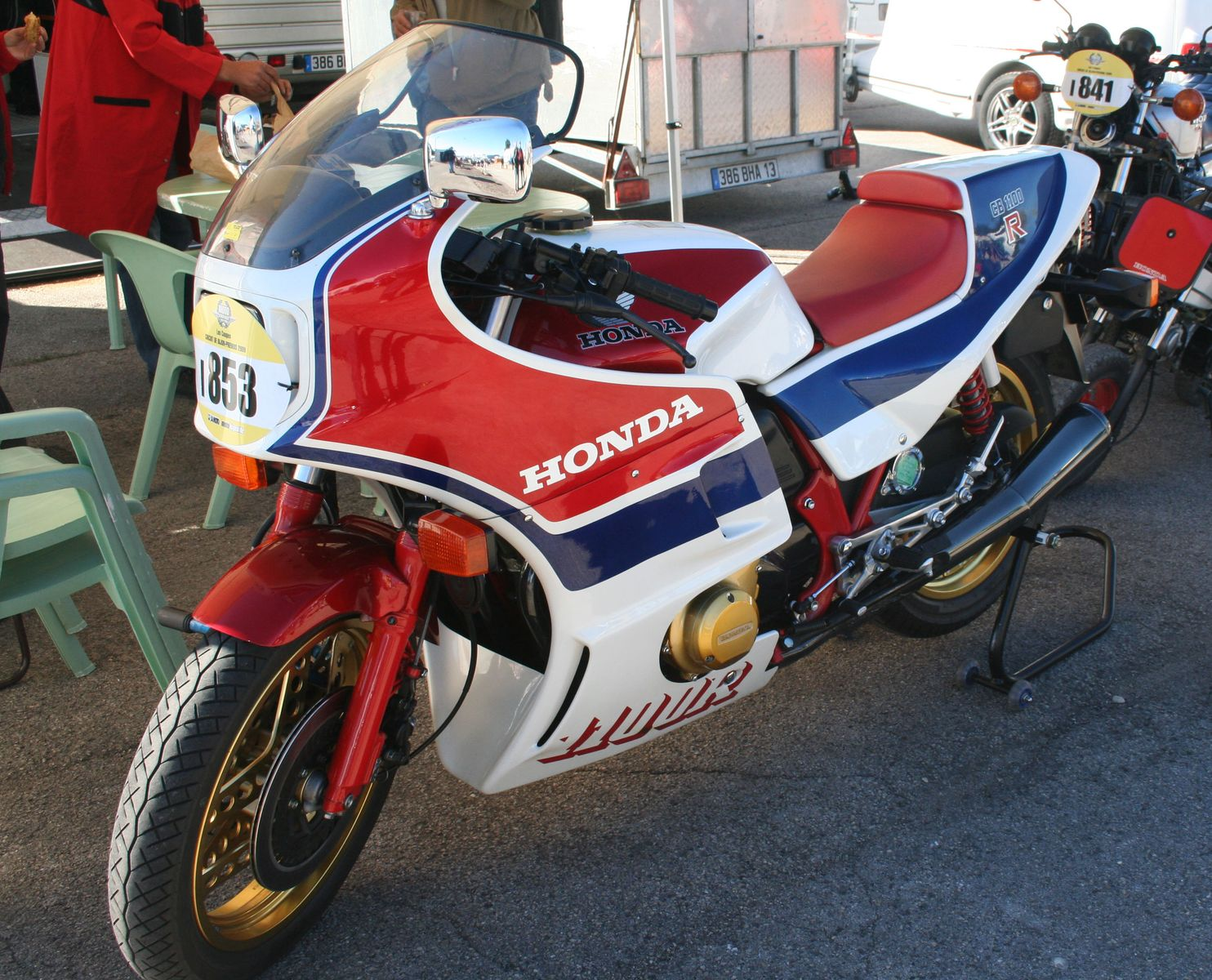
- Honda CB1100RD
- Manufacturer: Honda
- Production: 1980-1983
- Predecessor: Honda CB900F
- Successor: Honda VF1000R
- Class: Sport bike
- Engine: 1,062 cc (64.8 cu in) air cooled inline 4, 4 stroke, DOHC, 16 valves
- Bore / stroke: 70 mm × 69 mm (2.8 in × 2.7 in)
- Compression ratio: 10.0:1
- Top speed: 229 km/h (142 mph)
- Power: 115 bhp (86 kW) @ 9000 rpm
- Torque: 97 N⋅m (72 lbf⋅ft) @ 8000 rpm
- Ignition type: Electronic
- Transmission: 5 speed
- Frame type: Tubular steel twin downtube
- Brakes: Front: double 296 mm (11.7 in) disc Rear:single 296 mm (11.7 in)
- Tires: Front: 100/90V18; Rear 130/80V18
- Wheelbase: 1,490 mm (59 in)
- Dimensions: W: 805 mm (31.7 in)
- Weight: 235 kg (518 lb) (dry)
- Fuel capacity: 26 L (5.7 imp gal; 6.9 US gal)
- Related: Honda CB1100F, Honda CB900F

The Honda CB1100R was an exotic Honda model that was produced in limited numbers from 1980 to 1983. It was a single-seat sport bike based on the Honda CB900F, initially with a 3/4 fairing and exposed lower engine. The R suffix denotes a racing version, however the CB1100R was a road-legal machine produced by Honda and offered for sale to the public. It was produced only in numbers sufficient to meet the homologation requirements for the R to be classed as a production motorcycle in markets into which it was sold. It was Honda's first 'homologation special' and was raced in the production class racing in most major markets: including Europe, South Africa, Australia and New Zealand. It was not sold in the US.

In 1980, the first batch of 110 naked versions were rushed to Australia specifically with the aim of winning the world renowned Castrol 6 Hour race. The Honda did indeed win with future world champion Wayne Gardner and Australian champion Andrew Johnson riding. The organisers of the event then prevented the single seat Honda from entering the 1981 Castrol 6 Hour as they deemed it a "race special". In 1981, the CB1100R won the New Zealand Castrol Six Hour ridden by Australian pair of Malcolm Campbell and Mick Cole. The CB1100R was slightly modified to have a dual seat so as to reclassify it as a road bike, so allowing it to enter the 1982 Castrol 6 Hour, and duly won this premier Australian production race in 1982, the Castrol Six Hour in the hands of future 1987 500cc GP World Champion Wayne Gardner and teammate Wayne Clark. Other CB1100Rs finished the race 2nd, 3rd and 4th, with 6 CB11000Rs finishing in the top 8 spots. The Australasian success of the CB1100R lead directly to the development of the Suzuki GSX1100SXZ Katana homologation racing specials.

The model designations are CB1100RB (1980 and 1981), CB1100RC (1982), and CB1100RD (1983). In 1980/81, 1050 units were sold, followed by 1500 per year in 1982 and 1983. The 1981 'RB' was half faired with a solo seat only. The 82 and 83 models have different bodywork including a full fairing, aluminium fuel tank, and pillion seat covered with a removable seat cowl. The 82 (RC) and 83 (RD) were largely similar in appearance, yet with considerable differences what concerns the full fairing and dashboard layout. None of the fairing parts of any of the 3 models are interchangeable with one another. The RC fairing, fairing bracket and dashboard combo was only made for the RC and does not interchange in any way with the RD, which had a slightly shorter overall length. Other differences include the paint scheme, rear swing arm design and color and front fork design. In 1983 the Honda CB1100F was launched that essentially was a blend of the CB1100R and the CB900F, for a broader market. The 1981 CB1100RB had a claimed 115 hp (86 kW) @ 9000 rpm.
