= Honda CB900F Hornet =

Motorcycle

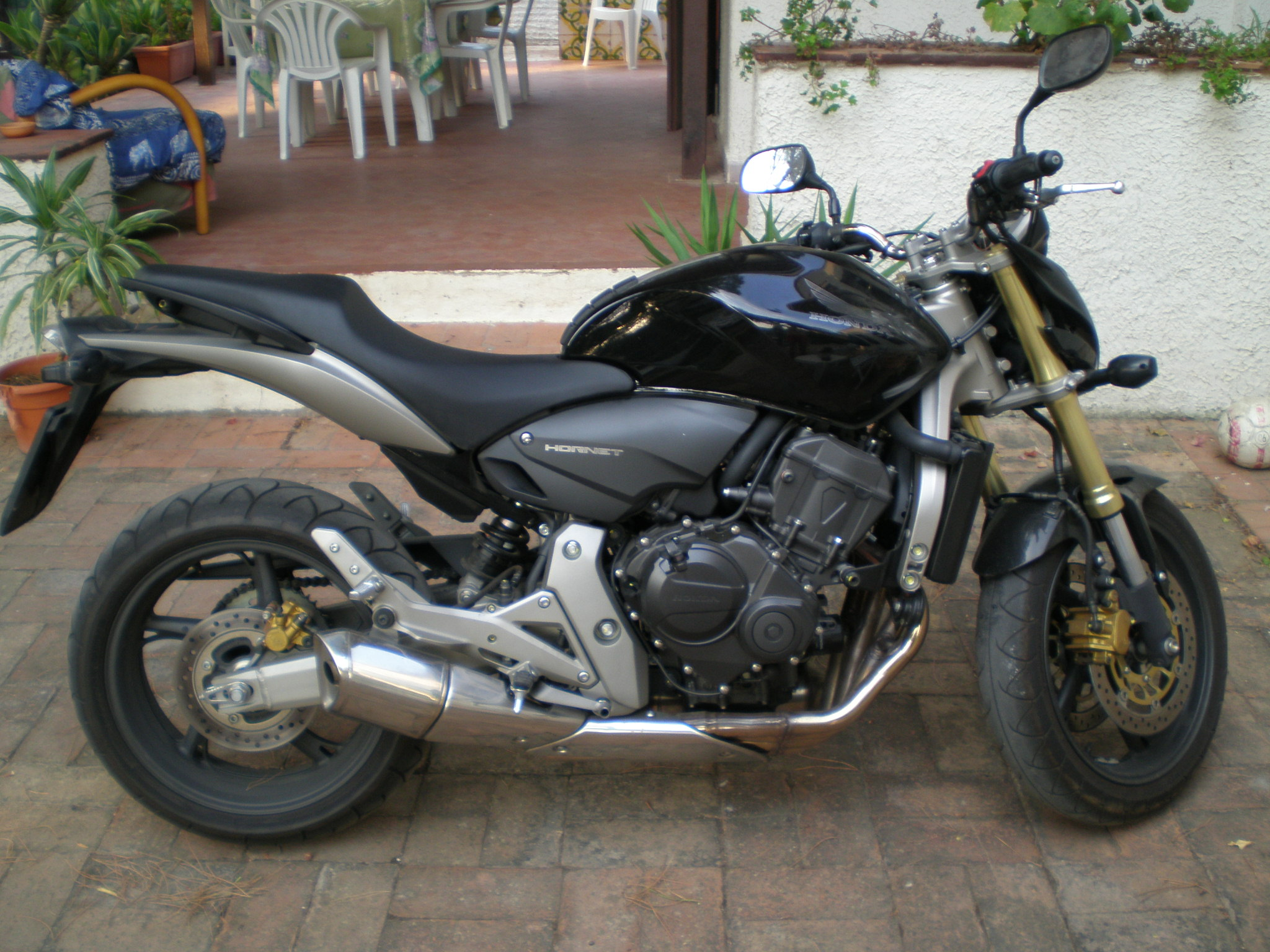
2007 Honda Hornet 900

The Honda CB900F is a Honda naked bike motorcycle introduced in 2002. It has the Honda model code SC48, utilizes a straight four-cylinder four-stroke 919 cc (56.1 cu in) engine, fuel injected and derived from the SC33 and SC44 CBR900RR.

This model was available from 2002 through 2007. It is called the Hornet 900 in Europe and the 919 in North America, while the related CB600F is the Hornet 600 in Europe and the 599 in North America. In 2008 the second version CB900 was replaced by the CB1000R.

== CB900F Hornet 2002 ==
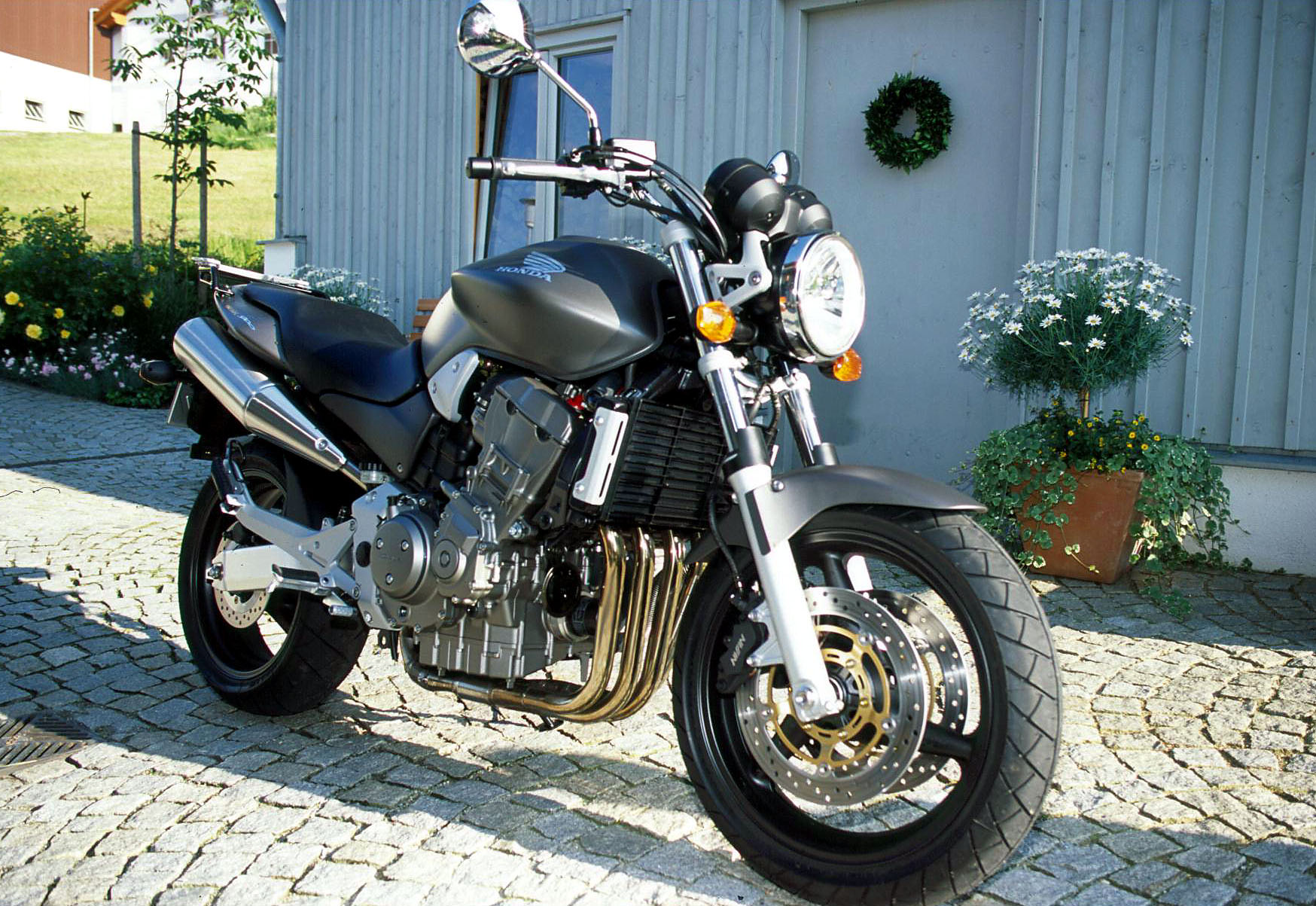
- Manufacturer: Honda
- Also called: Honda Hornet 900 (Europe); Honda 919 (United States)
- Production: 2002–2007
- Successor: CB1000R
- Class: Standard
- Engine: 919 cc (56.1 cu in) liquid-cooled straight four
- Bore / stroke: 71.0 mm × 58.0 mm (2.80 in × 2.28 in)
- Compression ratio: 10.8:1
- Top speed: 230.0 km/h (142.9 mph) 228.5 km/h (142.0 mph)
- Power: 71.9 kW (96.4 hp) 75 kW (101 hp) at 8,550 rpm 77 kW (103 hp), 80 kW (110 hp) at 9,000 rpm
- Torque: 84.9 N⋅m (62.6 lbf⋅ft) 91 N⋅m (67 lbf⋅ft) at 6,500 rpm 88.9 N⋅m (65.6 lbf⋅ft) at 7,550 rpm
- Ignition type: CDI
- Transmission: Cable-actuated wet clutch, 6 speed, chain final drive
- Frame type: Steel, square section backbone, engine is stressed member
- Suspension: Front: telescoping cartridge fork, adjustable after 2004; Rear: swingarm with single Showa shock, adjustable preload
- Brakes: Front: dual disc Rear: single disc
- Tires: Michelin Hi-Sport Front: 120/70-ZR17; Rear:180/55-ZR17
- Rake, trail: 25°, 98 mm (3.9 in)
- Wheelbase: 1,460 mm (57 in)
- Dimensions: L: 2,125 mm (83.7 in); W: 750 mm (30 in)
- Seat height: 795 mm (31.3 in)
- Weight: 206.0 kg (454.2 lb) (dry); 218.0 kg (480.6 lb), 220.0 kg (485.0 lb) (wet)
- Fuel capacity: 19 L (4.2 imp gal; 5.0 US gal)
- Fuel consumption: 6.11 L/100 km (46.2 mpg_{‑imp}; 38.5 mpg_{‑US}); 6.4 L/100 km (44 mpg_{‑imp}; 37 mpg_{‑US})
- Related: CB600F; CBR900RR

The Honda CB900F is a naked motorcycle; being based on a SC44 CBR900RR, but with the removal of fairings, the use of a conventional round headlight, a more upright seating position and revised engine and gearing, providing performance and comfort between a typical sport bike and a traditional standard. It was called the Hornet in Europe and the 919 in North America because the trademark for the vehicle name Hornet in North America was held by Chrysler, acquired after buying AMC, maker of the AMC Hornet car.

In some ways, the concept dates to a 1994 design study created by American Honda's R&D chief product evaluator Dirk Vandenberg in cooperation with Cycle World magazine, a streetfighter-like one-off custom based on the Honda CBR900RR, with the fairings removed, high, tubular handlebar, and tuning and gearing modified to boost low-end torque. Vandenberg saw a market in the "older sportbike crowd" who are seeking high performance without an awkward riding position or racetrack style bodywork.

It was introduced in 2002 and its last model year was 2007, after which it was replaced by the CB1000R. In 2006, Motorcyclist recommended used 919s as a good buy, saying of the new bike, "at $7999, it wasn't exactly cheap, and saddled with a coat of flat-black paint called Asphalt, it was less than visually electrifying," however, in the used market it became a great value. In the US market, the 919, like the 599, was expensive, because, being intended for the European market, they were made in Italy, and so had to be imported to the US against unfavorable Euro exchange rates.

The Daily Telegraph welcomed the new bike, saying, "the new CB900F Hornet leaves your knees in the breeze and your smile full of bugs as it reintroduces you to a feeling of undemanding, rewarding two-wheeled fun that has been missing from the market for a long time." Comparing it to the Hornet 600, the bike was reminiscent of the standards of the 1970s, sometimes called Universal Japanese Motorcycles.

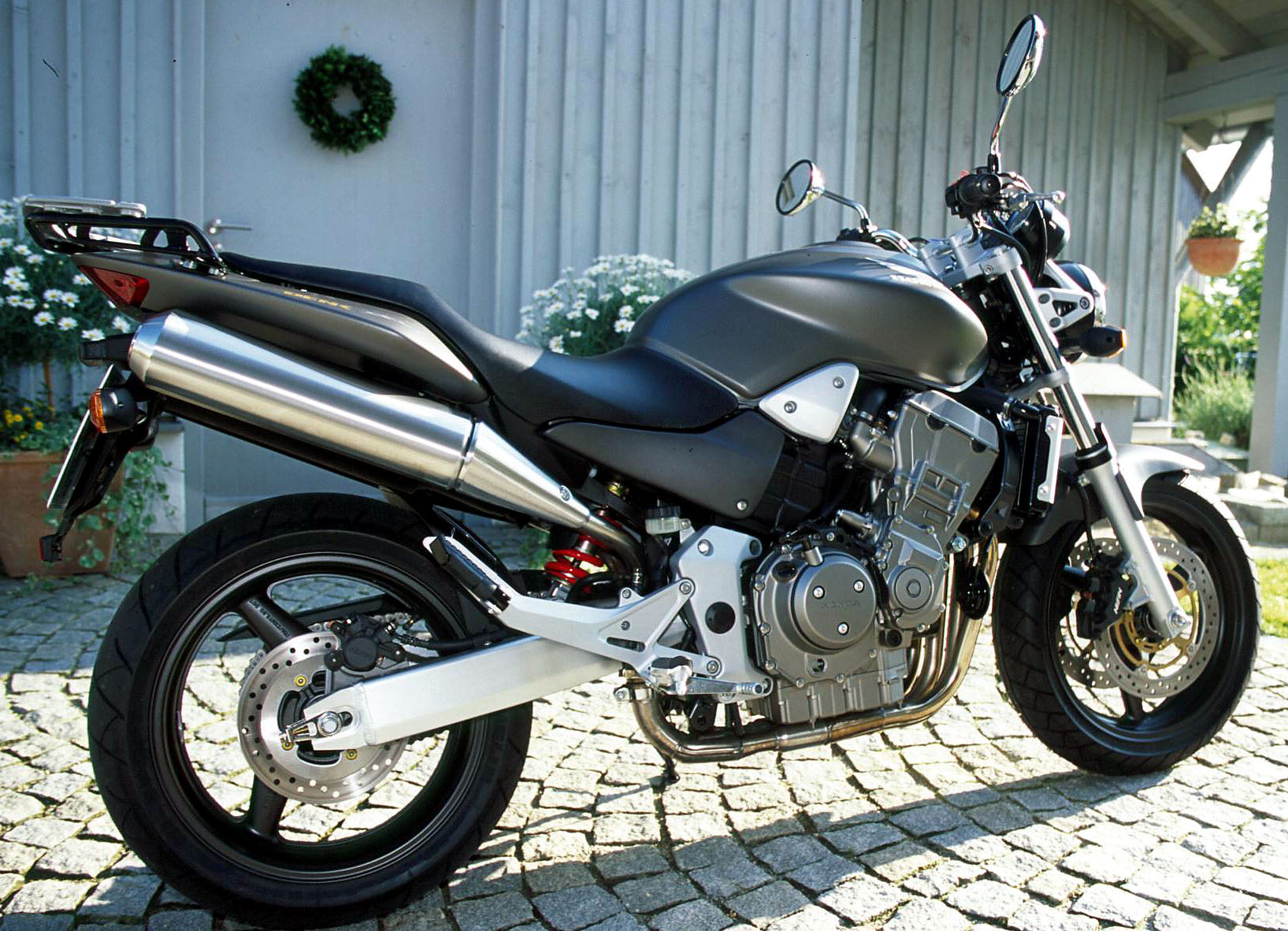
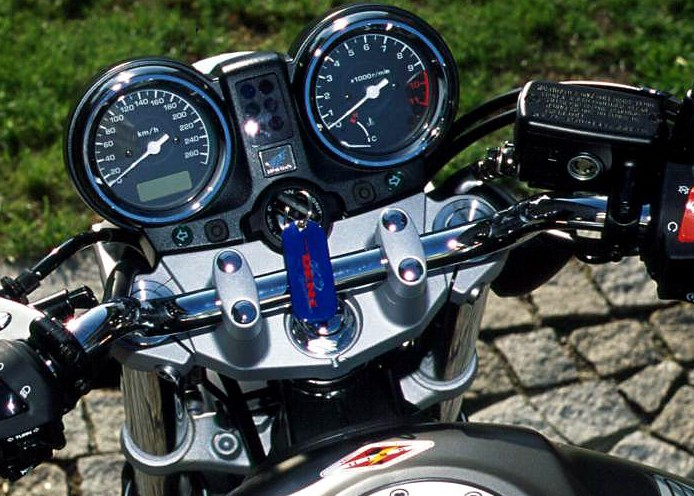
UK-spec Hornet

=== Design ===
The CB900F is powered by de-tuned SC44 Honda CBR900RR engine, developed by Tadao Baba, one of Honda's Large Project Leaders. The motor is a transversely mounted, liquid-cooled, fuel-injected 919 cc (56.1 cu in) in-line four-stroke, four-cylinder DOHC engine that produces around 100 hp (75 kW). The engine has cast camshafts and pistons instead of the more expensive forged versions found on the CBR929 and later. For greater midrange torque, the CB900F's camshaft lift is lower, and compression is slightly lowered. Four 36 mm (1.4 in) fuel-injection throttle bodies take the place of the CBR900RR's 38 mm (1.5 in) carburetors. Redline is 9500 rpm. The bike has a cable-actuated clutch, a six-speed transmission, and a chain final drive.

A steel, square-tube backbone frame supports the stressed member engine. In front, a cartridge fork (adjustable beginning in 2004) guides the wheel, while a single Showa shock, adjustable only for preload (and rebound damping beginning in 2004) connects with the aluminum swingarm and carries the weight in back. Its brakes are dual-disc in the front and single-disc in the rear.

Instrumentation consists of an analog speedometer and tachometer and basic indicator lamps, incorporated under a tinted window, and a single tripmeter. While it normally was equipped with a centerstand, California models did not have room for one due to additional emissions control equipment.

The rake is 25°, trail is 98 mm (3.9 in), wheelbase is 1,460 mm (57 in), and seat height is 800 mm (31 in). It has a tested dry weight (minus fuel only) of 206 kg (455 lb) and a tested wet weight of 220 kg (485 lb). The chain drive is a 530 chain with stock gearing of 16 tooth front and 43 tooth rear sprockets.

A 599 cc (36.6 cu in) carburetted version exists in the form of the CB600F, known as the Hornet 600 in Europe and the 599 in North America.

=== Performance ===
Quarter-mile performance for the second generation bike was 11.18 seconds at 194.2 km/h (120.7 mph) tested by Motorcyclist, while Cycle World measured 10.92 seconds at 198 km/h (123 mph). Having the lowest weight in its class and a good power-to-weight ratio, it stands well in comparison to bikes with greater output like the Yamaha FZ1, and the wide, high handlebars ease quick turning and make cornering enjoyable. The suspension of the early versions was criticized, but after the upgrade to an adjustable fork, the complaints died down. Cycle World saw the 919 as a practical solution to the real-world problem of imperfect roads and traffic, rather than a mere compromise between a sportbike and a commuter or touring ride.

== See also ==
- Honda CB900F, a naked inline-four from 1979 through 1983, without technical connection
- Honda CB900C
- Honda Hornet (disambiguation)
