= Honda X4 =

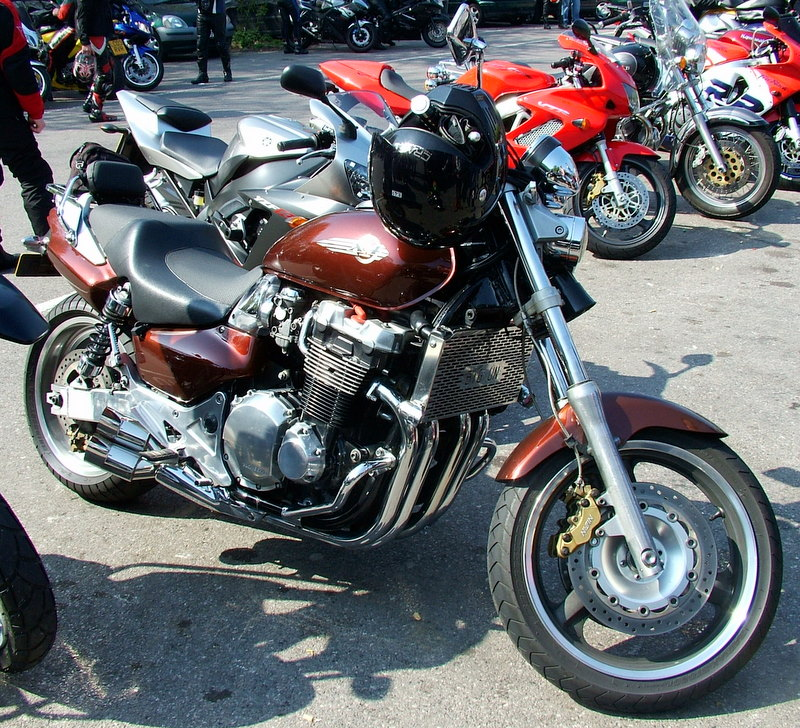
- Manufacturer: Honda
- Parent company: Honda
- Production: 1997–2003
- Class: Cruiser
- Engine: 1,284 cc (78.4 cu in) water-cooled inline 4
- Transmission: 5 speed manual, chain drive
- Suspension: Front: Telescopic fork Rear: Swingarm dual shock
- Brakes: Front: 310 mm 2 discs, 2 piston calipers, Rear: 275 mm disc
- Tires: Front: 120/70R18; Rear: 190/60R17
- Rake, trail: 31°, 135.0 mm (5.31 in)
- Wheelbase: 1,650 mm (65 in)
- Dimensions: L: 2,330 mm (92 in); W: 74.50 mm (2.933 in)
- Seat height: 730 mm (29 in)
- Fuel capacity: 15 L (3.3 imp gal; 4.0 US gal)
- Related: Honda CB1300

The Honda X4 is a 1,284 cc (78.4 cu in) cruiser motorcycle produced by Honda for model years 1997 through 2003.

Its powerful transverse-mounted, inline four-cylinder, water-cooled engine was later used in the 1998 through 2002 model years of the Honda CB1300, although the X4 version had different carburetors and was geared to provide more low-end torque. The X4 is characterized by its low-slung profile, solid disc rear wheel, bulbous yet angular side panels, and stubby, large-diameter, chrome exhausts.

== X4 LD ==
In the 2000 model year, a new version, the X4 LD ("Low Down"), was introduced. It offered a slightly lower seat and overall frame, improved suspension (with "piggyback"-style Showa rear shock absorbers), and minor cosmetic differences including an unpainted engine block (versus the black of the original) and lightweight latticework inner rotors on the front brakes (the originals were solid discs).
