= Honda CB1300 =

Honda CB1300 Super Four
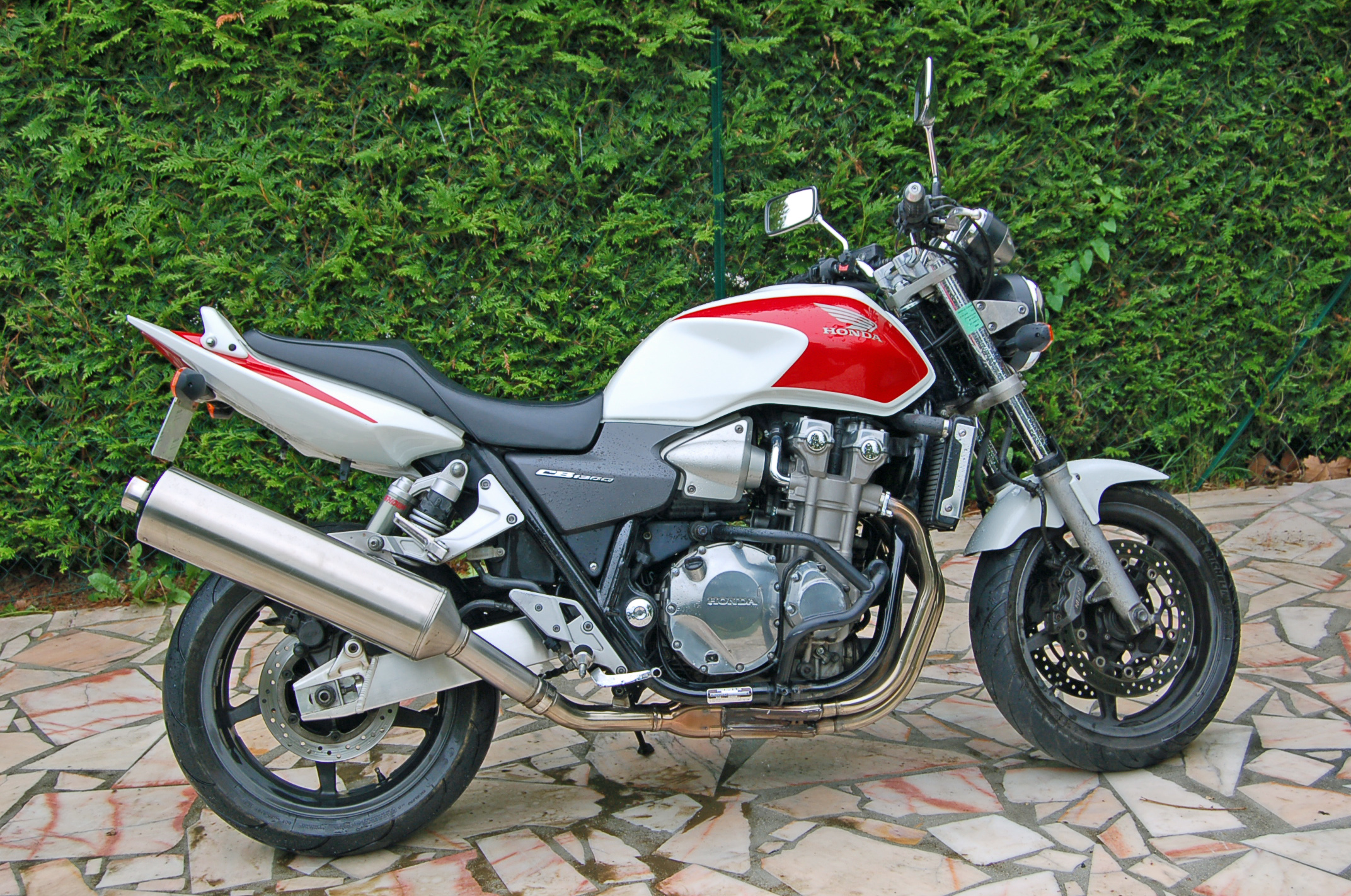
- Manufacturer: Honda
- Production: 1998–2025
- Assembly: Japan
- Predecessor: Honda CB1000 Super Four
- Successor: Honda CB1000F
- Class: Standard
- Engine: 1,284 cc (78.4 cu in) liquid-cooled 4-stroke 16-valve DOHC inline-four
- Bore / stroke: 78.0 mm × 67.2 mm (3.1 in × 2.6 in)
- Compression ratio: 9.6:1
- Power: 75 kW (100 hp) @ 7,500 rpm
- Transmission: 5/6-speed
- Frame type: Steel double-cradle
- Suspension: Front: 43 mm (1.7 in) cartridge-type telescopic fork with adjustable preload and adjustable compression and rebound damping, 109 mm (4.3 in) axle travel; Rear: Swingarm, twin piggy-back shock absorbers, adjustable for preload and combined compression/rebound damping
- Brakes: Front: Double 4-piston calipers with double 310 mm (12.2 in) discs; Rear: 2-piston caliper with single 256 mm (10.1 in) disc
- Wheelbase: 1,520–1,545 mm (59.8–60.8 in)
- Dimensions: L: 2,200 mm (86.6 in); W: 780–825 mm (30.7–32.5 in); H: 1,125–1,215 mm (44.3–47.8 in)
- Seat height: 780–790 mm (30.7–31.1 in)
- Fuel capacity: 21 L (4.6 imp gal; 5.5 US gal)

The Honda CB1300 Super Four is a CB series 1,284 cc (78.4 cu in) standard Honda motorcycle released in 1998 as a successor to the CB1000 Super Four. Its engine, with minor modifications, came from the X4, released in the previous year. In 2003, the CB1300 received a slightly different engine which lacked cooling fins.

== History ==
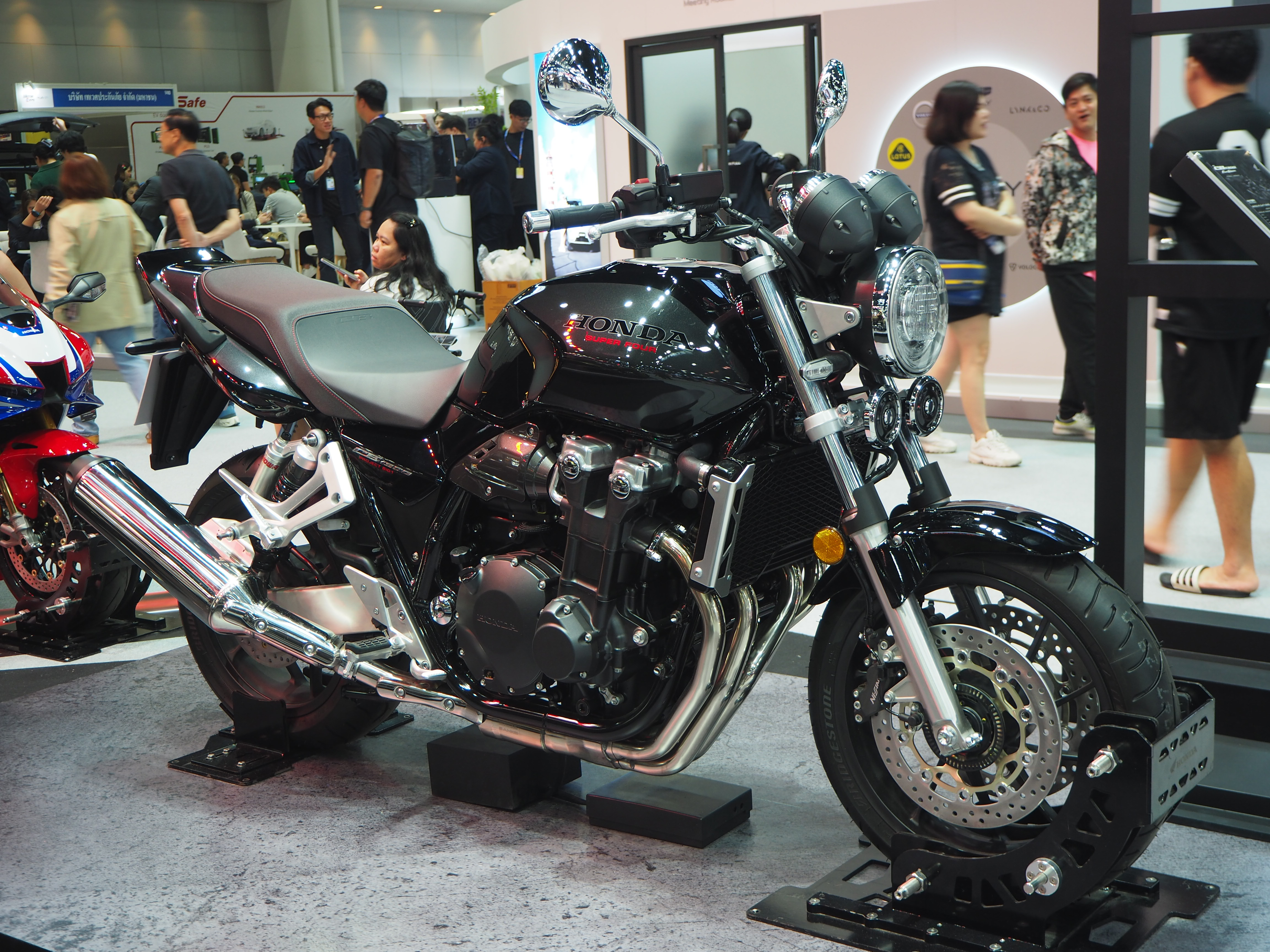
2025 CB1300 Super Four

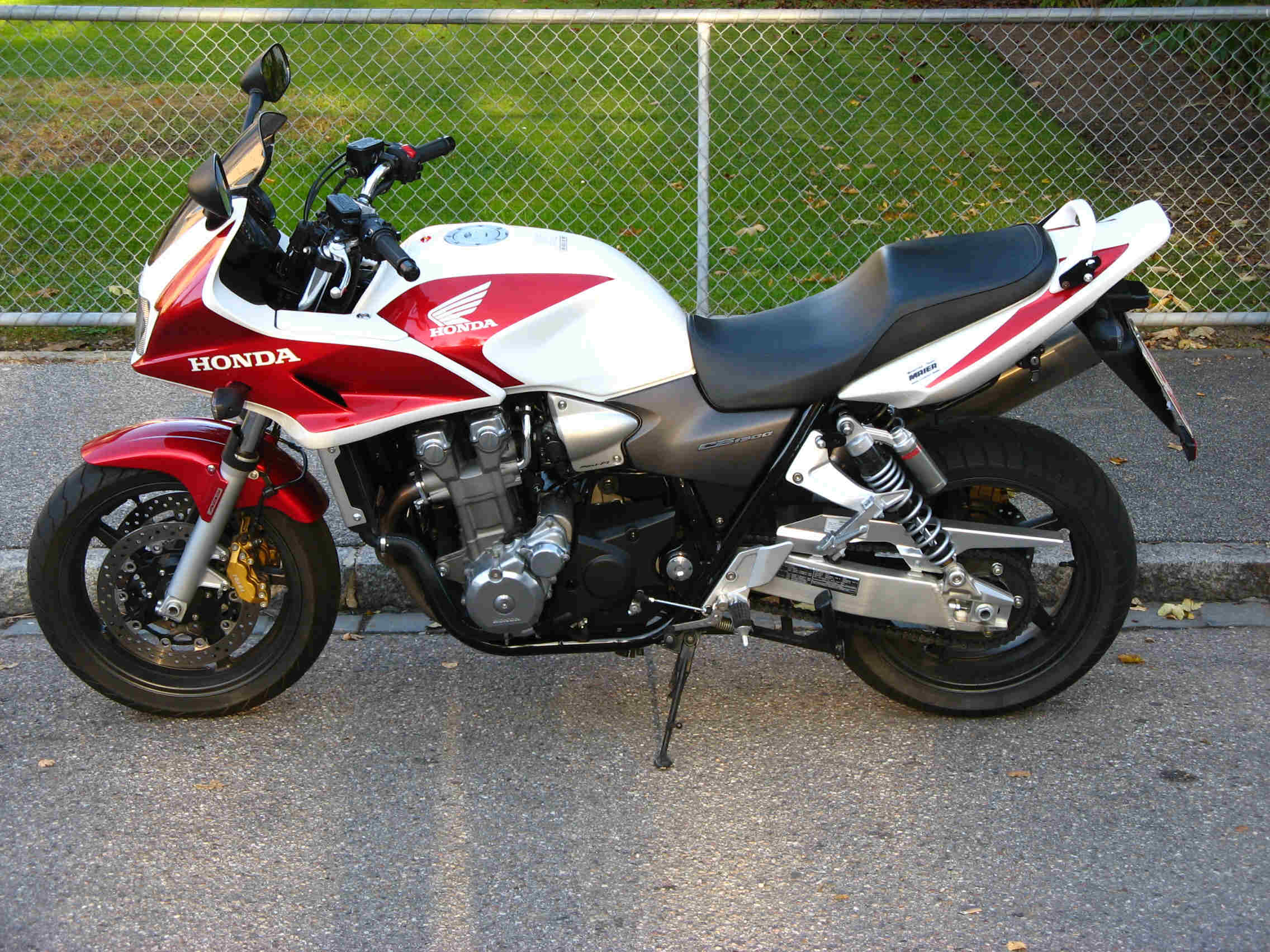
CB1300S Super Bol D'Or

The first CB1300 was released in February 1998.

The models made before 2003 with the faux cooling fins were known internally as the SC40 while the models made after 2003 were known as the SC54.

Beginning in 2005, Honda offered two versions of the CB1300: the standard, unfaired model, and the Super Bol D'Or (in Europe the CB1300S), with half fairing.

The 2018 model, only available in Japan, had some performance and exhaust changes bringing power up to 109 hp. The 2021 model adds a throttle-by-wire system with riding modes and cruise control.

== Distribution ==
The CB1300 has never been sold by authorized dealers in the United States or Canada. Gray market importers brought in small numbers.

== Variant ==
The Honda CB1300P is a police variant based on the CB1300SB. It is mostly used by Japanese law enforcement.
