= Honda CB900C =

CB900C
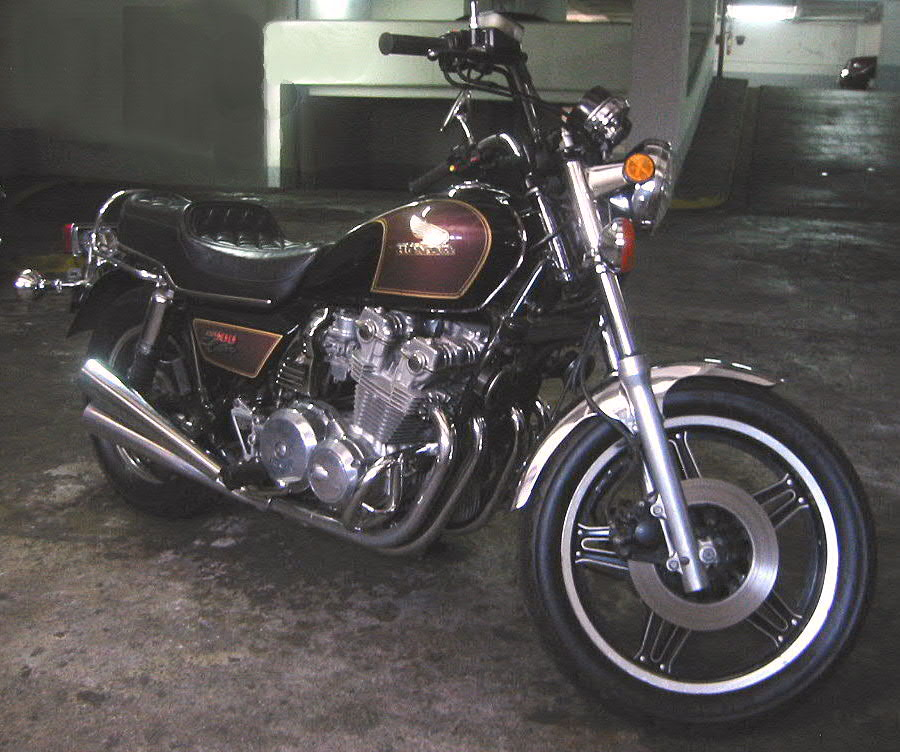
- 1981 CB900C
- Manufacturer: Honda
- Predecessor: CB900
- Successor: CB1000C
- Engine: 902 cc (55.0 cu in) 16-valve, DOHC air-cooled inline-4 4 carburetors
- Top speed: 124 mph (200 km/h)
- Transmission: 5-speed (dual ratio giving 10 speeds) manual, shaft drive
- Suspension: Front: Telescopic fork Rear: Twin shock
- Brakes: Front: 2× disc brakes Rear: Disc
- Weight: 259 kg (571 lb) (dry); 277 kg (611 lb) (wet)
- Fuel consumption: 42 mpg_{‑US} (5.6 L/100 km; 50 mpg_{‑imp})
- Related: CB750K, CB900F, CB1100F

The Honda CB900C is a cruiser motorcycle produced by Honda from 1980 to 1982 primarily for the American market. It was succeeded by the CB1000C in 1983.

== Design ==
The CB900c had a front and rear air assisted suspension, shaft drive, and a dual-range sub-transmission. The CB900C was derived from the DOHC CB750K, and is closely related to the CB900F and the 1983-only CB1100F, both derivatives of the CB750 line.

The air/oil cooled DOHC 902 cc (55.0 cu in) engine has 4 32 mm Keihin CV carburetors and electronic ignition. The front suspension relies on air pressure for preload while the rear uses air as the main springing medium. The bike has two front disc brakes and a single rear disc.

The CB900C is something of a "parts bin" bike, as it shares components with two contemporary Honda bikes, the CB750 and CB900F. The GL and CX series of touring motorcycles of the time are the source of the final drive and rear suspension assemblies of the CB900C. The frame was derived from the European CB900F, extended 2 inches to accommodate the sub-transmission components. The sub-transmission involves a jack shaft that allows the rider to select a "high" or "low" range for the five gears, effectively giving an overdrive 6th speed for cruising.

Full Honda accessories, (fairings, lower leg fairings, saddlebags and trunk) were available to help make the CB900C a touring motorcycle.

== Reception ==
The Rider and Cycle World reviews of 1980 were less than enthusiastic, complaining of "a lack of purity in the custom styling". The excessive weight and the soft suspension had a detrimental effect on handling and on cornering ability. Despite the lacklustre reviews, the CB900 Custom has gained a small cult following due to its 10 speeds, styling, comfort, reliability, and ample power output.

== 1983 CB1000C (Custom) ==
In 1983, Honda replaced the CB900C with the CB1000C. The CB1000C used the dual-range transmission previously available on the CB900C. The 978 cc (59.7 cu in) version included the TRAC anti-dive system also used on the 1983 CB1100F.
