= Honda CB1000R =

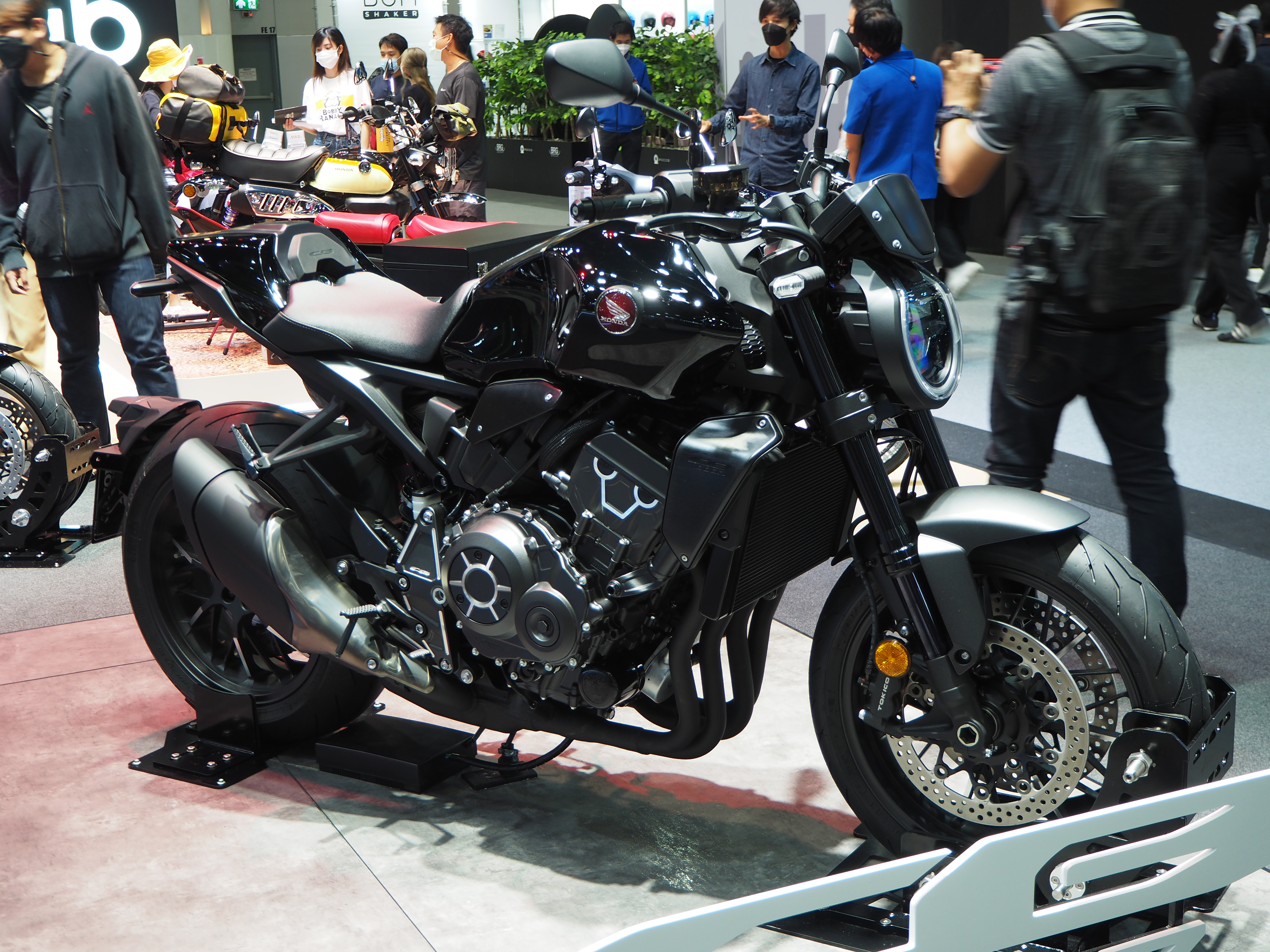
- 2021 Honda CB1000R SC80
- Manufacturer: Honda
- Production: 2008–2016 (SC60); 2018–present (SC80)
- Predecessor: Honda CB900F
- Class: Standard; Naked bike

The Honda CB1000R is a CB series 1,000 cc (61 cu in) four-cylinder standard or naked motorcycle made by Honda from 2008 to 2016, and resumed from 2018.

== History ==
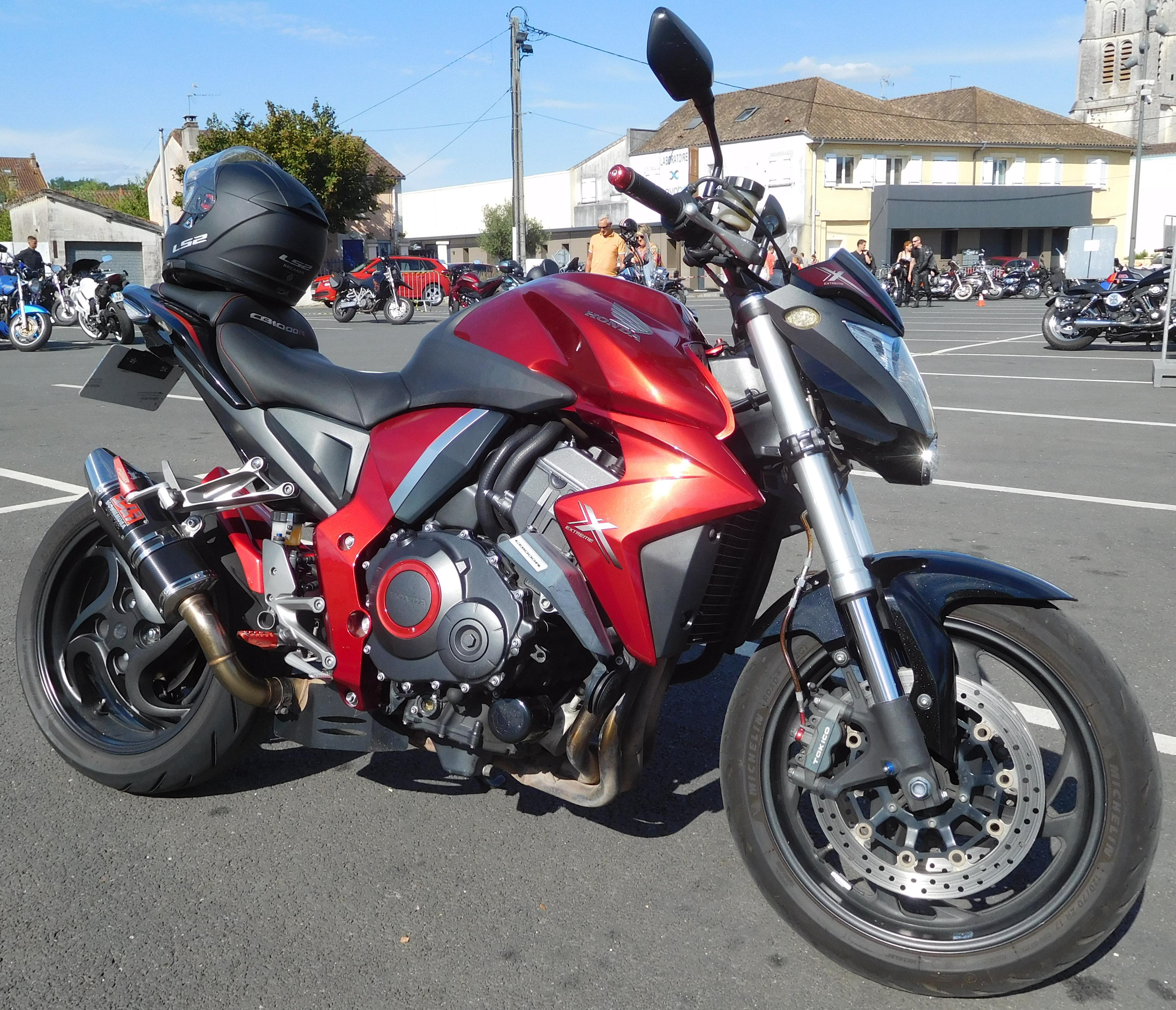
Honda CB1000R SC60

It was unveiled at EICMA November 2007 as a replacement for the Honda CB900F Hornet, the US-market's 919.

The CB1000R's styling cues are borrowed from the 2007 CB600F Hornet. The engine is a detuned version of the 2007 CBR1000RR engine, and produces about 81.61 kW (109.44 hp) at the rear wheel. The front suspension uses a 43 mm (1.7 in) inverted HMAS cartridge-type telescopic fork with stepless preload with compression/rebound adjustments and 110 mm (4.3 in) travel. The rear is a monoshock with gas-charged HMAS damper with 10-step preload and stepless rebound damping adjustment and 130 mm (5.0 in) axle travel.

In November 2017, Honda unveiled the new iteration of the CB1000R, along with the CB125R and CB300R. The bike uses a new styling direction dubbed as Neo Sports Café. This design language has been applied before to the CB150R ExMotion and then applied to the CB650R, the successor of the CB650F.

== Specifications ==
	2008–2016 (SC60)	2018–present (SC80)
Engine	998 cc (60.9 cu in) liquid-cooled 4-stroke 16-valve DOHC inline-four	
Bore/stroke	75 mm × 56.5 mm (2.95 in × 2.22 in)	
Compression ratio	11.2:1	11.6:1
Power	92 kW (123 hp)/10,000rpm (claimed); 81.61 kW (109.44 hp) (tested)	107 kW (143 hp)/10,500rpm (claimed)
Torque	99 N⋅m (73 lb⋅ft)/7,750rpm (claimed); 87.38 N⋅m (64.45 lbf⋅ft)	104 N⋅m (77 lb⋅ft)/8,250rpm(claimed)
Fuel Tank	16.2 L (3.6 imp gal; 4.3 US gal)	
Transmission	6-speed	
Frame	Mono-backbone cast aluminum	Mono-backbone steel
Front suspension	Inverted 43 mm (1.7 in) telescopic fork	43 mm (1.7 in) Showa SFF-BP fork with spring preload, rebound and compression damping adjustability
Rear suspension	Single-sided swingarm, monoshock 128mm axle travel	Single-sided swingarm, monoshock 131mm axle travel
Front Brakes	2 × 310 mm (12 in) disc, radial 4-piston calipers	
Rear brakes	256 mm (10.1 in) disc	
Tires	Front: 120/70–17; Rear: 180/55–17	Front: 120/70/17; Rear: 190/55-17
Rake/trail	25°, 98.7 mm (3.89 in)	25°, 100 mm (3.9 in)
Wheelbase	1,445 mm (56.9 in)	1,455 mm (57.3 in)
Length	2,105 mm (82.9 in)	2,120 mm (83 in)
Width	805 mm (31.7 in)	789 mm (31.1 in)
Height	1,095 mm (43.1 in)	1,090 mm (43 in)
Seat height	825 mm (32.5 in)	830 mm (33 in)
Kerb weight	217 kg (478 lb); ABS:222 kg (489 lb)	212 kg (467 lb)
