= Honda CB300R =

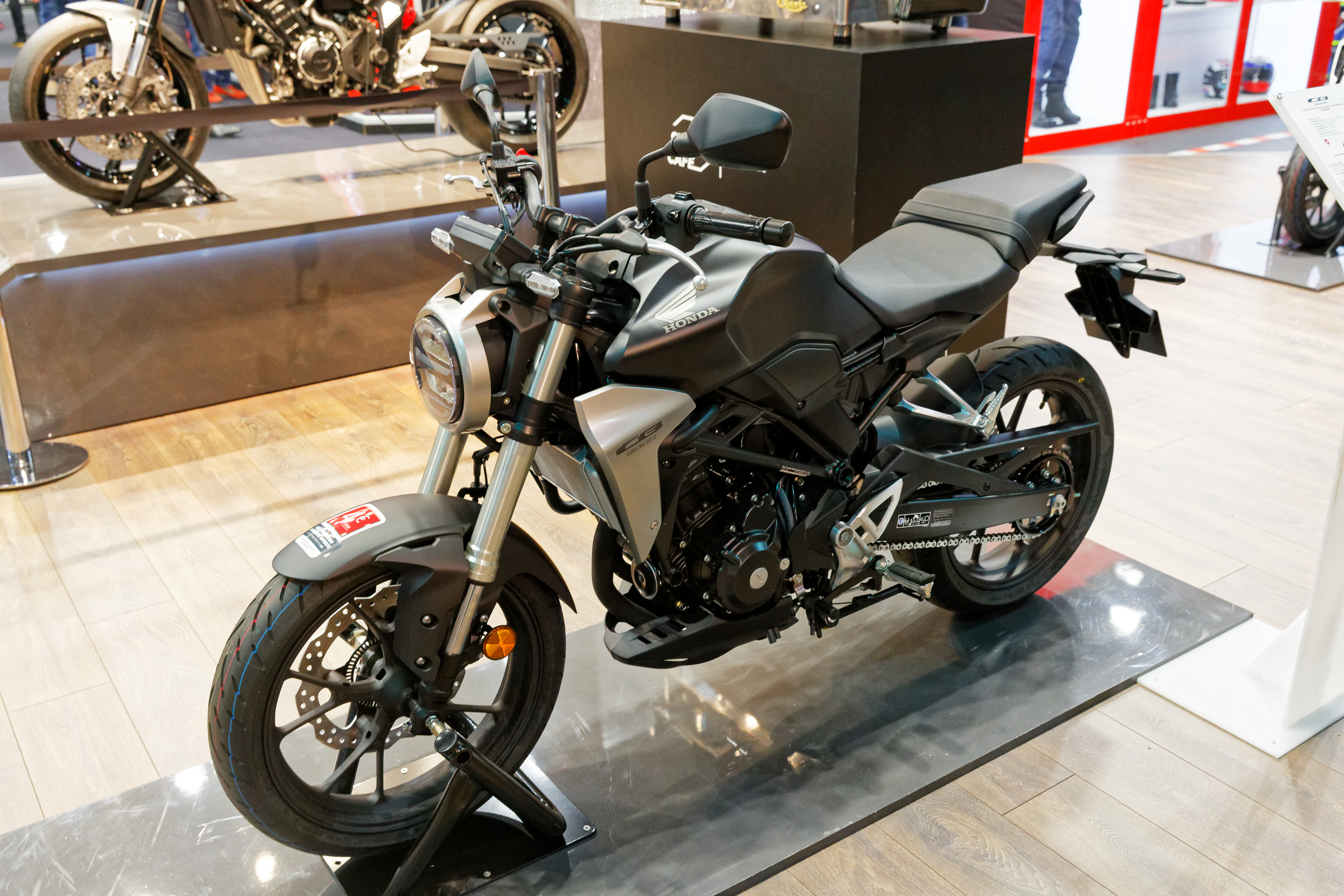
- Manufacturer: Honda
- Production: 2017 - Present
- Assembly: Thailand (A.P. Honda) India (HMSI)
- Predecessor: Honda CB300F
- Class: Standard; Naked bike
- Engine: 286 cc (17.5 cu in) liquid-cooled 4-stroke 4-valve DOHC single-cylinder
- Bore / stroke: 76 mm × 63 mm (3.0 in × 2.5 in)
- Compression ratio: 10.7:1
- Top speed: 150 km/h (93 mph)
- Power: 23.1 kW (31.0 hp; 31.4 PS) @ 8,500 rpm (claimed); 20.5 kW (27.5 hp; 27.9 PS) @ 8,290 rpm (rear wheel)
- Torque: 27.5 N⋅m (20.3 lbf⋅ft) @ 7,500 rpm (claimed); 25.38 N⋅m (18.72 lbf⋅ft) @ 6,550 rpm (rear wheel)
- Transmission: 6-speed constant mesh, chain drive
- Suspension: Front: Inverted 41 mm (1.6 in) telescopic fork, 130 mm (5.1 in) travel; Rear: Swingarm, 5-way preload adjustable monoshock with Pro-Link, 107 mm (4.2 in) travel
- Brakes: Front: Radially-mounted 4-piston Nissin caliper with single floating 296 mm (11.7 in) disc; Rear: Single-piston caliper with single 220 mm (8.7 in) disc
- Tires: Front: 110/70–17; Rear: 150/60–17
- Rake, trail: 24.7°, 94 mm (3.7 in)
- Wheelbase: 1,352 mm (53.2 in)
- Dimensions: L: 2,012 mm (79.2 in); W: 802 mm (31.6 in); H: 1,052 mm (41.4 in)
- Seat height: 799 mm (31.5 in)
- Weight: 143 kg (315 lb) (claimed) (wet)
- Fuel capacity: 10 L (2.2 imp gal; 2.6 US gal)

The Honda CB300R is a CB series 286 cc (17.5 cu in) single-cylinder standard/naked bike made by Honda since 2017. The CB300R debuted at the 2017 EICMA, and went on sale in Europe and Asia in 2017 and the US in 2018. It is one of the Neo Sports Café lineup of bikes offered by Honda, reflected by the model number being the CBF300NA, with the others being the CB125R, the Thai-market CB150R, CB250R, CB650R and 2018 CB1000R.

The CB250R is a lower-displacement variant of the CB300R sold in Japan and Malaysia.

== Features ==
The bike features full LED lighting, a digital gauge cluster and a shift light.

Not featured are riding modes, traction control system, adjustable levers, hazard lights, cornering lights, adaptive brake light, engine braking control, Bluetooth, stability control or cornering ABS.

Some model years and markets replace the gauge cluster's temperature readout with a gear indicator.

=== 2017 - 2021 ===
The CB300RA variant offered a dual-channel ABS system powered by an IMU to detect liftoff conditions.

=== 2022 Update ===
Four new colors were introduced, as well as an assist-and-slipper clutch, upgraded 41mm Showa SFF-BP forks, as well as standard dual-channel ABS.
