= Honda CB1000 Super Four =

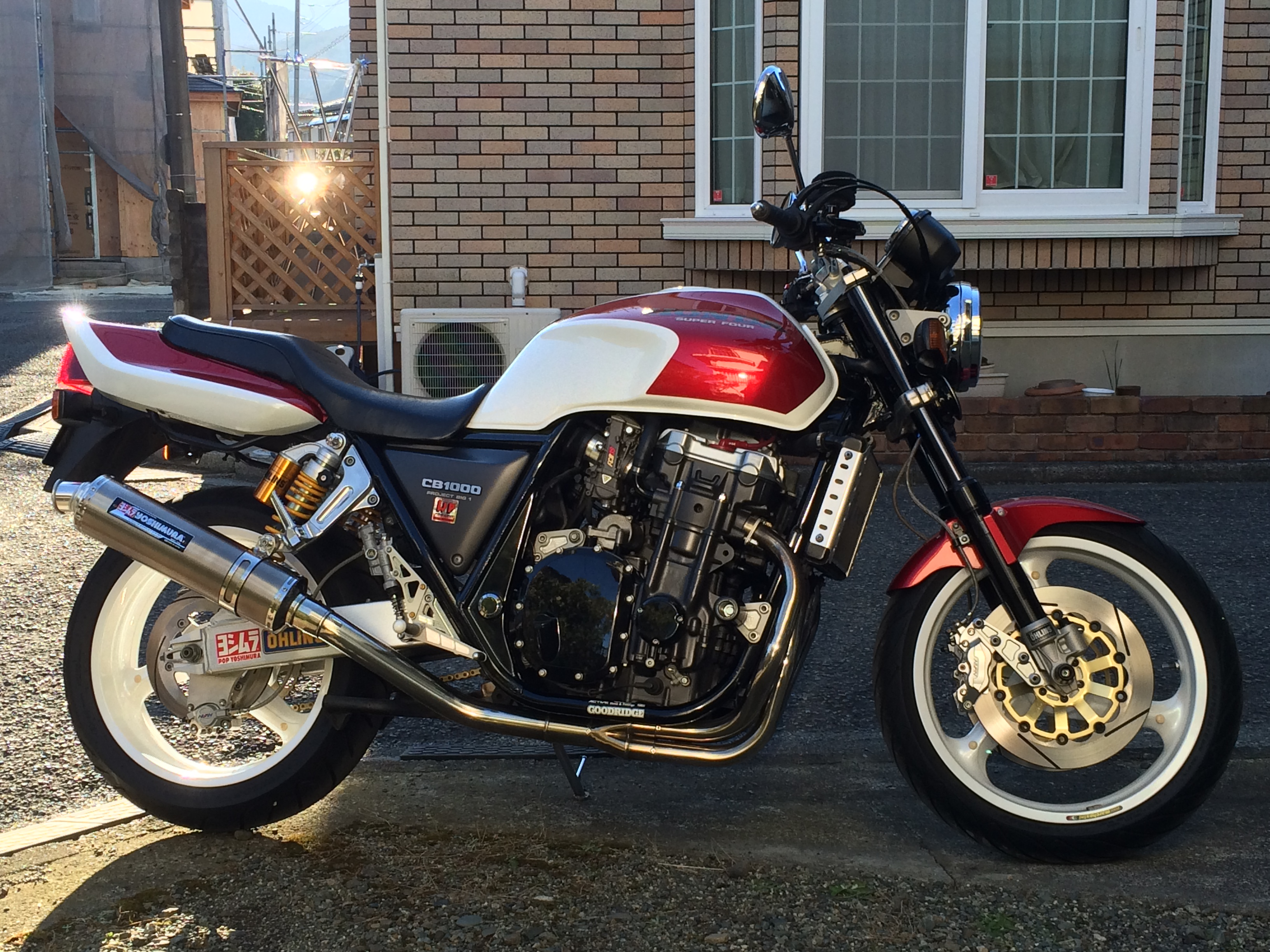
- Manufacturer: Honda
- Production: 1992–1998
- Assembly: Japan
- Predecessor: Honda CB1100F
- Successor: Honda CB1300 Super Four
- Class: Standard
- Engine: 998 cc (60.9 cu in) liquid-cooled 4-stroke 16-valve DOHC inline-four
- Bore / stroke: 77.0 mm × 53.6 mm (3.0 in × 2.1 in)
- Compression ratio: 10.0:1
- Top speed: 222 km/h (138 mph); 206 km/h (128 mph)
- Power: 72.9 kW (97.7 hp) @ 8,250 rpm; 71.2 kW (95.5 hp) @ 8,500 rpm
- Torque: 89.5 N⋅m (66.0 lb⋅ft) @ 5,750 rpm; 84.6 N⋅m (62.4 lb⋅ft) @ 6,000 rpm
- Frame type: Steel double-cradle
- Brakes: Front: Axially-mounted double 2-piston Nissin calipers with double 310 mm (12.2 in) discs; Rear: Single-piston Nissin caliper with single 276 mm (10.9 in) disc
- Rake, trail: 24°, 99 mm (3.9 in)
- Wheelbase: 1,540 mm (60.6 in)
- Dimensions: L: 2,220 mm (87.4 in); W: 785 mm (30.9 in); H: 1,130 mm (44.5 in)
- Seat height: 790 mm (31.1 in)
- Weight: 246 kg (542 lb) (dry); 262 kg (578 lb) (wet)
- Fuel capacity: 22 L (4.8 imp gal; 5.8 US gal)
- Fuel consumption: 6.9 L/100 km (41 mpg_{‑imp}; 34 mpg_{‑US})

The Honda CB1000 Super Four (model code SC30) is a CB series standard motorcycle made by Honda from 1992 to 1996. Nicknamed "The Big One", it utilized a DOHC 998 cc (60.9 cu in) inline four, which was derived from the CBR1000F. It was briefly sold in the US from 1994 and 1995.
