= Honda 650 standard and sport motorcycles =

Type of motorcycle produced by Honda

Honda CBR650R
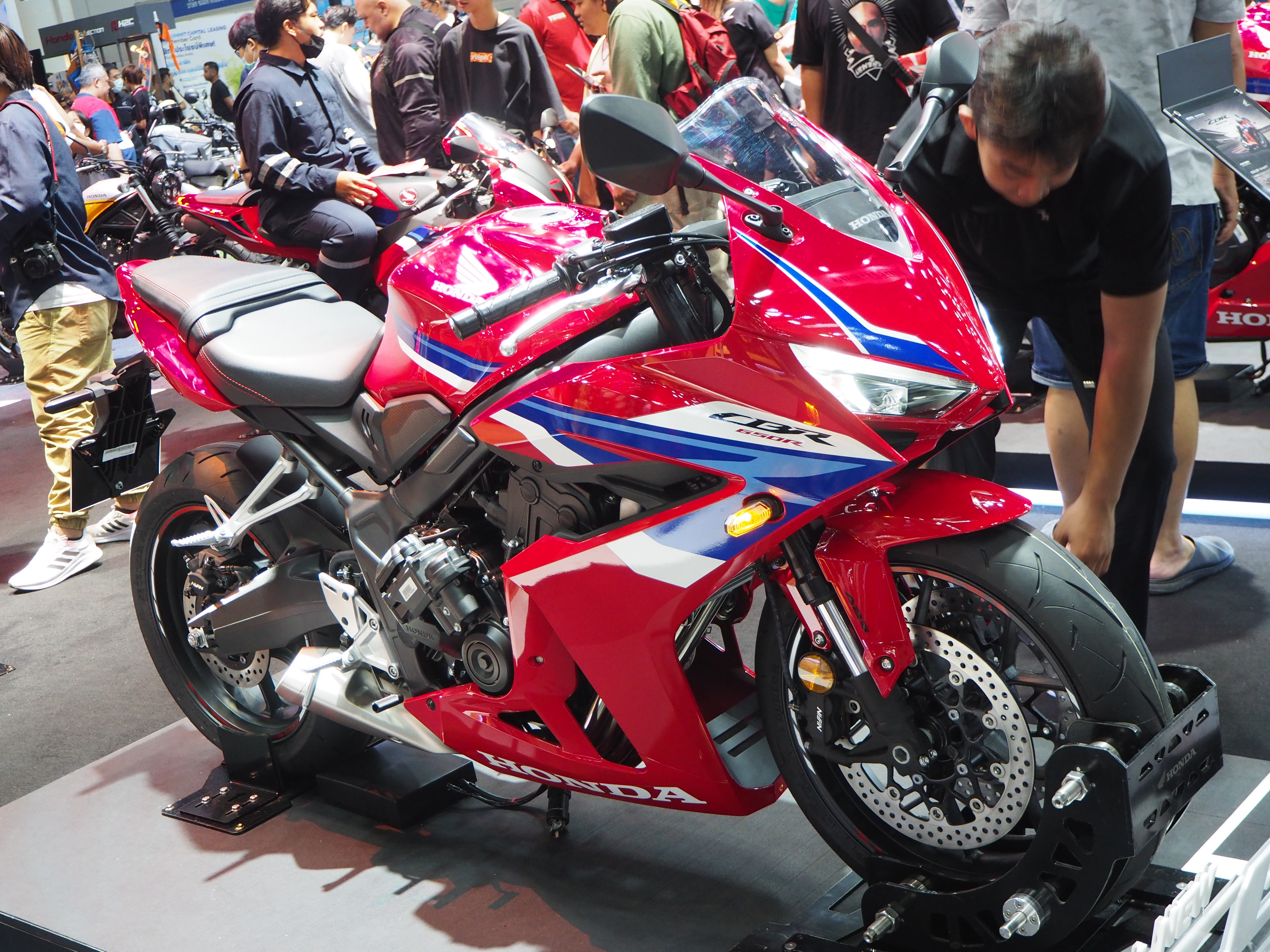
- 2024 CBR650R
- Manufacturer: Honda
- Production: 2013-present
- Predecessor: Honda CBR650F
- Class: Sport bike
- Engine: 649 cc (39.6 cu in) inline-four

The Honda 650 standard and sport motorcycles are a range of 649 cc (39.6 cu in) inline-four standard and sport motorcycles made by Honda since 2013. The line includes the CB650F standard or 'naked bike', and the CBR650F sport bike that replaced outgoing CB600F Hornet.

The motorcycles have a new twin-spar steel chassis and a new inline-4 engine with a longer stroke increasing the displacement to 650 cc. ABS is optional, and a variant with ABS standard and restricted air intakes reduces the power below the 35 kW (47 hp) limit for the European A2 license. They have four-into-one side-swept exhaust headers with a stubby exhaust muffler, which Honda claims improve mass centralization. Honda made significant technical and cosmetic updates in 2017.

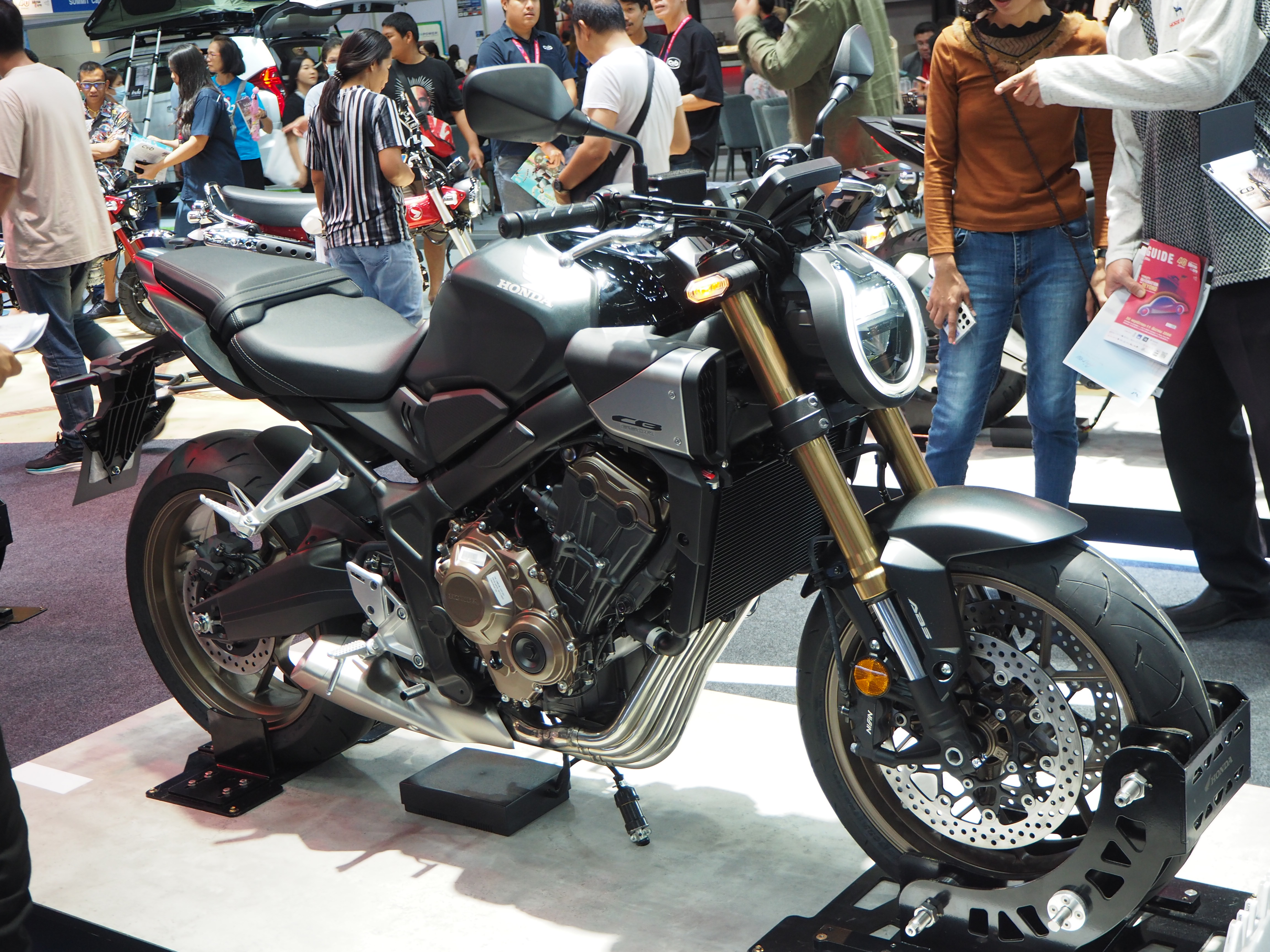
2023 Honda CB650R

In November 2018, at EICMA, Honda announced the CB650R naked bike with their Neo Sports Café styling previously introduced on the CB1000R and CB300R, and the CBR650R sport bike with new Fireblade-style fairing. Both motorcycles also received significant chassis and engine updates.

== Model history ==
=== 2014 "CB650F/CBR650F" (RC74) ===
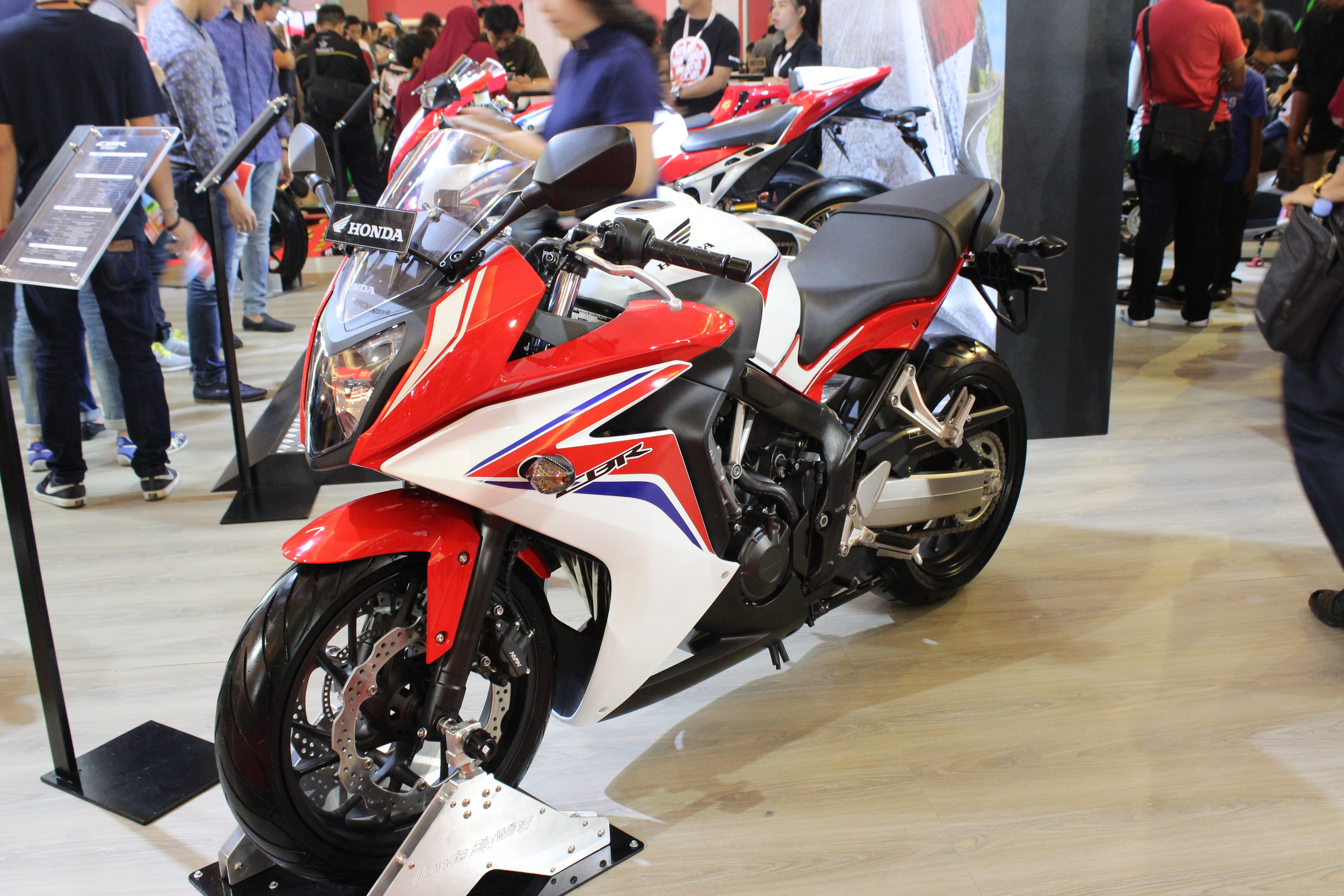
2016 Honda CBR650F in Tricolor

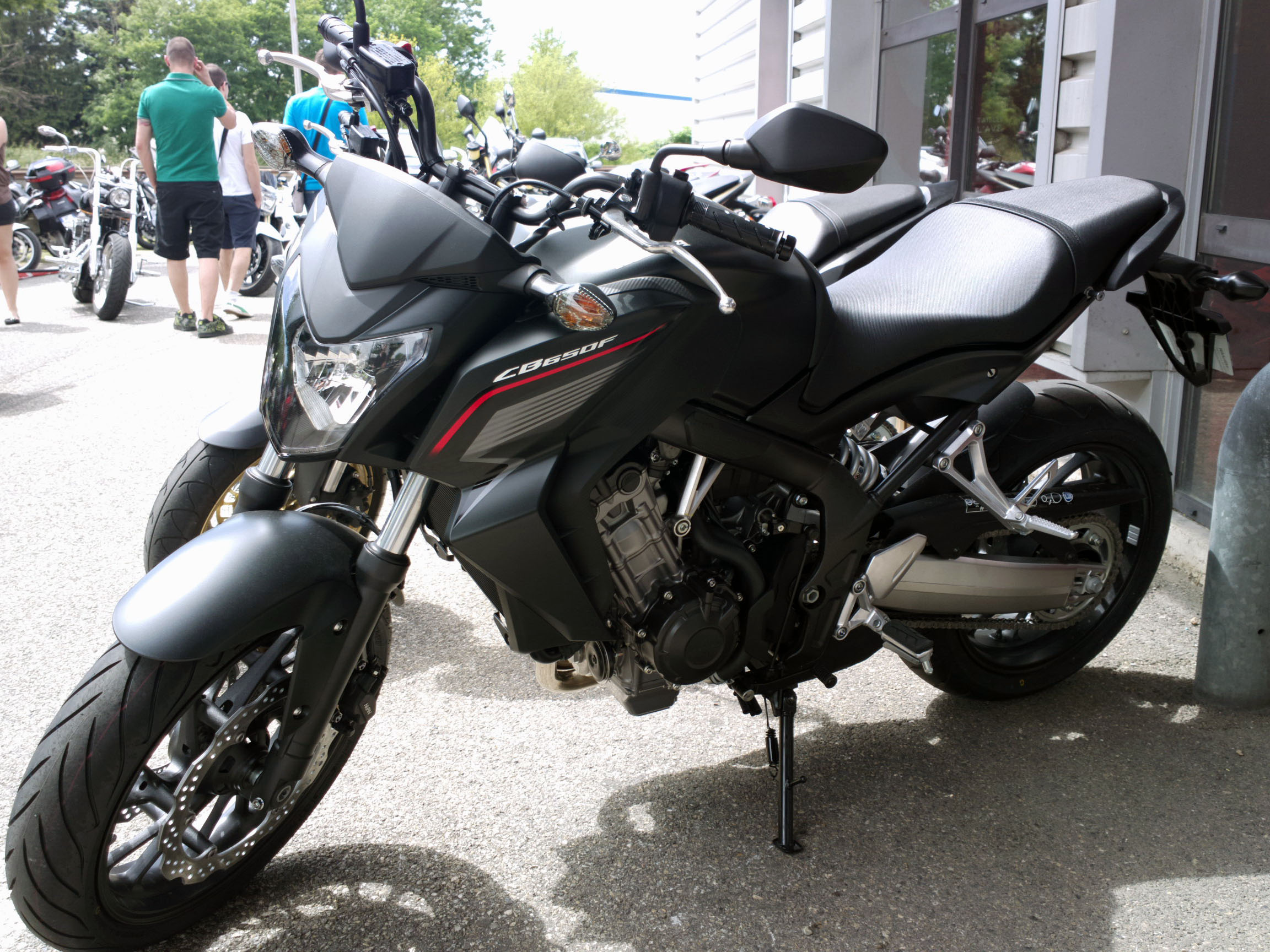
2014 Honda CB650F

Successor to the Hornet Honda CB600F and Honda CBR600F, The all-new 650 class comes with the standard "naked" version the CB650F, and the full fairing sport version the CBR650F . Based on the style of the 600F, this model still gets a single triangle front lamp, hi clip-on, and the one piece seat. This model is offered in red and matte black color, which some markets get the iconic Honda Tri-color scheme.

=== 2016 "CB650F/CBR650F" (RC74) ===
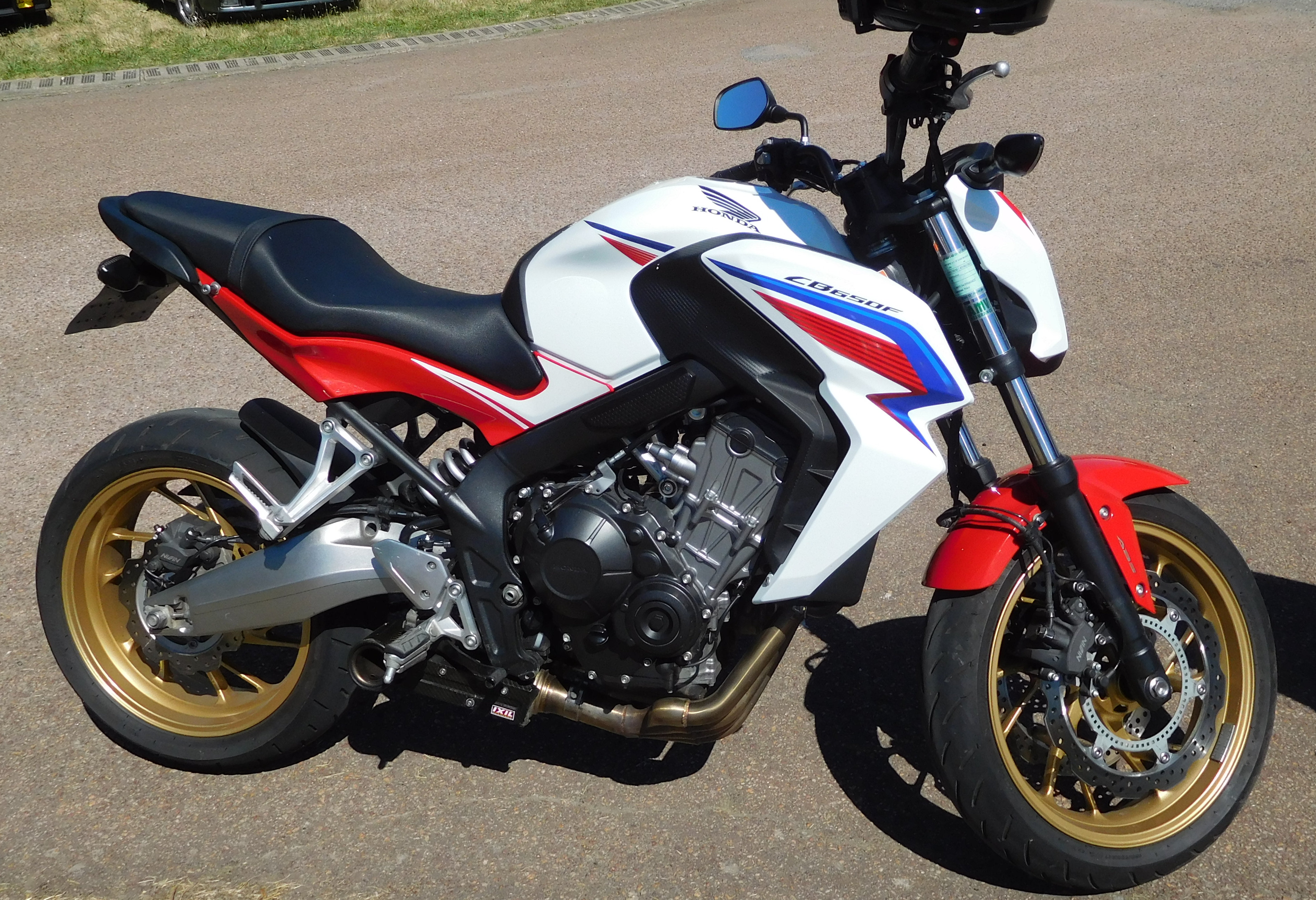
2016 Honda CB650F

Livery update with red frame and white frame.

=== 2017 "CB650F/CBR650F" (RC96) ===
Honda has freshened up the mid-life by the new color scheme and the Euro 4 emissions regulation, the crankcase color has changed from black to bronze color, LED headlights, updated air intake flow path, smaller two-chamber exhaust muffler, lowered gear ratios, Showa Dual Bending Valve (SDBV) front suspension, ABS standard.

=== 2019 "CB650R/CBR650R" (RH01) ===
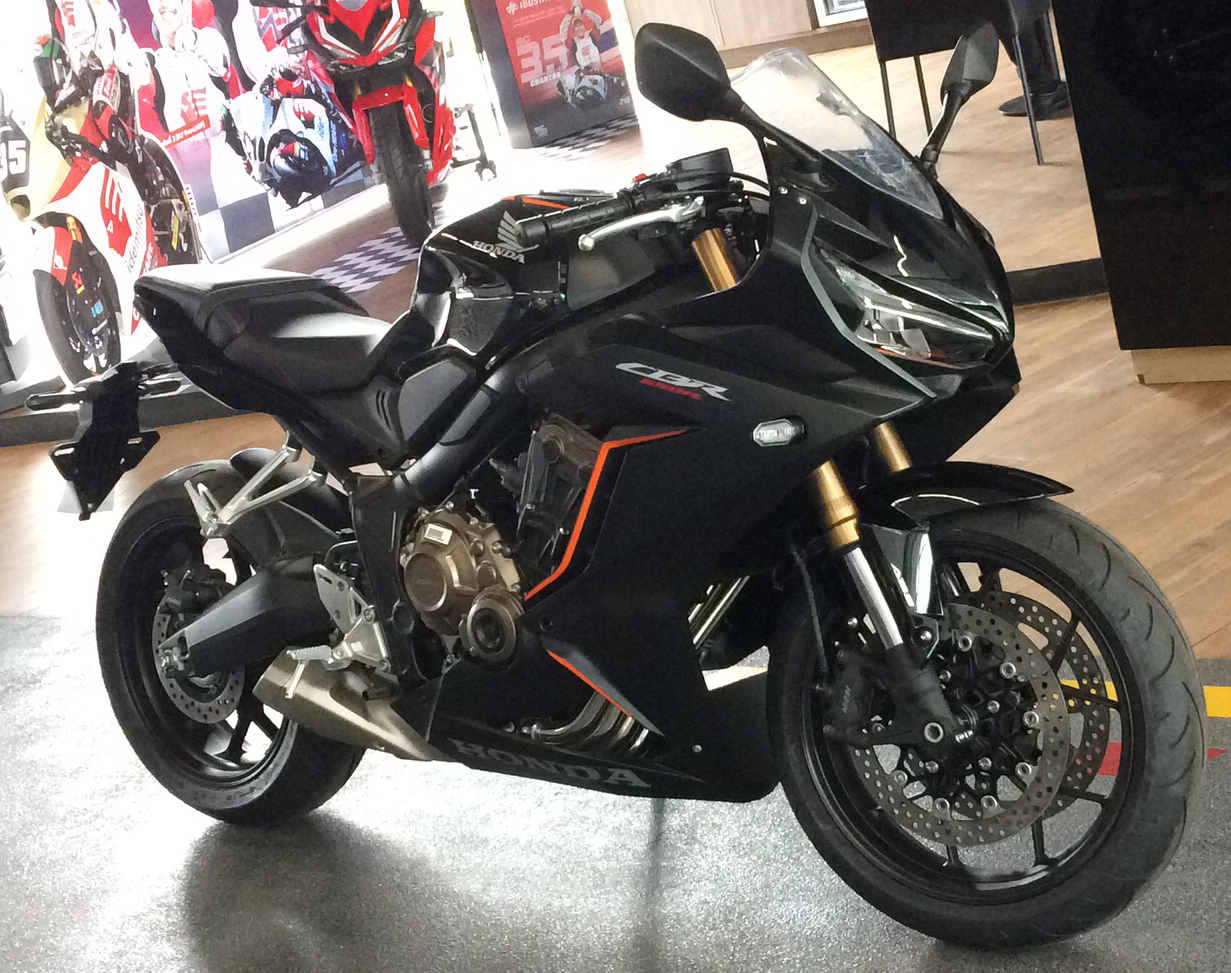
2021 CBR650R

The model change for the 650s - Neo Sports Café - brought them stylistically in line with the CB125R, CB300R, and CB1000R. The CBR650R sport bike also gets the Fireblade style fairing and dual front lamps; rigid lighter frame, updated frame geometry, inverted Showa separate function front fork (SFF), the clip-on fork has moved to a lower position under the upper triple clamp, lighter cast Y-spoke aluminum wheels that is look the same to the Fireblade, radial mounted front brake calipers pair with the 320mm drilled disk, ABS standard, updated air intake with dual ram air under the front lamp and larger exhaust pipe & muffler, closer ratio gearing, flatter torque, higher red-line, assist slipper clutch, Honda Selectable Torque Control (HSTC) (working with ABS sensor), full LED lighting, integrated LCD dashboard, gear indicator, shift light, Quick Shifter(shift up) System (Optional), rear seat crowl (Optional).

=== 2021 "CB650R/CBR650R" (RH03) ===
With Euro 5 emissions regulation Honda has Camshaft and engine mapping revise, Minor styling updates including the LCD dashboard angle and illumination, Showa SFF-BP (separate function front fork big piston), new tail section fairing and license plate holder, new crankcase cover (still bronze color), revised cycle geometry and ergonomics.

=== 2024 "CB650R/CBR650R" (RH17) ===
Revised styling with additional features including new TFT display, and Honda also revealed their new E-Clutch technology offering standard version and E-Clutch equipped version on these models.

== Specifications ==
All specifications are manufacturer claimed unless otherwise specified.

Year	2013-2016 (RC74)		2017-2018 (RC96)		2019-2020 (RH01)		2021–2023 (RH03)		2024–Present (RH17)	
Model	CB650F	CBR650F	CB650F	CBR650F	CB650R	CBR650R	CB650R	CBR650R	CB650R	CBR650R
Type	Naked	Sport	Naked	Sport	Naked	Sport	Naked	Sport	Naked	Sport
Engine	Four stroke, inline-4, DOHC, 16 valves, liquid-cooled									
Displacement	648 cc (39.5 cu in)									
Bore x stroke	67 mm × 46 mm (2.6 in × 1.8 in)									
Compression ratio	11.4 : 1				11.6 : 1					
Fuel delivery	Honda PGM-FI									
Ignition	Fully transistorized with ignition advance CR9EH-9 (NGK) or U27FER9 (DENSO)				Fully transistorized with ignition advance IMR9E-9HES (NGK) or VUH27ES (DENSO)					
Maximum power	61 kW (82 hp) at 9,500 rpm		66 kW (89 hp) at 11,000 rpm		70 kW (94 hp) at 12,000 rpm					
Maximum torque	63 N⋅m (46 lbf⋅ft) at 8,000 rpm		64 N⋅m (47 lbf⋅ft) at 8,000 rpm		64 N⋅m (47 lbf⋅ft) at 8,500 rpm		63 N⋅m (46 lbf⋅ft) at 8,500 rpm			
Transmission	6-speed sequential, constant mesh									
Clutch	Wet, multi-plate, coil spring				Wet, multi-plate, coil spring, assist slipper					
Chain & Sprocket	525 o-ring chain, 118 links (DID 525V11 or RK 525KRW) Front 15T Rear 42T									
Gear ratios
1	3.071				3.071					
2	2.235				2.352					
3	1.777				1.888					
4	1.520				1.560					
5	1.333				1.370					
6	1.214				1.214					
Final drive	1.690/2.800									
Frame	Tubular steel, diamond, stressed engine									
Rake	25.5°									
Trail	101 mm (4.0 in)									
Turning radius	2,800 mm (110 in)	3,000 mm (120 in)	2,800 mm (110 in)	3,000 mm (120 in)	2,800 mm (110 in)	3,000 mm (120 in)	2,800 mm (110 in)	3,000 mm (120 in)	2,800 mm (110 in)	3,000 mm (120 in)
Front wheel	17M/C × MT3.50 cast aluminium									
Rear wheel	17M/C × MT5.50 cast aluminium									
Front tyre	120/70 ZR17 58W									
Rear tyre	180/55 ZR17 73W									
Front brake	Dual 320 mm (13 in) fixed petal discs, Axial mount 2 pistons Nissin sliding calipers with ABS		Dual 320 mm (13 in) fixed petal discs, Axial mount 2 pistons Nissin sliding calipers (revise model) with ABS		Dual 310 mm (12 in) semi-floating discs, Radial mount 4 pistons Nissin calipers with ABS					
Rear brake	Single 240 mm (9.4 in) fixed (F model with petal disc), 1 piston Nissin sliding caliper with ABS									
Front suspension	Non-adjustable 41 mm (1.6 in) Conventional Telescopic Fork		Non-adjustable 41 mm (1.6 in) Conventional Telescopic Showa Dual Bending Valve (SDBV)		Non-adjustable 41 mm (1.6 in) Inverted Showa Separate Function Fork (SFF)		Non-adjustable 41 mm (1.6 in) Inverted Showa Separate Function Fork Big Piston (SFF-BP)			
Rear suspension	Single shock, 7-stage preload adjustable; cast aluminium double-sided swingarm				Single shock, 10-stage preload adjustable; cast aluminium double-sided swingarm					
Front suspension travel	108 mm (4.3 in)									
Rear suspension travel	128 mm (5.0 in)									
Wheelbase	1,450 mm (57 in)									
Overall length	2,110 mm (83 in)				2,145 mm (84.4 in)					
Overall width	780 mm (31 in)	755 mm (29.7 in)	780 mm (31 in)	755 mm (29.7 in)	780 mm (31 in)	750 mm (30 in)	780 mm (31 in)	750 mm (30 in)	780 mm (31 in)	750 mm (30 in)
Overall height	1,120 mm (44 in)	1,145 mm (45.1 in)	1,075 mm (42.3 in)	1,145 mm (45.1 in)	1,075 mm (42.3 in)	1,150 mm (45 in)	1,075 mm (42.3 in)	1,150 mm (45 in)	1,075 mm (42.3 in)	1,150 mm (45 in)
Seat height	810 mm (32 in)									
Ground clearance	150 mm (5.9 in)	130 mm (5.1 in)	150 mm (5.9 in)	130 mm (5.1 in)	150 mm (5.9 in)	132 mm (5.2 in)	150 mm (5.9 in)	132 mm (5.2 in)	150 mm (5.9 in)	132 mm (5.2 in)
Fuel tank capacity	17.3 L (3.8 imp gal; 4.6 US gal)				15.4 L (3.4 imp gal; 4.1 US gal)					
Engine oil	SAE 10w-30, JASO T 903 standard : MA 2.9 L (2.6 imp qt) (draining) 3.5 L (3.1 imp qt) (disassembly)				SAE 10w-30, JASO T 903 standard : MA 2.3 L (2.0 imp qt) (draining) 3.0 L (2.6 imp qt) (disassembly)					
Coolant	2.5 L (2.2 imp qt) Pro Honda HP Coolant									
Wet weight (abs Version)	208 kg (459 lb)	212 kg (467 lb)	208 kg (459 lb)	213 kg (470 lb)	203 kg (448 lb)	208 kg (459 lb)	202 kg (445 lb)	207 kg (456 lb)	205 kg (452 lb) for Standard 207 kg (456 lb) for E-Clutch	209 kg (461 lb) for Standard 211 kg (465 lb) for E-Clutch
Maximum weight capacity	188 kg (414 lb)				128 kg (282 lb)					
Fuel consumption	30 km/L (85 mpg_{‑imp}; 71 mpg_{‑US})									
