= Honda CB1100F =

CB1100F
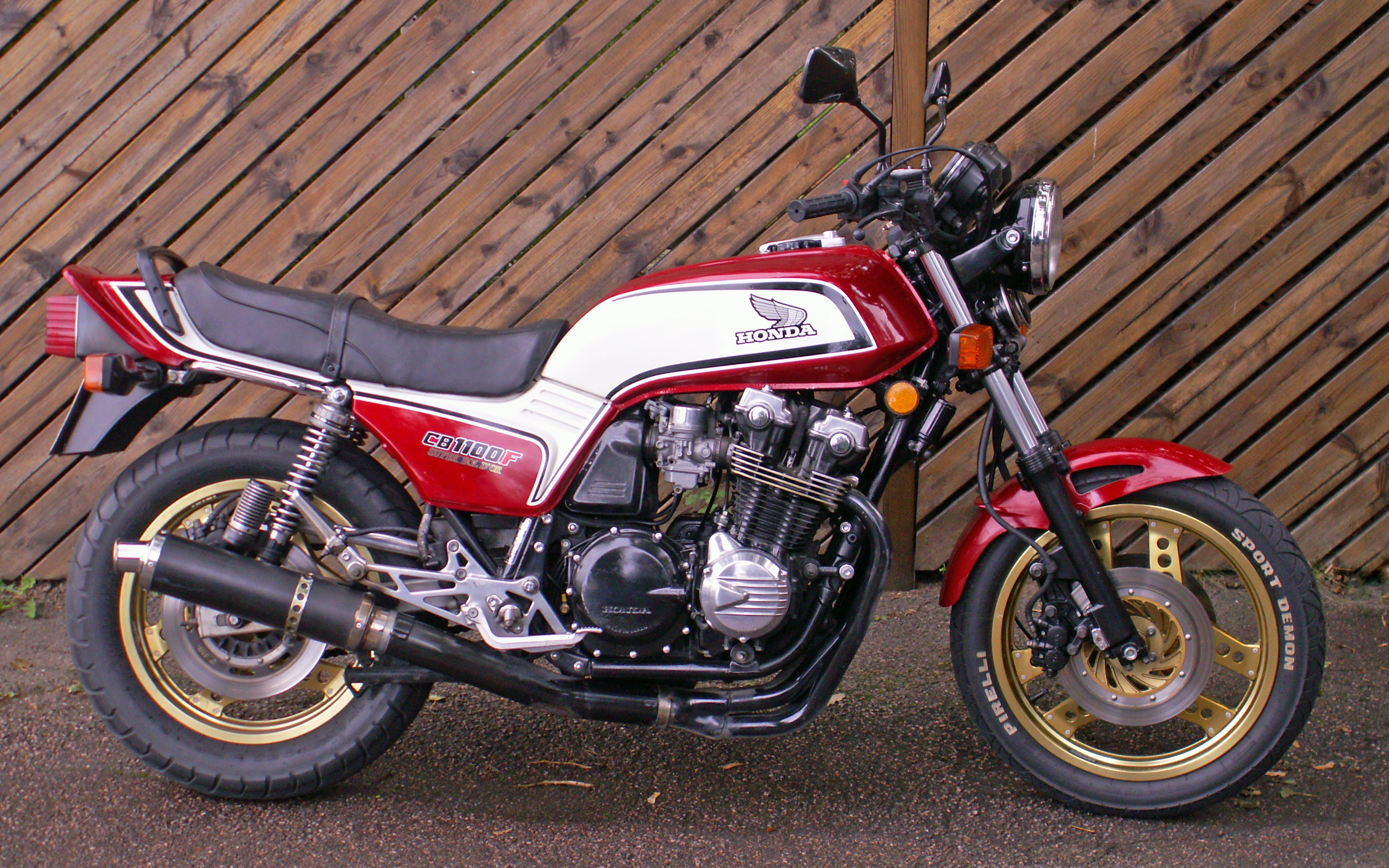
- Manufacturer: Honda
- Production: 1983
- Predecessor: Honda CB900F
- Successor: Honda CB1000
- Class: Standard
- Engine: Air-cooled inline 4-cyl, 4-stroke, double overhead camshafts (DOHC), four valves/cylinder
- Bore / stroke: 70 mm × 69 mm
- Compression ratio: 9.7:1
- Top speed: 225 km/h (139 mph)
- Power: 77 kW (108 hp) (limited to 73.5 kW, (100 hp) at 8500 rpm on European market)
- Torque: 97 N⋅m/7500 rpm
- Ignition type: Electronic
- Transmission: 5 speed
- Frame type: tubular frame
- Brakes: double disc front, single rear
- Tires: Front 100/90V18
- Rake, trail: Rear 130/90V17
- Wheelbase: 1520 mm
- Dimensions: L: 2260 mm W: 805 mm H: 1125 mm
- Seat height: 795 mm
- Weight: 243 kg (dry)
- Fuel capacity: 20 liter
- Related: CB1100R, CB900F

The Honda CB1100F is a standard motorcycles that was made only in 1983 by Honda, based on their line of DOHC air-cooled inline four engines. It was succeeded by the Honda CB1000.

== History ==
In 1979 Honda produced a double overhead cam (DOHC) 750 cc engine developing 72 bhp @ 9000 rpm which was used in the CB750F model in the US from 1979 to 1982. The same year Honda also released the CB900F using a race-bred 901 cc DOHC engine that was a step above the CB750 with its longer stroke and hotter cams squeezing out 95 bhp @ 8500 rpm (actual rear-wheel horsepower exceeded 80 horsepower as measured on a dynamometer). The CB900F was only offered in the US from 1980 to 1982.

In 1983 Honda released the CB1100F, based on the CB900F and the CB1100R. Besides a distinctive-to-the-1100F paint scheme, it used hotter cams, larger pistons, better carburetion in the form of four Keihin 34 mm CV, and a redesigned combustion chamber. The CB1100F produced 108 bhp @ 8500 rpm.

It also had increased rake and the dash featured a 150 mph or 240 km/h speedometer and adjustable two-piece handlebars. The tubeless-tire wheels were new also, 18-inch x 2.50-inch front and 17-inch x 3-inch rear. Performance was pace setting. Cycle World tests at 11.13 seconds/120.48 mph quarter mile and 141 mph half mile earned it the designation of "fastest stock bike ever tested".

The CB1100F was available in different markets, such as US, Canada, Europe, and Australia from 1982 through 1984. In the US, a quarter-fairing for wind deflection (and looks), and cast single piece wheels were offered. The other markets had not the fairing, and the wheels were gold "boomerang" Comstars, similar to the ones on the Honda CB1100R, and the control cables were routed above, rather than below, the handlebars. The riding position was more sporty than the US model, with rearset footpegs and controls as well as lower two-piece clip-on handlebars. These different parts were originally offered through US dealers as a complete sport, or "continental" kit, and now command a price premium in the US as owners seek to upgrade their machines.
