= Honda CB900F =

Motorcycle

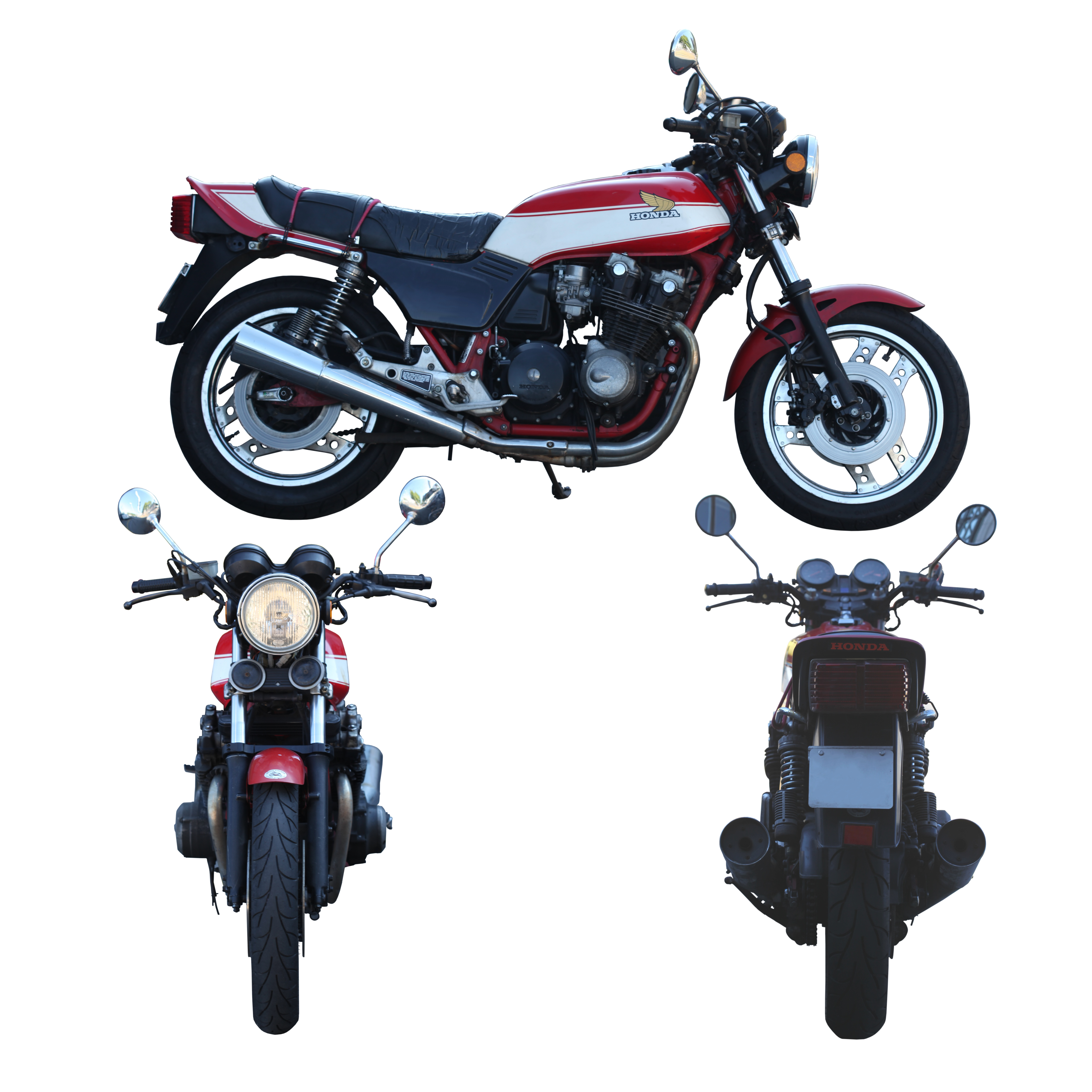
Honda CB 900 F

The Honda CB900F is a Honda motorcycle made from 1979 through 1983. It was a typical sport-adjacent Universal Japanese Motorcycle of the time, using a straight four-cylinder four-stroke 900 cc (55 cu in) engine with carburetors.

The motorbike was produced from 1979 through 1983, and was available in the United States in 1981 and 1982. In 1983 it was replaced by the CB1100F.

== Honda CB 900 F ==
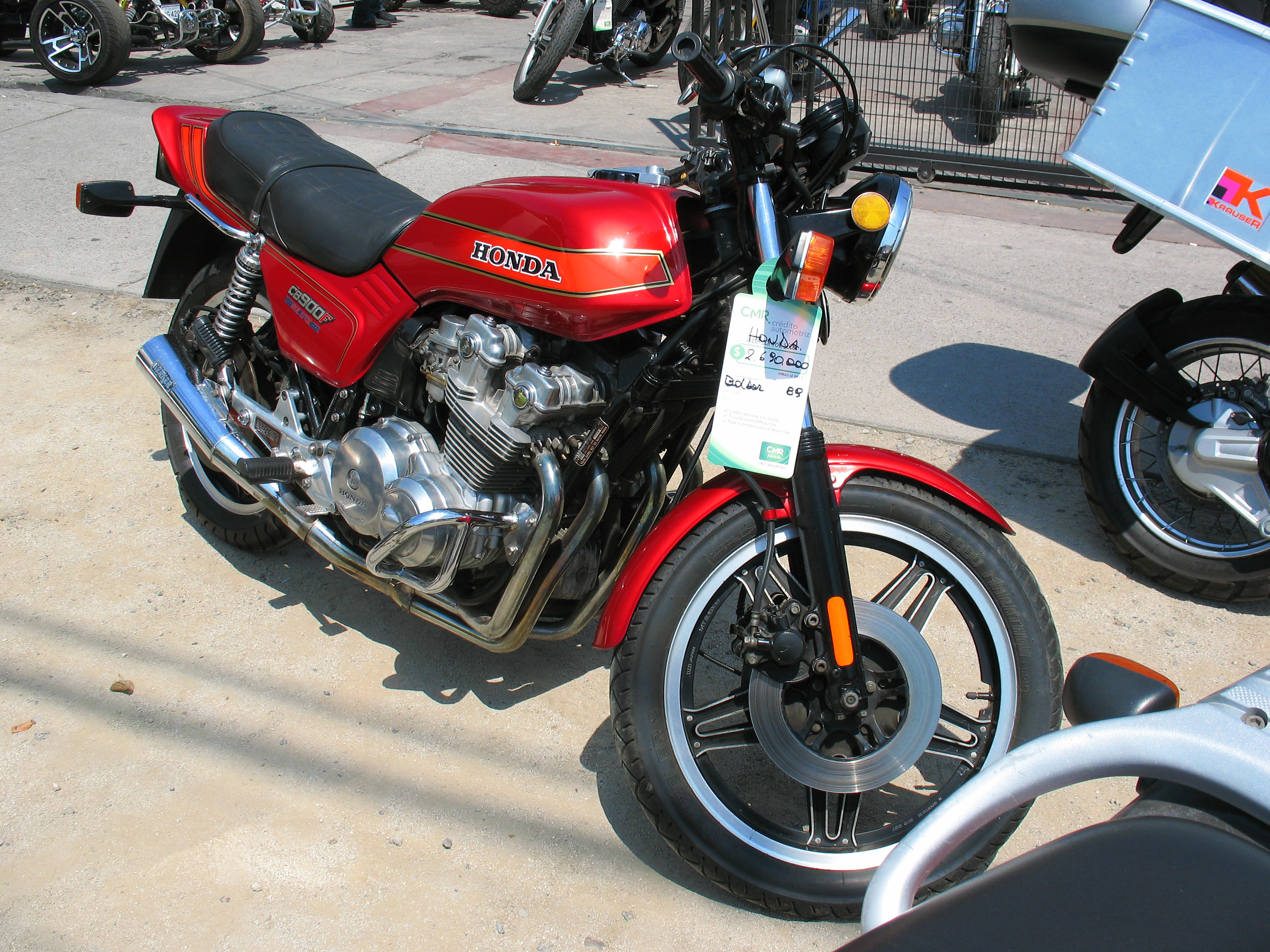
- Manufacturer: Honda
- Production: 1979–1983
- Successor: CB1100F
- Engine: Air-cooled four-stroke 901 cc (55.0 cu in) DOHC straight-four
- Bore / stroke: 64.5 mm × 69.0 mm (2.54 in × 2.72 in)
- Compression ratio: 8.8:1
- Top speed: 190 km/h (120 mph) (1979–1981), 210 km/h (130 mph) (1982) 217 km/h (135 mph)
- Power: 71 kW (95 hp) at 9,000 rpm
- Torque: 7.9 kgf⋅m (77 N⋅m; 57 lbf⋅ft)
- Ignition type: Electric start
- Transmission: Wet, multi-plate clutch, 5-speed manual, chain final drive
- Frame type: Steel twin downtube
- Suspension: Front: Air-assisted telescopic forks 160 mm (6.4 in) travel, Honda TRAC anti-dive fork from 1982/83; Rear: twin shocks 110 mm (4.3 in) travel, adj. compression, damping, rebound
- Brakes: Front: 2 × 270 mm (10.7 in) disc Rear: 290 mm (11.5 in) disc Dual piston calipers on all after 1983
- Tires: Bridgestone Mag Mopus. Front: 3.25"×19" (100/90-19); Rear:4"×18" (130/80-18)
- Rake, trail: 27.5°, 115 mm (4.5 in)
- Wheelbase: 1,515 mm (59.6 in)
- Dimensions: L: 2,240 mm (88 in); W: 805 mm (31.7 in)
- Seat height: 815 mm (32.1 in)
- Weight: 233 kg (514 lb) 241 kg (531 lb) (after 1982), or 234 kilograms (516 lb) (dry); 258 kg (568 lb) (1/2 fuel) (wet)
- Fuel capacity: 20 L (4.4 imp gal; 5.3 US gal)
- Fuel consumption: 5.0 L/100 km; 56 mpg_{‑imp} (47 mpg_{‑US})
- Related: CB750, CB900C

=== Background ===
In 1969 Honda introduced its flagship CB750 superbike, whose success led to Honda's domination of the motorcycle market. Honda had been successful in European endurance racing with their RCB-series RS1000, and had made advances in suspension technology from their experience in motocross, and the company chose to base a new DOHC roadster on their endurance racer.

The CB900F's design was aimed at European markets, rather than the usual focus on the United States, where it was not available until 1981. In Europe, it was initially named Super Sport like the 750 (FZ and FA) later named after the Bol d'Or endurance race. In the market, the CB900F competed with larger capacity bikes like the Kawasaki Kz1000, Suzuki GS1000, and Yamaha XS1100.

=== Design ===
The CB900F's engine has a 901 cc (55.0 cu in) four-cylinder DOHC engine with a bore and stroke of 64.5 by 69.0 mm (2.54 by 2.72 in). The engine drew on other designs, such as the CB1000C, CB1100F/CB1100R, and the inline-6 CBX1000. The CB900F has a five-speed gearbox and chain final drive, and it produces 71 kW (95 bhp) at 9,000 rpm The CB900F has two front disc brakes and one rear disk brake, all fitted with dual-piston calipers after 1983. The air-assisted fork was fitted with the Honda TRAC (torque reactive anti-dive control) anti-dive system in 1982 or 1983. The bike shares the same bodywork (tank, side covers, tailpiece) as the earlier CB750F Super Sport. There are similarities between the CB900F bodywork and that of the CB1100F and CBX.

=== Performance ===
In magazine tests, the CB900F typically clocked low to mid 12 seconds in the quarter mile (and a low 11.84 seconds in a Motorcyclist magazine test). The engine was tuned to produce mid range power rather than maximizing peak horsepower, thus giving good acceleration from 4,000 rpm to the 9,500 rpm redline. At 140 km/h (90 mph) there was some vibration, but the relaxed riding position was comfortable at most speeds, but at the 210 km/h (130 mph) maximum speed wind pressure could cause rider discomfort. The CB900F was succeeded in 1983 by the CB1100F, and in 1987 Honda introduced the CBR1000F water-cooled inline fours.

=== Reception ===
Honda's advertising proclaimed the bike to be "a thundering Super-Sports bike with devastating performance and an unwavering stamina". The bike's conventional twin down-tube steel frame is very strong. This, along with improved suspension made the CB900F "arguably the best Honda had built for the street," and capable of challenging European motorcycles in performance and roadholding. For its time, the CB900F was called, "the ultimate statement of the old air-cooled technology Honda had done so much to create". In anticipation of the 2002 model, one reporter reminisced that the original "was a powerful machine, if a bit heavy. All gas tank and engine, stable on the highway, middle-of-the-road good looks and hound-dog reliable." Rod Ker, however, writes that it had "two bad habits," that "it dropped out of gear, and — sometimes as a direct result — broke con-rods. This was a great pity, because it was a good bike until it broke, blessed with a frame and suspension that showed the Japanese were catching up with the Europeans in chassis technology."

== See also ==
- Honda CB900F Hornet
- Honda CB900C
- Honda Hornet (disambiguation)
