= List of vehicles used by the Garda Síochána =

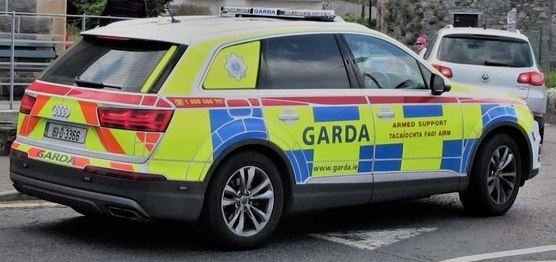
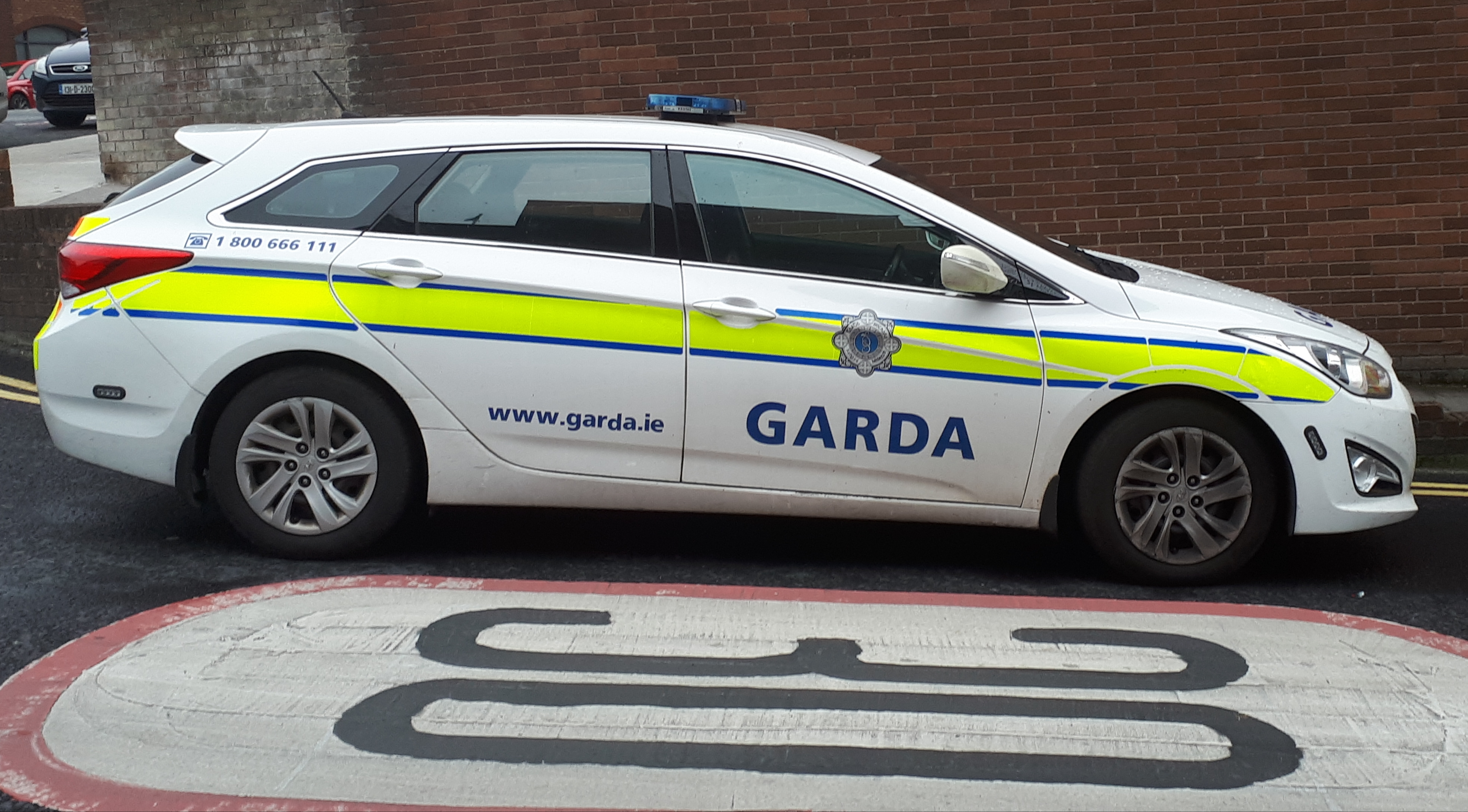
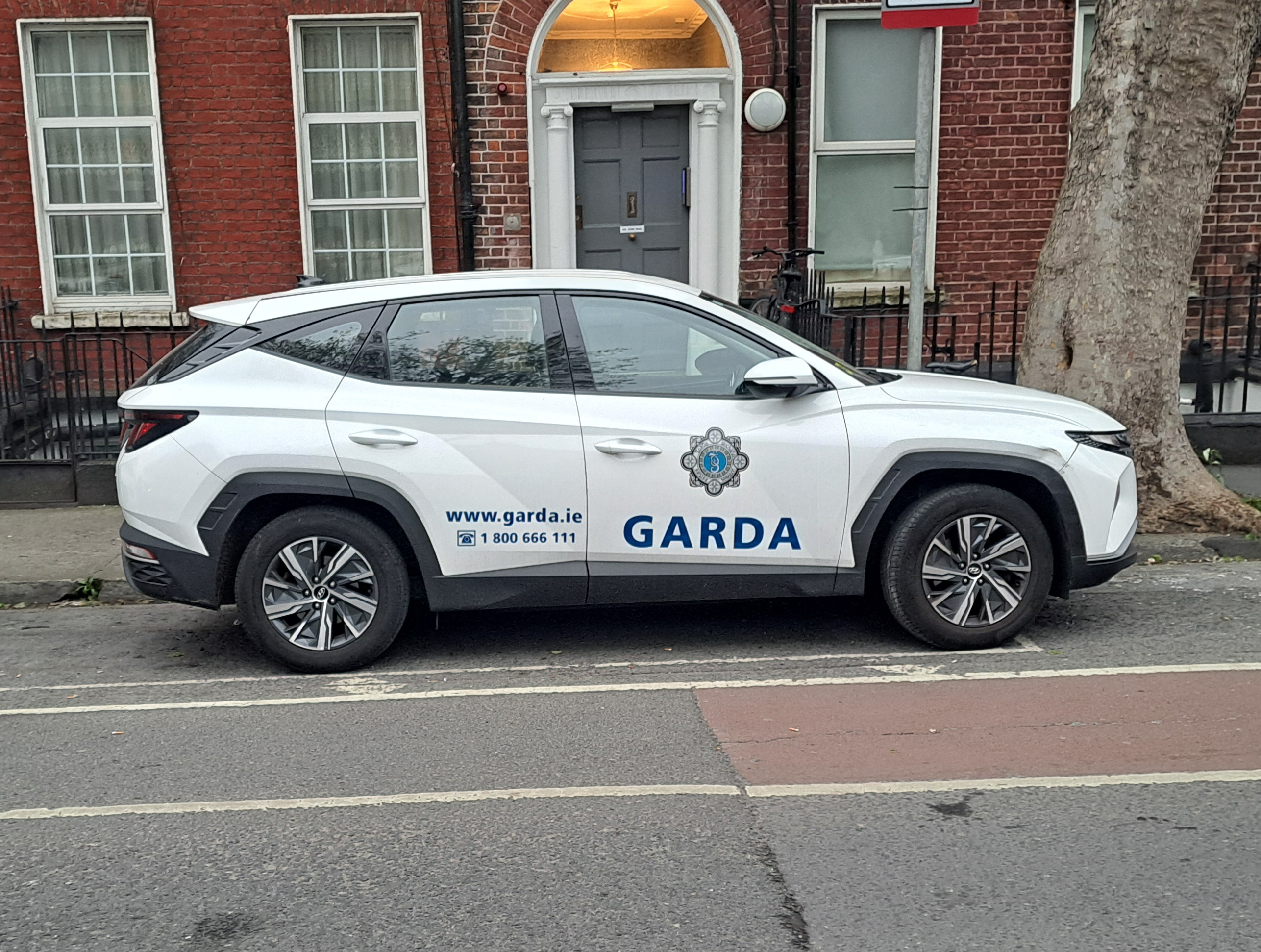
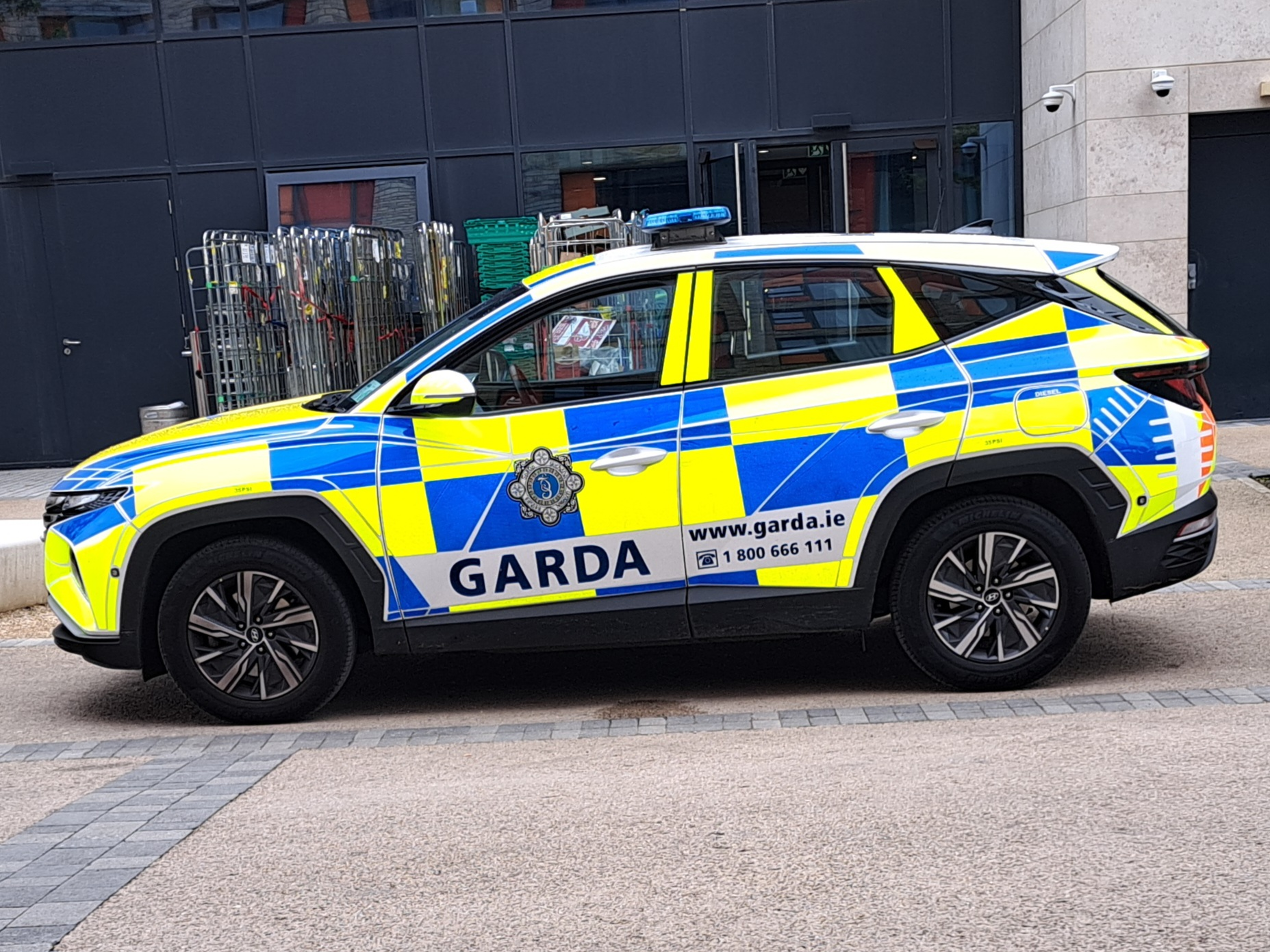
Various liveries used on Garda Síochána vehicles

This is a list of vehicles used by the Garda Síochána. Vehicles used by the Garda Síochána are mainly white, with yellow and blue fluorescent livery. Roads Policing unit (formerly traffic corps) vehicles are typically adorned with a battenburg pattern. The Garda insignia is also present on vehicles.

As of 28 February 2025, the Garda Síochána's fleet of 3,668 vehicles was made up of 2,712 cars (1,085 marked and 1,627 unmarked), 640 vans, 162 motorcycles, 97 four-wheel drive vehicles, and 57 other types. The fleet is managed by the Garda Fleet management Section.

In 2020, during the COVID-19 pandemic in the Republic of Ireland, the Garda Síochána hired approximately 200 vehicles to use for community outreach, to collect prescriptions, and to bring isolated and vulnerable people to medical appointments.

== Cars ==
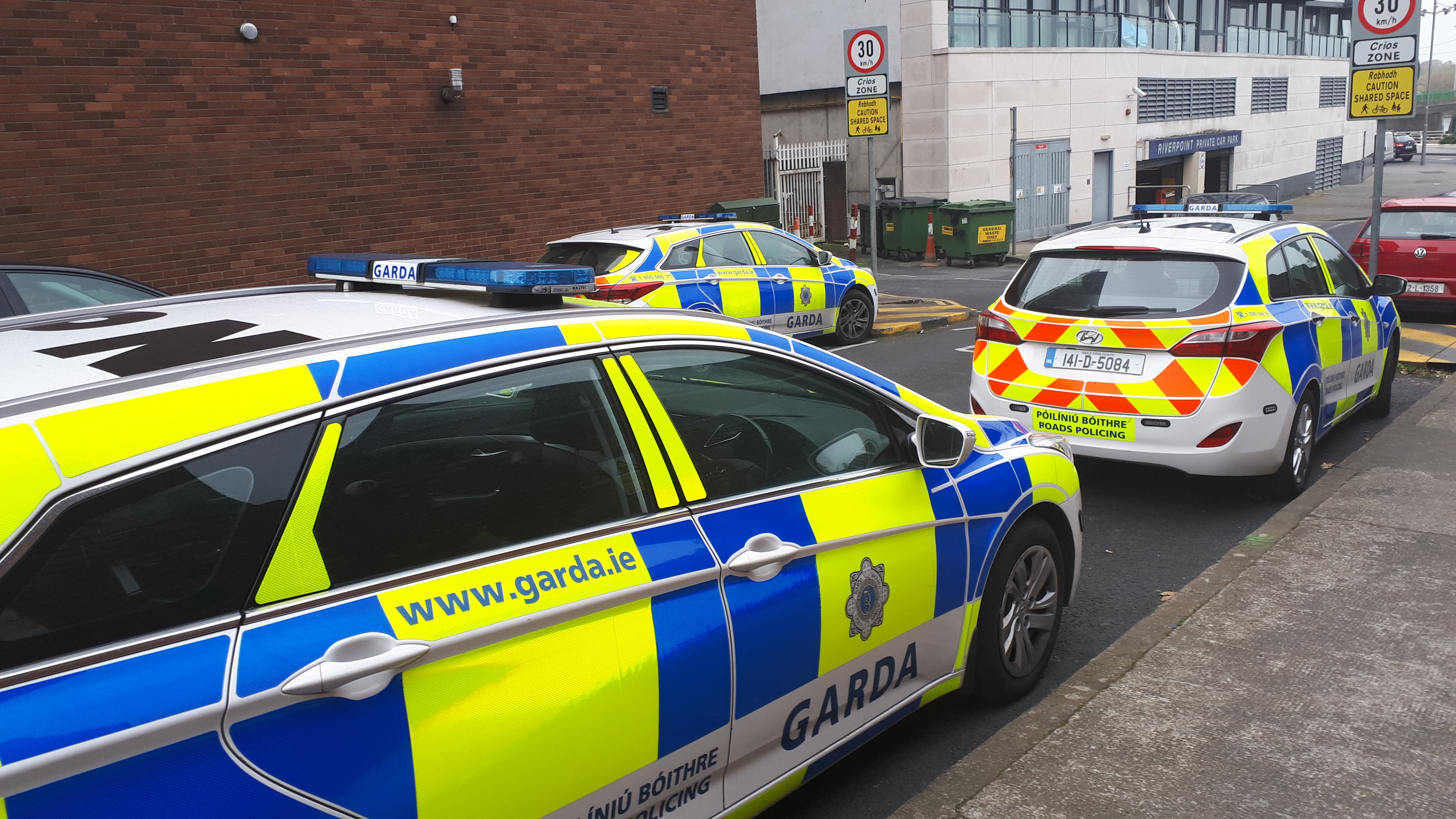
Garda cars

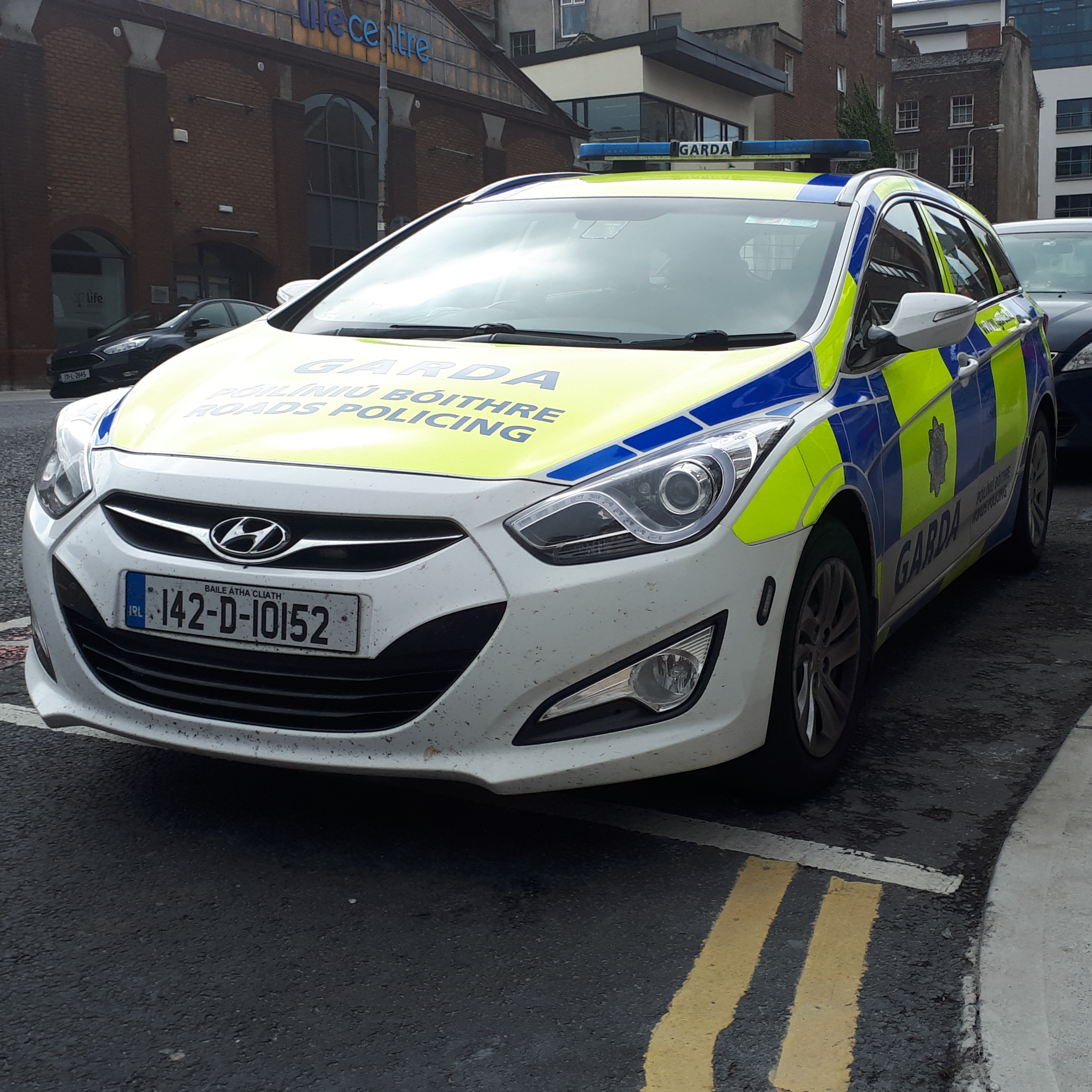
Roads Policing Unit Hyundai i40

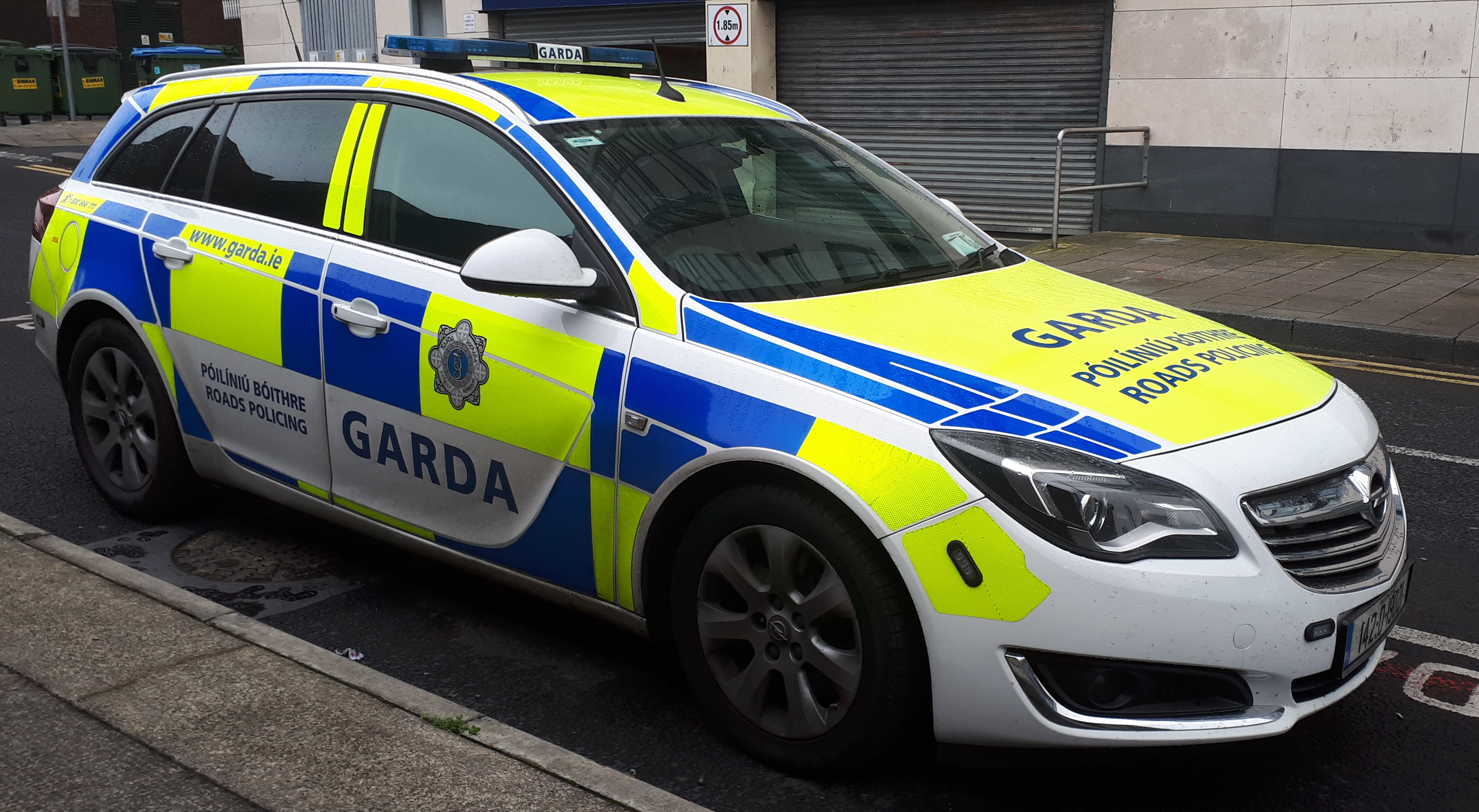
Opel insignia tourer

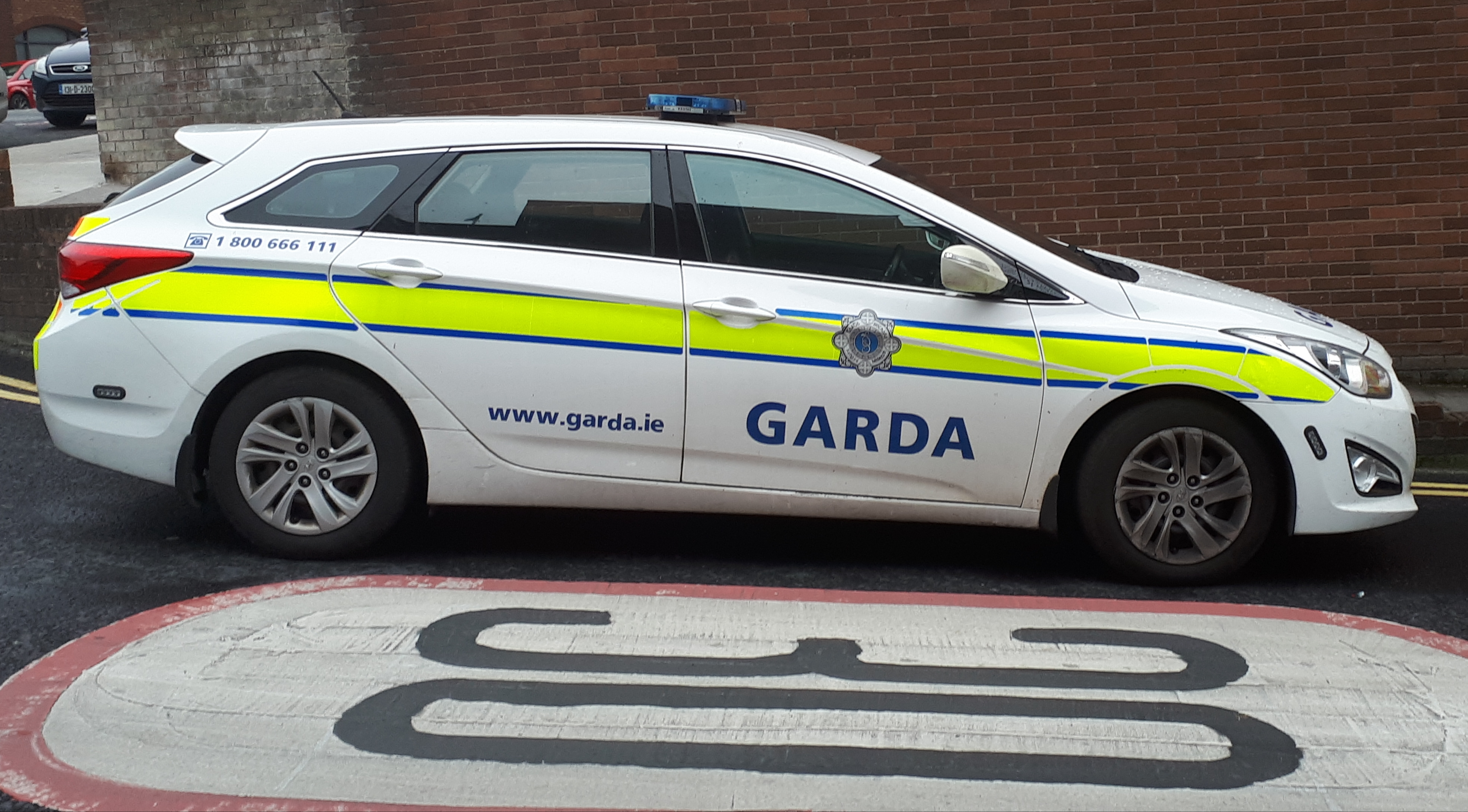
Garda Hyundai i40 patrol car

=== Marked patrol cars ===
- BMW 5 Series
- Ford Mondeo
- Ford Focus
- Ford Fiesta
- Opel Astra
- Opel Vectra
- Hyundai i30
- Hyundai Kona
- Hyundai Tucson
- Toyota Avensis
- Toyota Corolla
- Hyundai i40
- Volvo XC70
- Toyota RAV4
- Škoda Enyaq
- Kia EV6
- Hyundai Ioniq 5
- Skoda Octavia
- Volkswagen ID.3
- Volkswagen ID.7

=== Unmarked patrol cars ===
- Audi S3
- Audi A6
- BMW 5 Series
- Ford Focus
- Opel Vectra
- Hyundai i30
- Hyundai Ioniq 5
- Mercedes CLS
- Toyota Avensis
- Toyota Corolla
- Toyota Camry
- Hyundai i40
- Skoda Superb
- Skoda Kodiaq
- Skoda Octavia
- Volvo V60
- Volkswagen Golf R
- Volkswagen Golf GTI
- Hyundai Tucson

== 4x4 ==
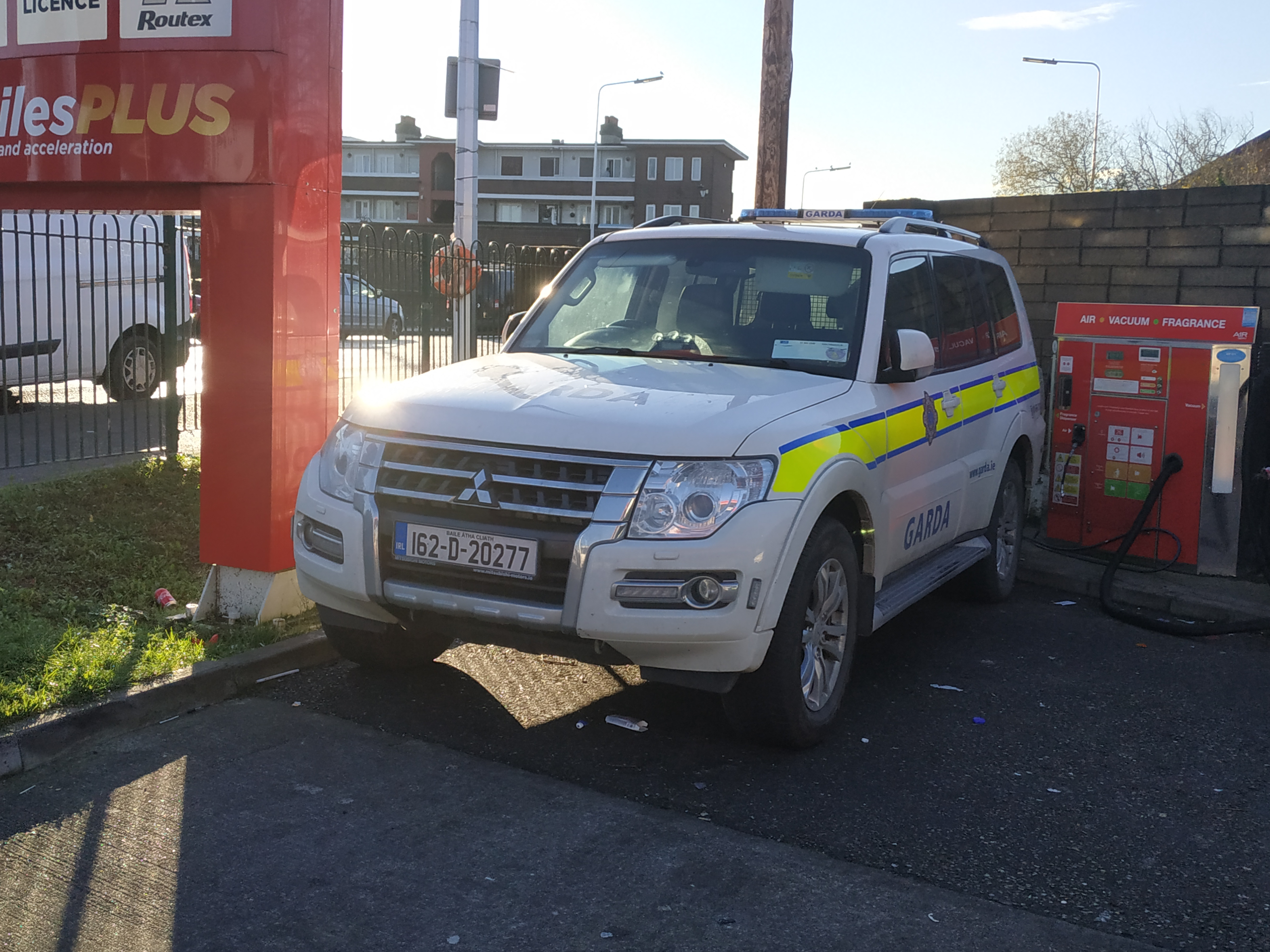
Garda Mitsubishi Pajero

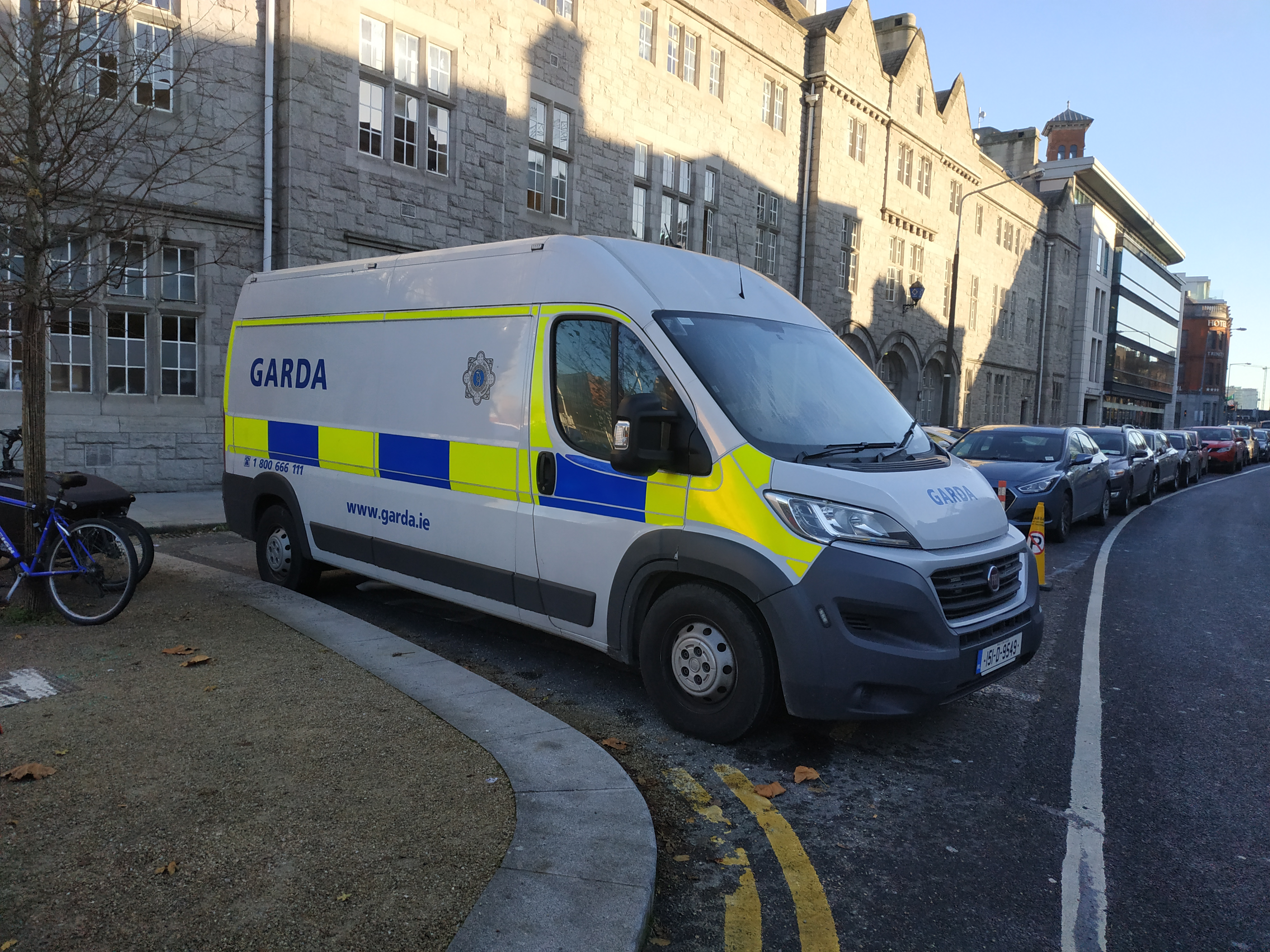
Fiat Ducato

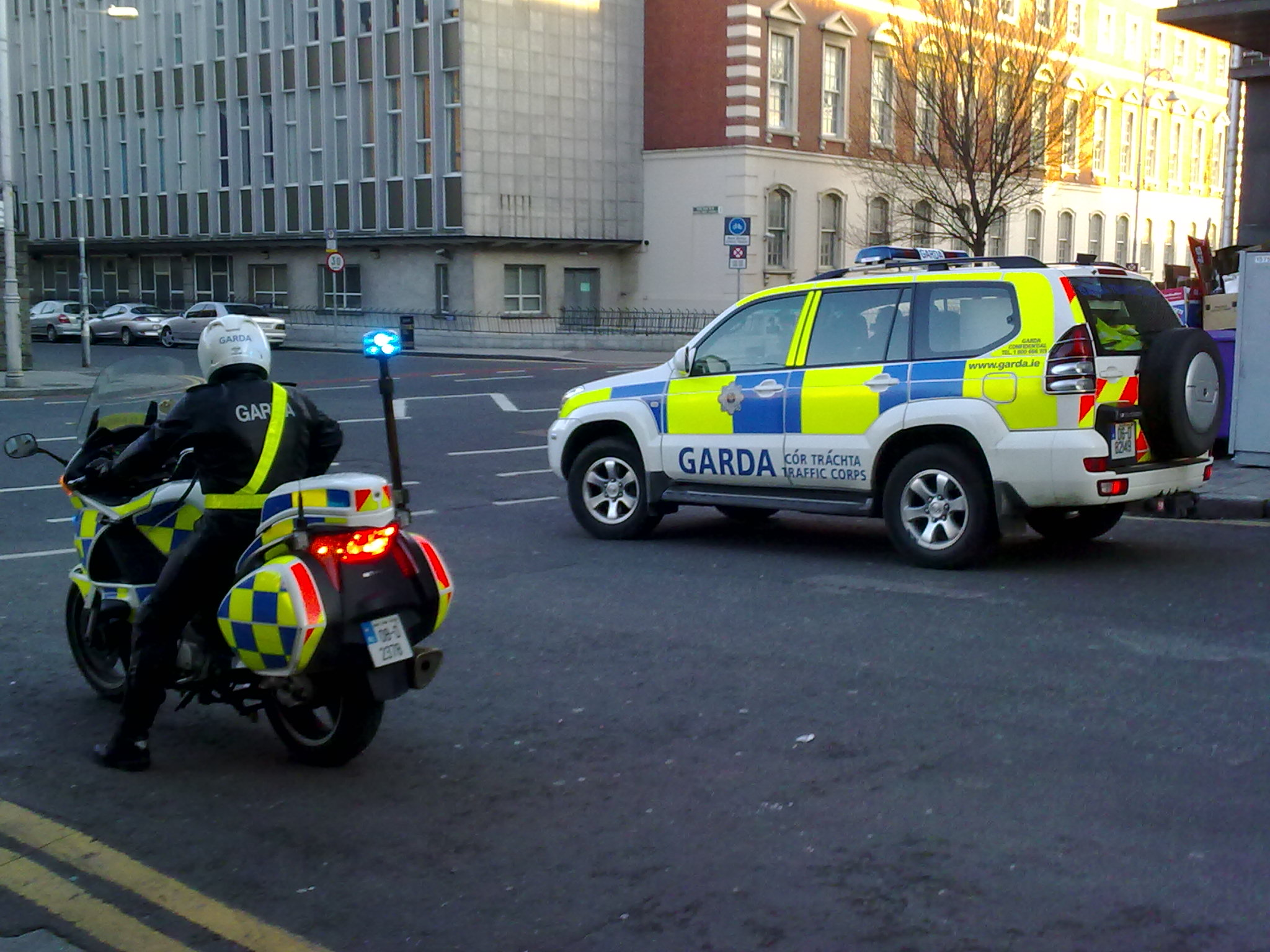
Garda vehicles in Dublin

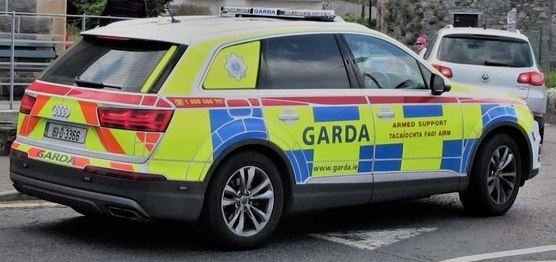
Garda Armed Support Unit Audi Q7

=== Marked 4x4 ===
- Audi Q7
- Toyota Landcruiser
- Land Rover Defender
- Land Rover Discovery
- BMW X5
- Mitsubishi Shogun
- Mitsubishi Pajero
- Ford Ranger
- Hyundai Tucson
- Toyota RAV4

=== Unmarked 4x4 ===
- BMW X5 (armoured)
- Toyota Land Cruiser
- Audi Q7
- Land Rover Discovery
- Range Rover (armoured)
- Isuzu D-Max
- Ford Ranger
- Mitsubishi Outlander
- Hyundai Tucson
- Mitsubishi L200
- Volkswagen Touareg

== Vans and trucks ==
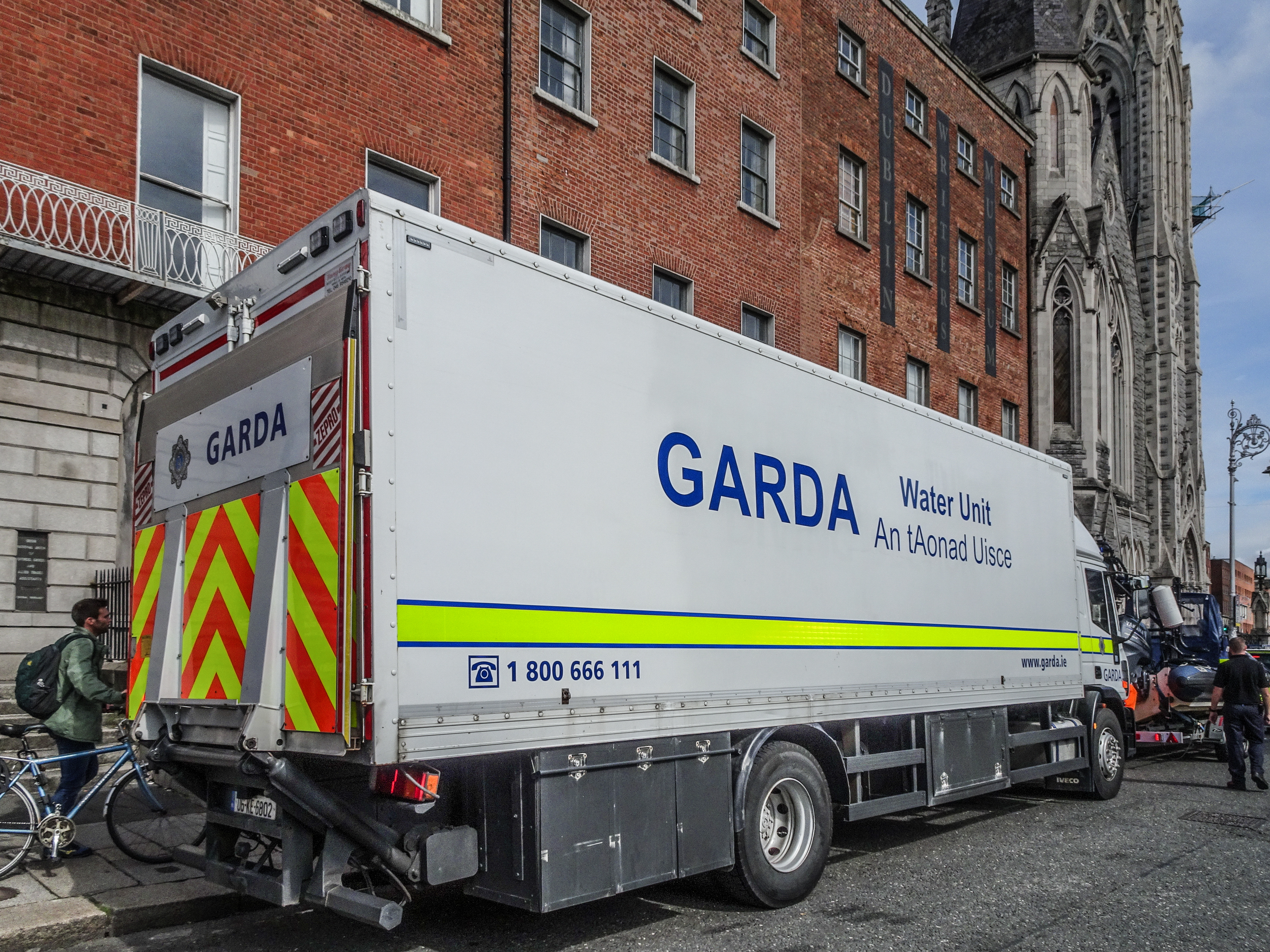
Garda Water Unit Lorry

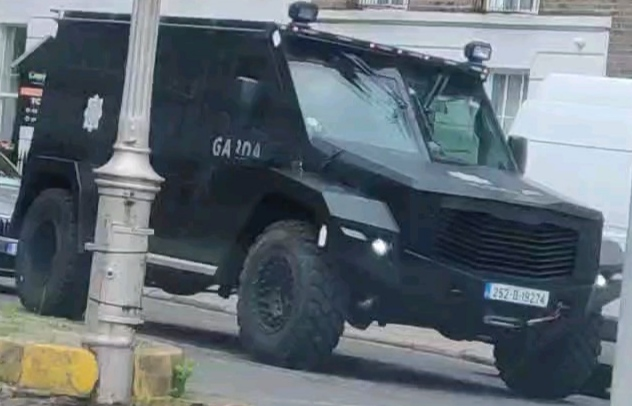
A Garda ERU Stoof armoured tactical truck spotted on Lower Baggot Street, Dublin.

=== Marked vans and trucks ===
- Ford Transit
- Ford Transit Connect
- Fiat Ducato
- Iveco Astra (Public Order Unit water cannon)
- Mercedes-Benz Sprinter (mobile command & control centre)
- Mercedes-Benz Vario (technical bureau)
- Maxus Deliver 9
- Opel Combo
- Scania S-Series (Water Unit)
- Mercedes-Benz Citan
- Stoof Armoured Tactical Truck (purchased in September 2025 for use by the Garda Emergency Response Unit)
- Kia PV5

=== Unmarked vans ===
- Ford Tourneo Custom
- Fiat Doblo
- Ford Transit
- Opel Combo

== Motorcycles ==
- BMW K1200GT
- BMW R1200RT
- BMW F series parallel-twin
- Yamaha FJR1300
- Honda ST1100
- Honda NT700V
- Honda NT650V
- Yamaha Tricity

== Bicycles ==
- Giant

== Aircraft ==
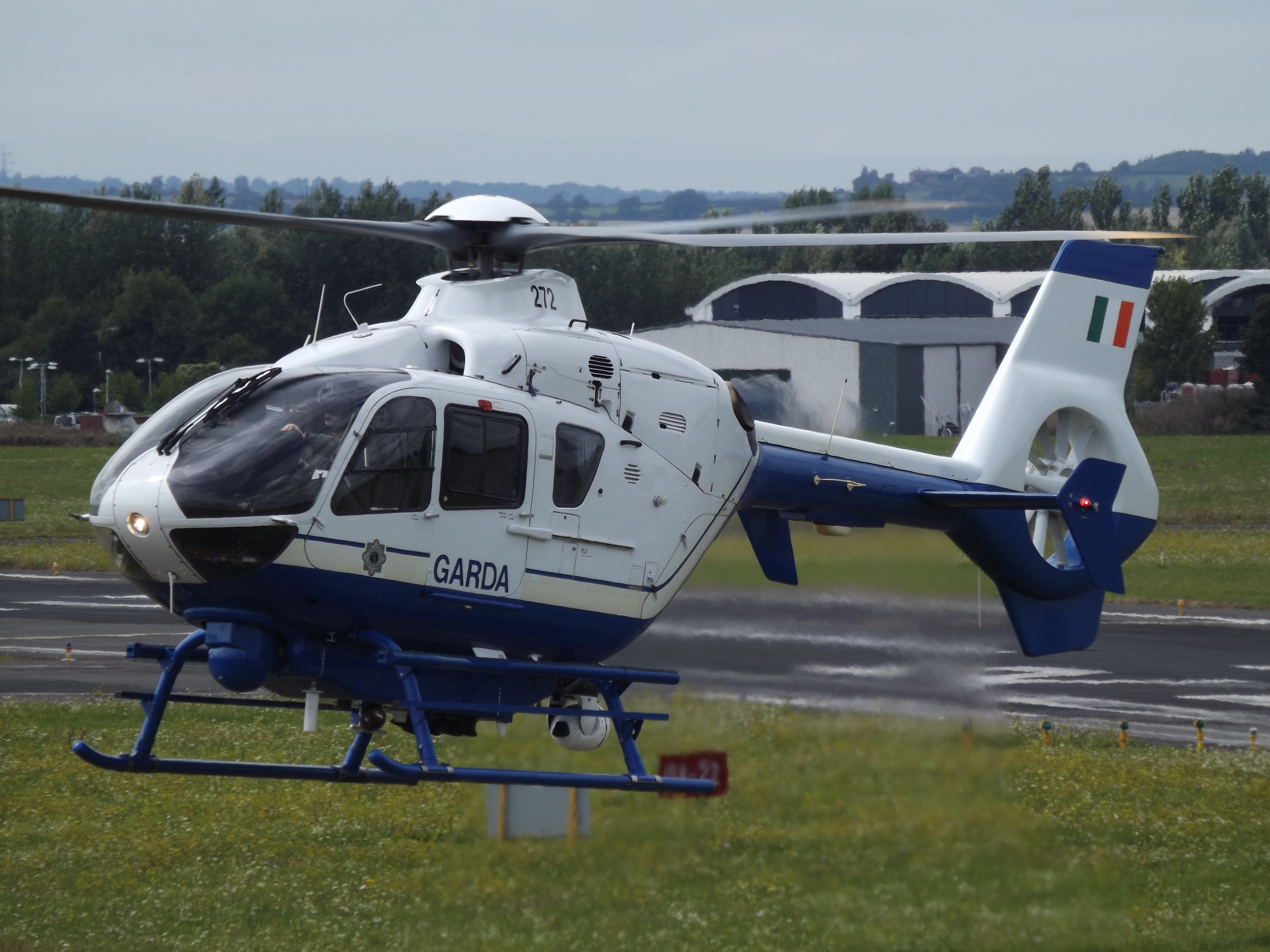
A Garda Eurocopter EC 135 T2

Garda Air Support Unit aircraft are flown and maintained by the No. 3 Operations wing of the Irish Air Corps.

- Viking Series 400 Twin Otter (one); in use since late 2025.
- Eurocopter EC135 T2 (two); due to be replaced by Airbus H145 during 2027.

== Government / official transport ==
- Audi A6
- Audi A8
- BMW 5 Series
- BMW 7 Series
- BMW X5 (Armoured)
- Mercedes-Benz E-Class
- Mercedes-Benz S-Class
- Volvo S60
- Lexus GS
- Lexus LS
