= Honda Pacific Coast =

Honda PC800
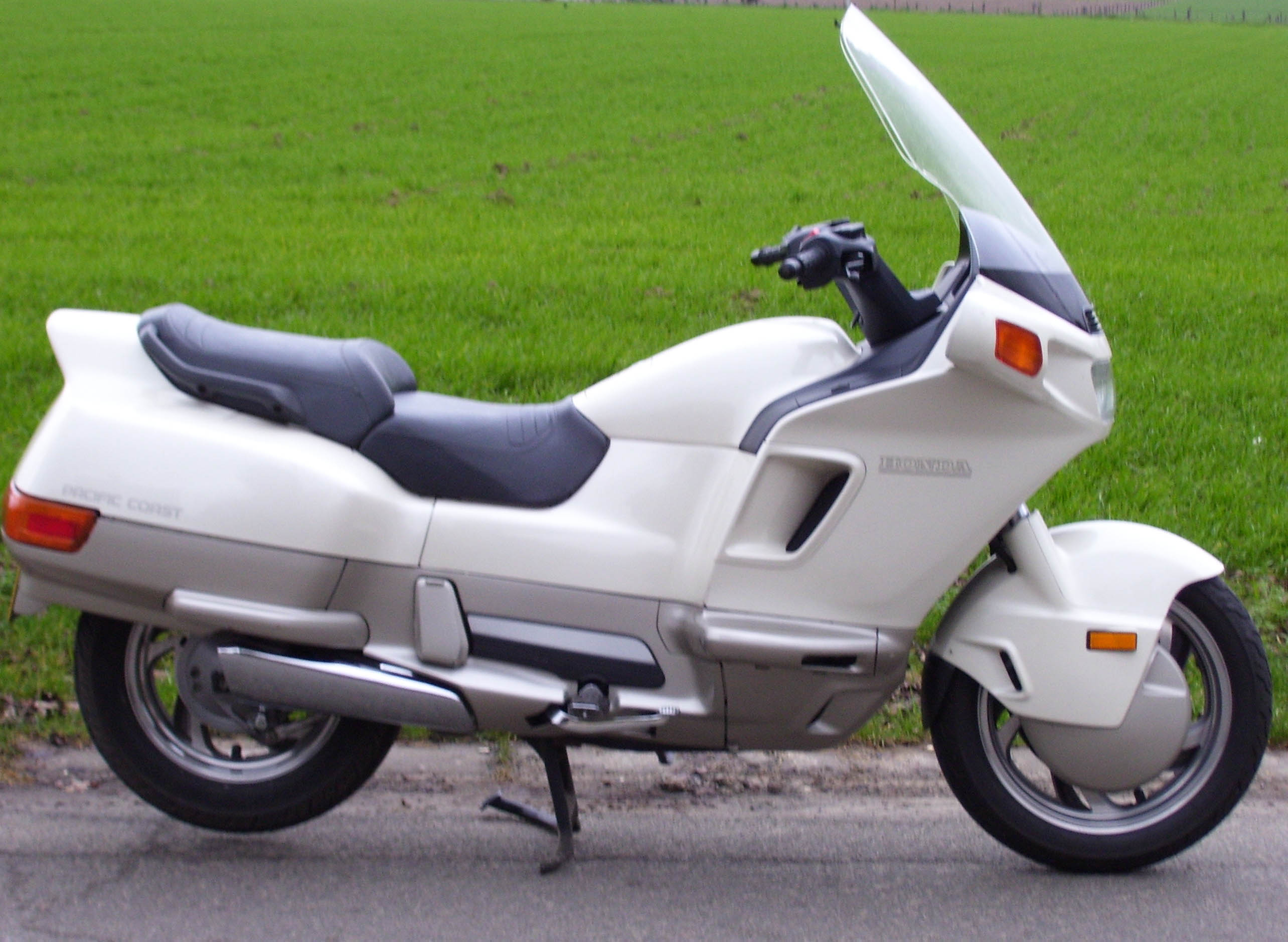
- 1989 Honda Pacific Coast with accessory tall windshield
- Manufacturer: Honda
- Also called: Honda Pacific Coast
- Production: 1989–1998
- Class: Touring
- Engine: 800 cc (49 cu in) 45° 3-valves per cylinder, V-twin, liquid cooled
- Bore / stroke: 79.5 mm × 80.6 mm (3.13 in × 3.17 in)
- Ignition type: CDI
- Transmission: Hydraulic clutch, 5-speed, shaft drive
- Frame type: Steel
- Suspension: Front 42 mm telescopic fork Rear 4-way adjustable spring
- Brakes: Front 2x disc 290 mm, 2 piston calipers Rear drumbrake 180 mm
- Tires: Front 120/80-17; 140/80-15
- Wheelbase: 59.1 inches (1,500 mm)
- Dimensions: H: 1,360 mm (54 in)
- Fuel capacity: 16 L (3.5 imp gal; 4.2 US gal)

The PC800 Pacific Coast is a touring motorcycle manufactured and marketed by Honda between 1989 and 1998. Named after California's Pacific Coast Highway, over 14,000 were sold in North America, Europe and Japan, with a three-year hiatus between two production runs. The bike is noted for its single integrated trunk straddling the rear wheel, full bodywork, and distinctive two-tone paint.

Like the earlier Honda Gold Wing and later Rune, the Pacific Coast had been conceived and designed by Honda Research America specifically for the US market.

Its wheel-straddling, top-opening trunk concept remained unique to the Pacific Coast, as subsequent Honda motorcycles, namely the Deauville/NT700V, ST1100, Gold Wing and ST1300, would feature integral, side-opening trunks.

== An unorthodox motorcycle ==
According to a 1998 Motorcycle.org article, "when the PC debuted, it was considered a radical bike." The PC800 departed convention with its integral trunk, extensive bodywork and marketing aimed at the "white-collar professional."

=== Marketing ===
"For some people, a road is more than just a strip of pavement connecting where they are with where they want to be. It's the reason for leaving home in the first place. The Amalfi Drive in Italy is a road like that. The Blue Ridge Parkway is too.

And so is Highway 1 in California, that magical ribbon of blacktop that snakes along the very edge of the continent. The place this motorcycle is named for. The Pacific Coast."

— Honda Pacific Coast Motorcycle brochure, copyright American Honda Motor Co., Inc.

In addition to naming the PC800 after an important American highway, Honda reinforced the association between the motorcycle and other notable highways of the world; advertising copy from the 1994 Pacific Coast brochure highlighted the famed Amalfi Drive and Blue Ridge Parkway, along with the Pacific Coast Highway.

Similarly, the name of the lower body color for 1996 model referred to another important road, the Karakorum Highway, the highest international highway in the world.

In contrast to motorcycling advertising that emphasized rebellion or exaggerated masculinity, a 1989 30-second introductory television commercial for the PC800 depicted a couple awakening at a stylish waterfront home. She is seen running on the beach, he is seen showering, lifting his Rolex-like wrist watch from the bedside table, fixing coffee—all with a Honda PC800 next to a grand piano in their elegant living room, the waves crashing visibly beyond. The commercial ended with a single shot of the motorcycle at a very calm (i.e., pacific) shoreline carrying the voiceover: "Introducing the Pacific Coast, from Honda. It is the beginning of a new day."

Sales over the entire two-part production run averaged under 1,400 sales per year over ten years.

=== Trunk ===
Unlike other motorcycles that offer detachable side or top cases for storage, the PC800 has an integral waterproof trunk under the pillion: The passenger seat is attached to a single trunk lid that hinges upward to reveal two storage areas that straddle the rear wheel — with sufficient capacity to carry "two full-face helmets and two medium-sized gym bags", or "two grocery bags", or "four plastic bags full of groceries, along with a small bag of dog food." The trunk lid is held up by a hydraulic strut and is controlled by a release mechanism under the lockable fuel filler door.

=== Bodywork ===
Like other motorcycles with full bodywork, the PC800's plastic bodywork conceals almost the entirety of the motorcycle's mechanical underpinnings — in the manner of a scooter. While routine oil changes do not require panel removal the PC800 owners manual calls for removal and replacement of four panels (two each side) for servicing the spark plugs and seven panels for servicing the battery.

The design of the bodywork includes three vents (visible in the photo above) on each side of the bike to cool the mechanicals: a pair of forward vents on the wheel cowling, a lower vent on each side for the transmission, and two larger vents to accommodate the engine's cooling system.

In contrast to other motorcycles with full bodywork, the PC800's trunk occupies the full unbroken width of the bike's tailend while the front wheel carries a partial cowling, which reverted to an open fender in 1997-1998 model years. For the entire production run, the bodywork featured a lower-body accent color.

== Features ==
Honda outfitted the Pacific Coast as a "low-maintenance motorcycle for daily use" aimed primarily toward first-time motorcycle owners. Riding position is standard or neutral, instrumentation is "automobile-like," switches and controls are large and clearly marked, self-canceling turn signals were included until the 1997 model year along with a seat height of 30.1 inches (760 mm) and an integrated fairing and windshield. 1989 and 1990 models offered an optional AM/FM radio.

== Production data ==
The table below outlines production figures, factory paint colors and production notes.

The table uses serial numbers as a basis for estimating production: Official US production bikes carry serial number in the RC340 range, California models carry RC341 numbers, Japanese models carry RC341(J) numbers, and Canadian and European models carried RC342 serial numbers.

Model year	Production	Body color/trim color	Notes
MY1989	6,602	Pearl White/Ocean Gray	All years: fender is upper body color
MY1989	562	Silver/Dark Grey	Japan model S/N RC341(J)
MY1990	3,739	Candy Apple Red/Griffen Gray	light blue option, France and Italy
MY1991	0	--	model year not offered
MY1992	0	--	model year not offered
MY1993	0	--	model year not offered
MY1994	1,193	Black-Z/Griffen Gray	radio option no longer offered
MY1995	1,009	Black-Z/Griffen Gray	--
MY1996	1,070	Magna Red/Karakorum Gray	MY96-98: no clear coat above, MY97-98: no clearcoat below, lower color moulded in (not painted)
MY1997	713	Magna Red/matte black	Self-canceling turn signals discontinued. Front wheel cowling reverted to fender, minor cosmetic, cost-cutting changes
MY1998	510 (approx)	Magna Red/matte black	--
