= Honda CTX series =

Motorcycle

The Honda CTX series is a series of motorcycles created by Honda for the 2014 model year. According to Honda marketing materials, CTX stands for "Comfort, Technology and Experience."

The series includes the following models:

- CTX700/CTX700N
- CTX1300
