= Honda Deauville =

Honda touring motorcycle

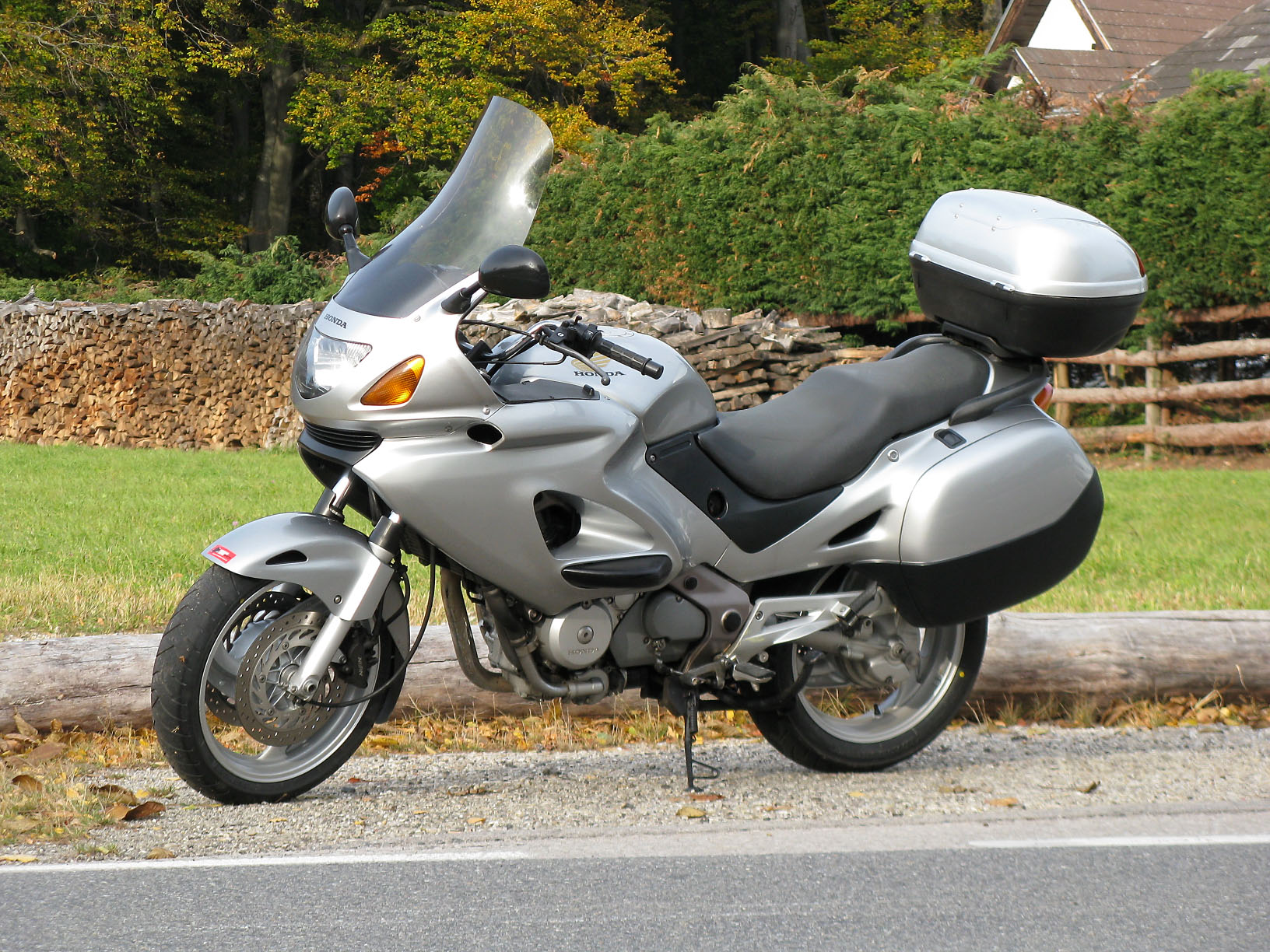
Second generation Honda Deauville NT650V

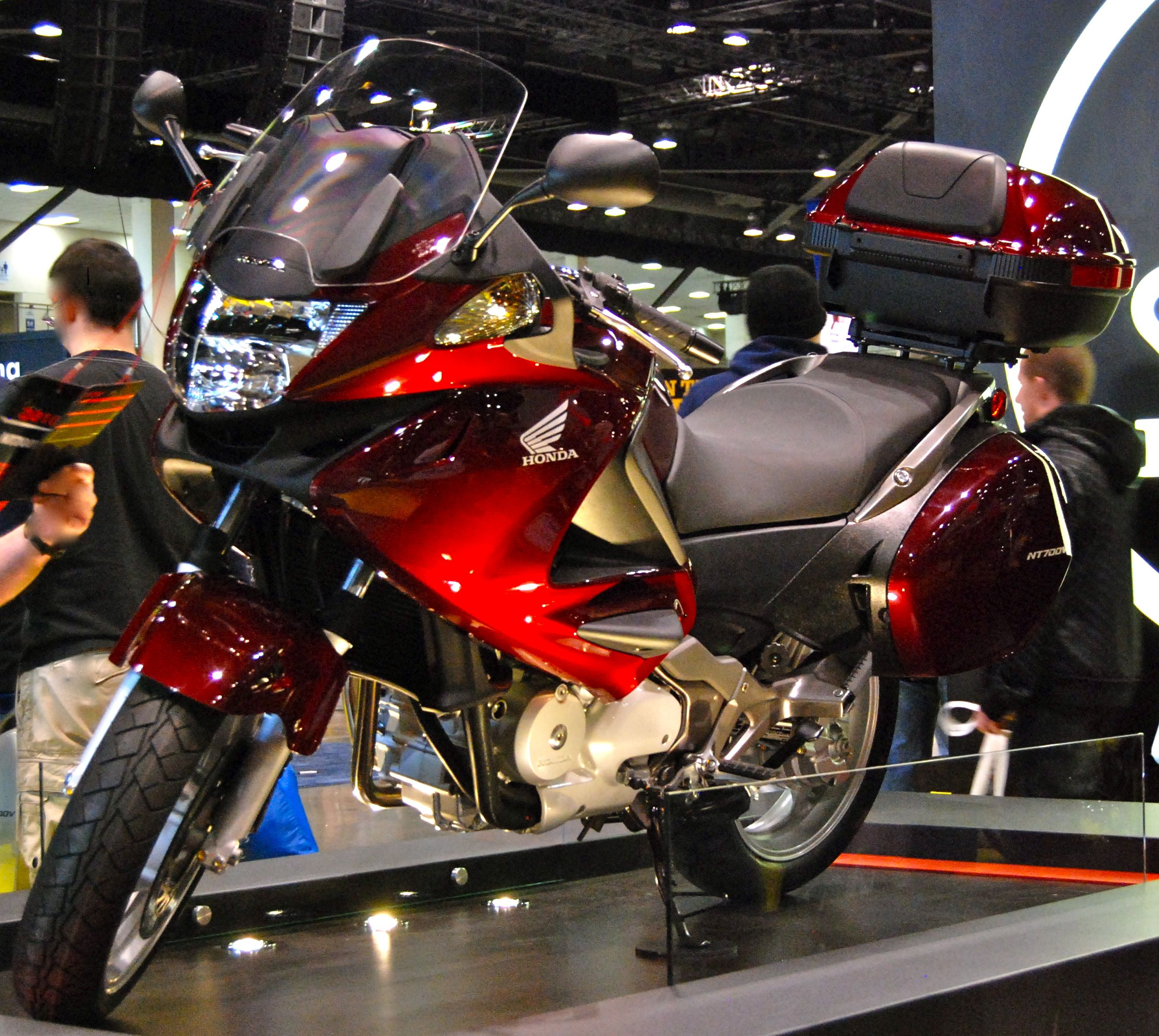
2010 Honda Deauville NT700V (3rd Generation)

The Honda Deauville, also designated the NT650V and NT700V, is a mid-range touring motorcycle manufactured and marketed by Honda over a fifteen-year production run (1998–2013) spanning three generations — and named after the French seaside resort.

Across all three generations, the Deauville was known for its shaft-drive, liquid-cooled V-twin engine and extensive painted plastic bodywork with integrated panniers. The first generation Deauville (1998–2001) featured an engine capacity of 650 cc. The second generation (2002–2005) featured redesigned bodywork, enlarged panniers and numerous engineering modifications. The third generation (2006–2013) featured an engine capacity enlarged to 680 cc and was renamed the NT700V Deauville. Honda marketed the third generation in the US for model years 2010–2013, simply as the NT700V.

With a history of designing bikes with integral storage — namely the Pacific Coast/PC800, ST1100, Gold Wing and ST1300 — Honda designed the Deauville/NT700V with two integral side panniers offering a 7-gallon/45-litre cargo capacity — connected via an open pass-through port to accommodate items up to 26" long.

== History ==
In 1998, the NT650V Deauville debuted with a fully integrated three-quarter fairing and panniers to distinguish it from the Honda NTV650, on which it was based. The engine was also re-tuned for stronger low-to-midrange torque. To further suit its touring role, the fuel tank capacity was enlarged to 19 litres.

With only minor additions in 1999, the motorcycle remained unchanged until it was redesigned in 2002. Larger-capacity panniers (left capacity increased from 18 to 24 litres; right capacity increased from 16.7 to 19.5 litres) with more secure cover latches and hinges were fitted. The engine was overhauled with lighter pistons and other engine modifications to reduce vibration. A catalytic converter was fitted to ensure compliance with the stricter EU emissions laws. A combined braking system was fitted and the front brakes were upgraded to 3-piston calipers.

With minor modifications in 2004, the design remained largely unchanged until its relaunch as the NT700V in 2006. The third generation Deauville featured programmed fuel-injection system, digital transistorized ignition with electronic advance, power delivery via shaft drive, five-speed gearbox, cable-actuated clutch, center and side stands, standard riding posture, 58.1" wheelbase, 31.7" seat height, 5.2-gallon fuel tank, three-spoke 17" alloy wheels, 562-lb curb weight, linked braking system with optional ABS, manually adjustable five-position integral windscreen and integral fairing, twin trip odometers, instant and average MPG readouts and twin dash-mounted storage compartments (one lockable).

== Specifications ==
	NT650V	NT700V
Engine	Two cylinder 52° V Twin, Four stroke	
Displacement	647 cc	680.2 cc
Bore & Stroke	79 mm × 66 mm (3.11 in × 2.60 in)	81 mm × 66 mm (3.19 in × 2.60 in)
Valvetrain	SOHC, 3 valves per cylinder	SOHC, 4 valves per cylinder
Compression ratio	9.2:1	10:1
Maximum power	41 kW (55 hp) @ 7,750 rpm	48.3 kW (65 hp) @ 8,000 rpm
Maximum torque	55 N⋅m (41 lb⋅ft) @ 6,250 rpm	66.2 N⋅m (48.8 lb⋅ft) @ 6,500 rpm
Starter	Electric	
Cooling system	Water cooled	
Transmission	Five-speed	
Gear ratios	1: 3.000 (33/11); 2: 1.941 (33/17); 3: 1.500 (30/20); 4: 1.240 (31/25); 5: 1.095 (23/21)	1: 2.571 (36/14); 2: 1.688 (27/16); 3: 1.300 (26/20); 4: 1.074 (29/27); 5: 0.923 (24/26)
Clutch	Wet, multiplate with coil springs	
Drivetrain	Enclosed shaft	
Seat Height	814 mm (32 inch)	806 mm (31.7 inch)
Fuel capacity	19 litres (4.2 imp gal; 5.0 US gal) including 3.5 litre reserve	19.7 litres (4.3 imp gal; 5.2 US gal)
Brakes	Front: 296 mm dual disc Rear: 276mm single disc	Front: 296 mm dual disc Rear: 276 mm single disc Optional ABS
Dry weight	233 kg (514 lb)	236 kg (520 lb)
