= Yamaha FJR1300 =

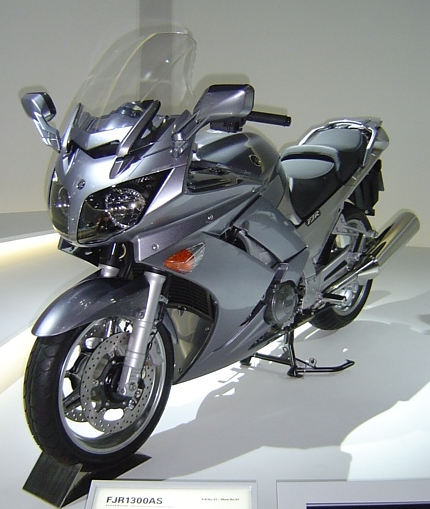
- Manufacturer: Yamaha
- Production: since 2001
- Predecessor: FJ1200
- Class: Sport Touring
- Engine: 1,298 cc (79.2 cu in) transverse inline-4, liquid-cooled, DOHC, four valves per cylinder, electronic fuel injection
- Bore / stroke: 79.0 mm × 66.2 mm (3.11 in × 2.61 in)
- Compression ratio: 10.8:1
- Power: 105.5 kW (141.5 hp) @ 8,000 rpm
- Torque: 134.4 N⋅m (99.1 lbf⋅ft) @ 7,000 rpm
- Transmission: 5-speed manual (6-speed from 2016), shaft-drive AS: Electronic clutch
- Suspension: Front: 48 mm telescopic fork, 137 mm wheel travel Rear: Single shock, link type, 122 mm wheel travel
- Brakes: Front: Dual 320 mm disc four-piston calipers Rear: Single 283 mm disc two-piston caliper ABS standard (optional before 2006)
- Tires: Front: 120/70ZR17; Rear: 180/55ZR17
- Rake, trail: 26º, 109 mm (4.3 in)
- Wheelbase: 1,545 mm (60.8 in)
- Dimensions: L: 2,230 mm (88 in); W: 750 mm (30 in); H: 1,450 mm (57 in)
- Seat height: 805 mm (31.7 in)
- Weight: 264 kg (582 lb); AE/AS: 269 kg (593 lb) (dry); 291 kg (642 lb); AE/AS: 295 kg (650 lb) (wet)
- Fuel capacity: 25 L (5.5 imp gal; 6.6 US gal)

The Yamaha FJR1300A and FJR1300AE/AS are sport touring motorcycles made by Yamaha Motor Company. Both models have a 1,298 cc inline-four engine. The AE/AS model has an electronically controlled clutch and gear shifting system called YCC-S. The clutch and transmissions of the AE/AS models are identical to that of the standard FJR model. The FJR1300 was discontinued between 2022 (Europe) and then 2023 (USA).

== History ==
The FJR1300 was introduced to Europe in 2001, before arriving in North America in 2002, with the 2003 model year designation, and offered in a non-ABS version only. The 2003 model garnered several awards in the sport touring category from various magazines.

The 2004 North American models included both a non-ABS version with traditional blue anodized brake calipers and a new ABS version with silver calipers. Other refinements included an upgrade to the suspension rates, 320 mm front brake discs (was 298 mm), and a fairing pocket for small items.

The 2005, North American model year remained structurally unchanged with a non-ABS and ABS model.

In 2006, the U.S. and rest of the world model years synchronized with the introduction of what has become known as the 'Gen-II' version of the machine. The design changes included significant trailing arm changes, revised final drive ratio, a curved radiator exhibiting a larger surface area, instrumentation changes, an upgraded alternator and significant attention to airflow changes to deal with reported heat issues in previous years. Yamaha added adjustable vents to the FJR1300, allowing the rider to direct air closer to or away from the body. Starting with the 2006 models Anti-Lock Brakes (ABS) and a linked braking scheme Yamaha calls 'Unified Braking System' (UBS) became standard.

Also, the FJR1300AS model (FJR1300AE in the US and Canada) was introduced which had a semi-automatic transmission. The AE variant was discontinued for 2010, although the AS model continued to be sold in markets outside of the US and Canada.

For 2007, some very minor changes were made to the ECU to deal with potential issues related to altitude changes under certain circumstances. In 2008 changes were made to throttle 'feel', to improve low speed on/off throttle transitions. As well as Yamaha changed suppliers for the ABS system. Further refinements in the throttle control were introduced with the 2009 model.

For 2012 the previously optional heated handgrips became standard.

For 2013 the FJR1300 received a substantial number of updates, becoming the 'Gen-III' version. Bodywork is all new on the front half of the bike for better airflow and engine heat management, and a new faster-acting windshield mechanism was introduced. Front turn signal/position lights are now LEDs and there are LED accent lights around the headlights, and there is now one horn instead of two on prior years. In markets outside the US and Canada, the AS (AutoShift) model received an electrically adjustable suspension and inverted front forks - those suspension changes were introduced into the North American models in the following year as a model option known as the 'ES'.

The dash was revised to include three user-customizable informational pages. In addition to new controls for D-Mode and cruise control, several hand controls were changed.

Mechanically, the engine was given plated-on (rather than pressed in) cylinder linings for better heat dissipation. The ECU is new and now employs Yamaha Chip Controlled Throttle (YCCT) system, which is a ride-by-wire system. The implementation on the FJR1300 includes 'D-Mode', which incorporates two driving modes, 'sport' and 'touring', the primary difference being smoothness of throttle response. In addition to that, the new ECU incorporates as standard has an integrated Traction Control System (TCS) which can be disabled and cruise control. Cruise control is limited to 80 mph in 2013 (raised in 2014 to 100 mph).

In 2014 the FJR1300 split off into two models: the FJR1300A and the FJR1300ES. The FJR1300ES adds inverted forks and electronically adjustable suspension over the FJR1300A. Both models include an update in which the cruise control programming was changed to raise the maximum set-speed from 83MPH to 100MPH.

The suspension on the ES model can be adjusted via a menu system built into the gauge cluster. The front forks have adjustable damping, with three main settings (Soft, Standard, Hard) and seven adjustments within each level for fine-tuning. The rear shock has electronically adjustable preload, with four settings. While the damping can be adjusted on the fly, the preload can only be changed while stopped.

In December 2015 Yamaha revised the FJR for 2016 giving the machine a 6-speed transmission (both in standard and auto-shift versions), slipper/assist clutch, LED headlights and taillights, and a revised instrument cluster data layout. On the auto-shift and Electronically adjustable suspension versions progressive LED cornering lights were added as well.

Current sub-models outside the U.S. and Canada are the A (standard), AE (with electronic suspension and cornering LEDs), and AS (which has the features of the AE and also includes the YCC-S system replacing the gear shift actuator and clutch). The bike was discontinued for Europe in 2020. As of November 2025, new FJR1300 is still being sold in Asia, North America and Australia.

== Design ==
=== Engine ===
The FJR1300 has a 1,298 cc (79.2 cu in) transverse-mounted inline-four engine with four valves per cylinder.

=== Transmission ===
The FJR1300 uses a five-speed sequential manual gearbox (six-speed from 2016 model onwards) with wide-ratio gears. The final-drive is via shaft, encased within the swingarm, which has mono-shock suspension with a remote quick-set two-position adjustable pre-load.

The FJR1300AS model has an electrically actuated gearshift and an EFM auto-clutch – together, Yamaha calls this system YCC-S. It is a semi-automatic transmission, so there is no hand-operated clutch lever. Instead, the YCC-S system allows the rider to shift using a set of manually operated push-buttons on the left handlebar, or via the standard foot-operated gear-shift lever. The clutch is controlled by engine power; when shifting gears, the computer momentarily reduces the fuel feed and a solenoid performs the gear change; gear shifts are performed in approximately 0.2 seconds. The gearbox pattern is also unconventional in that neutral is at the bottom end of the range; otherwise, the gearbox is identical to the A model. The ECU automatically controls the electronic clutch and the ignition timing to ensure smooth gear shifting, and will actuate the clutch at standstill. Stalling the engine is normally not possible.

The 2016 model, introduced in December 2015, has a 6-speed transmission and the traditional-shift models are equipped with a slipper clutch. Of note is that the new clutch can be retro-fitted to prior models of the FJR1300 if owners are so inclined

=== Chassis ===
The frame of the FJR1300 is a twin-spar design manufactured from aluminum alloy; the engine is a fully stressed member.

=== Electrical system ===
The FJR1300 has a standard 12 volt, negative ground electrical system. The 2006 and later models have a fused, switched cigarette-lighter style accessory jack in the left central locking glovebox. The 2003 U.S. model does not have a glovebox or electrical outlet; while model years 2004 and 2005 have glove boxes, they do not include the electrical outlet. As well, 2006 and later models have larger alternators and so can support more electrical accessories than their predecessors.

=== Other ===
The FJR1300 has an electrically adjusted windshield controlled by a rocker switch on the handlebars. In Generation I and Gen II models, by default the shield returns to its lowest position when the key is off, however some riders choose to disable the 'return' function. In the Gen III model, the windshield maintains its position until changed with the rocker switch, even when the ignition is turned off.

A number of changes were made beginning with the 2006 model year, including adding a rider-adjustable airflow system.

All Gen-II AE/AS models (and some A models, depending on year and market) have standard integrated heated handlebar grips with speed-sensitive adjustment (available as an aftermarket OEM kit for models not so equipped by the factory). The handlebars are position adjustable, with 3 settings, and the seat is adjustable to high or low, with about an inch between the two.

Locking side panniers are supplied as standard in most markets and some markets include cloth 'liners' which can be used as a carry-all for the contents of the cases. Each case will take a full-face helmet. Factory options include foot protectors, handguards, fairing protectors, larger windshield, and a color-coordinated top box to name but a few.

Many riders equip their bikes with a servo-operated cruise control system. There are several providers supplying the market. 2013 and later models have cruise control standard.

== Police models ==
In 2008, the FJR1300 replaced the Honda ST1100 Pan-European and the BMW R1150RT in the Traffic Corps of Ireland's National Police Force, the Garda Síochána, and stayed in service until 2016 when it was itself replaced by the BMW R1200RT. In the UK, the FJR1300 has replaced the Honda ST1300 Pan-European as the patrol motorcycle with several police forces, following that model's withdrawal due to concerns over high-speed handling. In addition the FJR is used by the Blood Bikes organisation, volunteers who move blood and or organs around the UK between hospitals. The FJR is the patrol vehicle used by the police force of Trinidad and Tobago including the units in the convoy of the President and the Prime Minister. It is also used as the standard patrol motorcycle of the Royal Netherlands Marechaussee. The Danish, French and Australian Federal Police, the Lithuanian Police and the Spanish Guardia Civil also use the FJR1300. Vietnamese Police only use for special events like Xi Jinping visit or Trump - Kim summit.

Both outfitters had different styles in modifying the civilian version of the machine for police service. Enforcement Motors removed the Yamaha crash bars, rear trunk, and foot wind deflectors, opting for larger "canyon cages", a larger and heavier aluminum fabricated trunk and large lights mounted high. EVS opts for keeping the factory Yamaha parts, with a much narrower overall body, and adding lighting to flow with the motorcycle. The Enforcement Motors package moved the center of gravity up to about knee height for an average rider, while the EVS package kept the original Yamaha designed center of gravity, at slightly above the ankle.

Yamaha's factory FJR1300 police edition was formally introduced into the United States in 2018. The US version does not have the ES electronically controlled suspension, opting for a more traditional suspension setup. They have taller front windscreens, wind deflectors on the handguards, and wind deflectors mounted by the feet. The rear trunk and crash bars are Yamaha Police specific. The 1300P has ABS with linked braking and integrated siren and light controls for police equipment. The engine power output is the same as the civilian versions, at 124 wheel horsepower and 99.9 wheel foot lbs of torque. The US versions are the newer 6 speed motorcycles with LED lighting.

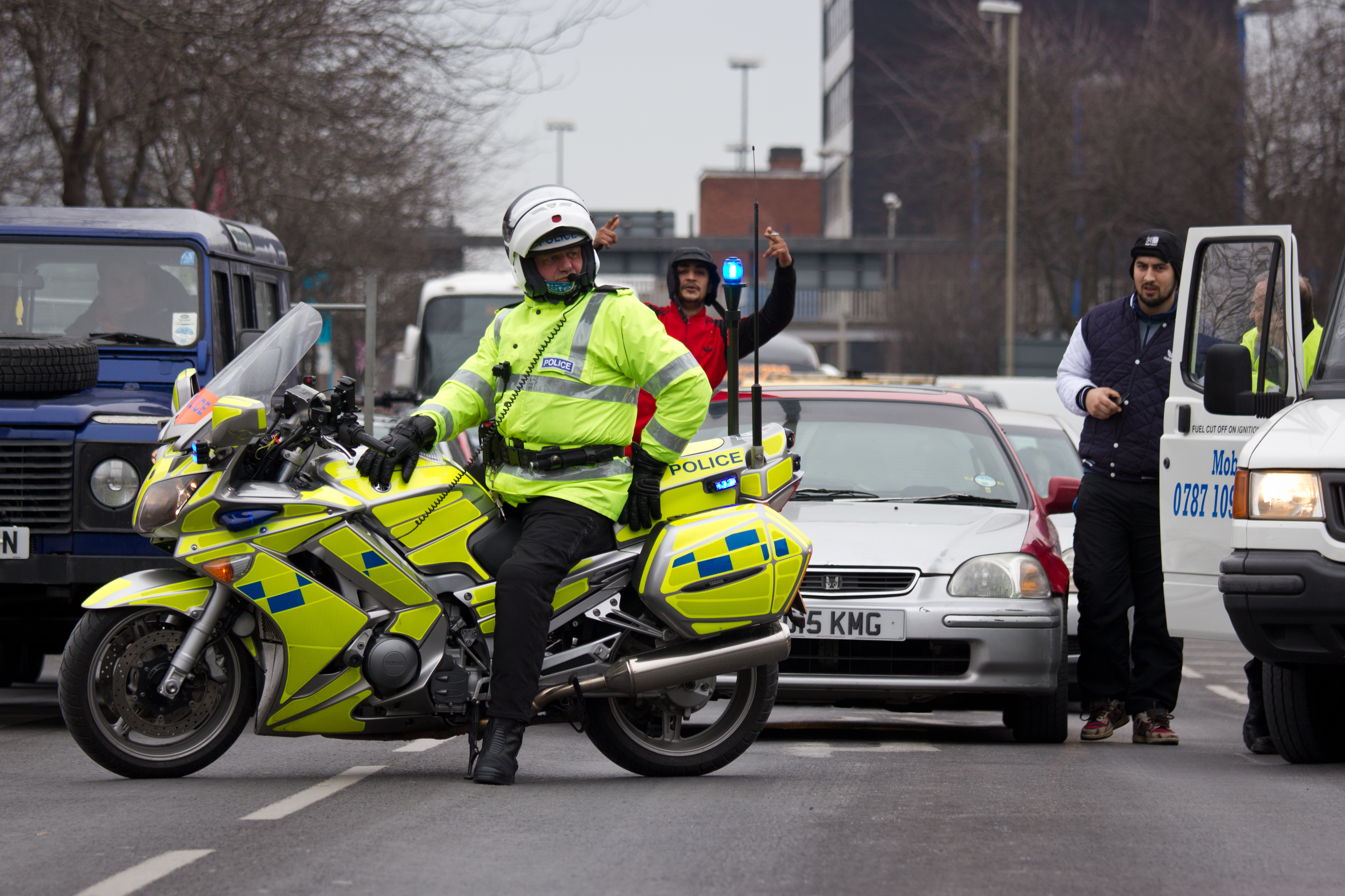
Yamaha FJR1300A used by British Police

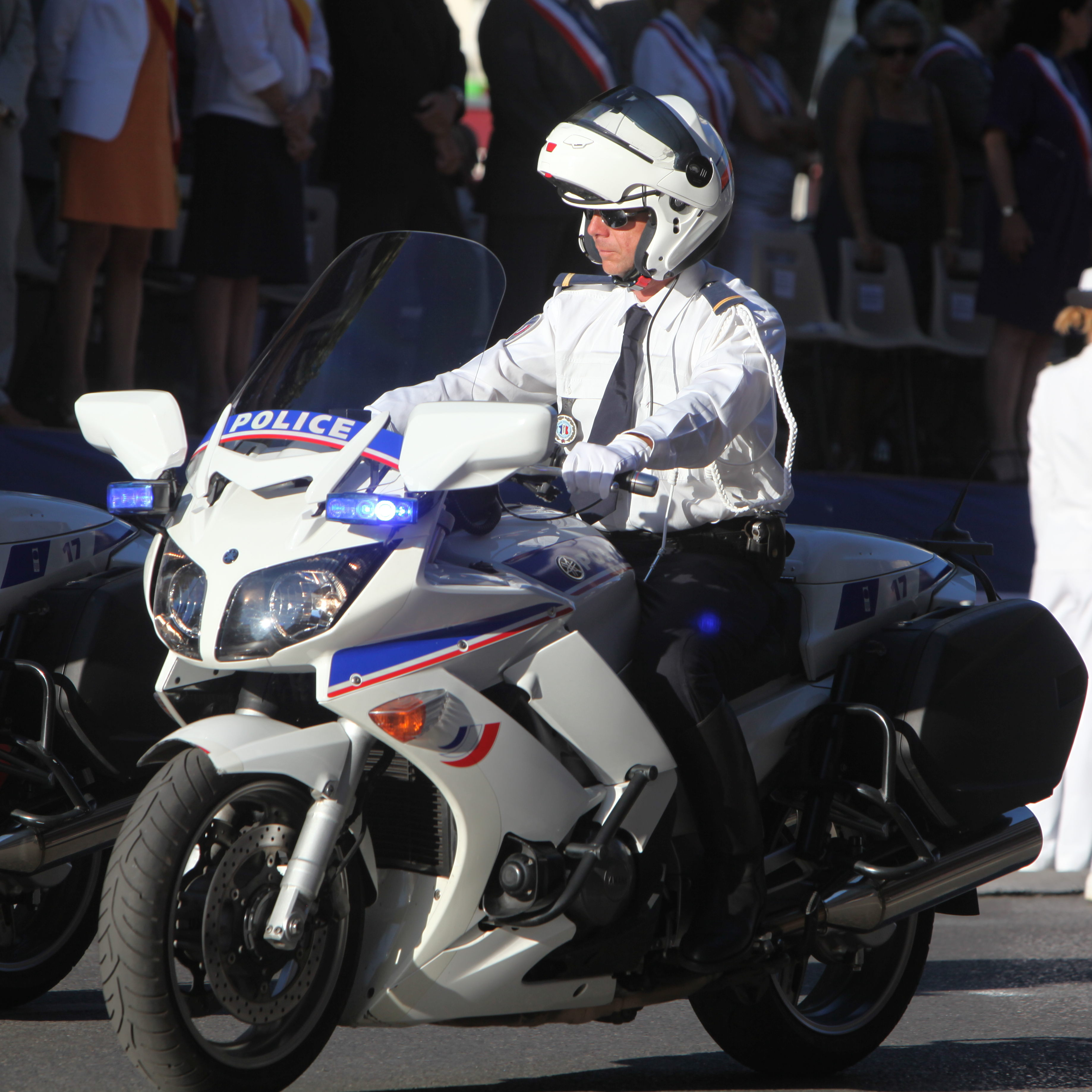
Yamaha FJR1300A used by French Police

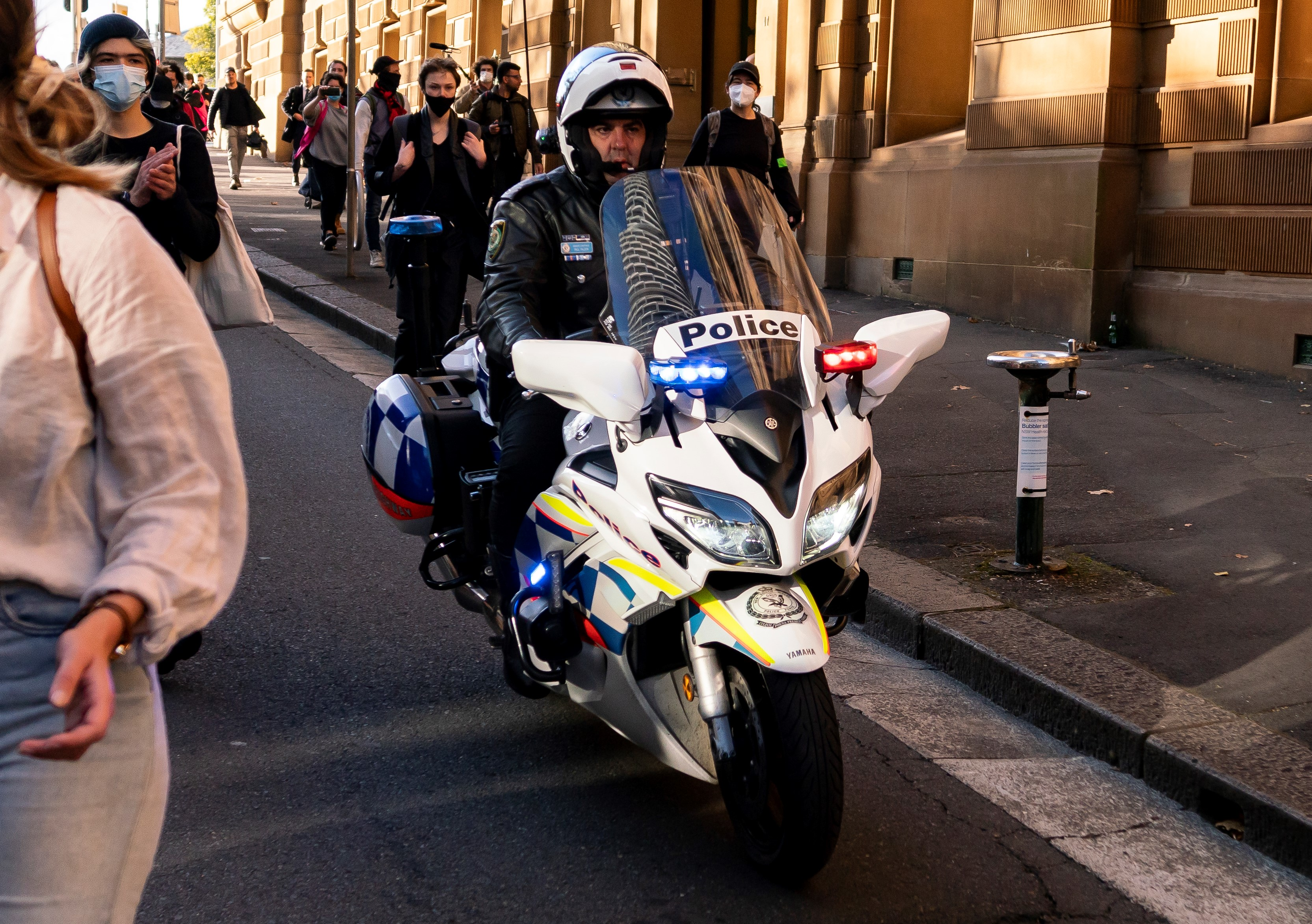
Yamaha FJR1300A used by NSW Police Force

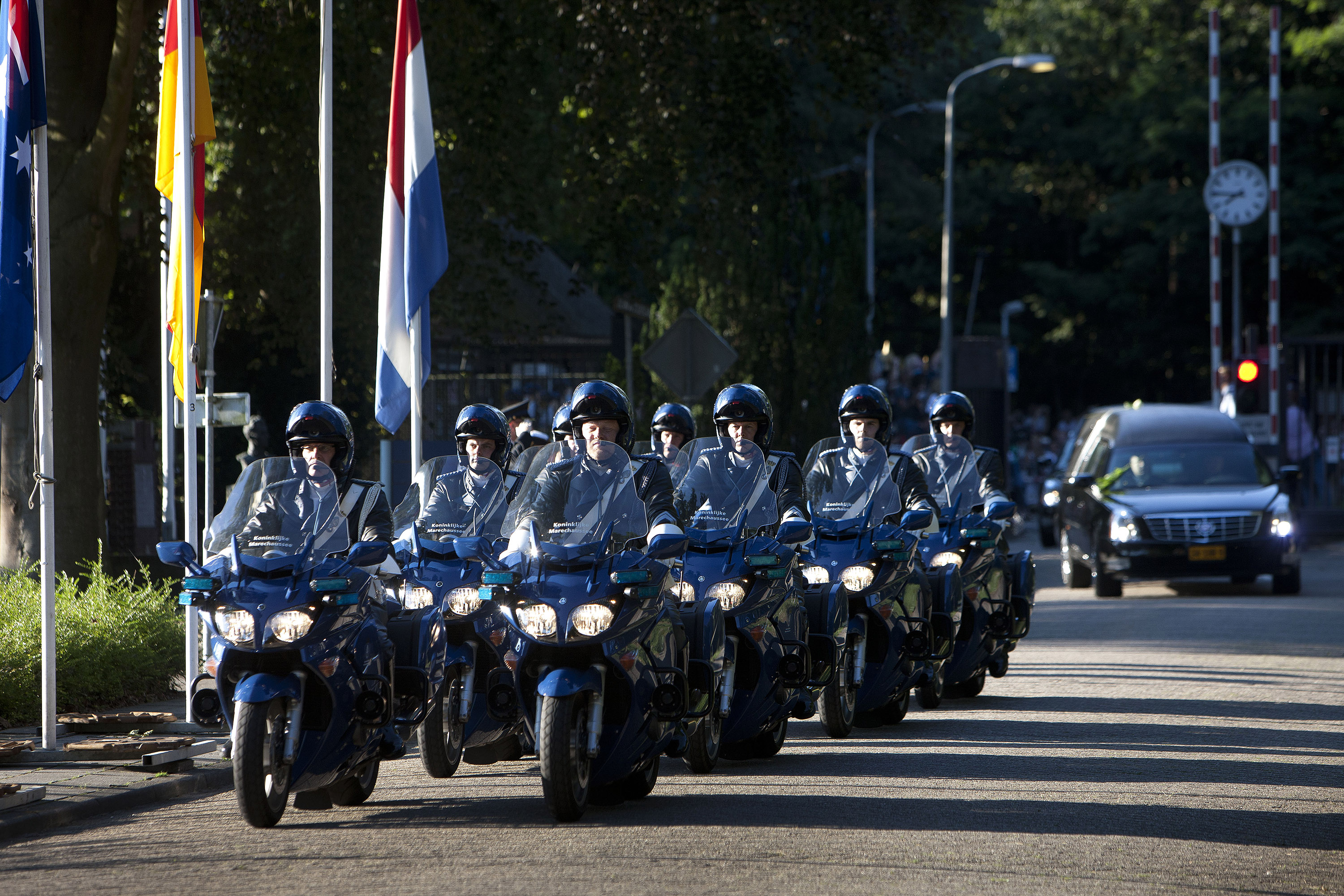
Royal Marechaussee FJR1300

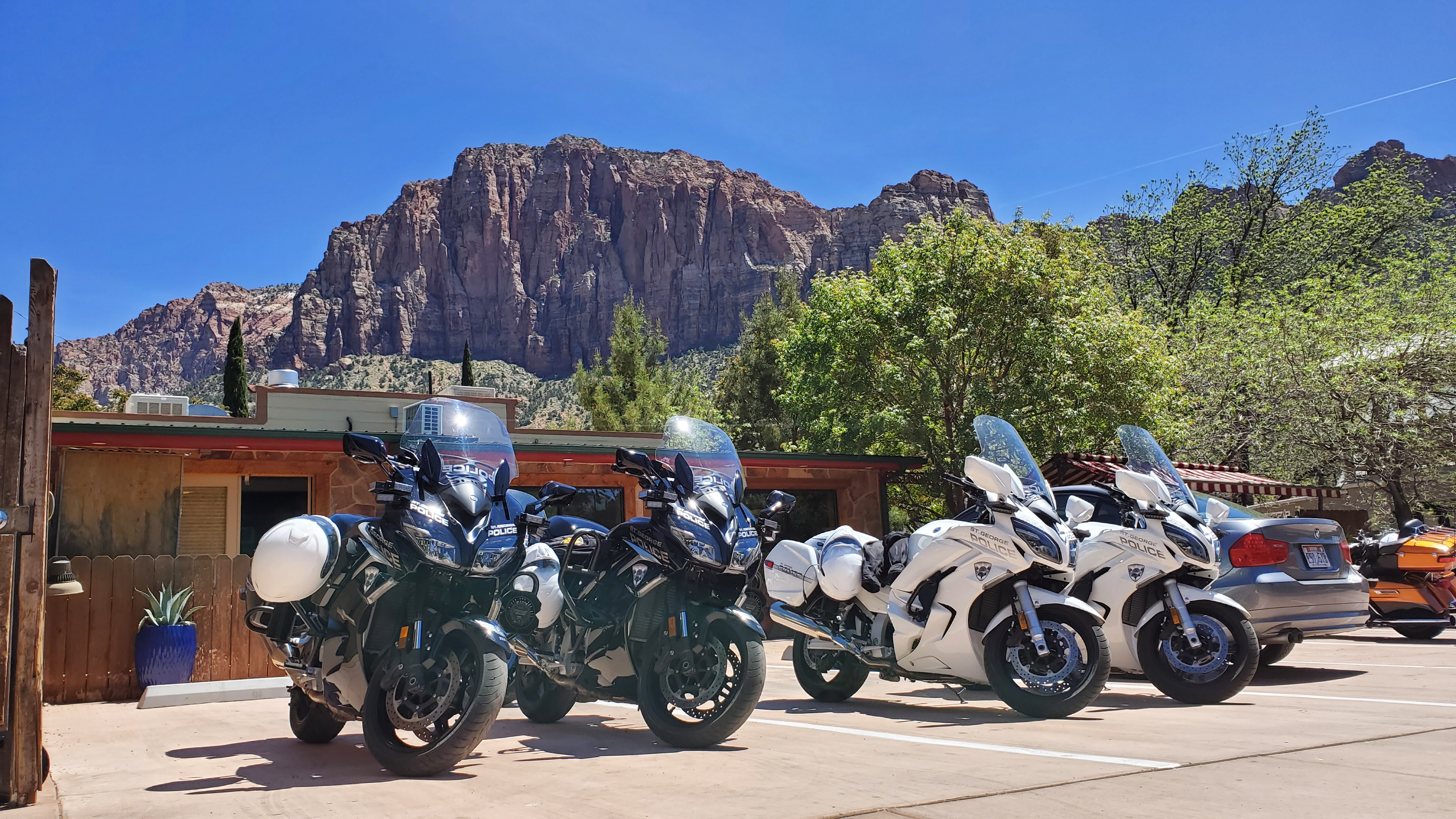
St George Police at Zion National Park

== See also ==
- List of Yamaha motorcycles
