= Yamaha FJ =

Type of sport touring motorcycle

Yamaha FJ1200
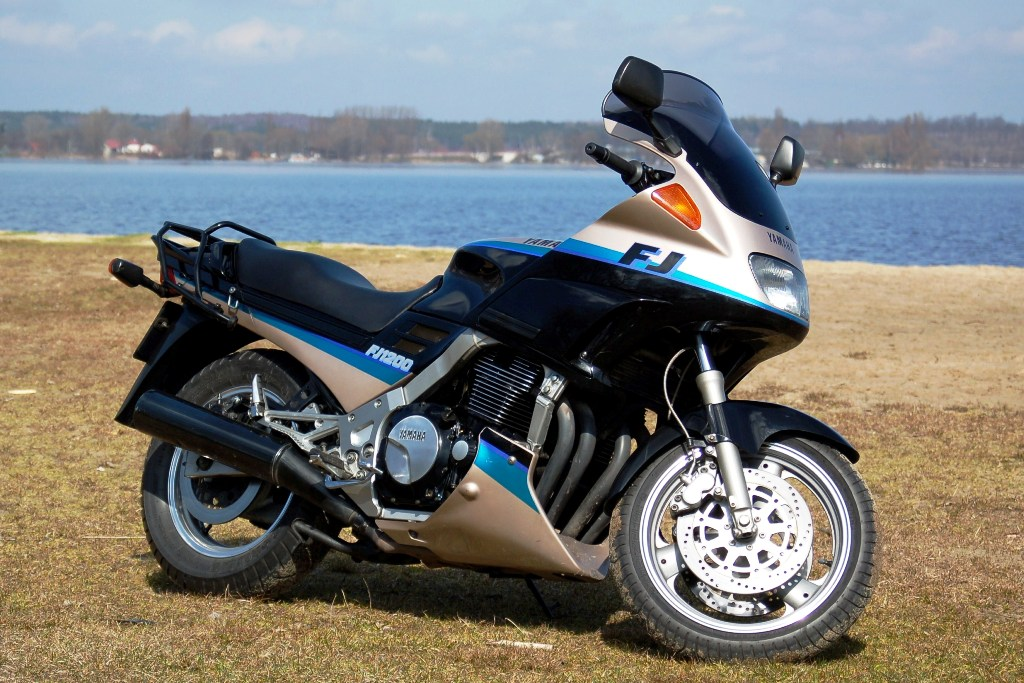
- Yamaha FJ1200, 3XW model
- Manufacturer: Yamaha
- Also called: FJ
- Production: 1986-1996
- Predecessor: FJ1100
- Successor: FJR1300
- Class: Sport touring
- Engine: 1,188 cc air/oil-cooled in-line four-cylinder
- Transmission: 5-speed sequential manual transmission, chain-drive
- Rake, trail: 27.5 degrees, 112 mm (4.4 in)
- Wheelbase: 1,495 mm (58.9 in)
- Dimensions: L: 2,230 mm (88 in); W: 775 mm (30.5 in)
- Weight: 266 kg (586 lb) (wet)
- Fuel capacity: 24 L (5.3 imp gal; 6.3 US gal)

The Yamaha FJ1100 and FJ1200 are sport touring motorcycles that were produced by Yamaha between 1984 and 1996.

== FJ1100 ==
Yamaha released the FJ1100 for model years 1984 and 1985. The FJ1100 was designed by GK Dynamics. This class is characterised by retaining sportiness while integrating more street-friendly riding characteristics, including good maneuverability as well as long-distance comfort, such as a more upright seating configuration designed to reduce back strain and a large fairing to reduce fatigue from wind resistance. Emphasis is placed on a balance of utility and sport, rather than pure performance orientation. The machine was noticeably narrower than many contemporaries, Yamaha achieved this by placing the alternator behind the cylinders instead of the more normal position on the end of the crankshaft.

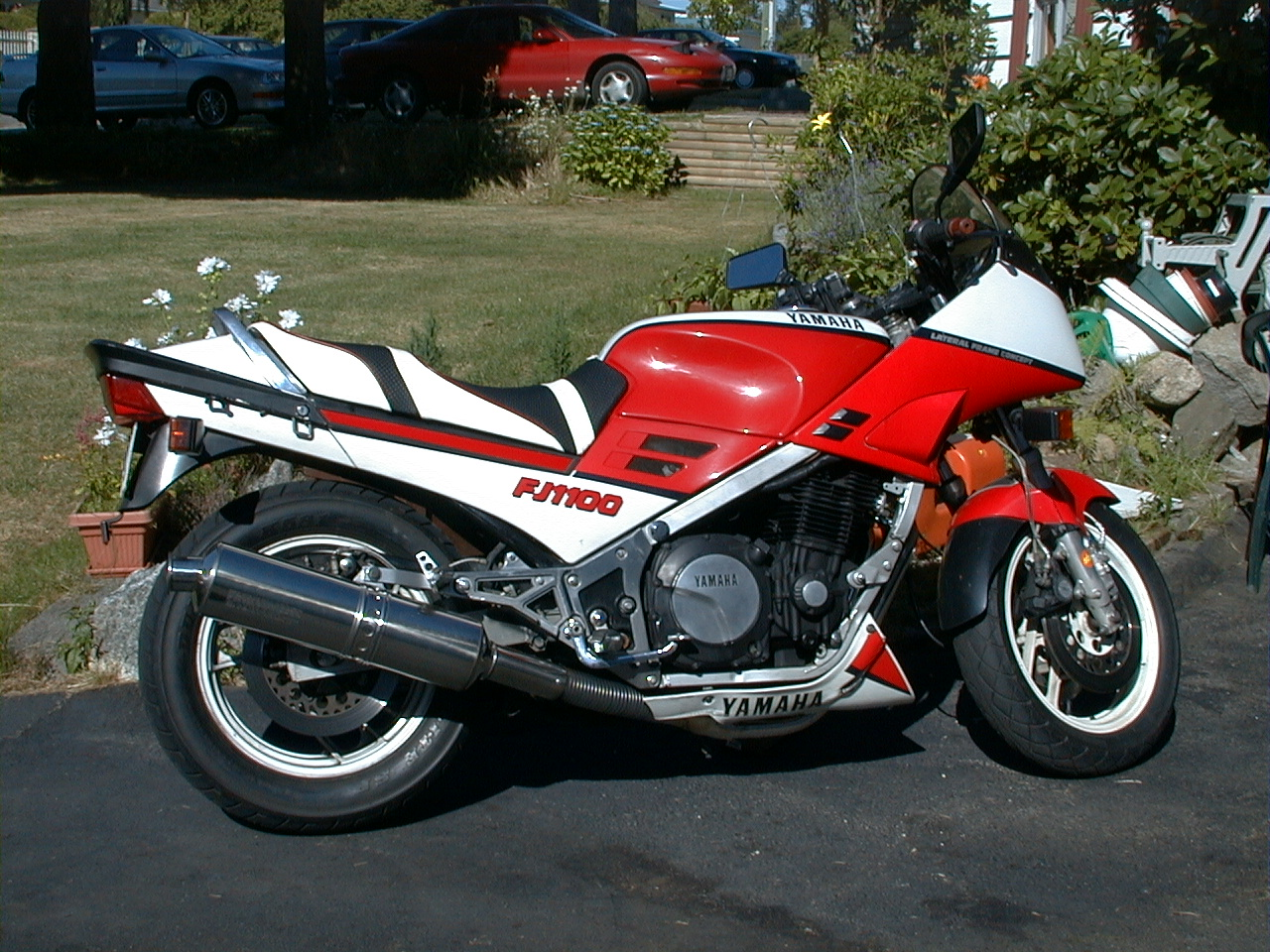
1984 FJ1100 with custom made seat

== FJ1200 ==
In 1986 Yamaha upgraded the FJ1100 by increasing the engine displacement slightly and adding upgraded suspension and other components. The result was the FJ1200. They also changed the colour choices with the next model, but they weren't significant. The peak power output was raised slightly to 130 bhp (97 kW) from the FJ1100s 125 bhp (93 kW), the FJ1200 had more low- to mid-range torque. The FJ1200 was produced in three main successive versions (1TX, 3CV and 3XW) each updated version benefiting from improvements to bodywork, front and rear suspension components, and the addition of an optional ABS-equipped version (FJ1200A) from 1991 until 1996 when Yamaha discontinued the FJ1200 in the United Kingdom. The model was discontinued in the United States in 1993. Market competitors during its production years included the BMW K100RS, Suzuki's 1100 Katana, and Kawasaki's Ninja ZX-10.

=== Engine ===
The FJ1200 uses a four cylinder in-line layout and is air-cooled. Sixteen valves are operated by a chain-driven double overhead camshaft; valve clearances are adjusted using shims. The four constant-velocity carburettors are mounted in a bank behind the cylinders and feed each cylinder through a short intake manifolds. Four exhaust downpipes join a box below the engine where the gases are split to exit through two silencers (mufflers). The crankshaft is geared directly to the clutch, no counter balancer shaft is used. Starting is by electric starter only. Lubrication is wet sump using a trochoid pump; an oil radiator assists with cooling. Both the FJ1100 and FJ1200 were fitted with an additional fuel vapour recovery system to comply with California emission regulations.

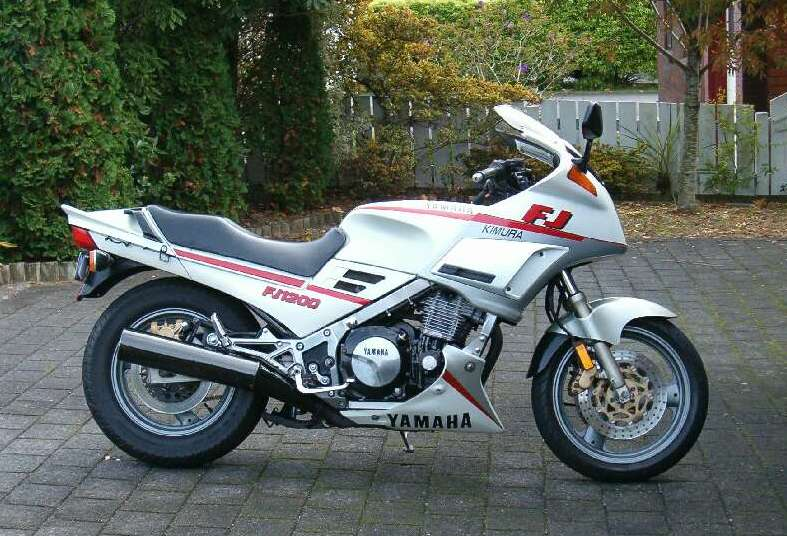
1990 FJ1200 Model 3CV with standard windscreen

=== Transmission ===
The FJ1200 uses a five-speed constant-mesh sequential manual close-ratio gearbox. The clutch is of the wet, multiple-disc diaphragm spring type and is hydraulically operated. Final drive is by O-ring chain and sprockets.

=== Chassis ===
The frame of the FJ1200 is manufactured from mild steel box-section and uses a perimeter layout, the fairing and upper rear section use separate cylindrical tubing sub-frames. The rear shock absorber is placed vertically behind the engine and connects to a swinging arm made from extruded aluminium alloy (note: later 3XW models have mild steel swinging arm) via several forged aluminium rocker arms. The 17-inch front wheel is held between 41 mm spring and oil damped forks. The FJ1100 and early FJ1200 models featured adjustable anti-dive units and a smaller diameter 16-inch wheel. The FJ1100 and early FJ1200 used twin ventilated disc brakes for the front wheel with a single ventilated disc at the rear. FJ1200 models, 3CV & 3XW, used solid front discs but retained the rear ventilated disc, front brake calipers were upgraded to a four-piston design. An anti-lock braking system was used on the FJ1200A. A full fairing protects the rider, varying height fixed windscreens were available as options.

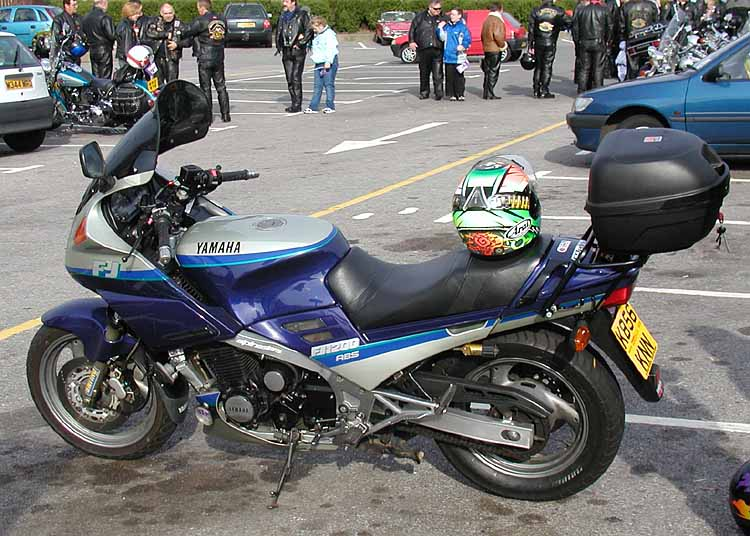
FJ1200 with ABS brakes

=== Electrical system ===
The FJ1200 features a standard 12 volt electrical system. The alternator and starter motor is mounted behind the cylinders. Nippondenso Transistor Controlled Ignition (TCI) is used in conjunction with two coils. Yamaha's self-cancelling indicator unit is used and a variable resistance gauging system is used to monitor engine oil contents with associated warning lights. A large fuel gauge is provided as is a low fuel level warning light. A digital clock is also fitted. A safety feature of the FJ1200 is that the engine ignition is cut if the first gear is selected with the side-stand down, this is now commonplace on modern motorcycles.

== Specifications ==
	FJ1100	FJ1200
Engine	1,097 cc (67 cu in), 4-stroke, four-cylinder, air-cooled, in-line	1,188 cc (72.5 cu in), 4-stroke, four-cylinder, air-cooled, in-line
Bore Stroke	74.0 mm × 63.8 mm (2.91 in × 2.51 in)	77.0 mm × 63.8 mm (3.03 in × 2.51 in)
Compression Ratio	9.5:1	9.7:1
Fuel System	Mikuni BS36 36 mm carburettor x 4	Mikuni BS36 36 mm carburettor x 4
Fuel Tank Capacity	24.5 L (5.4 imp gal; 6.5 US gal)	24 L (5.3 imp gal; 6.3 US gal)
Lubrication	Wet sump	
Ignition	TCI (Analogue)	TCI (Analogue) 1986–1987 / TCI (Digital) 1988–1996
Transmission	5-speed constant-mesh sequential manual	
Final Drive	chain-drive	
Overall Length	2,230 mm (87.8 in)	2,235 mm (88.0 in)
Overall Width	730 mm (28.7 in)	775 mm (30.5 in)
Overall Height	1,230 mm (48.4 in)	1,245 mm (49.0 in)
Seat Height	780 mm (30.7 in)	790 mm (31.1 in)
Ground Clearance	140 mm (5.5 in)	
Wheelbase	1,490 mm (58.7 in)	1,495 mm (58.9 in)
Weight incl. oil, full fuel tank, etc.	252 kg (556 lb)	266 kg (586 lb)
Suspension Front	Telescopic, coil spring, adjustable spring preload, brake linked anti-dive system	Telescopic, coil spring, adjustable spring preload, adjustable rebound damping
Suspension Rear	Link-type, gas/oil damped,	Link-type, gas/oil damped, 8-way adjustable spring preload, 12-way adjustable rebound damping
Brakes Front	Dual hydraulic disc	
Brakes Rear	Single hydraulic disc	
Tires Front	120/80-VR16 (through 1987) 120/70-VR17 (1988 on)	
Tires Rear	150/80-VR16	

== See also ==
- List of Yamaha motorcycles
