= Honda CTX1300 =

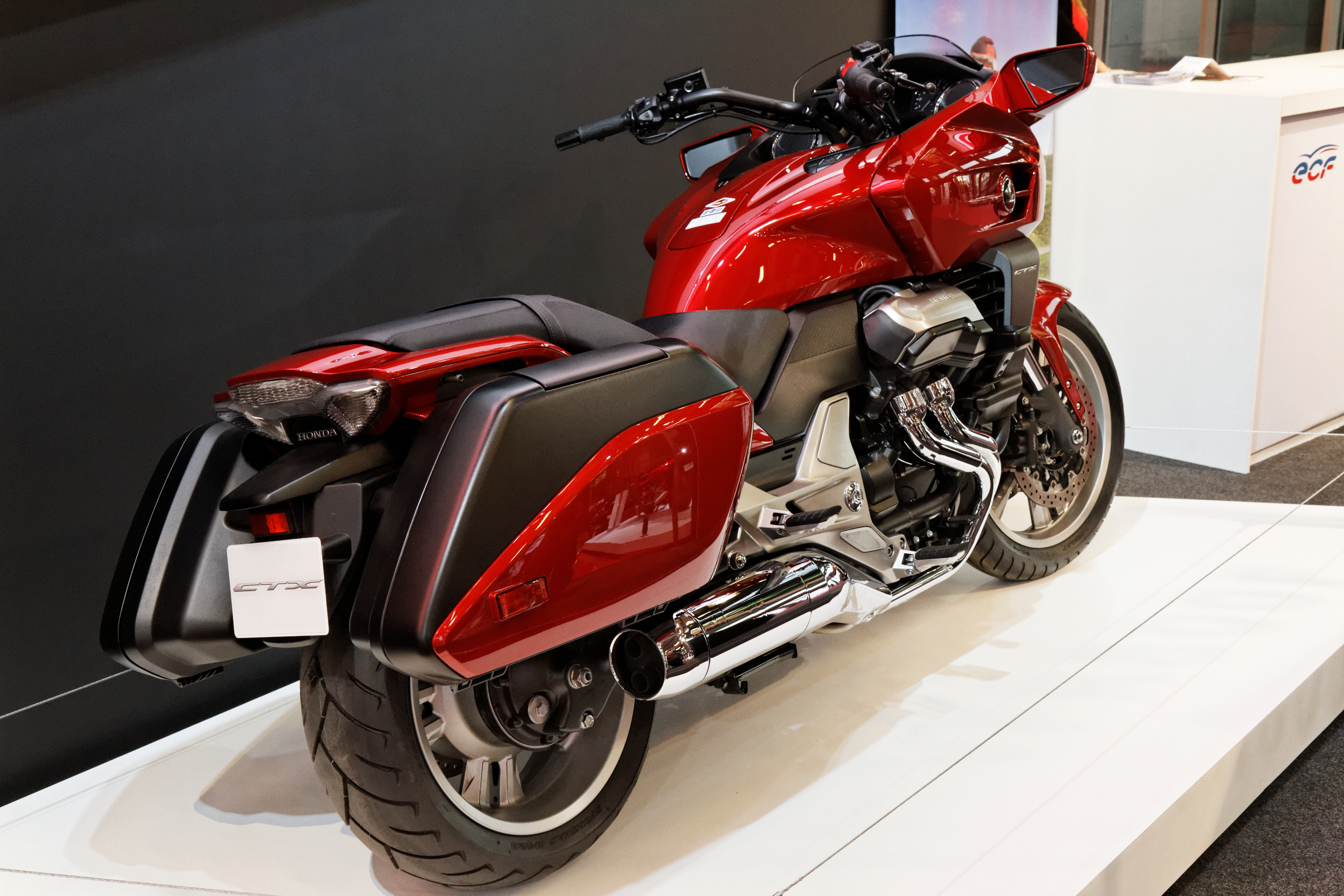
- Manufacturer: Honda
- Production: 2014
- Predecessor: Honda ST1300
- Engine: 1,261 cc (77.0 cu in) liquid-cooled V four four-stroke engine
- Bore / stroke: 78 mm × 66 mm (3.1 in × 2.6 in)
- Transmission: shaft drive
- Wheelbase: 1,640 mm (65 in)
- Seat height: 74 mm (2.9 in)
- Fuel capacity: 19.3 L (4.2 imp gal; 5.1 US gal)

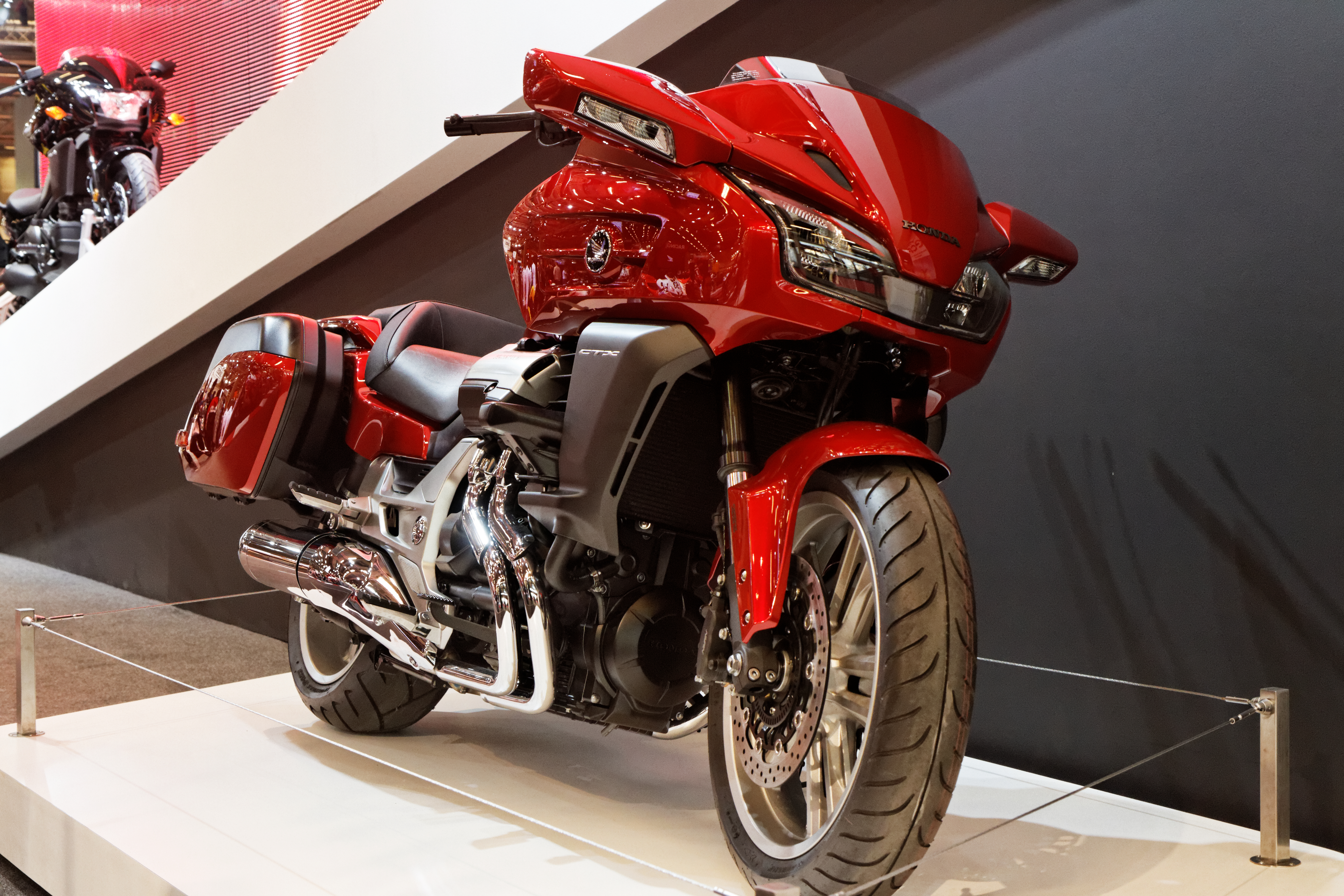
CTX1300

The Honda CTX1300 is a cruiser motorcycle with shaft drive and a longitudinally mounted V4 engine.

== Development ==
The CTX1300 succeeded the ST1300, (also called the "Pan-European" in Europe), which was discontinued after the 2012 model year. In November 2013, following deletion of the ST1300 model, Honda announced the CTX1300, which was powered by a version of the ST1300's engine modified for better fuel economy and increased torque at low RPM. Max torque was 78.19 ft/lbs (106.0 Nm) @ 4500 RPM. Claimed horsepower was 81.4 HP (60.7 KW) @ 6000 RPM.

Abandoning the Pan-European bias of the ST1300, the CTX1300 reverted to a North American theme, with its half-fairing, raked-back handlebar and bagger styling.

The CTX1300 was available in standard and "Deluxe" specification, the latter having traction control, ABS and Bluetooth.

== Reception ==
Well received in Australia and the US, European reviews of the CTX were mixed but positive overall.
