= Honda ST series =

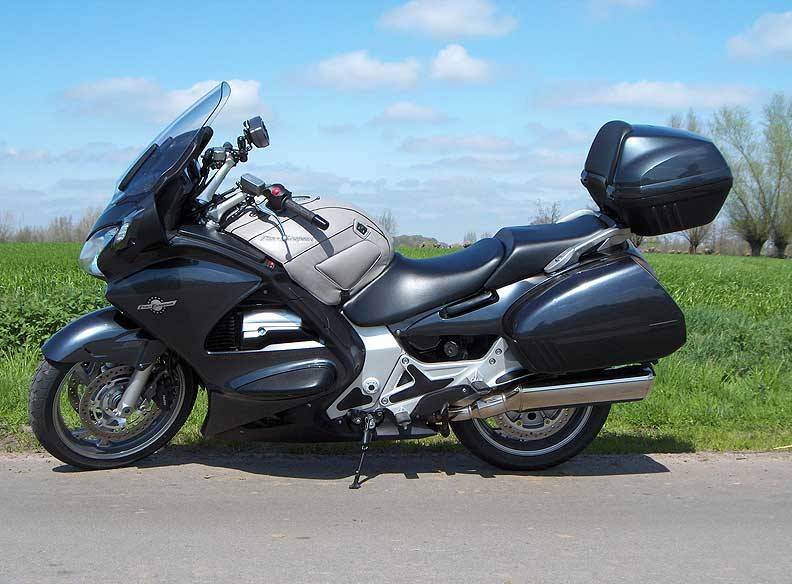
Honda ST1300

The Honda ST series, also known as the Pan-European in Europe, is a duo of Sport Touring motorcycles comprising the ST1100 and the later ST1300.

== History ==
Following the launch of the Gold Wing, which was very successful in the US, Honda's marketing team perceived that the European market (hence the "Pan European" moniker) would appreciate a lighter, sportier, and more manoeuvrable motorcycle. Introduced in 1990, the ST1100 was given a water-cooled 90-degree V4 engine mounted inline, instead of a flat-four engine (as in the Gold Wing). The ST1100 gained most of the Gold Wing's other characteristic engineering elements, such as shaft drive, a full fairing and integral panniers. Introduced to the European market a year before it was available in the United States, the ST1100 supplied within a sportier package the features required by touring riders, thereby filling a niche between the Honda VFR750F sports tourer and the larger Gold Wing.

Its successor, the ST1300, (also called the "Pan-European" in Europe), was introduced in 2002, becoming available in the US in 2003. Production continued through the 2012 model year. In November 2013, following deletion of the ST1300 from the model line, Honda announced the CTX1300, a cruiser motorcycle powered by a version of the ST1300's engine modified for better fuel economy and increased torque at low RPMs.

== ST1100 ==
Honda ST1100
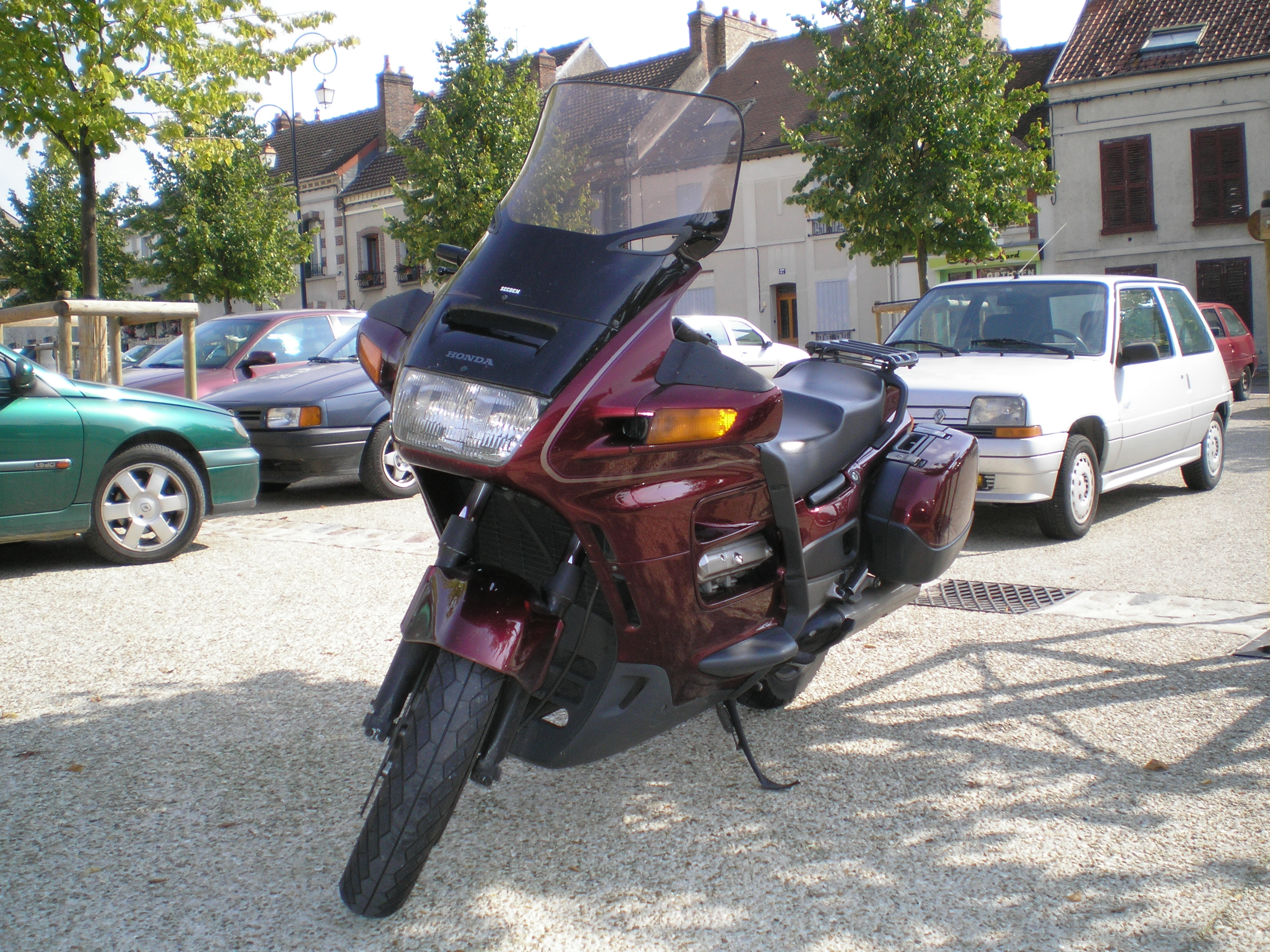
- Manufacturer: Honda
- Also called: Pan-European
- Production: 1990–2002
- Successor: Honda ST1300
- Class: Sport touring
- Engine: 1,085 cc longitudinal V-4; 4xCV carburetors w 34.5 mm throttle bore DOHC 4 valves per cylinder
- Bore / stroke: 73 mm × 64.8 mm (2.87 in × 2.55 in)
- Compression ratio: 10.0:1
- Power: 75 kW (100 hp) @ 8,500 rpm
- Torque: 107 N⋅m (79 lb⋅ft) @ 6,000 rpm
- Transmission: 5 speed, shaft drive Traction control system optional
- Frame type: Steel tube
- Suspension: Telescopic 43 mm (1996–2003 ABS model) 41 mm (1990–1995 ABS and all non-ABS models) front, 150 mm travel; adjustable rear shock, 120 mm travel
- Brakes: Linked; dual 3-piston hydraulic disk front; 3-piston hydraulic disk rear ABS optional
- Tires: Front: 120/70ZR18; Rear: 160/70ZR-17
- Rake, trail: 27.5 degrees / 101 mm (4.0 in)
- Wheelbase: 1,554 mm (61.2 in)
- Dimensions: L: 2,285 mm (90.0 in); W: 935 mm (36.8 in); H: 1,405 mm (55.3 in)
- Seat height: 800 mm (31.5 in)
- Weight: Standard 288 kg (635 lb); ABS 298 kg (657 lb) (dry); Standard 317 kg (699 lb); ABS 327 kg (721 lb) (wet)
- Fuel capacity: 28 L (6.2 imp gal; 7.4 US gal)

The ST1100 had a 1,085 cc longitudinal 90-degree V4 engine. The fuel tank was located below the saddle (the tank at the usual location is actually the cover for the air filter) to lower the center of gravity and thus improve the handling. It was manufactured by Honda between 1990 and 2002. A police variant, the ST1100P, was available for several more years.

The ST1100 was optimized for long-distance touring with the following features:

- A longitudinal V-4 engine layout with low maintenance shaft drive
- Optional anti-lock brakes (ABS) and traction control system (TCS). ABS model years from 1992 through 1995 have conventional separate front and rear braking systems. After 1996, ABS-equipped bikes have front-rear linked brakes (LBS).
- An exceptionally large 28 L (7.4 US gallon) fuel tank, giving a range of about 300 highway miles (480 km).
- A large 40 amp, air-cooled alternator to power multiple accessories such as auxiliary lighting and electrically heated clothing (Early models had a problematic 28 amp alternator which could be upgraded to the 40 amp version)

Weighing around 290 kg (640 lb), the ST1100 fits in the category of large touring bikes. The bike was fitted with wing-shaped tipover protectors projecting from the side of the lower part of the fairing. These would not only protect the bike and cylinder heads in a crash, but, should the rider drop the bike on its side, would prevent this very heavy bike from leaning over so far that it would be nigh impossible to pick up again; the panniers also helped in this matter. The ST1100 low-mounted rear-view mirrors were particularly effective.

== ST1300 ==
Honda ST1300
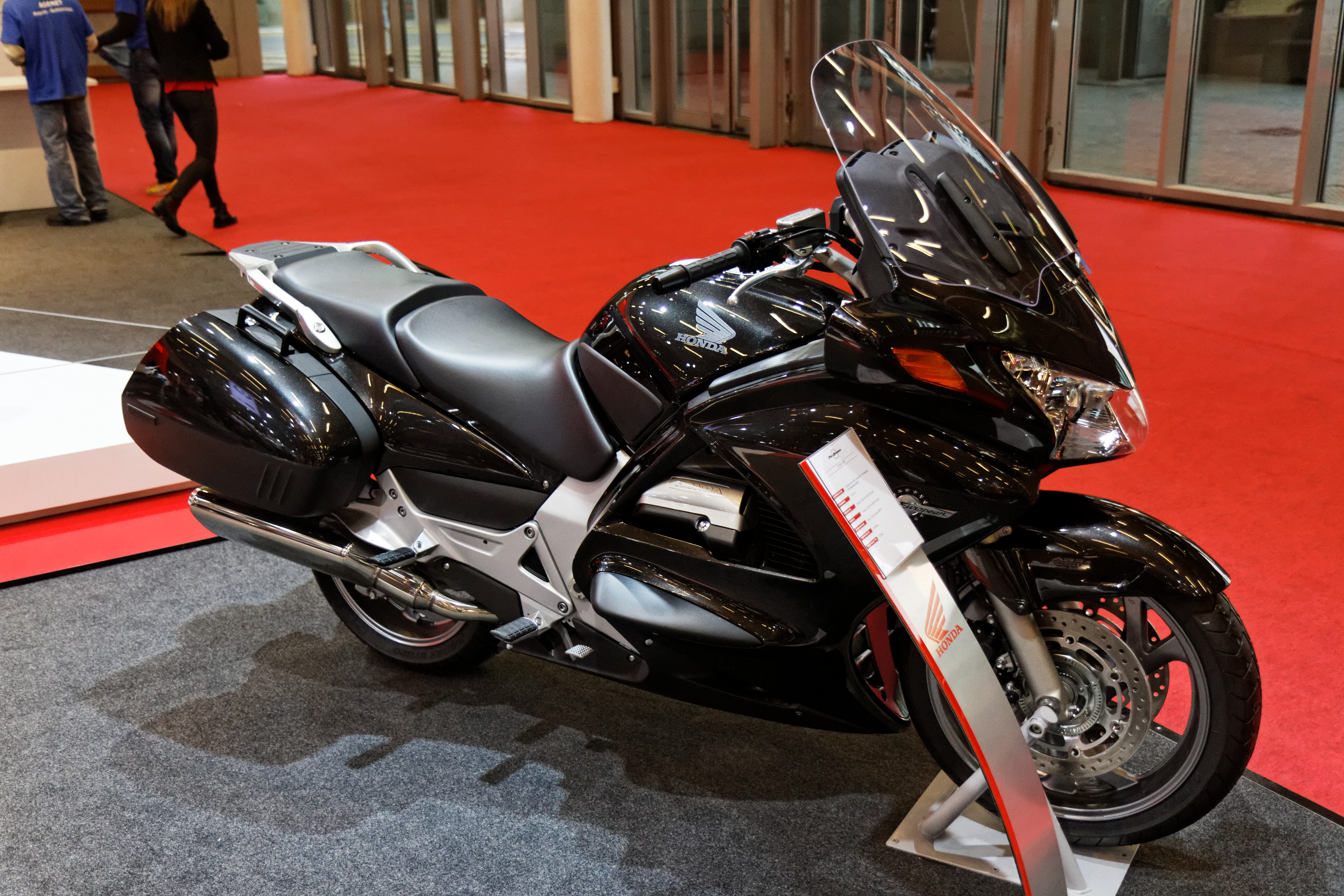
- Manufacturer: Honda
- Also called: ST1300 Pan European
- Production: 2002–2013
- Predecessor: Honda ST1100
- Successor: Honda CTX1300
- Class: Sport-touring
- Engine: Liquid-cooled 1,261 cc (77.0 cu in) longitudinal 90-degree V-4, chain-driven DOHC, 4 valves per cylinder, with programmed fuel injection
- Bore / stroke: 78 mm × 66 mm (3.1 in × 2.6 in)
- Compression ratio: 10.8:1
- Power: 117 hp (87 kW) @ 8,000 rpm
- Torque: 117 N⋅m (86 lb⋅ft) @ 6,500 rpm
- Transmission: 5 speed, shaft drive
- Frame type: Aluminum-alloy triple-box-section pressure cast dual-spar with cast aluminum-alloy swingarm
- Suspension: F: 45 mm cartridge fork, 108 mm (4.3 in) travel R: Gas-charged monoshock with five-position preload adjustment, 123 mm (4.8 in) travel
- Brakes: F: Dual hydraulic 310 mm 3-piston disk R: Hydraulic 316 mm 3-piston disk Dual Combined Braking System with ABS (optional prior to 2004)
- Tires: F: 120/70ZR - 18 radial R: 170/60ZR - 17 radial
- Rake, trail: 26.0 degrees / 98 mm (3.9 in)
- Wheelbase: 1,491 mm (58.7 in)
- Dimensions: L: 2,282 mm (89.8 in); W: 935 mm (36.8 in) (including panniers); H: 1,332 mm (52.4 in)
- Seat height: 790 mm (31 in) ± 15 mm (0.59 in)
- Weight: Standard 286 kg (631 lb); ABS 289 kg (637 lb) (dry); Standard 326 kg (719 lb); ABS 331 kg (730 lb) (wet)
- Fuel capacity: 29 L (6.4 imp gal; 7.7 US gal)

The ST1300 1,261 cc V4 engine had a cassette-type five-speed transmission and a two-element fuel-tank. The engine forms a stressed member in a lighter aluminum frame, the layout giving a low centre of gravity. Just like the ST1100 that it superseded, the ST1300 features a standard riding posture, a liquid-cooled longitudinal V4 engine with shaft drive and a fully faired body with integral hard panniers as standard.

During the 2000 bike show season, Honda presented a prototype sport tourer called the X-Wing, featuring a 1,500 cc V6 engine, single-sided front and rear suspension and an automatic transmission. Speculation in the press that the X-Wing was the ST1100's replacement was partially confirmed when Honda introduced an all-new ST1300 Pan European in Europe and Australia for the 2002 model year. For the U.S. market, the new bike would be imported in limited numbers (about 2,200 per year) starting in 2003 as the ST1300. Motor Cycle News reported in 2009 that Honda would replace the ST1300 with a new touring bike powered by a V4 engine mounted transversely, similar to the Honda VFR1200F layout. In 2011, Honda announced that development of the next generation Pan European motorcycle was on hold.

The ST1300 incorporates many of the X-Wing's lines but none of its running gear. Power comes from a lower-slung 1,261 cc V4 engine mounted as a stressed member in a lighter aluminum frame. A major difference from the ST1100 is the use of balance shafts for smoothness, allowing the engine to be directly mounted to the frame. The revised engine layout and a split fuel tank shift some of the weight downward, making the ST1300 less top-heavy than its predecessor. The rear wheel is driven through a cassette-type five-speed transmission and shaft drive.

Honda's ABS and linked brake package is an option for all years on the ST1300 in the United States, but became standard on the European ST1300 Pan European 2004 (A4 models). Unlike the ST1100, the ST1300 does not include a traction control system. In 2002 and 2003, models with ABS included an electrically adjustable windscreen. The electrically adjustable windscreen became standard equipment on all bikes in 2004. A long list of minor differences improved upon the ST1100's comfort, handling and performance.

=== Pan weave ===
Evidence indicates the ST1300 can exhibit a weave instability mode at high speed – known in the case of the ST1300 as Pan Weave.

In April 2007, subsequent to the death of a police motorcyclist riding a single seat ST1300, the emergency service version of the ST1300, a British coroner announced he would warn all Chief Constables in England and Wales of the "serious threat" to riders' lives posed by the ST1300 and the "catastrophic result" of the high speed weave. Later safety checks resulted in one examiner sustaining several broken bones in a similar incident. UK police forces subsequently withdrew the ST1300 from police service; London Ambulance Service continue to operate the ST1300.

RiDE Magazine reported in October 2007 that a team replicated weave instability mode with a civilian Honda ST1300 – reproducing the instability at a speed of 110 miles per hour (180 km/h) under certain loading conditions. The rider noticed a rear wheel maximum yaw of 11 degrees per second, described as "a consistent and alarming sideways movement." The editors named the behavior "Pan weave". The intent of the testing was not to determine the cause of the weave, but to confirm its existence. Also, the article reported that 43% of surveyed ST1300 owners had experienced the weave.

==== Honda's response ====
American Honda published an advisory in August 2007 on the proper selection, installation, and use of equipment on the ST1300PA police motorcycle. They made a strong recommendation to have "qualified personnel evaluate a motorcycle fitted with all intended equipment under the anticipated speeds and conditions before the vehicle is placed into service." The advisory also contained guidelines for the selection and installation of attachments, including:

- Place equipment as low and close to the center of the motorcycle as possible;
- avoid exceeding the maximum load limit for the vehicle;
- comply with weight limits for each saddlebag and fairing pocket;
- ensure attachments and equipment are balanced on both sides of the vehicle.

By 2010, the ST1300PA was again popular with police departments in the UK and in the US, competing with police bikes from Harley-Davidson, BMW, Kawasaki and Yamaha on price and performance. Britain's Automobile Association and other groups providing roadside assistance or emergency services have also chosen the ST1300 for their motorcycle fleets since 2010.

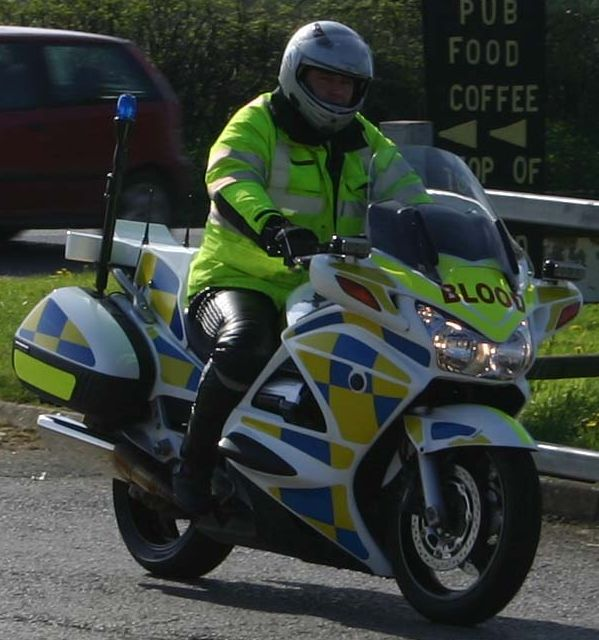
2002 ST1300P in emergency services configuration. Key differences are single seat plus blue lights & sirens.

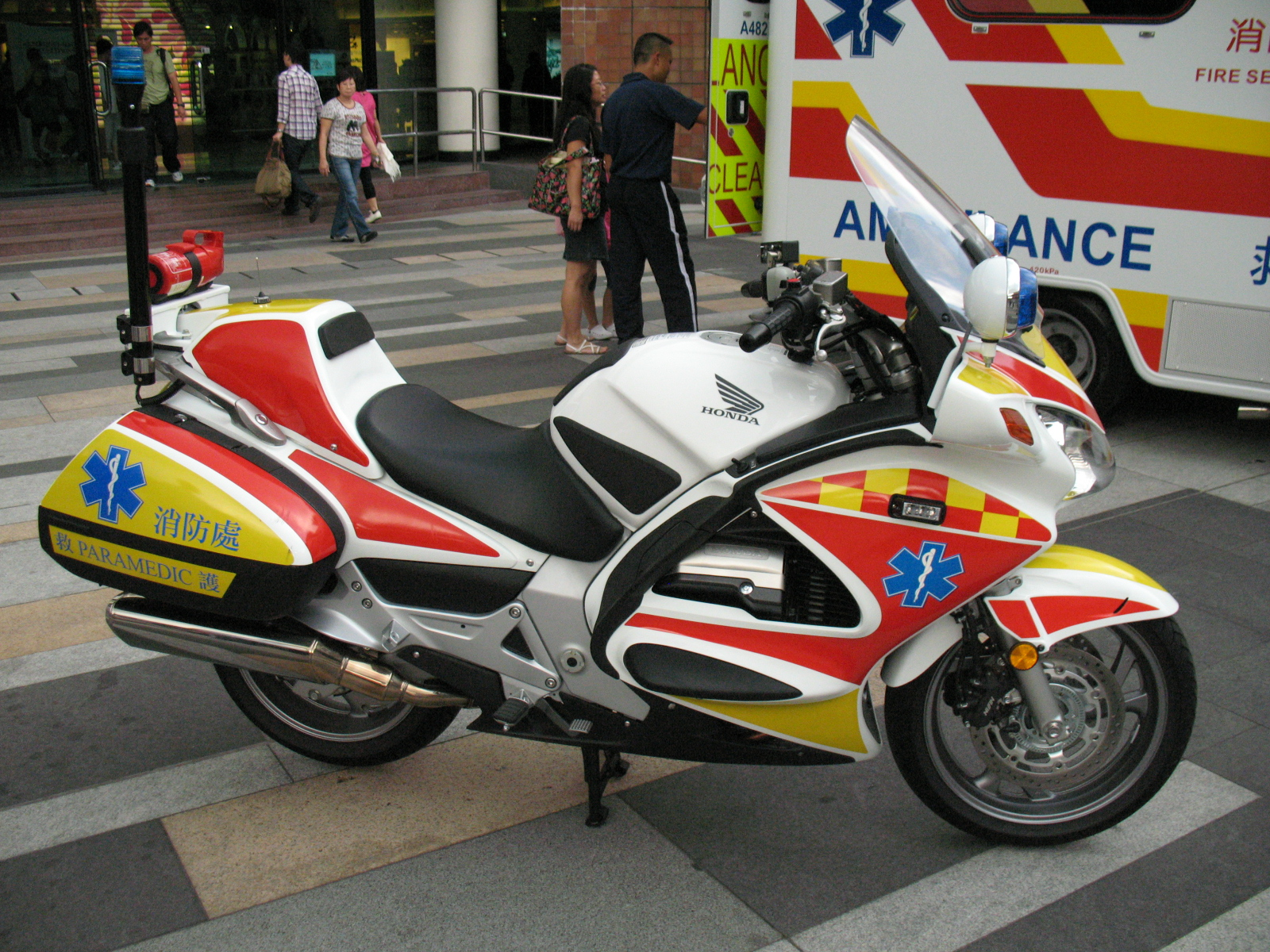
Hong Kong Fire Services Department Emergency Medical Assistant Motor Cycle

== See also ==
- List of Honda motorcycles
