= Honda VFR750F =

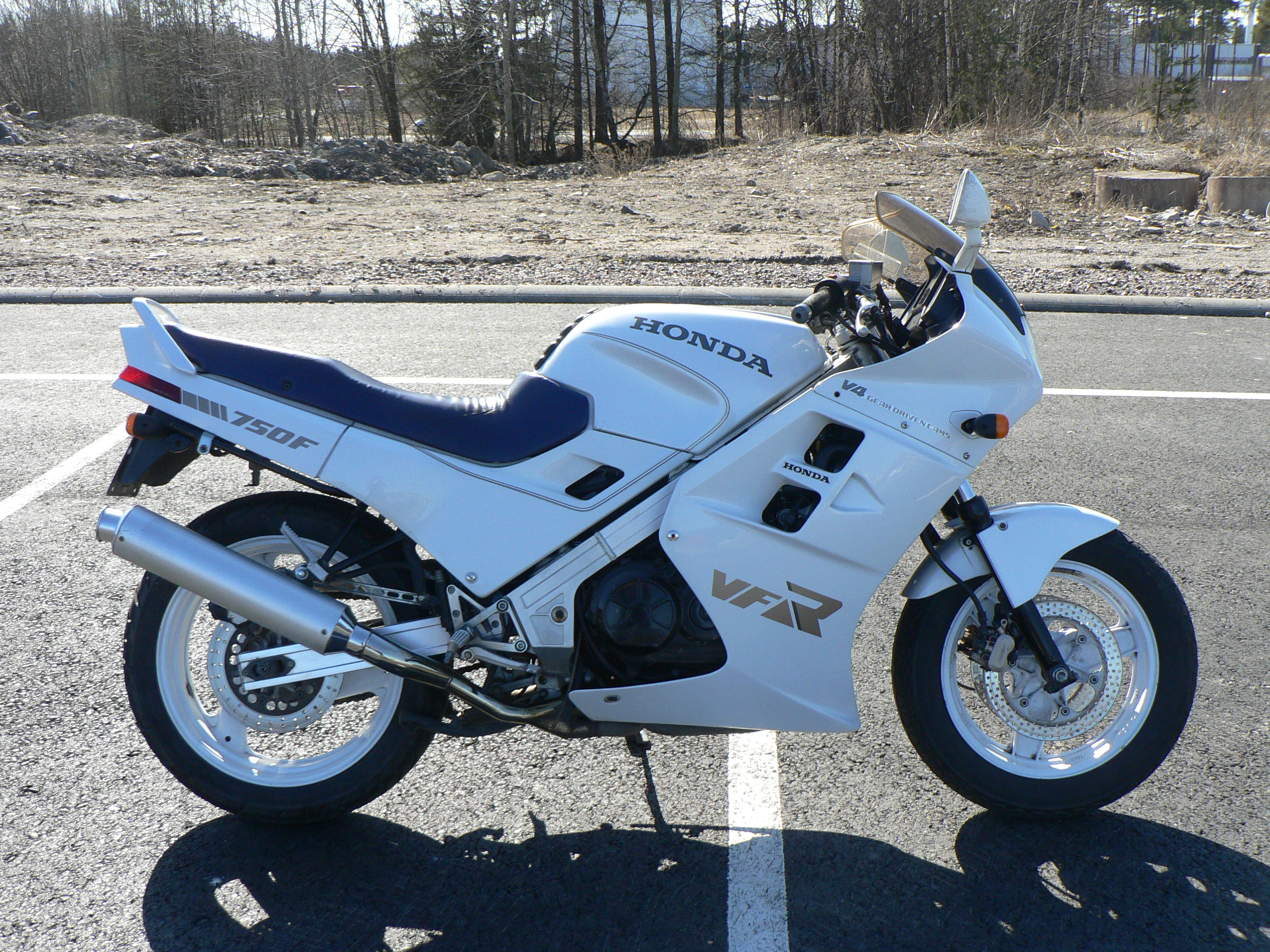
- VFR750 Mk.I (with differing diameter wheels)
- Manufacturer: Honda
- Also called: Interceptor
- Production: 1986–1997
- Predecessor: Honda VF750F
- Successor: VFR800
- Class: Sport bike
- Engine: 748 cc (45.6 cu in), liquid-cooled, DOHC, four-stroke, carburetted, V4 transverse engine
- Bore / stroke: 70 mm × 48.6 mm (2.76 in × 1.91 in)
- Brakes: Front: double disc Rear: disc

The Honda VFR750F is a motorcycle manufactured by Honda from 1986 to 1997. Initially conceived and released as a Sport bike it evolved to a Sports Tourer, powered by a 750 cc (46 cu in) V4 engine developed from the earlier VF750F models. The VFR was announced in 1986, after an initial press viewing at the 1985 Bol d'Or.

The previous VF700/750F models revealed Honda's new devotion to the V4 engine format, but the engines had proved unreliable because of the infamous "chocolate cams". Honda, having suffered a dent in its proven reputation for reliability, felt that the successor should be over-engineered to restore that damaged reputation; the resulting VFR was an exceptional and highly -regarded motorcycle.

Compared to its VF750F predecessor, the VFR has significant improvements:

- greater power output: 104 hp up from 83 hp
- lighter weight: 20 kg (40 lb) less
- a lower center of gravity
- a wider front tire
- shorter wheelbase: 15 mm (0.6 in) less
- six gear ratios
- gear-driven cams

== Engine ==
The Honda VFR750F uses a 16-valve 748 cc (45.6 cu in) liquid-cooled cast aluminium alloy 90° transverse V4 engine, with carburettor fueling, and gear-driven DOHC cams. Its crankshaft has a 180° throw, instead of the 360° crankshaft in the VF and VFR750R (RC30). The VF's bore and stroke of 70.0 mm × 48.6 mm (2.76 in × 1.91 in) was kept for the VFR.

The gear drive for the cams is located between the cylinders. Lubrication is wet sump with a chain-driven, dual-rotor oil pump and an oil cooler. The transmission was a constant-mesh 6-speed gearbox with a wet multi-plate clutch and chain drive to the rear wheel; (an exception was the 5-speed VFR750P, which had a spacer in place of one of the gears). Valve adjustment on first-generation VFR750Fs was by screw and locknut, which changed in 1990 to shim-under-bucket, along with the valve-clearance inspection interval to 16,000 mi (26,000 km).

Compared to the VF750, the VFR750F saw weight reduced from almost every component. Each connecting rod lost 90 g (3.2 oz), rocker arms 6 g (0.21 oz), the intake valve 0.5 g (0.018 oz), exhaust valves 1.5 g (0.053 oz), pistons 20 g (0.71 oz), piston rings 1.3 g (0.046 oz) per set and valve springs 17 g (0.60 oz) each.

The gear-driven camshaft system removed any concerns about cam chain maintenance, which had dogged the VF-series engines.

== Chassis ==
The 1986 VFR750F has an alloy twin spar frame which uses the engine as a stressed member. The cast aluminium headstock connects to the rear castings via 28 by 60 mm (1.1 by 2.4 in) hollow extrusions. (The VFR750F was said to be the first of the 750 class of bikes to have such a frame).

== Suspension ==
Front suspension on the RC24 Mk1 & Mk1a VFR750 comprised conventional Showa anti-dive 37 mm (1.5 in) telescopic forks; rear suspension used a dual-sided alloy swingarm with Pro-Link progressive linkage to a single central Showa shock absorber. Rear spring pre-load adjustment could be done remotely.

RC36 MkII VFR750 bikes had non-adjustable 41 mm (1.6 in) cartridge-style Showa front forks, a single-sided rear "Pro-Arm" swingarm with a remotely pre-load-adjustable Showa shock absorber. The suspension was later upgraded to include pre-load adjustment on the forks, and damping adjustment on the rear damper. The single-sided swingarm allows easy rear-wheel removal (with no need to remove the drive chain nor rear axle). Chain adjustment is similarly simplified. wheel alignment. On later RC36 VFR750Fs the "Pro-Arm" swingarm was modified to reduce weight.

== Models ==
The VFR750F was the successor to the VF750F, the new bike being a comprehensive redesign of the earlier model. The VFR750 appeared in the following iterations:

- VFR750F RC24 - in Mk 1 and Mk 1A versions
- VFR750P RC35 - Japanese-market-only police-specification model
- VFR750K RC37 - Japanese-market-only training model.
- VFR700F RC26 - a reduced-capacity VFR750F introduced to meet tariff restrictions in some states.
- VFR750RK RC24 - an HRC-prepared version of the RC24 for TT F1 and endurance racing
- VFR750F RC36 - the Mk II second generation VFR750, with a single-sided swingarm
- VFR750F RC36-2 - a much-modified RC36, with new frame, fairing and reduced weight

The RC30 and RC45 750cc V4 models were road-legal racing motorcycles, so comprehensively different from the standard VFR750 bikes as to be altogether separate entities:

- VFR750R RC30
- RVF750 RC45 - successor to the RC30

Production of the VFR750F ceased in 1997, its replacement being the fuel-injected VFR800Fi.

=== 1986–1987 — VFR750FG/H (RC24) ===
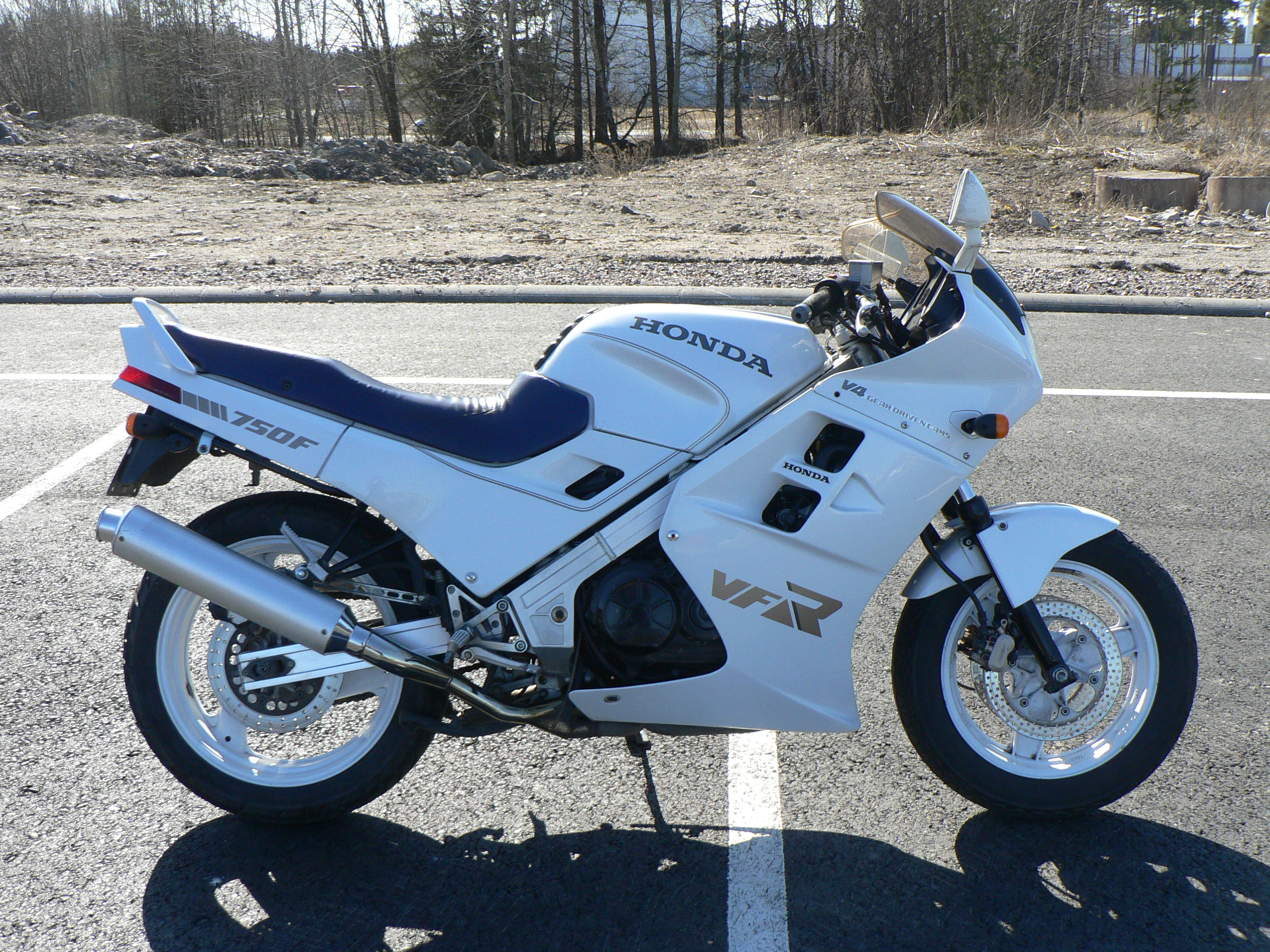
Honda VFR750F RC24

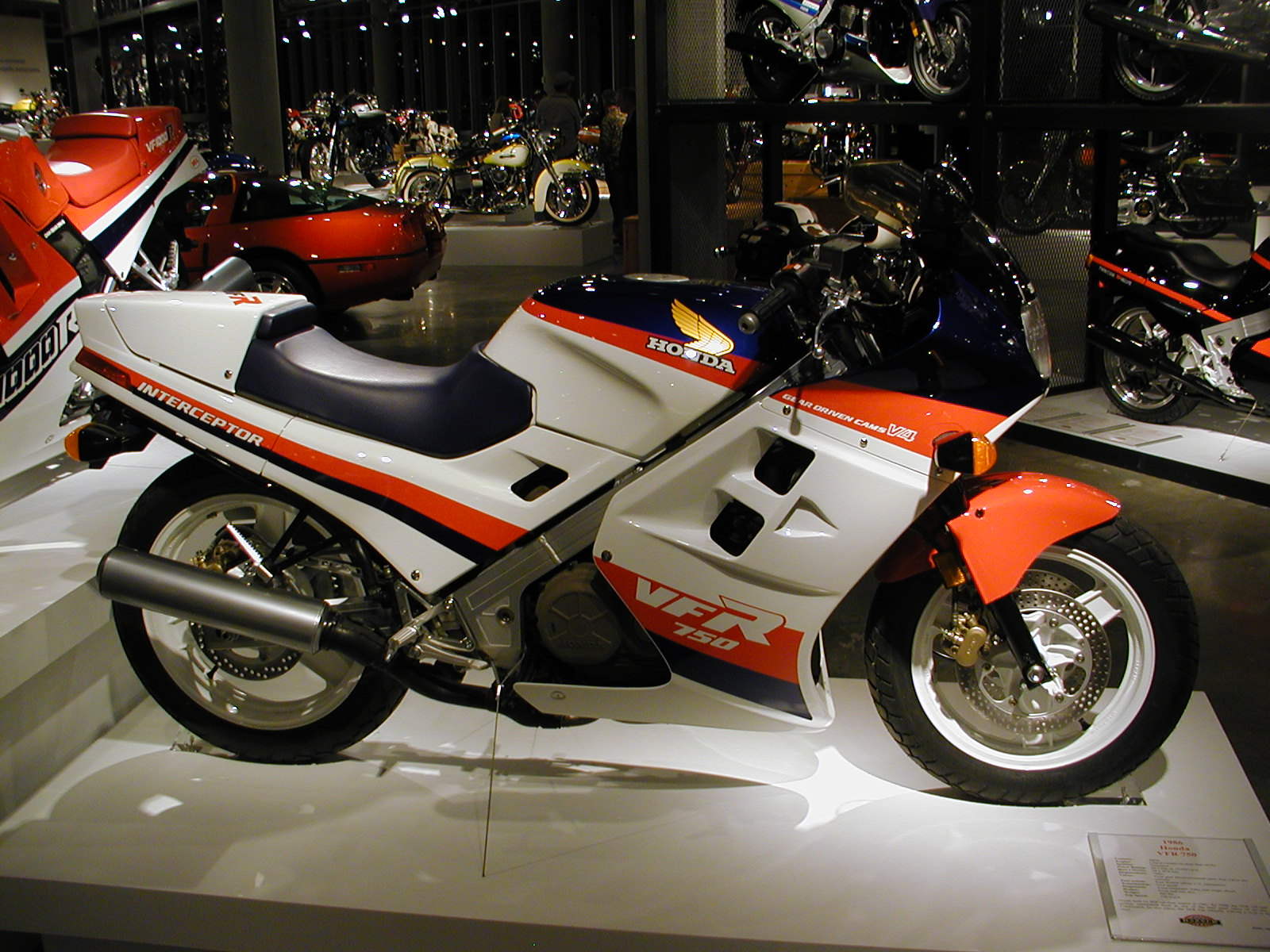
Honda VFR750F RC24

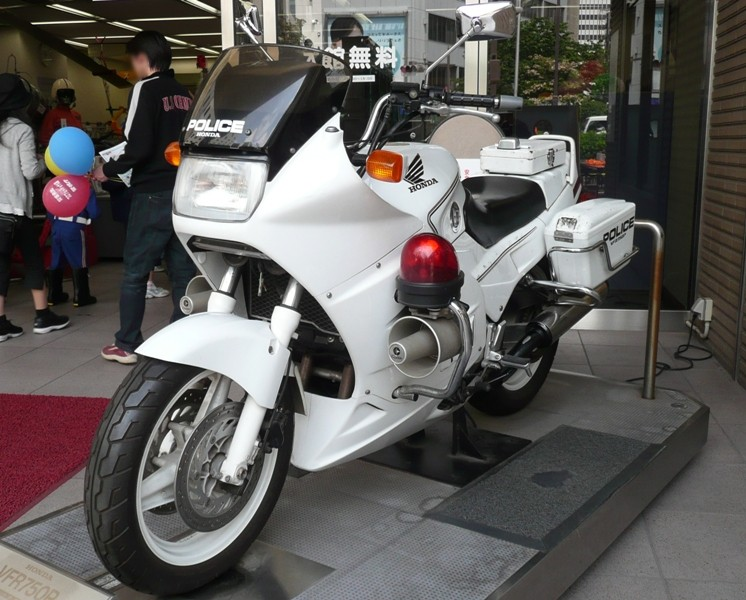
Honda VFR750P

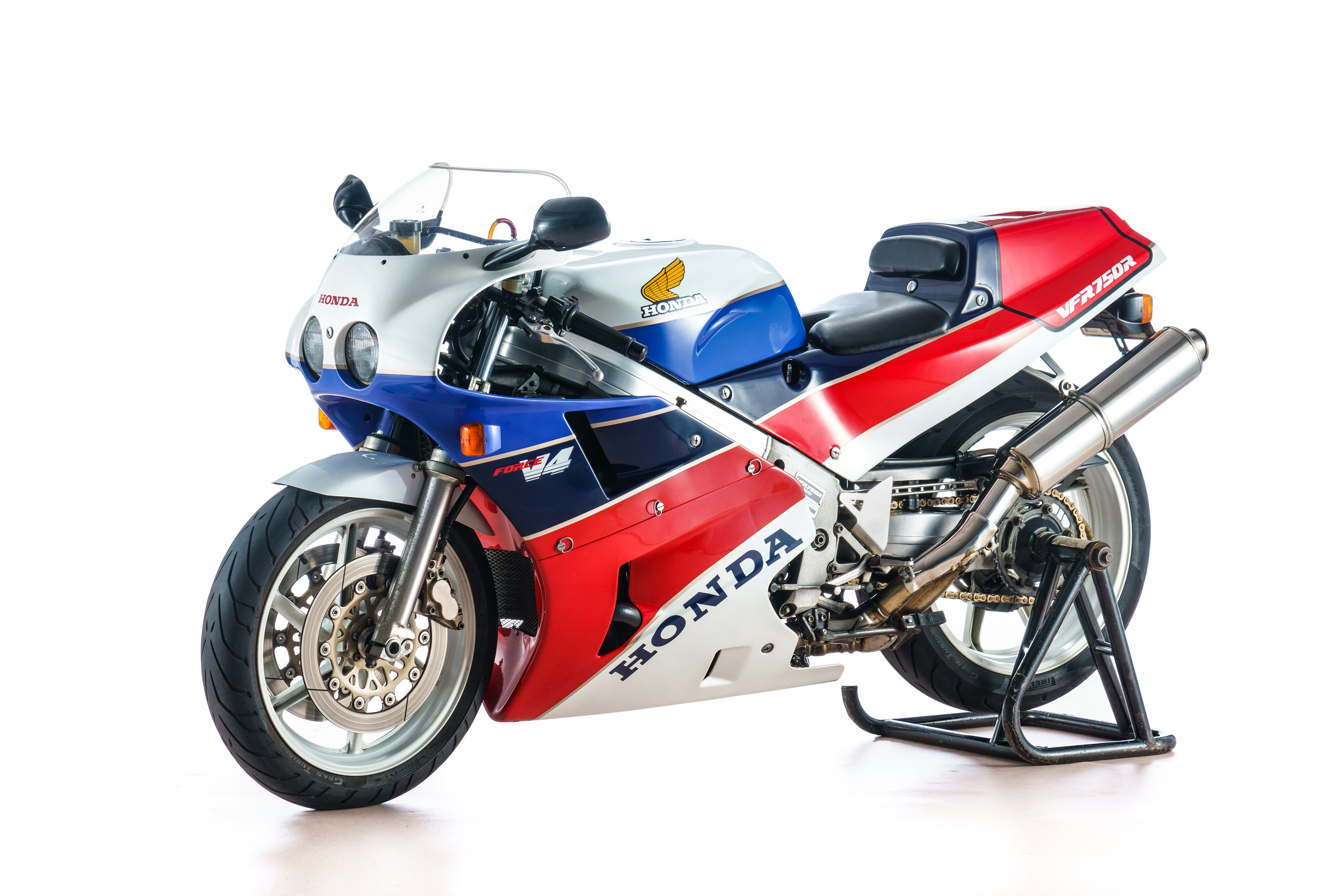
Honda RC30

The VFR750F (Mk1) was a completely new model (based on a thorough redesign of the VF750F) with a full fairing, alloy twin-spar frame, gear-driven camshafts, and 16-inch (41 cm) front and 18-inch (46 cm) rear wheels. The VFR750FG also had a cam sensor which was omitted from all later versions. US and Canadian models had round gauges while all other models had square gauges.

=== 1986–1987 — VFR700F / VFR700F2 (RC26) ===
The 700cc VFR700F "Tariff Buster" was introduced to meet Japan's home-market 700cc limit. Almost identical to its VFR750F sibling, it had a shorter stroke, different cams, altered ignition timing, an upgraded rear shock and fork internals, square instruments, and no "750" graphic on the lower fairing). The VFR700F was also sold in the USA.

=== 1986–1987 — VFR750RK (RC24) ===
Not to be confused with the VFR750R (RC30), the VFR750RK was the HRC race-kitted version of the VFR750F, designed for TT F1 endurance, and AMA Superbike racing. The HRC kit raised the claimed power output from 105PS@10500 rpm to 125PS@12000 rpm as a result of engine changes: new titanium rods (steel for AMA), pistons which raised compression to 11:1, and cams with larger valves (optional titanium for the inlet valves). A new ECU amended ignition advance by 5°. Carburetters could be were modified or (optionally) replaced altogether. Kit options included a new radiator, an optional secondary radiator, modified bodywork, wider wheels, upgraded suspension (forks, shock and linkage), and handlebars to replace the standard clip-ons.

=== 1988–1989 — VFR750FJ/K (RC24) ===
The 1988 MkIA VFR750 had several revisions, with fairing redesign from a two-piece to three-piece, a 2-position flip up screen, exhaust redesign, stronger fork legs (up to 41 mm [1.6 in] from 37 mm [1.5 in]) while retaining anti-dive on the left leg, a more reliable ignition system, and 17-inch (43 cm) wheels front and rear. Other changes included larger engine valves (for improved midrange) and larger carbs. The gearbox shift mechanism was upgraded to that on the VFR750R (RC30). A clock and fuel gauge instruments were added. Pillion footrest mounts were changed from being integral to the rear subframe to bolt-on cast aluminium assemblies. Larger frame castings reduced the amount of frame welding. Revised fairing side-panels allowed easier access to the engine, and the fairing cutaways for the rider's feet were much reduced in size. The change in wheel size allowed both a greater range of tyre options and a claimed improvement in handling. This model was not imported into the US.

=== 1990–1993 — VFR750FL/M/N/P (RC36) ===
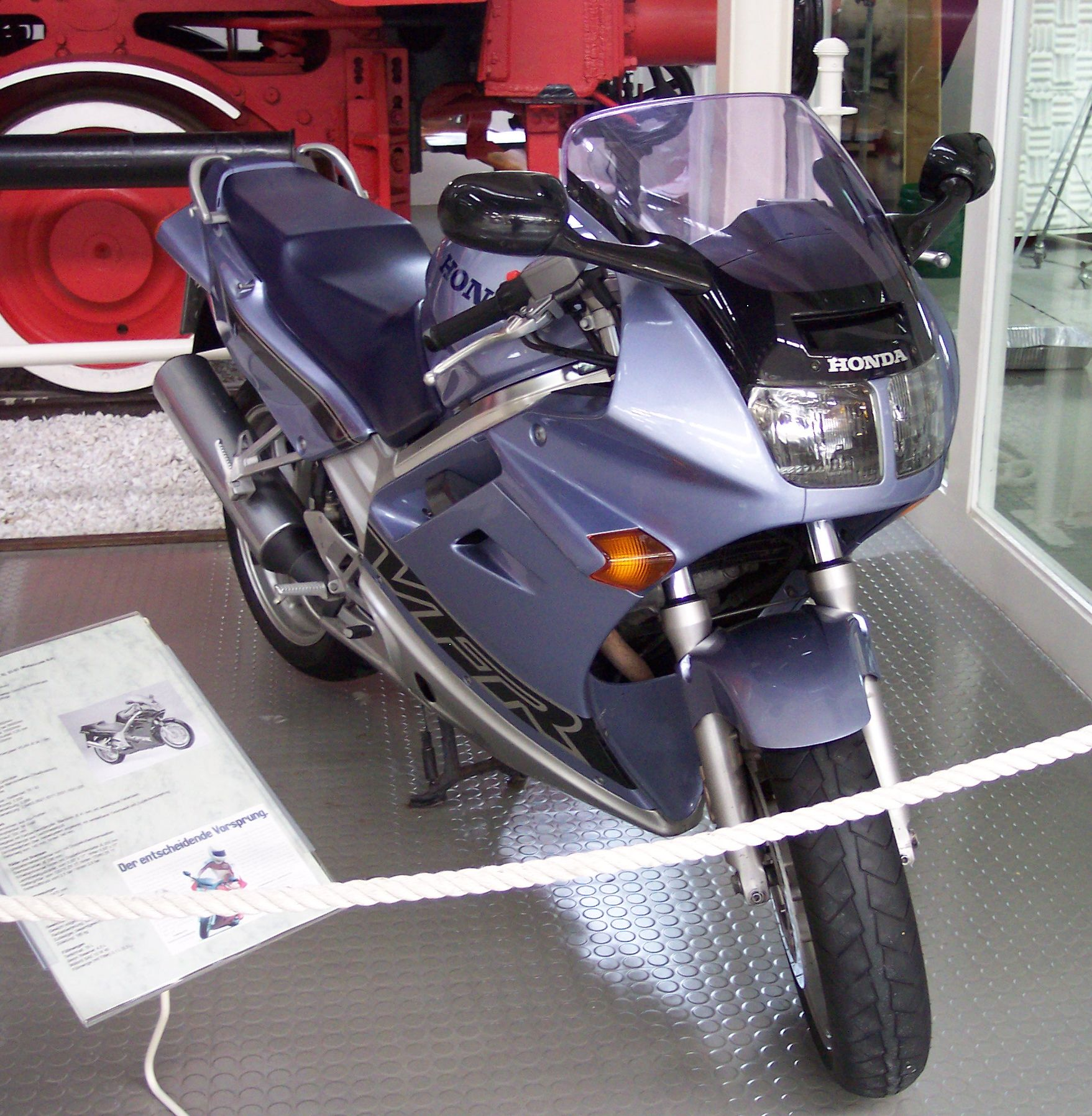
VFR750F RC36

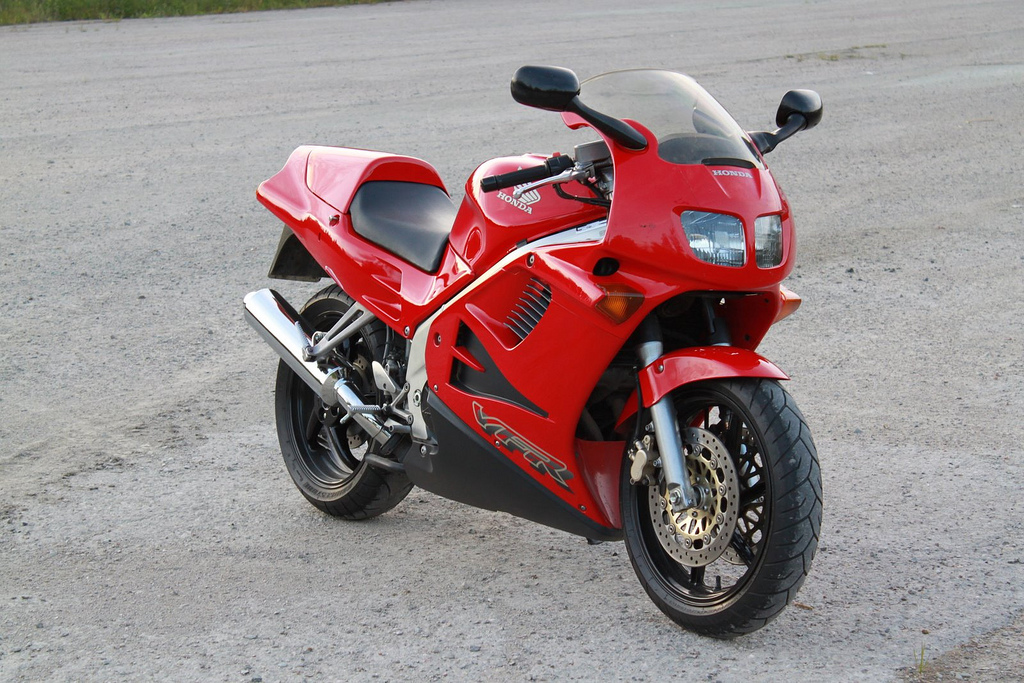
VFR750F RC36-2

The VFR750F MkII RC36 saw a major redesign with a new frame and a single-sided swingarm. New forks featured cartridge dampers, and wheels were widened to 5.5 inches (14 cm) for wider tires. Alas, weight increased by 17 kg (37 lb).

=== 1994–1997 — VFR750FR/S/T/V (RC36-2) ===
The MkII RC36-2 (the last of the VFR750F models before the introduction of the VFR800Fi in 1998) received some 200 modifications in 1994: a stylish new front fairing (not unlike the Honda NR750's) and a lighter alloy frame and swingarm. Other changes included different brakes, new wheels and silencer, a new riding position, adjustable rebound damping for the rear shock, a 10 kg (20 lb) weight reduction, and a larger capacity tank (increased from 5 to 5.5 gal (19 to 21 L)).

=== Japanese market only versions ===
Other VFR750F variants only for the Japanese domestic market included:

- VFR750P RC35 - A police-specification model restricted to 77ps (75 hp)and a five-speed gearbox, modified main stand, gear indicator, uprated alternator, crash bars, higher handlebars, and modified speedometer. This bike was not available to the general public.
- VFR750K - A naked style training version of the VFR750F in two versions: one (also called RC24) was based on the VFR750FG; the other, (designated RC37 and available to the general public), shared the RC35's restricted 77ps power engine. It had no oil cooler, and had different footrests, handlebars, crash bars, a modified centre-stand, and gear indicator.

== Specifications ==
Model year	1986–87				1988–89		1990–93				1994–97			
Models	VFR750F-G ('86)	VFR700F-G ('86) US Only; VFR700F2-G ('86) US Only	VFR750F-H ('87)	VFR700F-H ('87) US Only; VFR700F-H ('87) US Only	VFR750F-J ('89)	VFR750F-K ('89)	VFR750F-L ('90)	VFR750F-M ('91)	VFR750F-N ('92)	VFR750F-P ('93)	VFR750F-R ('94)	VFR750F-S ('95)	VFR750F-T ('96)	VFR750F-V ('97)
Model number	RC24	RC26	RC24	RC26	RC24		RC36							
PCN	ML7	MK8	ML7	MK8	ML7		MT4			MY7	MZ7			
Engine
Engine type	liquid-cooled 4-stroke gear driven cam 16-valve DOHC 90° V4													
Engine capacity	748 cc (45.6 cu in)	698 cc (42.6 cu in)	748 cc (45.6 cu in)	698 cc (42.6 cu in)	748 cc (45.6 cu in)									
Bore x stroke	70.0 mm × 48.6 mm (2.76 in × 1.91 in)	70.0 mm × 45.4 mm (2.76 in × 1.79 in)	70.0 mm × 48.6 mm (2.76 in × 1.91 in)	70.0 mm × 45.4 mm (2.76 in × 1.79 in)	70.0 mm × 48.6 mm (2.76 in × 1.91 in)									
Crank angle	180°													
Compression ratio	10.5:1				11:1									
Red line	11500 rpm													
Power (claimed)	104 hp (78 kW) @ 11,500 rpm		104 hp (78 kW) @ 11,500 rpm								100 hp (75 kW) @ 10,000 rpm			
Power (tested)	82.5 hp (61.5 kW) @ 10,500 rpm (rear wheel)													
Torque (claimed)							53.5 lb⋅ft (72.5 N⋅m) @ 8,000 rpm				53.9 lb⋅ft (73.1 N⋅m)			
Torque (tested)														
Fuel system	34.5mm Keihin CV				36mm Keihin CV									
Ignition system	Transistorised with cam sensor		Transistorised											
Engine weight (dry)	77.3 kg (170 lb)		77.3 kg (170 lb)		77.3 kg (170 lb)									
Chassis
Frame type	Aluminium twin beam using engine as stressed member						Twin Spar							
Frame weight	14 kg (31 lb)													
Front suspension	37 mm (1.5 in) air assisted telescopic fork with TRAC anti-dive				41 mm (1.6 in) air assisted telescopic fork with TRAC anti-dive		41 mm (1.6 in) Showa Cartridge telescopic fork				41 mm (1.6 in) Showa Cartridge telescopic fork			
Travel	140 mm (5.5 in)													
Rake	27°40'						26°							
Trail	108 mm (4.3 in)						100 mm (3.9 in)							
Rear suspension	Pro-link with remote hydraulic pre-load adjuster				Pro-link with remote hydraulic pre-load adjuster		Pro-Arm with Pro-link				Pro-arm with Pro-link			
Travel	105 mm (4.1 in)				105 mm (4.1 in)		130 mm (5.1 in)				130 mm (5.1 in)			
Front brakes	Twin 276mm discs with 2-piston sliding calipers				Twin 296mm discs with 2-piston sliding calipers		Twin 296mm discs with 2-piston sliding calipers				Twin 296mm discs with 2-piston sliding calipers			
Rear brake	Single 256mm disc with 2-piston sliding caliper													
Front tyre	110/90 V16-250 or 110/90 V16				110/80 V17-250		120/70 VR17-V250 or 120/70 ZR17				120/70 ZR17			
Rear tyre	130/80 V18-250 or 130/80 VB18				140/80 V17-250		170/60 VR17-V250 or 170/70 ZR17				170/60 ZR17			
Dimensions
Length	2,175 mm (85.6 in) Finland / Switzerland models 2,205 mm (86.8 in); Australia models 2,120 mm (83 in)						2,180 mm (86 in)				UK 2,100 mm (83 in) US 2,125 mm (83.7 in)			
Width	730 mm (29 in)						700 mm (28 in)				720 mm (28 in)			
Height	1,170 mm (46 in)				1,185 mm (46.7 in)									
Wheelbase	1,480 mm (58 in)						1,470 mm (58 in)							
Ground clearance	135 mm (5.3 in)						130 mm (5.1 in)							
Seat height	800 mm (31 in)													
Dry weight	198.1 kg (437 lb) (claimed)													
Curb weight (with oil and full tank)														
Fuel capacity	20 L (4.4 imp gal; 5.3 US gal)						19 L (4.2 imp gal; 5.0 US gal)				21 L (4.6 imp gal; 5.5 US gal)			
Oil capacity	With filter 3.1 L (0.68 imp gal; 0.82 US gal); Oil change only 3.1 L (0.68 imp gal; 0.82 US gal)													
Engine coolant capacity	2.63 L (0.58 imp gal; 0.69 US gal)													
Drive-train
Primary reduction	64/33 (1.9393)													
1st gear	37/13 (2.8461)													
2nd gear	33/16 (2.0625)													
3rd gear	31/19 (1.6315)													
4th gear	28/21 (1.3333)													
5th gear	30/26 (1.1538)													
6th gear	29/28 (1.0357)													
Final reduction	45/16 (2.8125)													
Final drive	#530 chain													
Performance
Measured top speed	151 mph (243 km/h)										152 mph (245 km/h)			
Standing 1/4 mile	10.95sec @ 113.95 mph										11.6sec			
0-60 mph	2.4sec													
45-70 mph	4th 3.76sec 5th 4.64sec 6th 5.20sec													
Braking 60-0 mph	118 ft (36 m)													
Range	189 miles (304 km)													
mpg	45 mpg_{‑imp} (6.3 L/100 km; 37 mpg_{‑US})													

Related models include the VFR400R (NC30), RVF400R (NC35), VF1000F/VF1000R (SC15/16/19/20), VFR750R (RC30), RVF750R (RC45), NR750 (RC40) and VFR800Fi (RC46).

== Race history ==
Although this particular model was not designed as a race bike, it has been used in various races. In 1986, British racer Ron Haslam took a standard VFR750F to third place in a soaked Transatlantic Challenge race at Donington Park, UK.

A modified, 'special' VFR750F called the '6X', a 135 hp@13000RPM 188 mph (303 km/h) full HRC prototype using, RVF cycle parts and containing titanium valves, magnesium cases and flat-slide carburettors, weighing 165 kg (364 lb) dry, less than the factory RVF that was first ridden by Wayne Gardner at a Suzuka test against TT F1 machinery. Wayne broke his four-stroke lap record by 1.5 seconds. Six examples of the '6X' were built, 4 for the Domestic Championships and two for the American Championships.

The VFR '6X' was raced at the Isle of Man TT by Geoff Johnson, coming in 2nd to Joey Dunlop in both the F1 and Senior TT.

In the United States, Fred Merkel and Wayne Rainey contested the 1986 AMA Camel Pro Championship, which at the time had both Superbike and F1 races but only one championship, with the best finish of the day counting. Merkel just rode in the Superbike while Rainey did the F1 as well. Merkel won two races and Rainey seven, but the championship was won by Merkel by two points.

For 1987 Merkel's bike was passed to Bubba Shobert who took 3rd place in 1987, being beaten by Wayne Rainey and Kevin Schwantz. The points he earned during the 1987 season gained him victory in the AMA Grand National. In 1988 Shobert won three of the seven races to win the AMA superbike championship.

The engine developed in the 6X became the basis for the factory racer, the VFR750R. A race kit was available for the 1986-87 VFR from HRC for US$4,000, this including a titanium exhaust and was known as the VFR750RK.

== See also ==
- List of Honda motorcycles
