= Honda VFR400 =

Honda VFR400R NC30
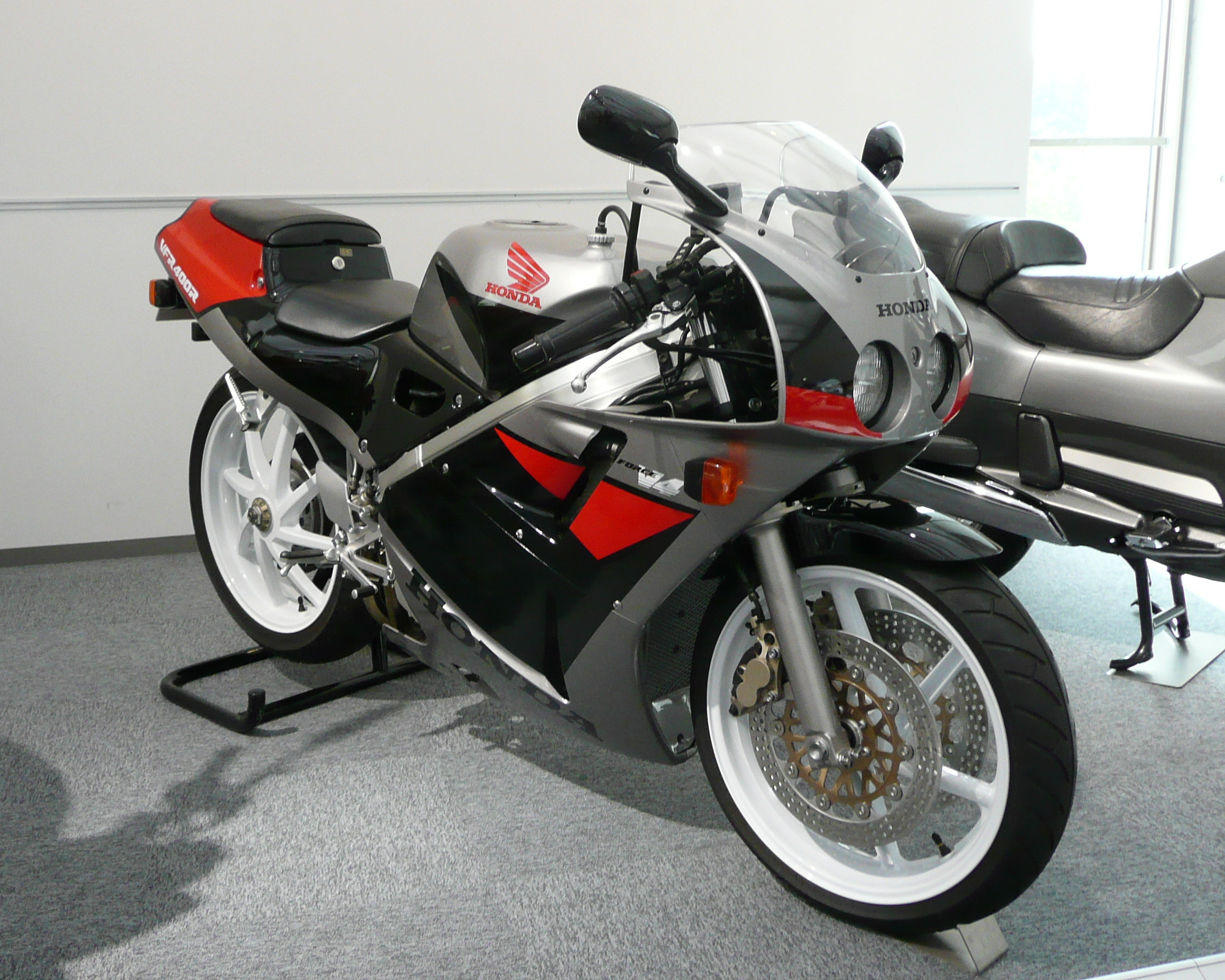
- Honda VFR400R NC30 1989
- Manufacturer: Honda
- Production: VFR400R NC21/NC24/NC30
- Predecessor: VF400 NC13
- Successor: RVF400R NC35
- Class: Sport bike
- Engine: 399 cc, 16-valve, four-stroke, V4 90°
- Bore / stroke: 55.0 mm × 42.0 mm (2.17 in × 1.65 in)
- Power: 59 hp (44 kW) @ 12500 rpm torque: 40 N⋅m (30 lbf⋅ft) @ 10000 rpm Rev limit: 13000 rpm (NC21) 14000 rpm (NC24) 14500 rpm (NC30)
- Ignition type: electric starter
- Transmission: 6-speed chain drive manual
- Frame type: Twin Spar Aluminum
- Suspension: Front tyre: 120/60R17; Rear tyre: 150/60R18
- Brakes: Front: dual discs with 4 piston calipers Rear: single disc with dual piston caliper (NC21), single piston caliper (NC24/30)
- Wheelbase: 1345 mm
- Seat height: 755 mm
- Weight: 164 kg (dry); 182 kg (wet)
- Fuel capacity: 15 L including 3 L reserve
- Related: Honda VFR750; Honda CBR400

The Honda VFR400 series of motorcycles were a related series of 399cc V4 motorcycles, which were essentially scaled-down versions of the larger VFR race models of the day. They were mainly developed for, and sold in, the Japanese domestic market, in part due to the tougher motorcycle drivers' license restrictions in Japan at the time for motorcycles with displacement exceeding 400cc.

Outside Japan, the VFR400R (NC30) was officially imported to the United Kingdom for four years. However the price tag of £5899 was similar to that of the 1000 cc bikes of the time and more than Honda's own VFR750F and it failed to sell well. It was also officially imported (albeit in very limited numbers) and sold in Austria, France and Germany for a few years.

Although mainly produced for the Japanese domestic market, VFR400s have been popular as grey imports in other regions (especially so for the NC30 in the United Kingdom, and also for racing purposes in the United States) in the "mini" superbike segment.

VFR400 engines produce a noticeable whine when the engine is running, due to the cams being driven by straight cut gears, rather than chains or belts.

== Model history ==
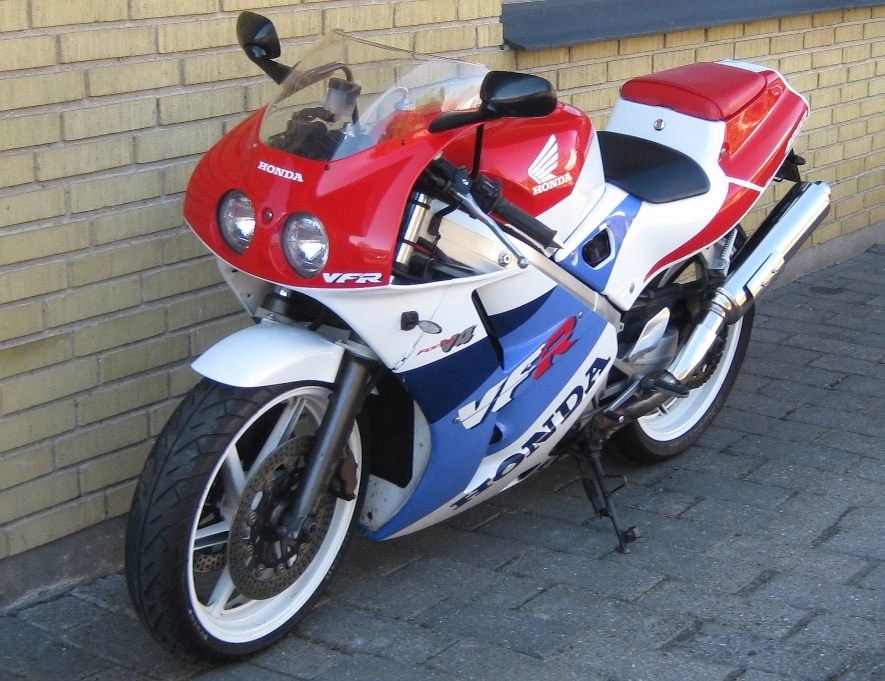
1990 Honda VFR400R NC30

The first generation of VFR400 was the 1986–1987 NC21, which had replaced the VF400F when the Honda VF series was phased out (mainly due to reliability issues with the head and cam chain).

This model came in 4 designations, "R", "Z", "K" and a police version with the "P" designation. The "R" model (VFR400R) was the most common. Multiple colour schemes were also available for each. The "R" had a full fairing and single headlight. The "Z" model was semi faired (side fairings and belly pan) and had 2 round headlights. The "K" and "P" both had a single round headlight and bar risers to give a more upright riding position.

All had a single piece seat for rider and pillion, 3 spoke cast wheels (16" front and 18" rear), an aluminum frame with steel rear subframe, and a conventional dual-sided aluminum swing arm with single shock. The clutch was hydraulically actuated and the front left fork featured Hondas TRAC (Torque Reactive Anti-dive Circuit) system with adjustable damping on the right fork. This had 4 stage adjustment on the bottom of the fork. Both forks featured air assist. The engine was a 180° degree crank firing version, and had a rpm redline of 13000rpm on the "R" and "Z", the "K" and "P" had a redline of 14000rpm. A small number of NC21s (VFR400R) were imported new into New Zealand in 1987.

The 2nd generation of VFR400 was the VFR400R NC24, produced for the 1987 and 1988 model years, it was one of the first production Honda motorcycle to utilize an ELF-designed Pro-Arm single-sided swingarm (which later became one of the trademarks of the Honda VFR series). Discontinued with this model were the hydraulically actuated clutch which was switched back to a cable system, and while the TRAC anti dive system on the front left fork was retained, it was not adjustable. The cast wheels were updated to 8 spoke rear and 6 spoke front. Styling remained close to the NC21, with both having the same aluminium frame and with the NC24 keeping the VFR400R NC21's single large headlight and the exhaust silencer on the right side although the silencer was mounted higher up. The seat was changed to a separate seat for the rider and pillion each. This model also had the 180° deg crank firing engine as with the NC21, but redline was raised to 14000 rpm and the CDI dropped the cam position sensor input that the NC21 used. The NC24 was available in three colour schemes in 1987 (including an official Rothmans replica), and one in 1988. Note that the rear wheel on the NC24 was held onto the hub with 4 bolts (sometimes hidden with a plastic 'fake' single nut).

The third generation of VFR400R was the best known version, the VFR400R NC30. This saw styling changes, most notably the headlights were updated to smaller twin headlights, much the same as the RC30, and relocation of the silencer to the left side, which gave a more open look to the rear wheel on the right side. This model saw the introduction of the 360° crank firing engine, which is also known as the "big bang" engine. The tachometer red-line was also raised to 14500 rpm. The NC30 was also officially sold in limited numbers in several European countries. The official European models were sometimes installed with a different CDI (ignition device), no 180 km/h (110 mph) restriction, speedometer that reached to 240 km/h (150 mph) and larger headlights (Germany) and were rated at 65 hp. The NC30 was produced between 1989 and 1992, though unsold bikes were still available to purchase from Honda dealers for several years thereafter. The NC30 reflected the styling of its iconic bigger brother, the VFR750R (RC30), right down to its 18-inch rear wheel. Front wheel changed from the 16" on the NC21/24 to a 17" on the NC30. Japanese-spec NC30s were available in a total of eight different colour schemes, produced with three different model year specifications (1989, 1990 and 1992). Export models were made in two different colour schemes, and carried model year designations L and M (1990 and 1991).

The official UK model has the following distinguishable features: slightly larger front and rear direction indicators; additional rear number plate light (separate from rear lamp) oil cooler, 60/55 watt headlamp bulbs, and a MPH speedo. The official UK bikes were only ever available in two colour schemes.

It is an beginners bike. It has a large fanbase, especially in Japan and the UK, where it’s popular for track days and racing.

=== Successors ===
As the RC30 was eventually replaced by the RVF750R (RC45), the VFR400R NC30 evolved into the RVF400R NC35, which was produced between 1994 and 1996. This model featured inverted forks and an updated racing-style fairing.

== Speed restriction ==
In the Japanese market, 400 cc motorcycles were once restricted by top speed, but these restrictions can be removed through various means, including the fitting of an ignition "black box". The VFR400R is restricted by means of an optical sensor inside the speedometer, and a black sector attached to the indicator needle shaft. When needle swings round to 180 km/h (110 mph) the sector starts to block the sensor, ignition is cut to the front two cylinders thereby reducing power such that the motorcycle can not accelerate further.

Some models also had power restrictions, this was most commonly a restriction washer in each of the rubber sections between the carburators and cylinder inlet.

== Technical specifications ==
=== Performance ===
- Top speed: 180 km/h (110 mph) limited (Japanese version)
- Acceleration: 0-100 km/h (62 mph): 5.0 s
- Braking: 100 km/h (62 mph) - 0: 4.5 s
- Acceleration + Braking: 0–100–0 mph: 22.1 s (as claimed by Performance Bikes magazine)

== See also ==
- Honda VFR800
- Honda RVF400
- Honda VF and VFR
