= Honda VF400F =

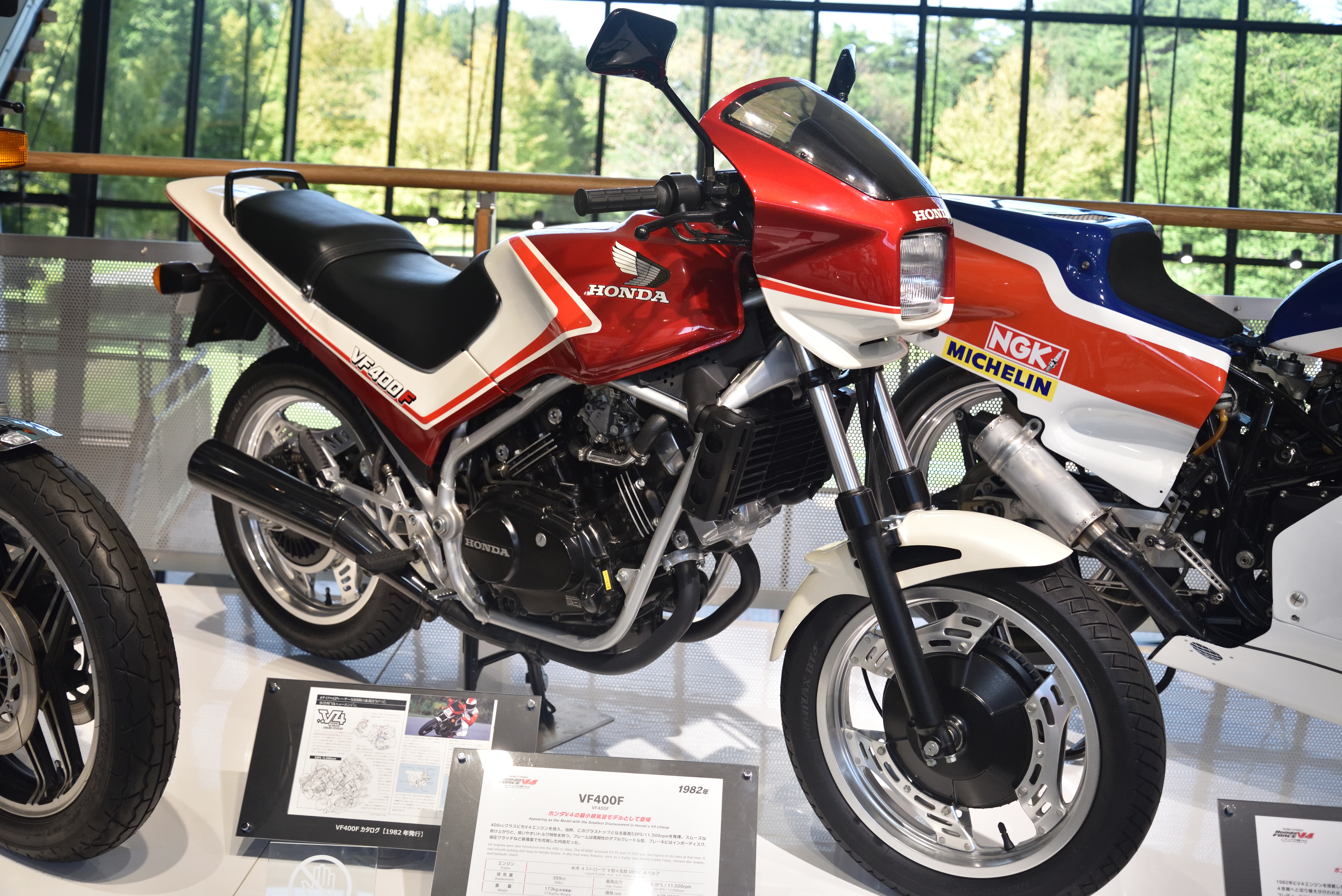
- 1982 VF400F
- Manufacturer: Honda Motor Company
- Production: 1982–1983
- Successor: Honda VFR400
- Class: Standard
- Engine: 399 cc (24.3 cu in), 16 valve, four stroke, liquid-cooled, V4 90°
- Bore / stroke: 55 mm × 42 mm (2.2 in × 1.7 in)
- Compression ratio: 11:1
- Ignition type: CDI Full transistor
- Transmission: 6-speed chain drive manual
- Brakes: Single disc, front and rear
- Tires: Front: 100/90-16; Rear: 110/90-18
- Wheelbase: 1,415 mm (55.7 in)
- Dimensions: L: 2,060 mm (81 in); W: 750 mm (30 in); H: 1,160 mm (46 in)
- Seat height: 780 mm (31 in)
- Fuel capacity: 17 L (3.7 imp gal; 4.5 US gal)

The Honda VF400F (NC13) is a naked or standard motorcycle with a 400 cc (24 cu in) four-stroke V4 engine produced by Honda in 1982 and 1983. It had inboard ventilated disc brakes, Honda's torque reactive anti dive control (TRAC) system and air-assisted front and rear suspension.

== See also ==
- Honda VF and VFR
- List of Honda motorcycles
