= Honda RVF750 RC45 =

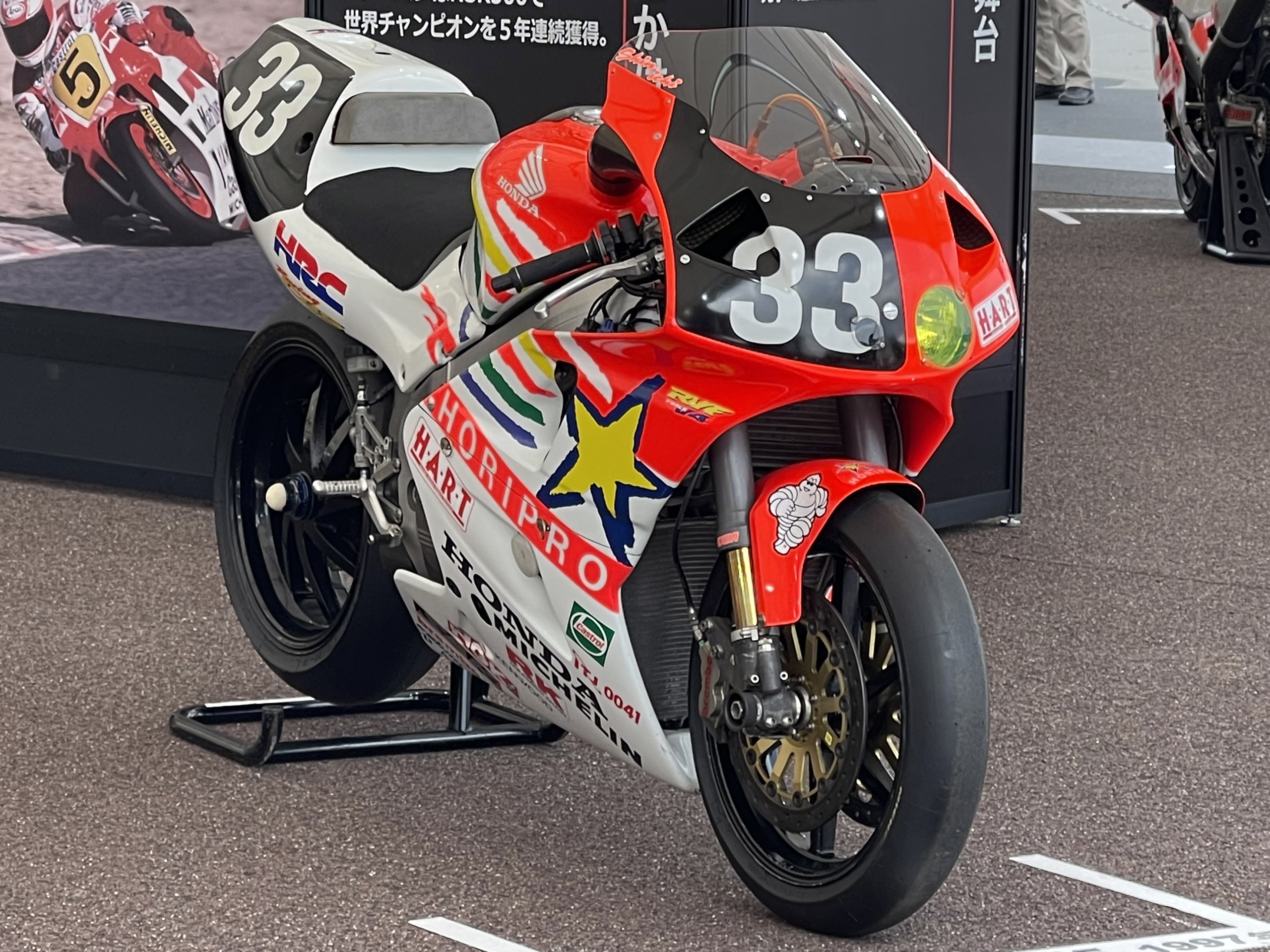
- 1997 RVF750 RC45
- Manufacturer: Honda
- Production: 1994–1999
- Engine: 749.2 cc (45.72 cu in) Four stroke, Liquid cooled, 90°V-four cylinder, DOHC, 4 valve per cylinder.
- Bore / stroke: 72 mm × 46 mm (2.8 in × 1.8 in)
- Compression ratio: 11.5:1
- Top speed: 259 km/h / 161 mph
- Power: 119 hp / 87.6 kW @ 12000 rpm (109.2 hp @ 11900 rpm)
- Torque: 75 Nm / 56 lb-ft @ 10000 rpm
- Ignition type: Digital transistorized electric advance
- Transmission: 6 Speed
- Frame type: Diamond aluminum twin spar
- Suspension: Front Suspension:41mm USD forks adjustable compression rebound and preload Rear Suspension:Pro-link adjustable compression rebound and preload
- Brakes: Front Brakes:2x 310mm discs 4 piston calipers Rear Brakes:Single 220mm disc 2 piston caliper
- Wheelbase: 1407 mm / 55.3 in
- Dimensions: L: 2110 mm / 83.0 in W: 710 mm / 27.9 in H: 1100 mm / 43.3 in
- Seat height: 770 mm / 30.3 in
- Weight: 189 Kg / 416.7 lbs (dry); 215 kg / 467.3 lbs (wet)
- Fuel capacity: 18.0 Litres / 4.0 gal

The Honda RVF750R RC45 was a fully faired racing motorcycle created for homologation purposes for the Superbike World Championship by Honda Racing Corporation.

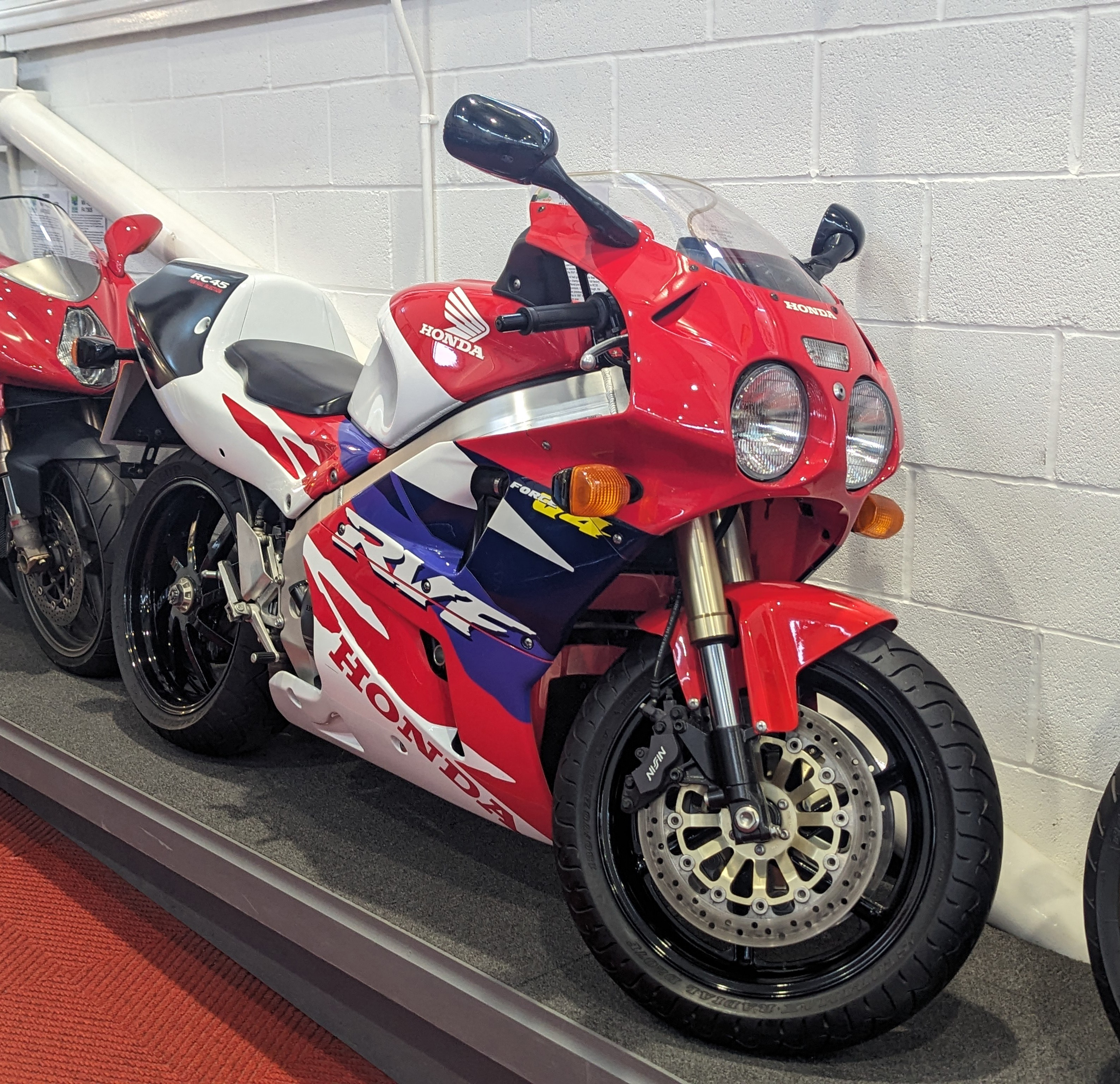
1995 Honda RVF750R

The RVF750R was the successor to the VFR750R RC30 (not to be confused with the sport touring VFR750F). Like its predecessor, the RVF750R featured a DOHC liquid-cooled V4 4-stroke engine with gear driven cams and a single-sided swingarm, but unlike the RC30 it utilized electronic fuel injection, in a setup very similar to the production 1992 NR750. The US spec engine had a 749.2cc capacity and was rated at 101 horsepower; the European version was rated at 118 horsepower. A simple rewire modification to the PGM-FI box increased power in the US engine up to the 118 hp. It was manufactured from 1994 until 1995 and sold in limited numbers (the United States receiving the model for its first year only), followed by the VTR1000R SP-1 RC51 in 2000. Unlike the VFR750R RC30 and VFR750F from which the engine was originally derived the gear drive for the cams was moved from the centre of the engine in between the cylinders to the one side allowing a slightly narrower engine.

== History ==
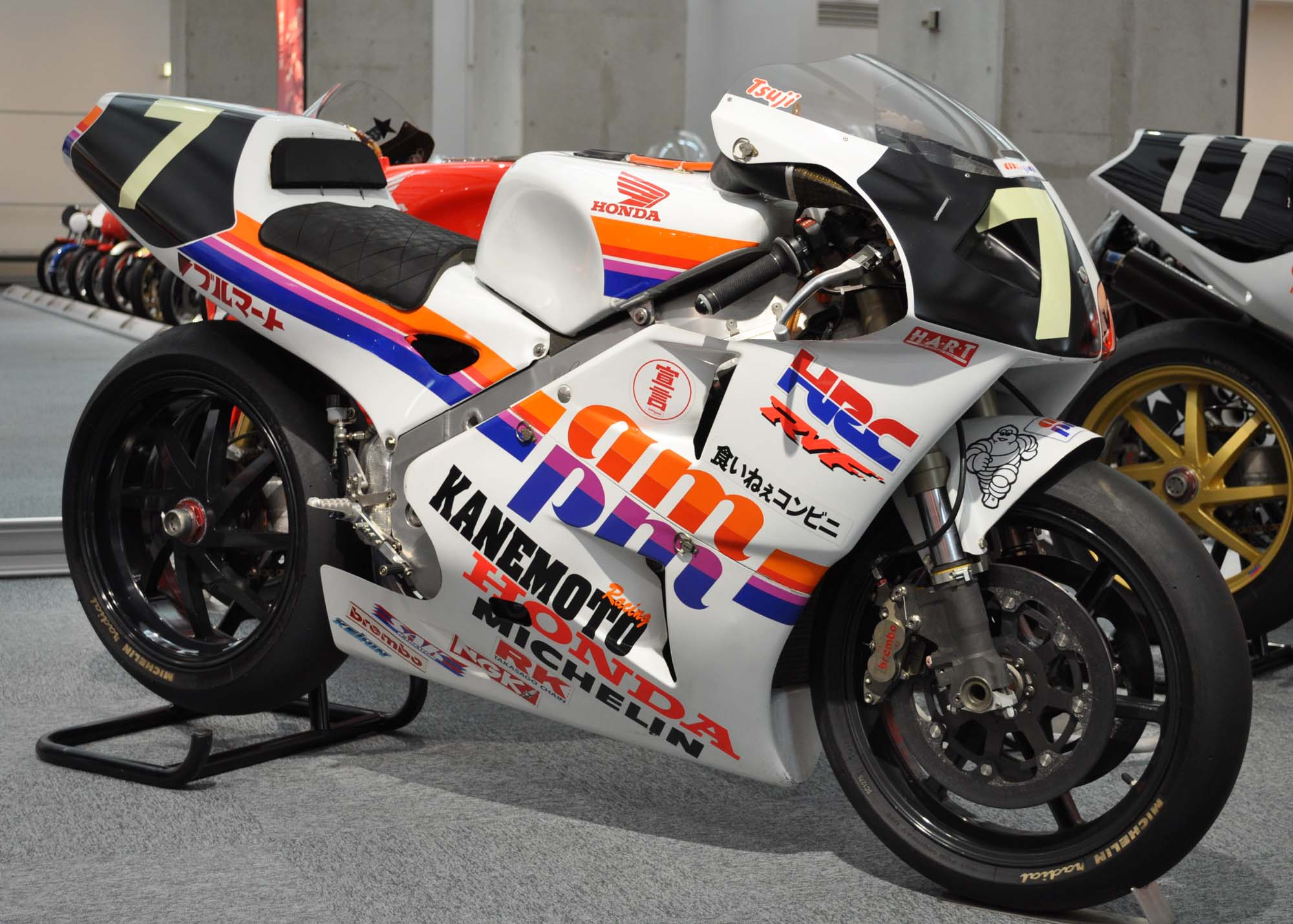
1994 Honda RVF750

The RC45 has its roots from the original 1982 Honda V-45 V-four 750 engines introduced on the 1982 Honda Magna and Sabre models. Then in 1986, the 2nd generation V-four arrived in the form of the VFR750F (RC24), fixing the camshaft problem that plagued the original V-four and moving to gear driven cams. In 1988, the RC30 was born, loosely based on the RVF endurance racer, and this was used to contest the newly formed Superbike World Championship. Only 300 were imported into the US for only one year, 1990. Then, in 1994, with the RC30 showing its age and being handily beaten by the Ducatis, Honda redesigned the RC30 using more of the technology from the RVF endurance racer and released the RC45 to much fanfare. Only 200 were manufactured worldwide and per AMA homologation rules 50 were imported into the US, with approximately 20 of them going to private race teams; it is estimated only 20 examples are left in the US. It is one of the rarest motorcycles produced by Honda. In its peak race form, in 1999, the RC45 made over 190 hp, with some calling it the best Superbike machine ever. Later in its career HRC heavily modified the bike to keep it competitive including new exhaust systems and switching back to a standard two-sided swingarm for increased strength on non-endurance bikes. The RC51 was released in 2000 to make use of the 250cc displacement advantage for V-twin motorcycles that allowed the Ducatis to be so competitive.

The RC45 was shadowed with problems when first released on the World Superbike championship. This did not bode well with Honda, who entered the World Superbike championship with full factory support, not just privateer support that they gave to teams with the RC30. Castrol was the major sponsor of the RC45, and Honda came to win. The RC45 only won one World Superbike championship with American John Kocinski when he won the 1997 FIM Superbike World Championship. Jim Moodie from a standing start, on an RC45 Honda lapped in 18:11.4 seconds, 124.45 mph in the 1999 Isle of Man TT. Miguel Duhamel won the 1995 US AMA Superbike and the 1996 Daytona 200 on an RC45. Miguel came in 2nd in 1996 and 2nd again 1997 on the RC45, then a season ending crash in 1998 injured his leg. However, Ben Bostrom won the 1998 AMA Superbike Championship on an RC45. The bike was used to win the Endurance FIM World Championship six times between 1984 and 1998. Michael Rutter won the 1998 Macau Grand Prix.

The RVF400R (NC35) closely resembles the RVF750R (RC45) with the exception of the headlights, which are large and round on the 750.

The Honda RC45 followed the RC30. The RC30 was a hand-built race bike available at a cost accessible to club racers. While the RC30 won two World Superbike titles, it also competed at levels previously dominated by works bikes.

With the RC45, Honda drew on its extensive knowledge of racing the RC30 and factory RVF racers. Many engineering ideas were brought across to the RC45. Honda wanted to produce another no-expenses-spared race machine. Just a short time earlier the extremely complex NR750 had been released for road use. Some of the technology of the NR750 was carried across to the RC45, These included its fuel-injection system, clutch, sprag clutch and even the 16-inch front wheel size.

Some of the RC45's specifications:

- V4 close firing order motor
- Lightweight low friction pistons
- Titanium conrods
- Ceramic and graphite impregnated cylinder liners
- Close ratio gearbox with undercut shift dogs
- Separate air cooled oil heat exchanger
- Many of the engine components were cast from magnesium to save weight
- Cast upper and forged lower triple clamps
- SHOWA front and rear suspension
- 6.00 inch rear rim carrying a 190/50/17 tire

== Differences from the RC30 ==
=== Engine ===
Major development changes were made to the RC45's engine, one of the first differences seen is the bore and stroke, which are much different from the RC30. The RC45 had a reduced stroke compared to the RC30, the RC30 having used a bore and stroke of 70 mm x 48.6 mm, whereas the RC45 was changed to a more over-square stroke ratio of 72 mm bore and 46 mm stroke. This allowed higher maximum engine revolutions than the RC30, whilst maintaining equal piston speed.

Where the RC30 had used roller bearings on the camshafts, the RC45 used more conventional plain bearings. The RC30 had used a piston with one compression ring and oil control ring to reduce friction. This was very effective for racing but resulted in increased oil consumption in the road-going bikes. The RC45 changed to the more conventional two compression ring system, also with an oil control ring. Low-friction piston ring materials and a molybdenum-disulphide coating on smaller piston skirts were used to reduce internal friction.

A significant engine architecture difference between the RC30 and RC45 was the change from centre gear-drive mechanism to crank-camshaft drive, located on the end of the crankshaft. This reduced the number of crankshaft bearings by one, and camshaft bearings by four, with an associated reduction in friction. The RC45 also followed the RC30 in using titanium connecting rods in a revised format, made lighter and stronger, to help cope with the extra RPM the moving parts of a race engine were expected to see.

Honda drastically altered the head castings, tightening the valve angle from the 38degrees of the RC30 to 26degrees in the RC45. By reducing the valve angle, they straightened the port, along with making it higher, thus reducing the turbulence generating ‘short turn’ of the cylinder head. Honda also made the intake ports shorter and utilised intake valves that were 2 mm larger in diameter. The exhaust ports were also modified with a higher port roof, which reduced flow restrictions. The exhaust valves were also larger than the RC30's in diameter

The most notable change of the RC45 when released was the use of Programmed Fuel Injection. Fuel injection had been used on bikes previously but these had either been rather antiquated analog computers or very simple digital units with a minimal number of sensors for input, which resulted in very crude fueling. The RC30 had used 38 mm constant velocity carburettors which, for road use are quite nice, maintaining a high air velocity across a wide rpm range, though were not as well suited for racing. The RC45 did away with carburetors and in their absence a brace of four 46 mm throttles were replaced, Honda now had the throttle area it needed to make big horsepower at high revolutions. The system Honda used on the RC45 was very similar to the system used on the NR750. Contrary to popular belief the RC45's fuel injection is not like a 4-stage carburetor, rather it is a proper fuel only system. Honda kept the ignition system separate. The Honda system obtained information from the following sensors: crankshaft position sensor, camshaft position sensor, air temperature sensor, coolant temperature sensor, manifold absolute pressure sensor, throttle position sensor, barometric sensor and battery voltage. With all of these sensors relaying information to the ECU, Honda could have quite easily incorporated the ignition control unit. The reason that they had not came down to the supplier of parts: they had different manufacturers supplying the ecu and cdi units. Regardless, it allowed the use of very large throttle plates seamlessly over a very wide engine operating range. The engine of the RC45 also used many magnesium castings, as of rather recently, it has become quite common to see fuel injection and magnesium engine parts on motorcycles, though in the early-to-mid 1990s this was expensive and incredibly innovative.

=== Gearbox ===
The gearbox differed little from the RC30's; in fact, it even had the same gear ratios with only the primary and secondary ratios changed. The one-way sprag clutch was also carried over from the RC30 but was of NR750 design. This sprag clutch was a forerunner to today's slipper clutches affording a slight amount of slip on overrun in the attempt to stop the back wheel from locking. The clutch plates were also from the NR750 and were much larger in diameter compared to the ones used in the RC30. The first gear was so tall that the increase in clutch plate diameter improved their longevity. All gears in the RC45's gearbox were undercut to reduce the chance of a gear disengaging.

=== Brakes ===
The front brake rotors of the RC45 were 310 mm in diameter and are actually the same rotors and hats as used on the NR750. A four piston two piece opposed piston caliper was used along with asbestos-free pads. The rear brake used a 220 mm rotor and Nissin two piston sliding caliper also fitted with asbestos-free pads. This caliper was used on many different Hondas including the RC45's little brother, the NC35 RVF400. There is nothing special about the brakes other than they were adequate for the time; many have later installed Brembo brakes or if the budget doesn't stretch that far, the excellent Nissin caliper used on the 954 Fireblade and SP-1 VTR1000 can be bolted straight up with a marked improvement in braking response and feel.

=== Frame ===
The dimensions of the machine were little changed from the RC30: the steering angle was sharpened by 0.5 degree, the wheelbase was increased a few mm, the swing arm was lengthened slightly, and the front height was dropped about 4 mm. The major change was the placement of the motor in the frame. This has over the years sparked many debates, with some saying the motor was too far forward and others saying that the motor was too far back. It appears that Honda set out to build an all out race bike then made a few compromises to make it road usable.
