= Honda RVF400 =

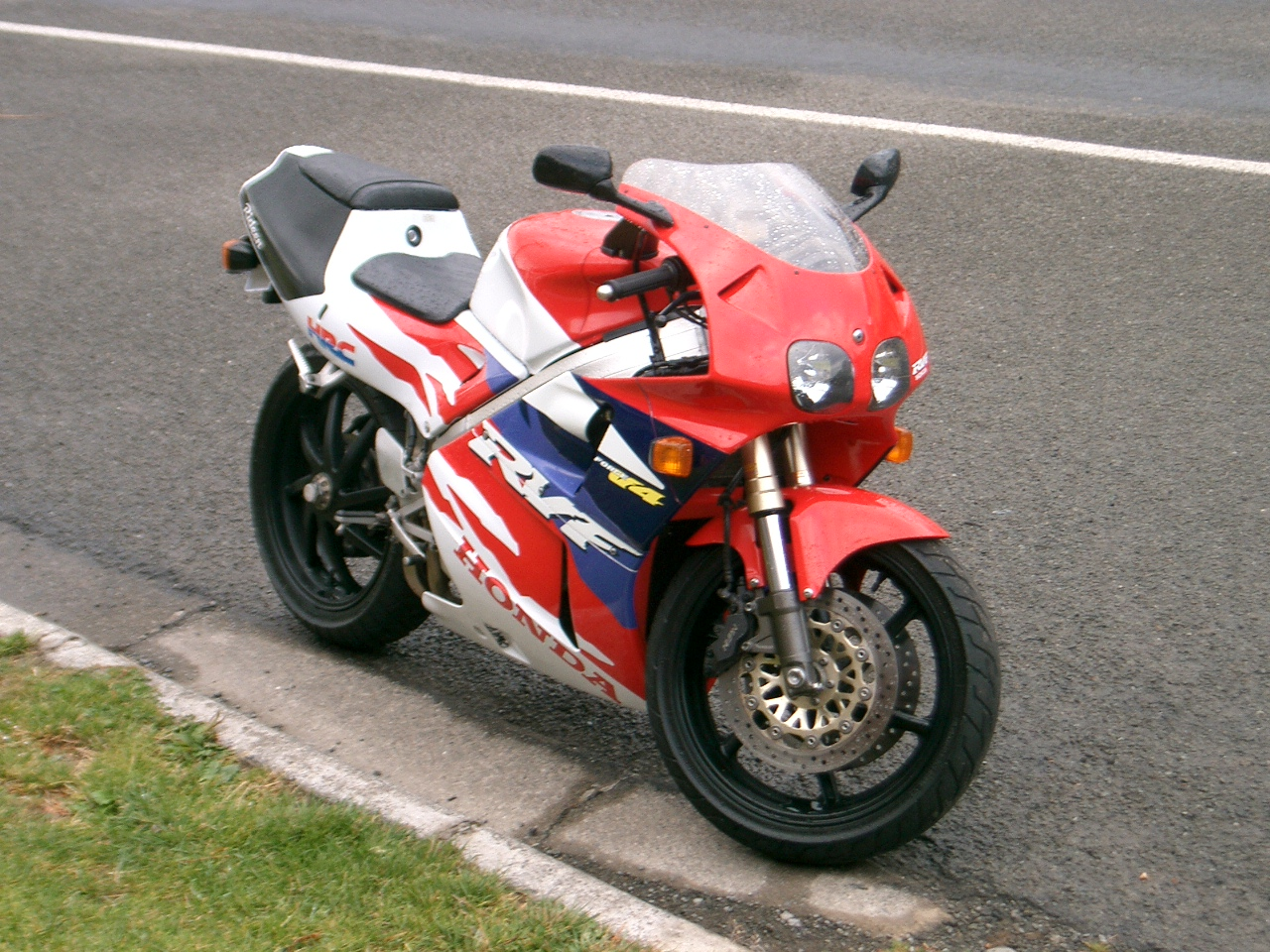
- Manufacturer: Honda
- Production: 1994–1996
- Assembly: Kumamoto, Japan
- Predecessor: Honda VFR400R (NC30)
- Class: Sport bike
- Engine: 399 cc (24.3 cu in), 4-stroke, liquid-cooled, 90°, V4
- Bore / stroke: 55 mm × 42 mm (2.2 in × 1.7 in)
- Compression ratio: 11.3:1
- Power: 59 hp (44 kW) @ 13,000 rpm
- Transmission: Sequential 6-speed constant mesh manual, chain final drive
- Brakes: Front: double disc / Rear: disc
- Dimensions: L: 1,985 mm (78.1 in); W: 685 mm (27.0 in); H: 1,065 mm (41.9 in)
- Weight: 364 lb (165 kg) (dry)
- Related: Honda CBR400; Honda RVF750; Honda VFR400

The Honda RVF400R (NC35) was a sport bike manufactured by Honda from 1994 to 1996. It was powered by a 16-valve double overhead geardriven cam 400 cc 90° V4 four-stroke engine, and was known for its handling capabilities.

Two models were produced, the RVF400RR (1994) and the RVF400RT (1996), although they differed only in their paint schemes. The RVF400RR having Honda colours Sparkling red/Ross white/Atessa blu and the RVF400RT coloured Sparkling red/Ross white/Uranus purple. Most distinguishing is the RVF400RT's "RVF" logo in yellow rather than white.

The RVF (as it was marketed by Honda in Japan) finished production in 1996, though unsold RVFs remained available to purchase from Japanese Honda dealers until 2001. The RVF400R is the smaller sibling of RVF750R (RC45), as the VFR400R (NC30) was to the VFR750R (RC30).

The Honda RVF400R was the successor to the Honda VFR400R NC30, which ceased production in 1993. While at first glance there appear to be mainly styling changes between the VFR400R and the RVF400R, the actual number of changes are vast as the entire bike was redesigned with numerous identical looking components being totally different.

The obvious differences between the VFR400R and the RVF400R are that the front forks are of the upside-down type and the rear wheel uses a 17" tyre (the Honda VFR400R used an 18"), there are two air tubes that feed fresh air to the area just in front of the air box (this is not a ram air system, the airbox is unpressurised) and the headlights have changed from twin round headlights to twin 'fox-eye' lights (this is one feature not mirrored from the RVF750R (RC45) as the RC45 features twin large round headlights).

Unlike the VFR400R the RVF400R was only officially sold new in Japan. The RVF400R has slightly less peak power than the VFR400R (due to Japanese regulations at the time) but has a stronger midrange. There is a Haynes Manual available for the RVF400R.

Like other Hondas with gear-driven camshafts, the RVF's engine makes a loud whine when operating. The exhaust note of the V4 engine is also different from that of a more conventional inline four. The 400 cc VFR and RVF models share a unique exhaust note with their larger siblings—the VFR750R RC30 and the RVF750R RC45—because of their 360° or big-bang firing order.

== VFR400 to RVF400 changes ==
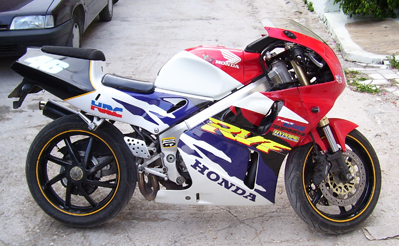
Honda RVF400RT

=== Engine ===
The RVF's carburettors were changed to a semi-flatslide design and smaller diameter venturis (30 mm against the NC30's 32 mm) but claimed to be better flowing. The velocity stacks were also changed to allow a straighter flow into the engine cylinders.

The valve timing was changed with the exhaust valves opening earlier and closing later.

The engine position was changed with large cast sections of the frame now holding the engine lower down (these lower engine mounting points were unused on the VFR).

=== Frame and suspension ===
While the front cartridge forks were changed from RWU to USD forks, they remained the same diameter (41 mm) and make (Showa).

The frame was totally redesigned, with engine mounting and steering geometry changes.

The swingarm, while looking identical at first glance, is narrower (192 mm against 202 mm) and runs on a smaller diameter spindle (17 mm against 22 mm) with the rear hub and brake mounting points changed.

=== Wheels brakes and tyres ===
The rear wheel was changed from 18" to 17".

The front brakes remained as 4 opposed piston calipers but the trailing pistons were increased in diameter from 25.4 mm to 27 mm (the leading pistons remained at 30 mm).

The Honda RC30 had a 'Pro Squat Rear Brake Linkage' that linked the rear caliper to the frame via a linkage through the swingarm, reducing rear wheel hop under braking. The NC30 had the swingarm machined to allow a torque arm shaft and featured the cast boss on the frame but the linkage was not fitted and the caliper was instead held in place with a simple torque reaction arm bolted into the swingarm.

=== Exhaust ===
The exhaust has a number of changes, the main change is that the silencer and collector were separated and the silencer was held to the frame by one mounting point rather than two. The silencer was aluminium and held by three bolts to the collector.

=== Dimensions and weights ===
The dry weight went up from 164 kg to 165 kg, and overall width dropped from 705 mm (27.8 in.) to 685 mm (27.0 in.), overall height changed 1.075 m (42.3in.) to 1.065 m (41.9in.), wheelbase dropped 10 mm from 1.345 m (53.0 in.) to 1.335 m (52.6 in.).

=== Handling ===
The VFR400 is widely acknowledged to be a very good handling motorbike. The RVF400 is more of the same, the main difference being that while the VFR400 likes one line, on the RVF400 it is not a problem to change lines mid corner, helped by the upside down forks.

== Racing ==
The RVF400 NC35 is still being raced in various classes including in the Manx Grand Prix on the IOM.

=== HRC ===
HRC (Honda Racing Corporation) supply a number of parts to adapt the RVF400 for racing

Parts available include:

- A direct air intake airbox (using a scoop in between the radiator and frame, does not use the air tubes).
- Rear ride height adapter (A number of U-shaped plates that fit in between the frame and shock).
- Oil Cooler (a CBR600 oil cooler can be fitted and the water pump drilled to fit the water takeoff)
- Jet kit
- ECU
- F2 Kit Radiators
