= Honda VFR750R =

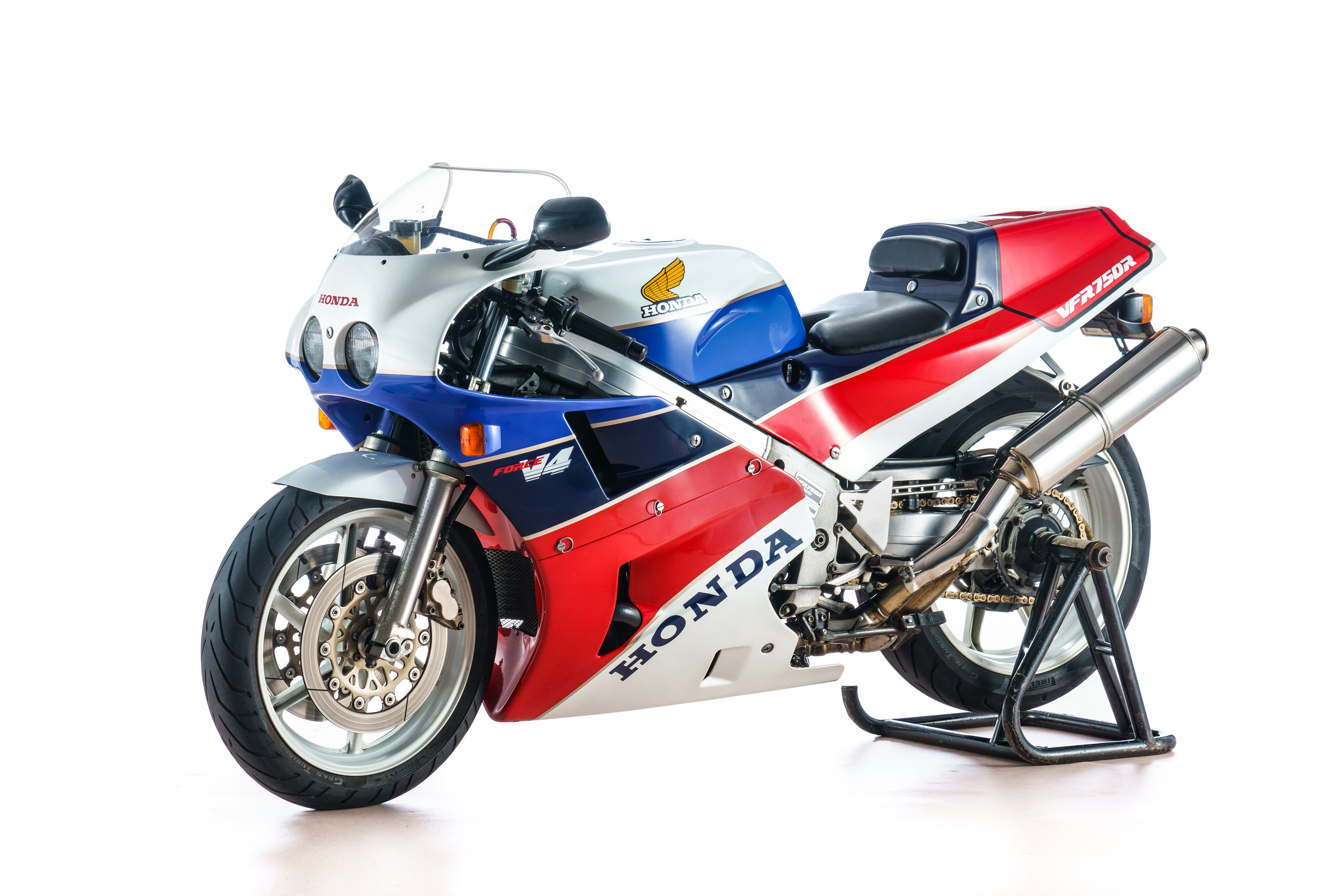
- Manufacturer: Honda
- Also called: Honda RC30
- Production: 1987-1990
- Successor: Honda RVF750
- Class: Sport bike
- Engine: 748.00 cc (45.646 cu in) liquid-cooled 90° V4
- Bore / stroke: 70.0 mm × 48.6 mm (2.76 in × 1.91 in)
- Compression ratio: 11.0:1
- Top speed: 153 mph (246 km/h)
- Power: 75.94 hp (56.63 kW) @ 9,500 rpm (restricted in Japan); 118 hp (88 kW) @ 11,000 rpm (claimed)
- Torque: 7.1 kg⋅m (70 N⋅m; 51 lbf⋅ft) @ 7,000 rpm
- Transmission: 6 speed, chain final drive
- Suspension: Front: telescopic fork Rear: swingarm
- Brakes: Front: dual disc Rear: single disc
- Tires: Front: 120/70-17; Rear: 170/60-18
- Rake, trail: 24 degrees / 91 mm (3.6 in)
- Wheelbase: 1,410 mm (55.5 in)
- Dimensions: L: 2,045 mm (80.5 in); W: 700 mm (28 in); H: 1,100 mm (43 in)
- Weight: 180 kg (400 lb) (dry); 221 kg (488 lb) (wet)
- Fuel capacity: 18 L (4.0 imp gal; 4.8 US gal)
- Related: Honda VFR400

The Honda VFR750R, model code 'RC30', is a fully faired, solo-seat-only racing motorcycle created for homologation purposes for the World Superbike Championship by Honda Racing Corporation (HRC). It was first released to the Japanese market in 1987, released in Europe in 1988 then the United States in 1990. There were only 3,000 made and they sold for US$15,000 (equivalent to $37,000 in 2025) - a very large amount for a production bike at the time.

== Engine ==
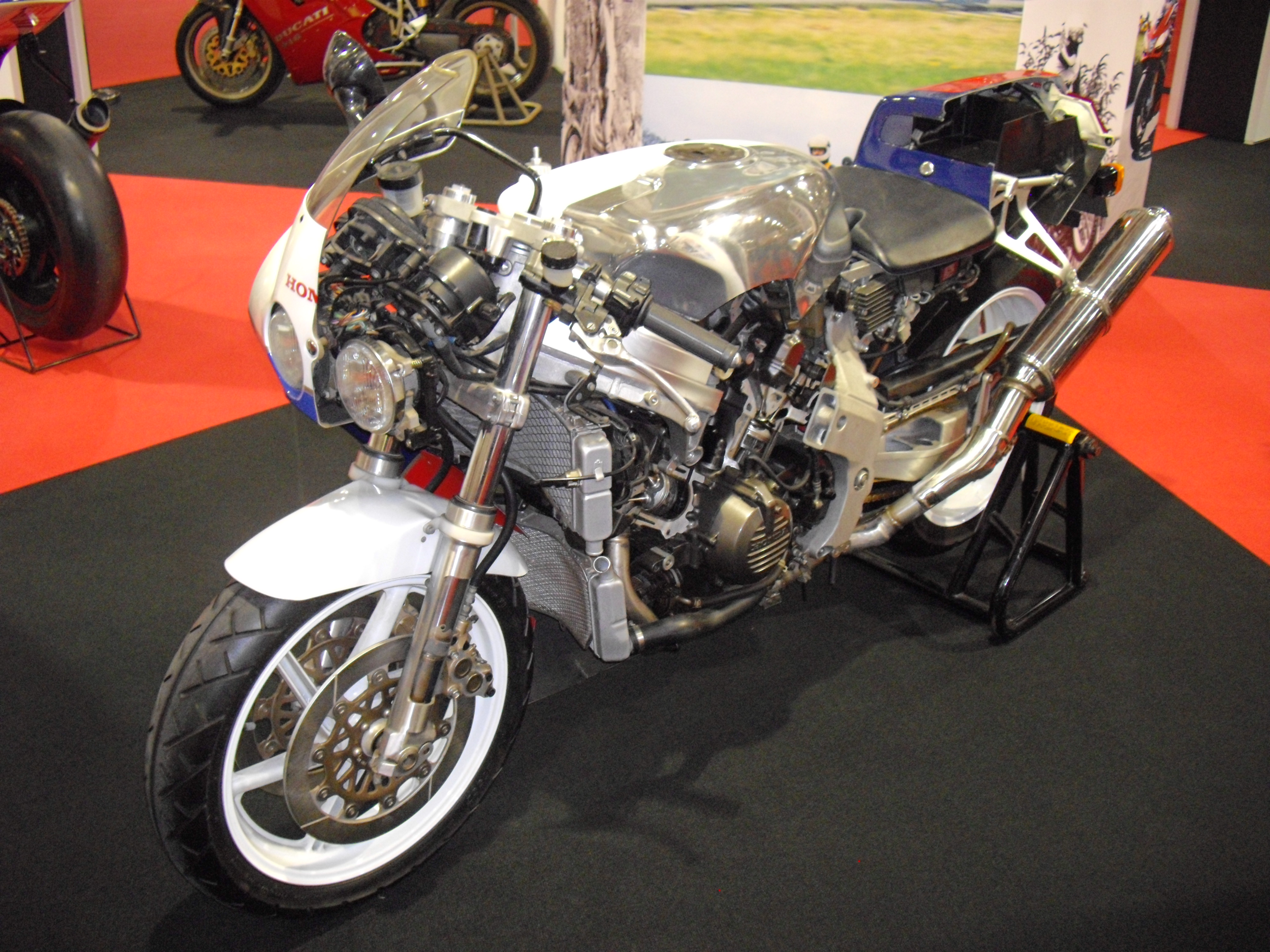
Honda RC30

The 748 cc 16-valve gear driven double overhead camshaft liquid-cooled RC24-derived 90° V4 produced 75.94 hp (56.63 kW) at 9,500 rpm for the restricted Japanese model and 118 hp (88 kW) @ 11,000 rpm elsewhere. It contained race-inspired components. These included such items as titanium connecting rods that reduced reciprocating weight (50 g or 1.8 oz lighter and eight times the cost) and gear driven camshafts. The engine firing configuration was very different from the road-going VFR750F from which it was derived with a 360° 'big bang' crank arrangement instead of the smoother 180°. This feature produced a very broad spread of power and was coupled to the close ratio gearbox which had an extremely high first gear ratio (0 - 82 mph). Slowing down was made easier with a slipper clutch, and impressive braking capability for the era.

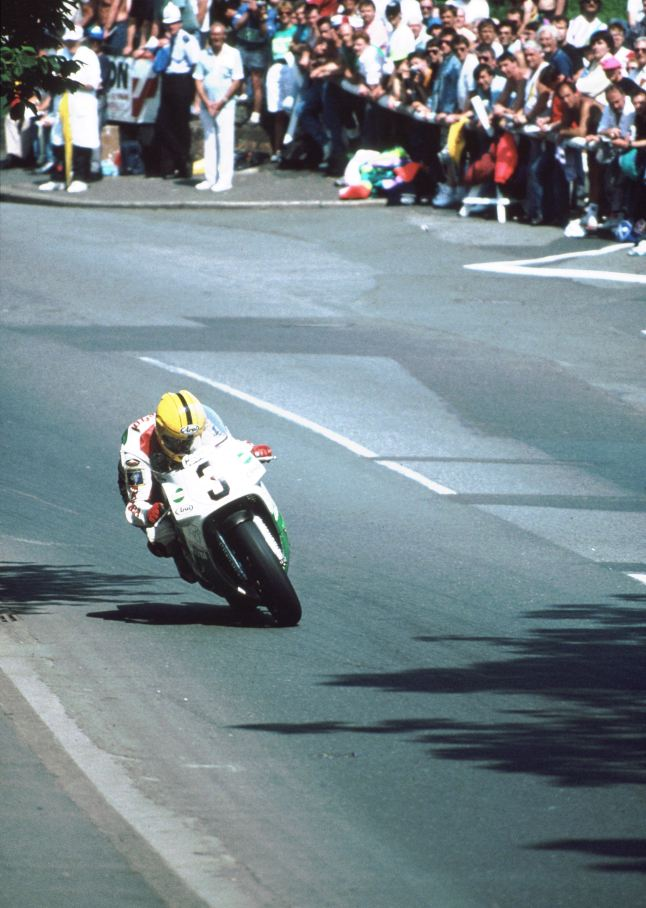
Joey Dunlop coming down Bray Hill, Isle of Man in the 1992 Senior TT race, on his Honda RC30.

While being inspired by the Honda RVF endurance racer (not to be confused with the Honda RVF750 RC45) the VFR750R instead had its engine based on the 1986-7 VFR750F (RC24). The engines are almost identical externally, the only visible differences being in the cylinder heads and the engine side covers. Inside the engine no major parts were identical to the RC24. The clutch, gearbox, crankshaft, oil pump, connecting rods, water pump, pistons, starter clutch, and the entire valvetrain and cylinder heads are specific to the RC30. There were race kits available from HRC Honda.

It redlined at 12,500 rpm (in comparison to the VFR750F which redlines at 11,000 rpm) and had a tested 1/4 mile time of 11.8 seconds.

== Suspension and brakes ==
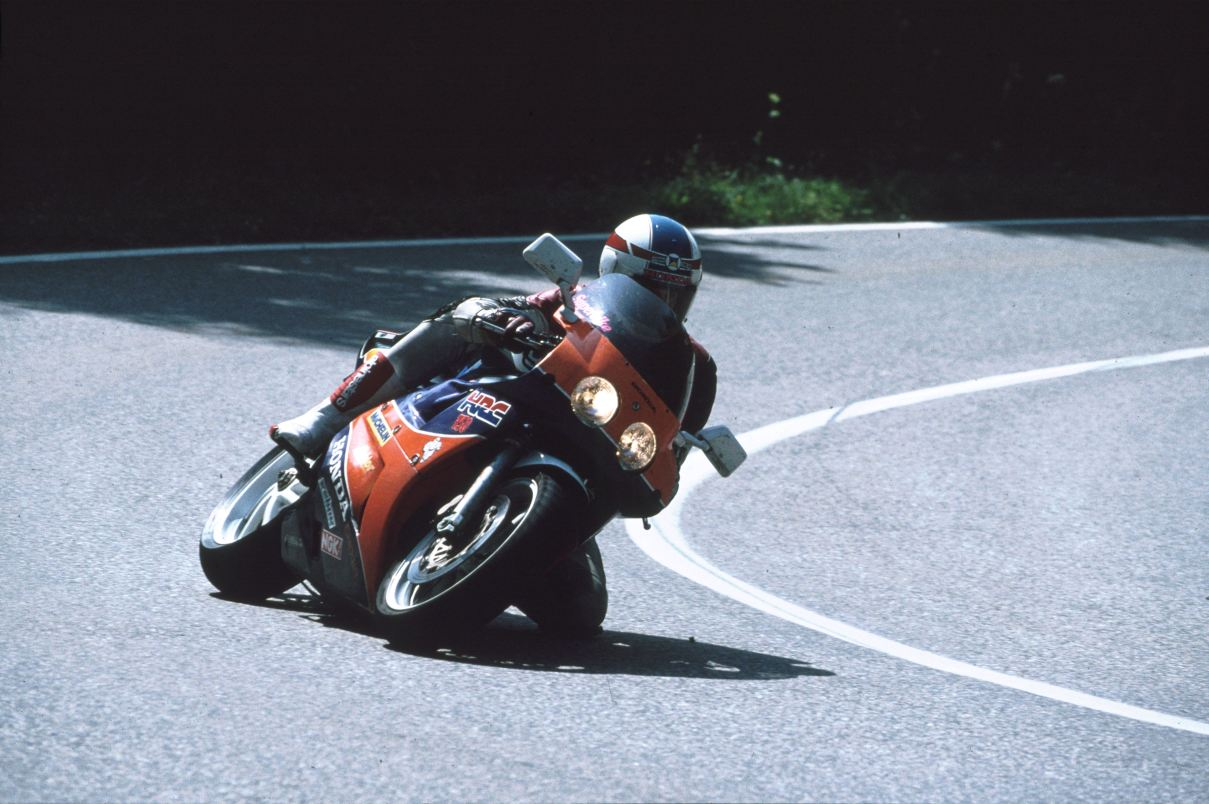
A Honda VFR750R (RC30) racing on the Isle of Man in 1992

The RC30 front suspension was made by Showa and had wheel and brake pads that had quick-release mountings. The rear wheel carried a brake disc to the inside and a chain sprocket to the outside of a single-sided swingarm (originally patented by ELF of France), and attached with a single castellated nut and cotter pin. It was also equipped with fully adjustable Showa suspension which, as it only had a single seat thus focusing suspension performance, gave superior ride and handling characteristics. The engine and low storage position of the fuel in the fuel tank combined to give a low centre of gravity which aided its handling. It also featured a full stainless steel 4-2-1 exhaust system, alloy fuel tank and hand laid fibreglass bodywork.

The bike was fitted with a 'Pro Squat Rear Brake Linkage' that linked the rear caliper to the frame via a rose-jointed linkage through the swingarm (reducing rear wheel hop under braking).

== Motorsport ==
Fred Merkel won the inaugural Superbike World Championship riders and manufacturers titles in 1988, and repeated this feat in 1989.

Robert Dunlop won the 1989 Macau Grand Prix, and Steve Hislop did the same in 1990.

Helmut Dähne set the fastest Nordschleife lap time on a motorcycle (7:49:710) in 1993. He used an RC30 with Metzeler ME Z1 tyres.

== Relatives ==
The VFR400R (NC30) closely resembles the VFR750R (RC30).

The RC30 was superseded some four years after the last one was built by the Honda RVF750 RC45 in 1994.
