= Honda NR =

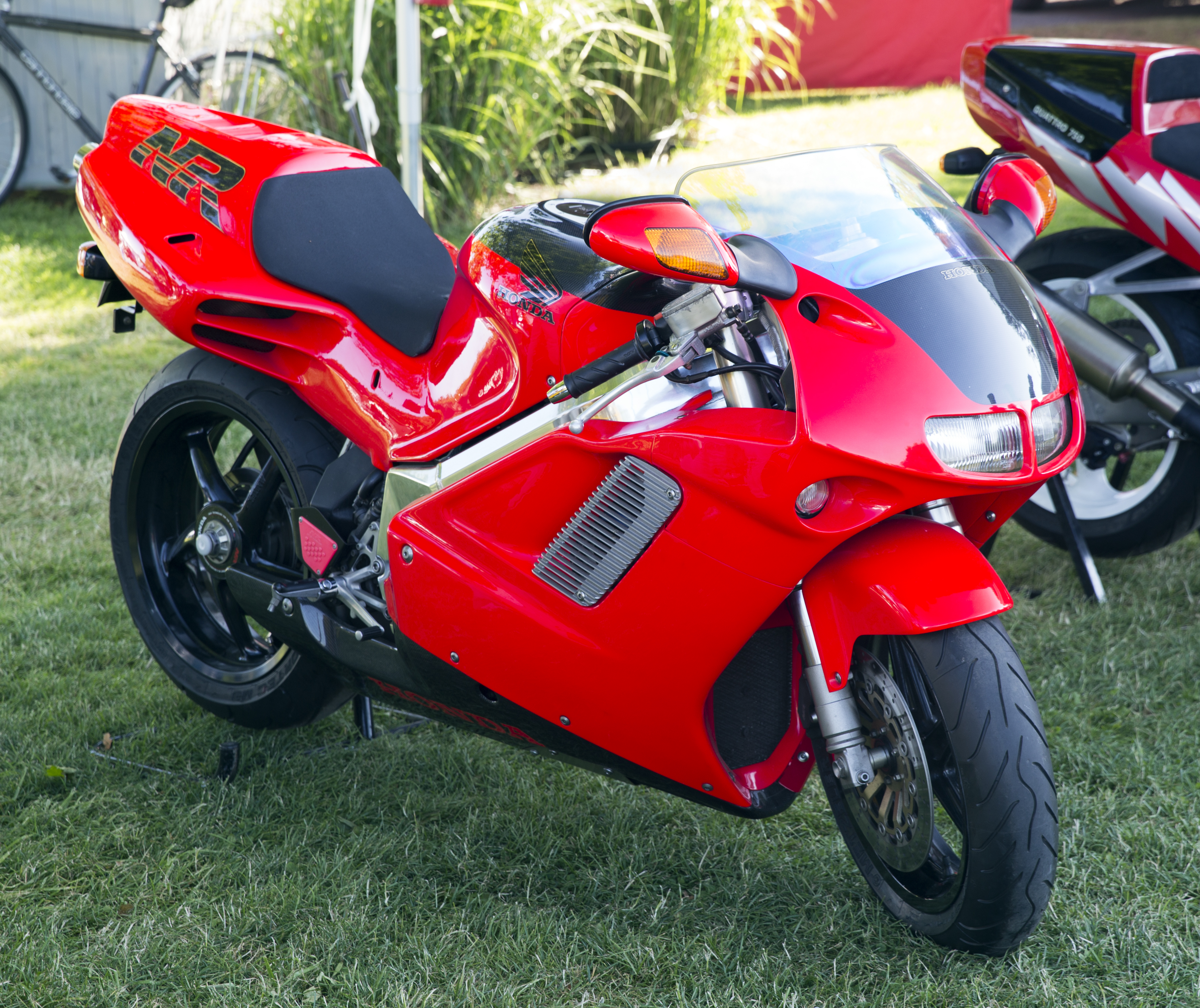
- Manufacturer: Honda
- Engine: 747.7 cc (45.63 cu in) 4-stroke 90° V4 oval-piston, DOHC, 8 Valve per cylinder Individual gear driven cam banks per cylinder.
- Bore / stroke: 101.2 mm / 50.6 mm × 42 mm (4.0 in / 2.0 in × 1.7 in)
- Compression ratio: 11.7:1
- Top speed: 159.8 mph (257.2 km/h)
- Power: 115.8 hp (86.4 kW) @ 14,500 rpm
- Torque: 66 N⋅m (49 lbf⋅ft) @ 11,000 rpm
- Transmission: 6 Speed
- Wheelbase: 1,435 mm (56.5 in)
- Dimensions: L: 2,150 mm (84.6 in); W: 700 mm (27.6 in); H: 1,090 mm (42.9 in)
- Seat height: 785 mm (30.9 in)
- Weight: 223 kg (492 lb) (dry); 244 kg (538 lb) (wet)
- Fuel capacity: 17 L (3.7 imp gal; 4.5 US gal)
- Related: Honda NR500

The Honda NR (New Racing) is a V-four motorcycle series started by Honda in 1979 with the 500cc NR500 Grand Prix racer which used oval pistons. This was followed during the 1980s by a 750cc endurance racer version known as the NR750. The oval piston concept allowed for eight valves per cylinder which generated more power due to the increased air/fuel mixture and throughout compression. In 1992 Honda produced around 300 street versions of a 750 cc model, the NR (often referred to as the NR750), with a 90-degree V angle. Whereas the NR500 had used an oval piston with straight sides, the road going NR750 used an elliptical piston with curved long sides. The bike became the most expensive production bike at the time, selling for $50,000.

== Development ==
The origins of the 'NR' series of motorcycles lie in Honda's return to Grand Prix motorcycle racing in the late 1970s following an absence since their highly successful participation in the 1960s. During the absence of Honda, Grand Prix racing came to be dominated by two-stroke machines that could easily attain a higher specific output than a four-stroke equivalent. Honda had long preferred to concentrate on four-stroke development and therefore decided to produce such a machine to challenge their Japanese rivals.

To achieve this aim Honda could have looked to follow their 1960s practice of increasing the number of cylinders to produce more power. However, Grand Prix rules at the time required a configuration with maximum of four combustion chambers. Honda engineers therefore came up with the highly innovative solution of constructing a 'V8' engine in the form of a four-cylinder. This was achieved by designing an oval piston that allowed a total of 8 valves per cylinder, and connecting two con-rods to each piston. Such a configuration led to almost unprecedented complexity in terms of engine design, with 32 valves and eight con-rods incorporated into the dimensions of a regular four-cylinder motorcycle engine.

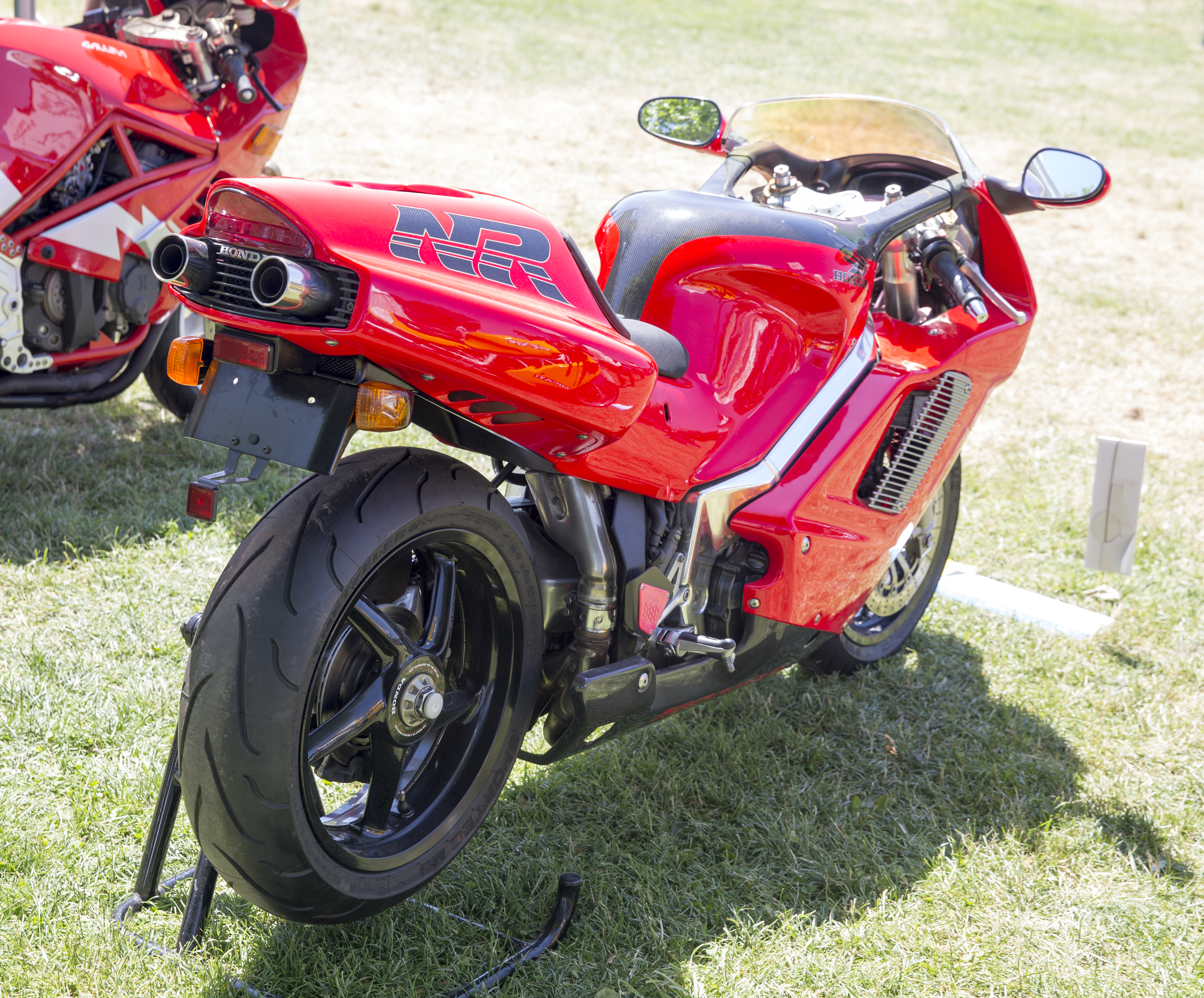
Rear view

Development and testing of the new engine proved fraught with difficulty (prompting some motorcycle journalists of the time to comment that NR meant "Never Ready") but Honda eventually succeeded in meeting the original performance criteria for the engine. The final 500 cc race version was capable of developing approximately 130 bhp at over 20,000 rpm. However, this rarely translated into success on the track for the NR500, and Honda subsequently redirected its Grand Prix campaign in the form of the NS500 two-stroke machine.

In 1983/84, a 250 cc V-twin using a supercharger and the 8-valve oval piston technology was developed but never seen in public.

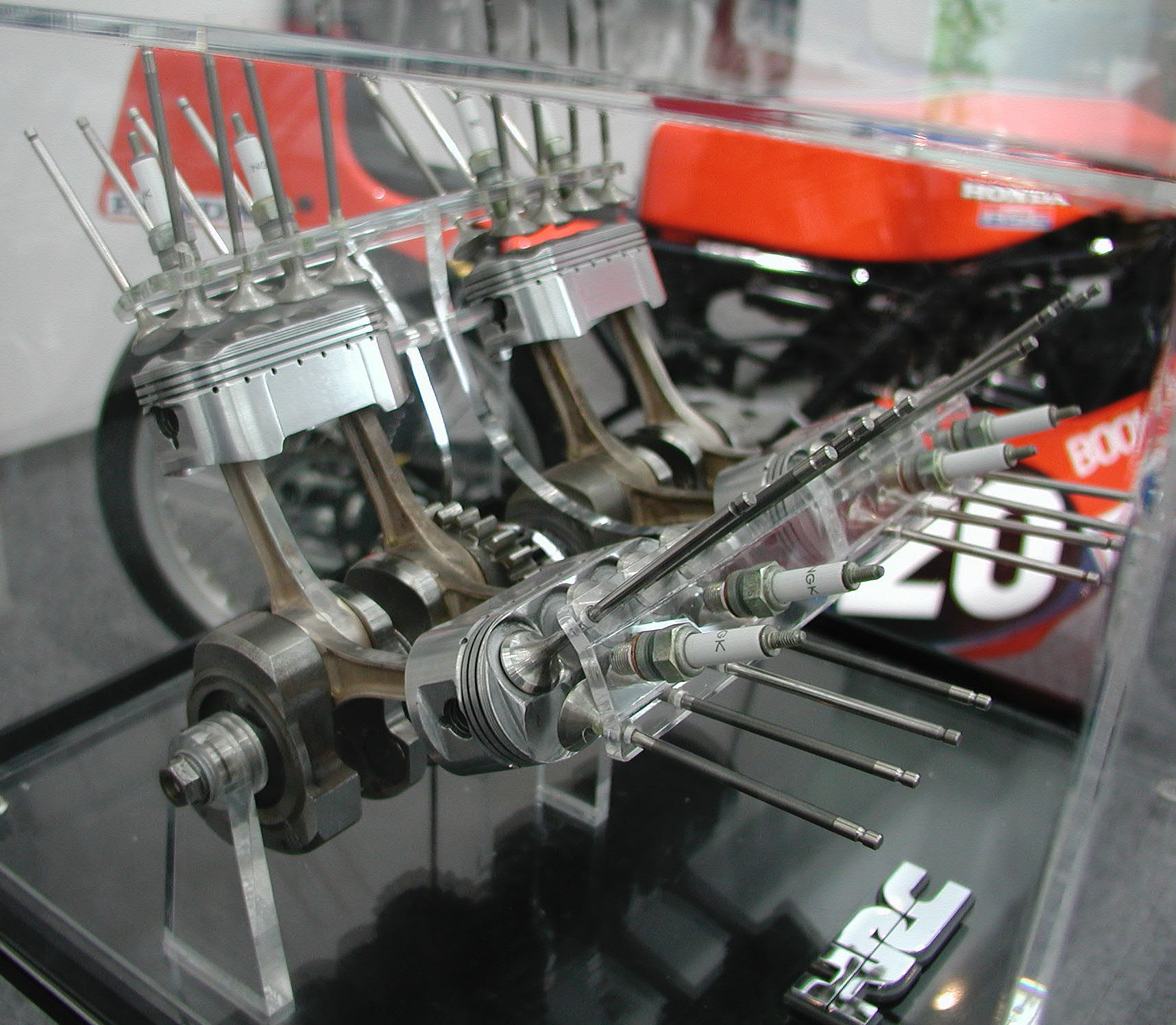
Oval pistons

The oval piston concept continued in the NR750 endurance bike, which made a brief appearance during the 1980s. Finally the technology was transferred to the road, at least on a limited basis, with the bike simply referred to as the Honda NR. This is usually distinguished by using Honda's internal model code of RC40. One of the most expensive road motorcycles yet offered for sale, a limited number of the NR models (300 examples) were sold in 1992 with a 750 cc version of the engine, capable of developing approximately 130 PS (96 kW; 128 bhp) at 14,000 rpm in standard form. The Japanese market motorcycles were restricted by law to 77 PS (57 kW; 76 bhp) at 11,500 rpm. Although a heavy machine by modern standards, it incorporated a range of technologies and design features that have now appeared on more common models. The Ducati 916 copied some design elements from the NR750, such as the single sided swing arm, the undertail exhaust, the "fox eye" headlamps to name a few.

== Concept ==
In 2008 Cologne Motorcycle Show, Honda unveiled a V4 Concept Model to celebrate the company's 60th anniversary.
