= V4 engine =

Piston engine with four cylinders in "V" configuration

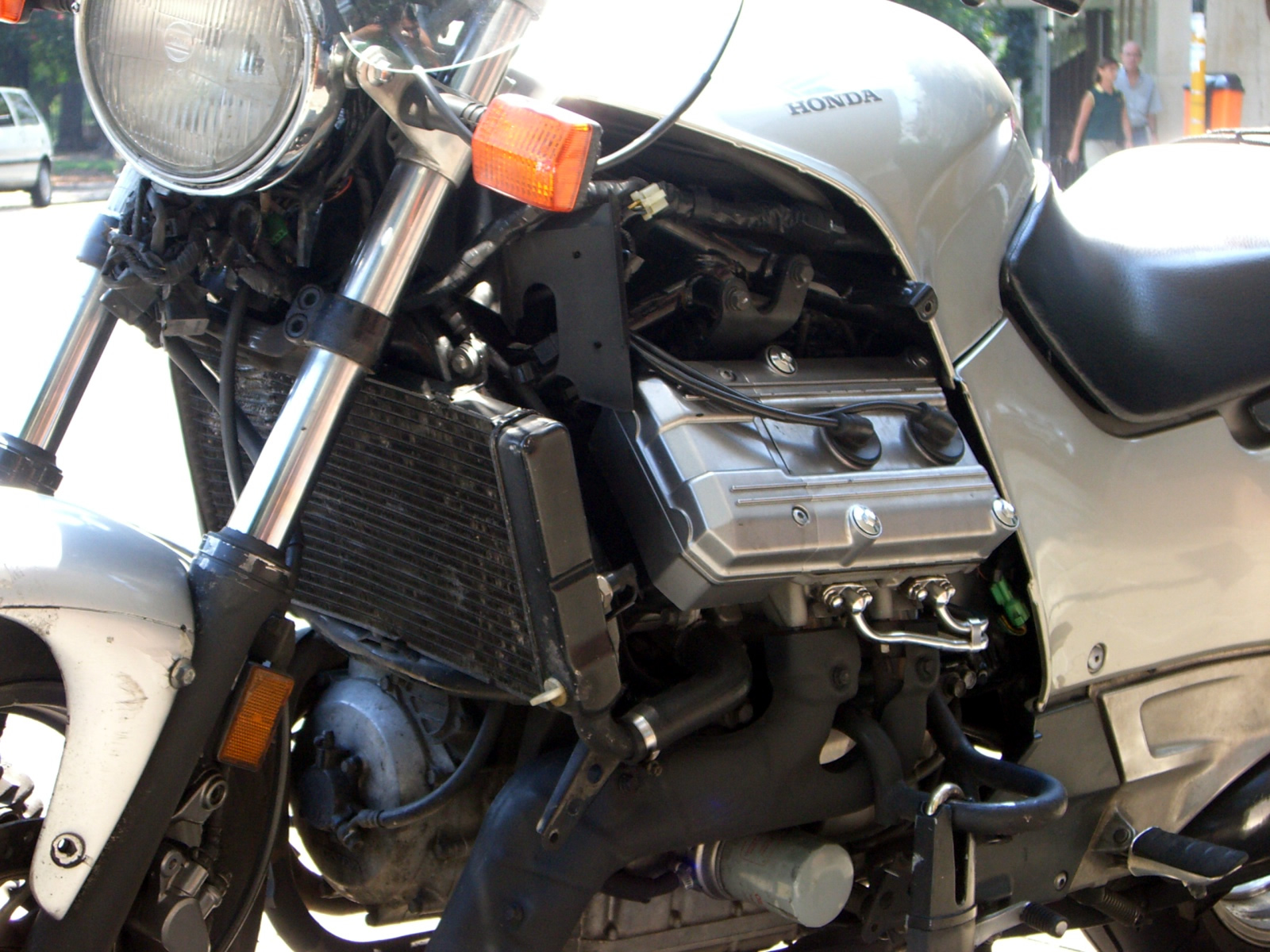
1990-2002 Honda ST1100 longitudinally-mounted V4 engine

A V4 engine is a four-cylinder piston engine where the cylinders share a common crankshaft and are arranged in a V configuration.

The V4 engine is less common compared to straight-four engines. However, V4 engines have been used in automobiles, motorcycles, and other applications.

== Design ==
Some V4 engines have two crankpins that are shared by opposing cylinders. The crankshaft is usually supported by three main bearings in this type of engine. However this arrangement results an uneven firing engine. Split crankpins are preferred for even firing intervals.

Compared to the more common inline-four engine layout, a V4 engine is much shorter. Although different V angles can be used, if the two pistons are at a 90° V-angle with shared crankpins, the engine also achieves a perfect primary balance and offers the additional advantage of better secondary balance that reduces vibration. The shorter crankshaft of the V4 engine is less susceptible to the effects of torsional vibration due to its increased stiffness and also because of fewer supports suffers less friction losses.

Disadvantages of V4 engines include its design being inherently wider compared to inline-4 engines, as well as the requirement of two exhaust manifolds, two-cylinder heads, and two valvetrains (thus needing two sets of camshafts for overhead cam engines) rather than only one cylinder head, one manifold, one valvetrain, and one set of camshafts for an inline-four engine. Having two separate banks of components increases cost and complexity in comparison with inline four engines.

Because V4 engines are wider than inline-four engines, incorporating auxiliary drives, inlet systems, and exhaust systems while maintaining an overall compact size may be more difficult like other V-type engines. In order to reduce width, a narrower V-angle could be utilized, such as 60 degrees. Although a 60° V4 is more compact than a 90° V4 engine, the 60° design does not have perfect primary balance (if the crankpins are not split) and, therefore, often require a balance shaft to reduce vibrations similar to the V6 engines. Additionally, any (four-stroke) V4 engine with shared crankpins will fire unevenly which will result in more vibration and potentially require a heavier flywheel. Using split crankpins in a 60° V4, as used on the Ford Essex V4 engine and Ford Taunus V4 engines, results in an even firing order.

== Automobile use ==
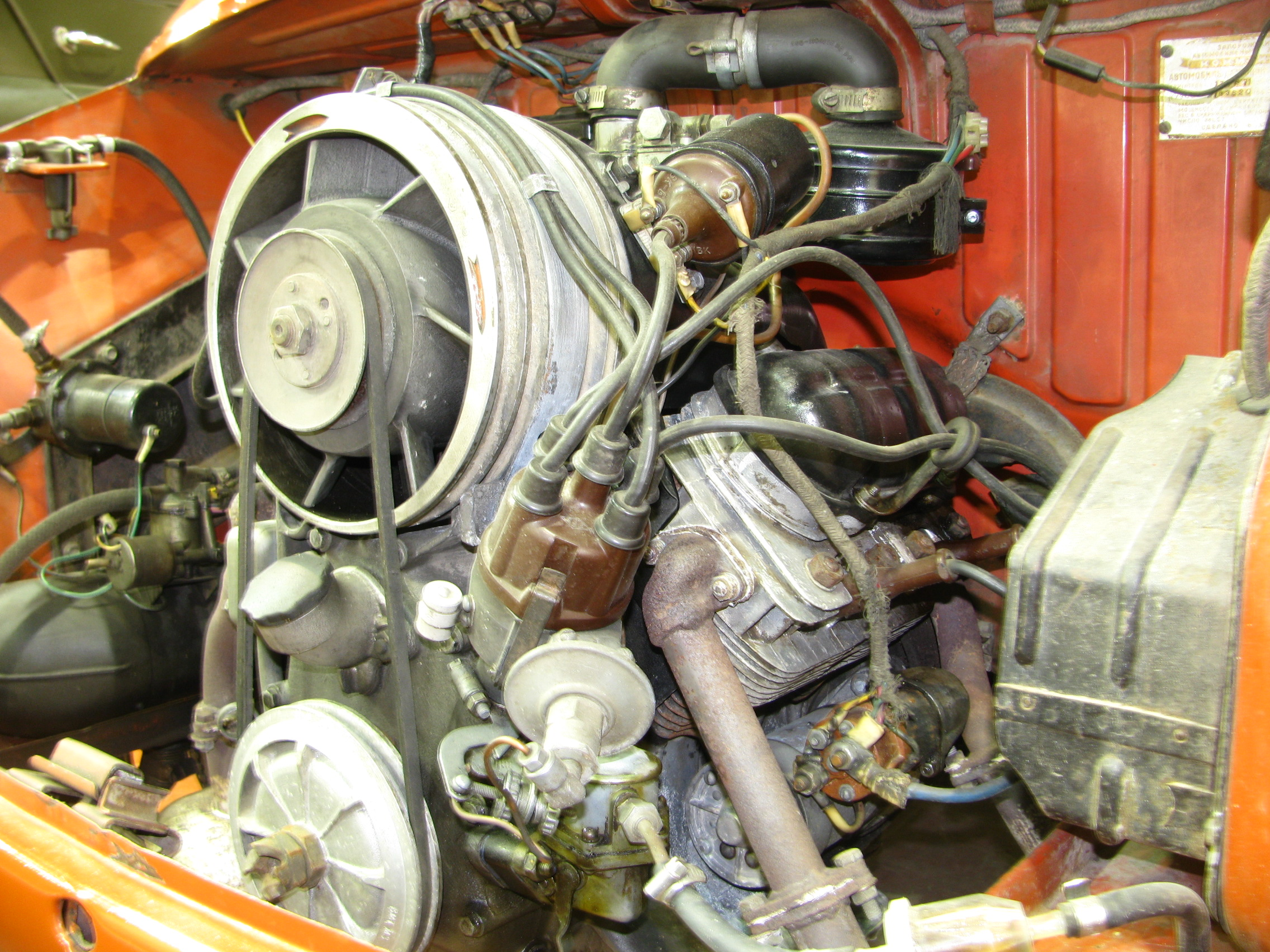
1960–1994 ZAZ Zaporozhets aircooled V4

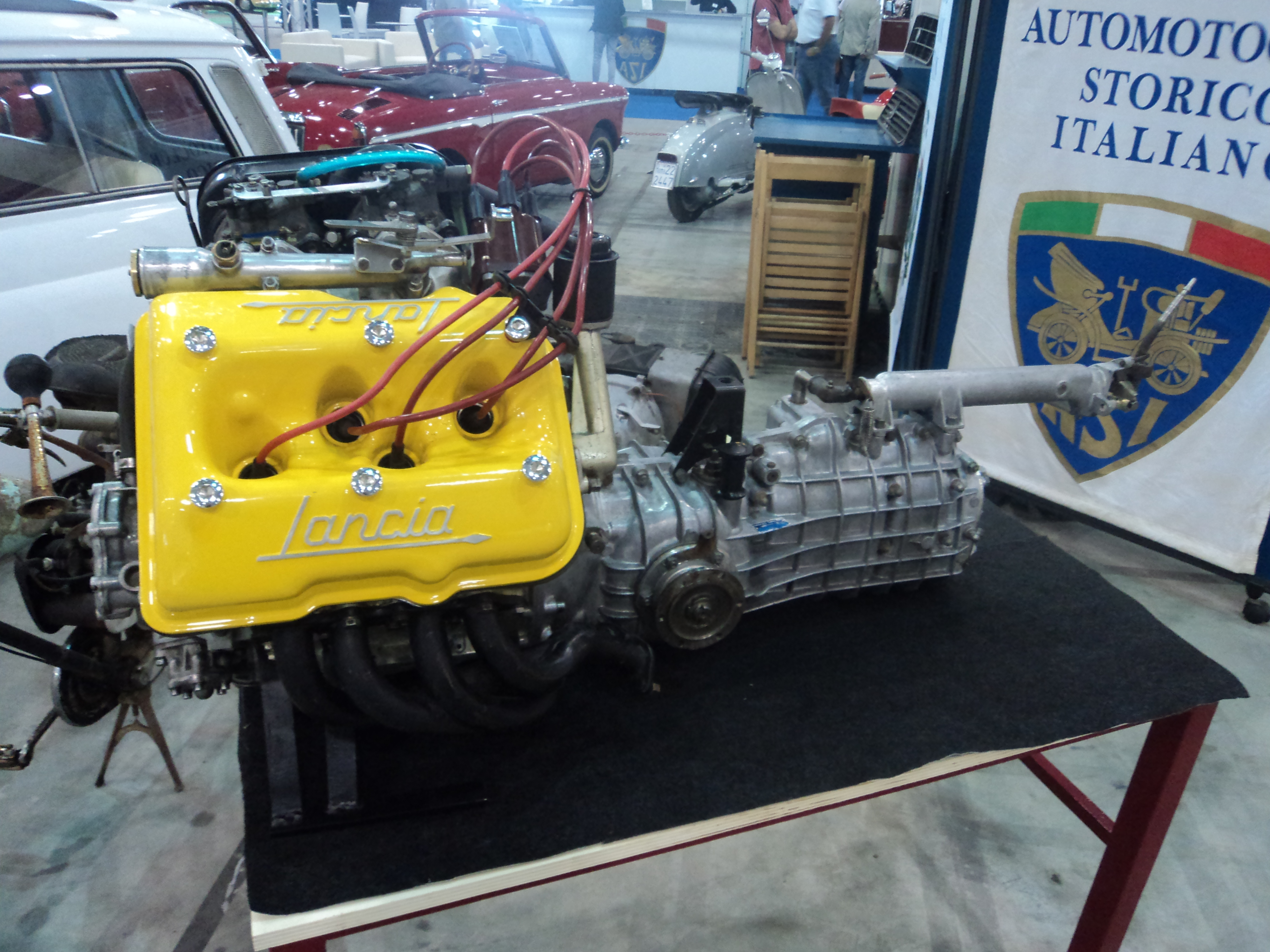
1963–1976 Lancia V4 engine

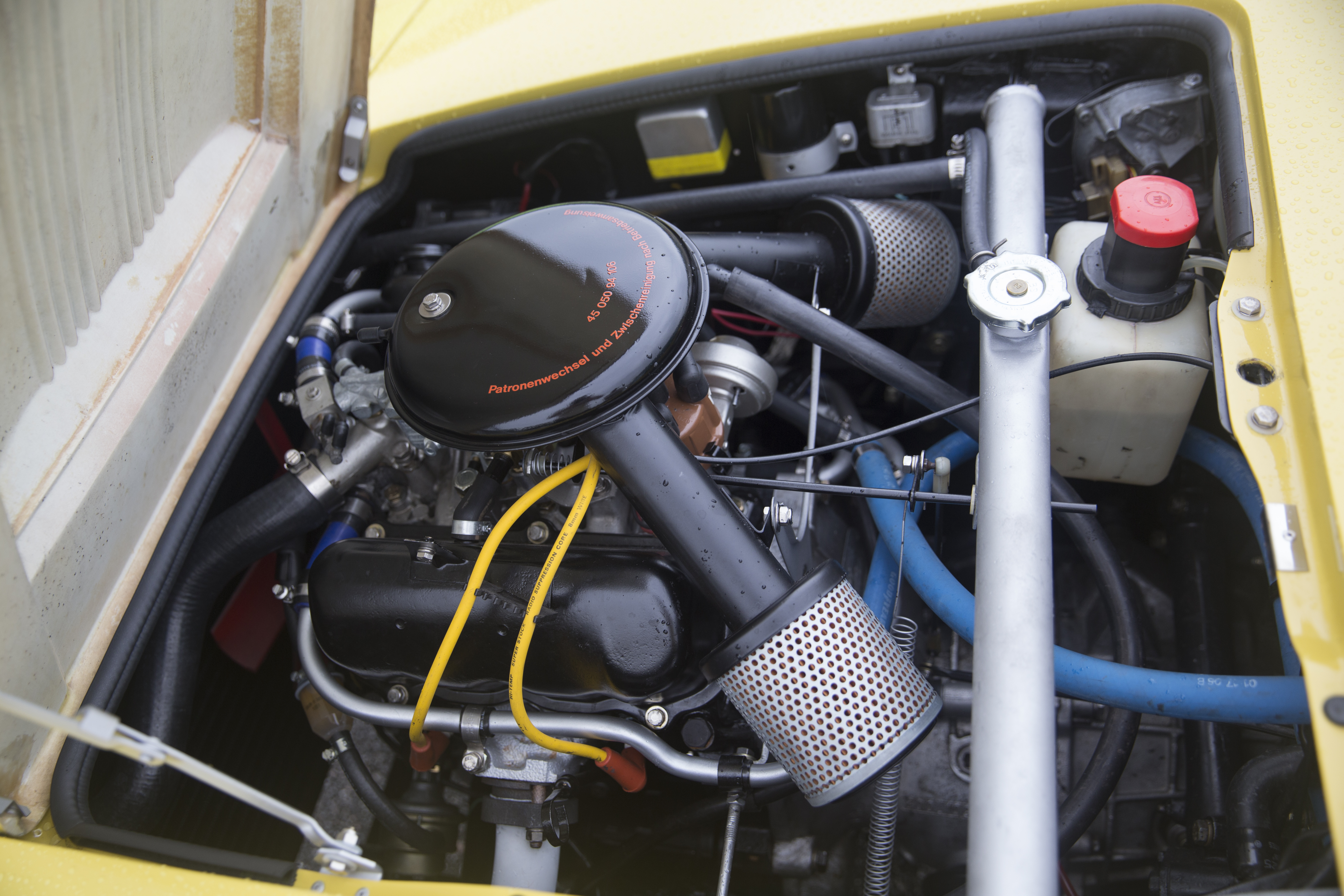
1970–1974 Ford Taunus V4 engine (in a Saab Sonett III)

The earliest automotive use of V4 engines were in Grand Prix racing (later called 'Formula One') cars. One of the pioneering V4 engines was in the 1898 Mors rear-engined car built in France. At the time, the lack of vibration from the V4 engine was a key selling point. However, the car's V4 engine was replaced by a conventional inline-four engine by 1901.

In the 1907 French Grand Prix, the car entered by J. Walter Christie used a 19,891 cc (1,214 cu in) V4 engine, the largest engine ever used in a Grand Prix race. The engine was mounted transversely in the front and the car was front-wheel drive. The car retired from the French Grand Prix after just four laps; however, it later set a speed record of 164 km/h (102 mph).

The first V4 engine used in production cars was the Lancia V4 engine that was first used in the 1922 Lancia Lambda. The Lancia engine was a narrow-angle design with an angle of 20 degrees between the banks and a single cylinder head with one overhead camshaft shared by both banks. It also used aluminium for both the block and head, unusual for the time. Lancia produced V4 engines until 1976, when they were replaced by flat-four engines.

The 1960–1994 ZAZ Zaporozhets is a Soviet city-type car that used a rear-mounted V4 engine. This engine was based on the design used in the LuAZ-967 amphibious military vehicle. It featured air-cooling with a magnesium block and was produced in displacements from 0.7–1.2 L (43–73 cu in).

The AMC Air-cooled 108 was a 108 cu in (1.8 L) engine built from 1960 to 1963 for use in the lightweight M422 Mighty Mite military vehicle. The M422 developed was by American Motors Corporation (AMC) in the United States and specifically designed to be transported by helicopter.

Beginning in the 1960s, Ford's European divisions produced two unrelated V4 engines. The first was the Ford Taunus V4 engine, produced in Germany from 1962 to 1981. The Taunus was a 60-degree V4 engine with water cooling and overhead valves. Initially designed for use in front-engined cars, it was used in various Ford models and also used in the front-wheel-drive Saab 95, Saab 96, and Saab Sonett models. It was also used in the mid-engine Matra 530 sports car. The second Ford V4 engine was the Ford Essex V4 engine, produced in the United Kingdom from 1965 to 1977 and used in several Ford Corsair, Capri, Consul, Zephyr, and Transit models. Although designed separately from the Taunus engine, the Essex also was a 60-degree V4 with water cooling, overhead valves, and designed for use in front-engined cars/vans.

The Porsche 919 Hybrid LMP1 racing car used in the 2014–2017 seasons used a 2.0 L (122 cu in) 90-degree turbocharged V4 engine that was mid-mounted.

== Motorcycle use ==
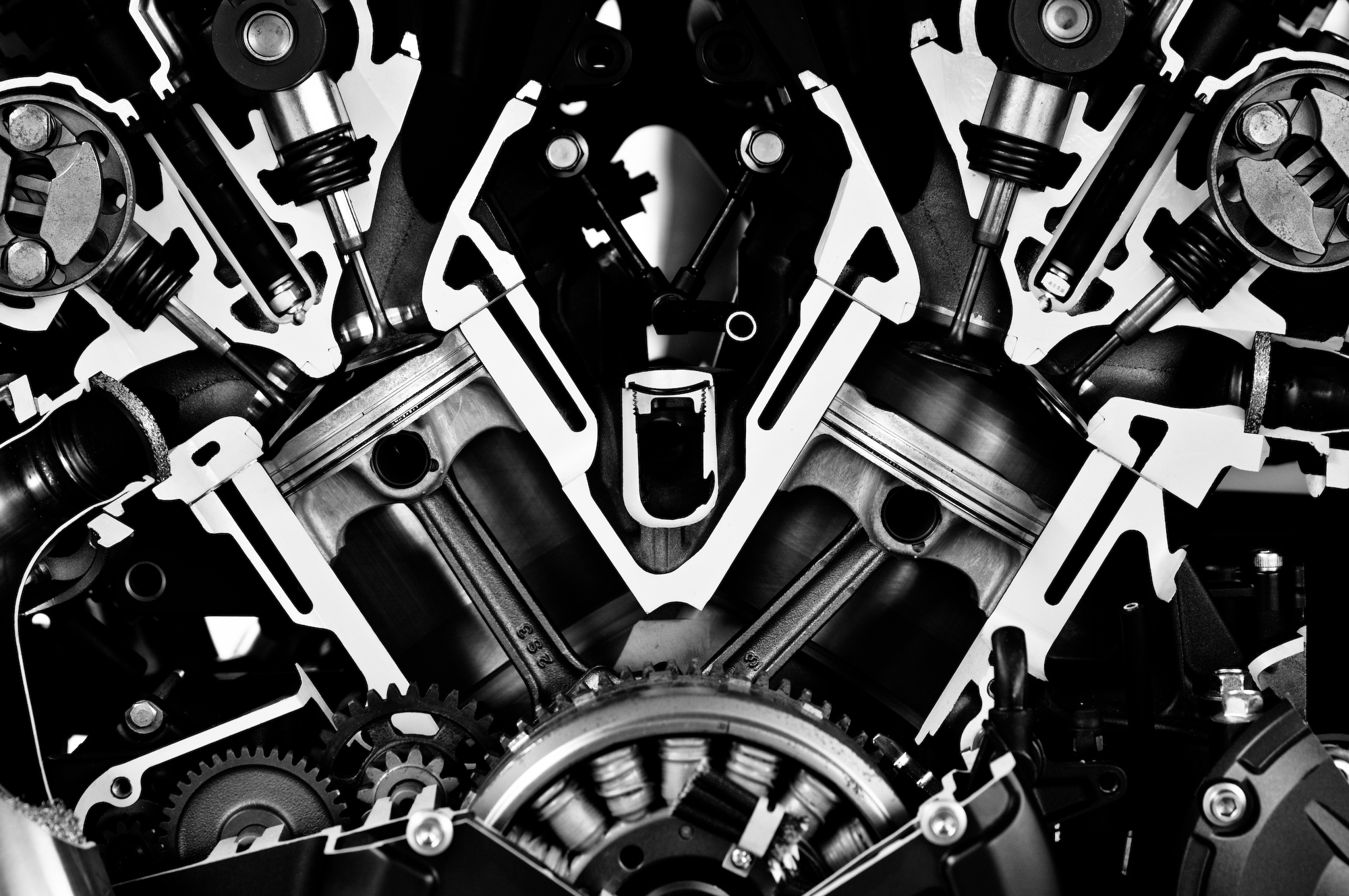
2009 Yamaha V-Max cutaway view

One of the first motorcycles powered by a V4 engine was the 1931–1935 Matchless Silver Hawk built in the United Kingdom. The Silver Hawk used a narrow-angle 16-degree V4 engine with a single cylinder head, pushrod valve actuation, and air cooling.

The 1936–1938 Puch P800 was built in Austria for both civilian and military uses. The P800 used a very wide-angle 170-degree V4 engine (therefore being close in appearance to a flat-four engine) with two cylinder heads and air cooling.

V4 engines were used during the mid-to-late 1980s, especially in transverse-engined Honda motorcycles that had a 90-degree V4 engine with water cooling.

The majority of MotoGP manufacturers have used the V4 configuration since 2020. These include:

- Honda RC213V
- Ducati Desmosedici
- KTM RC16
- Aprilia - 90° V4 for the 2020 season

The reasons for this are that compared to traditional firing order inline four engines, V4 engines

- are narrower, resulting in a narrower and more aerodynamic motorcycle possibly with a lower center of gravity
- offer better rear wheel traction management during acceleration because of uneven firing that gives the rear tire more time to recover during pauses between power strokes
- have better secondary balance which results in better feedback from the engine especially at high RPM
- offer more even spread of torque over the RPM range

== Boat use ==
Another use of the V4 engine is in outboard motors for boats. The V4 configuration is popular for outboard marine applications due to its short engine length.

In 1958, both Johnson and Evinrude introduced 70.7 cu in (1,159 cc) V4 outboards rated at 50 hp (37 kW) and weighing 200 lb (91 kg). By 1972, the same basic V4 block was producing more than double the horsepower in stock form because of the experience manufacturers gained from racing. In 1988, Yamaha introduced a 130 hp (97 kW) two-stroke V4 to the US market with what was called "precision blend" oil injection. Most of the outboard motors are usually two-stroke engines with a carburetor.

== Other uses ==
In 1935, the Wisconsin Motor Manufacturing Company began producing petrol (gasoline) V4 engines for industrial, agricultural, and stationary applications, with several farm equipment manufacturers using the Wisconsin V4 engines. In 1950, the largest Wisconsin V4 engine was the VR4D with a displacement of 255 cu in (4.2 L) and a power output of 56.5 hp (42 kW) at 3000 rpm and a peak torque of 162 lb⋅ft (220 N⋅m) at 1250 rpm. The company produced V4 engines until 2019.

In the mid-1940s, Turner Manufacturing in the United Kingdom produced a diesel water-cooled V4 engine for industrial and marine uses. This engine was used in the 1949–1957 Turner Yeoman of England tractor.

Mitsubishi Heavy Industries built the 4ZF, an air-cooled diesel-powered V4 engine used in the Type 73 armored personnel carrier and related Japanese military vehicles since 1973.

== See also ==
- Flat-four engine
- Straight-four engine
