= Honda VF and VFR =

Range of motorcycles

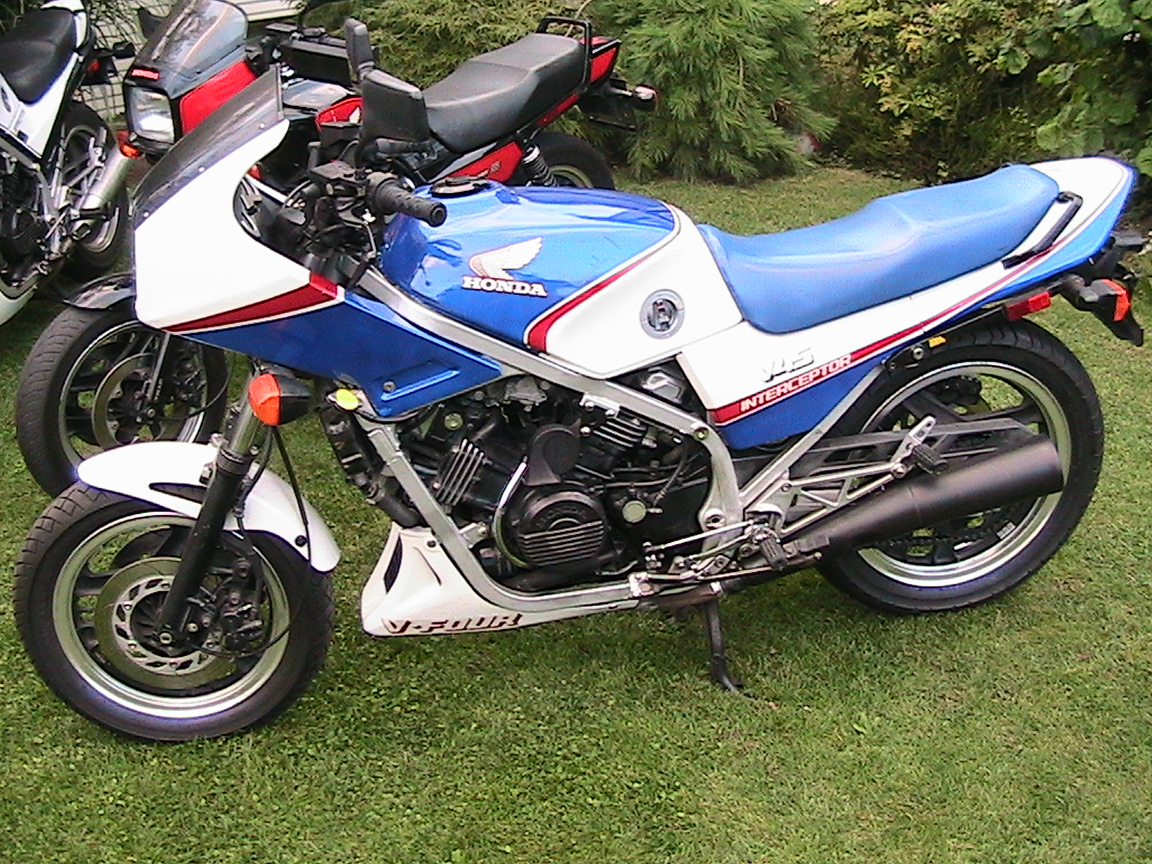
1983 VF750F

The Honda VF and VFR series is a range of motorcycles first introduced in 1982 by Honda featuring V4 engines (hence the "VF" prefix).

== History ==
In 1969 Honda revealed the CB750 superbike, establishing the template for the Universal Japanese Motorcycle with a range of transverse inline-fours. Relishing technological innovation, Honda unexpectedly moved on to adopt the V4 ("VF") configuration. However, some of the early VF models suffered mechanical problems, mainly as a result of poor quality camshafts (the "chocolate cams"). Honda, alarmed that they were losing their hard-won reputation for reliability, moved to introduce the VFR750 motorcycles featuring gear-driven over head cams and a very high build quality. The first three or four iterations of VFR motorcycles re-established Honda's reputation for quality, and the motorcycles received almost universal praise from journalists and riders alike.

The VFR was originally a 750 cc, but became an 800 cc in due course. New models featured technological innovation, such as a single-sided swingarm, linked braking, ABS, and VTEC. The VFR1200 became the first motorcycle to feature a dual-clutch transmission. Not all of these innovations proved popular with riders, who often preferred the simple robustness of the earlier models.

Honda also developed a limited edition VFR, the Honda RC30, as a homologation racing platform. This motorcycle achieved some racing success, but the introduction of very light inline-four motorcycles by competing firms led Honda to downgrade its racing plans.

Honda's VF model lineup had engine capacities ranging from 400 cc to 1,000 cc. Another Honda, the shaft-driven ST1100 also featured a V4 engine, but this touring motorcycle does not form part of the VF series.

== V4 engine ==
Prior to its adoption by Honda, the V4 design had been used only rarely for motorcycles, most notably by Matchless. In modern times, the V4 configuration has been embraced by Aprilia, Ducati, Suzuki, Yamaha & Norton.

Compared to an in-line four, the advantages of a 90° V4 engine include compactness, narrow width, and perfect primary balance giving a smooth and nearly vibration-free operation. A disadvantage is that it is more expensive to manufacture, and, just like a V-twin, more difficult to locate ancillaries and inlet & exhaust systems.

== VF Models ==
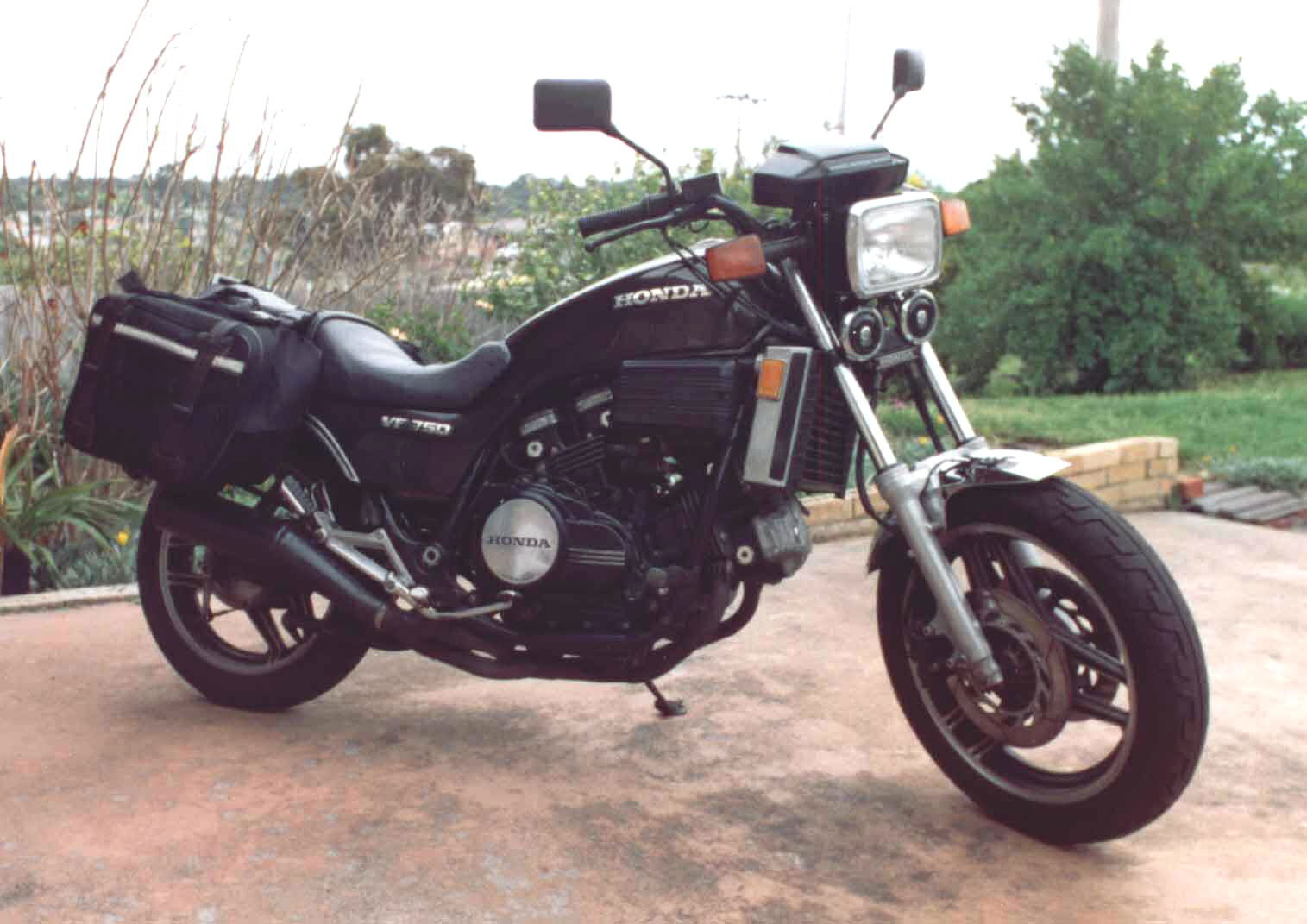
Honda VF750S

In 1982 VF models were introduced to the public at the Cologne Motorcycle Show with a V4 engine mounted in a square-tube steel frame. That very year, reliability and quality control problems arose, possibly due to new automated production equipment at Honda's plant in Hamamatsu, Japan. Regardless, Honda sold out its first year's inventory of Sabres and the Magnas were not far behind. 1983 saw the engine revised to correct the problems from the previous production year and the introduction of the V65 and the Interceptor. Cam-wear problems surfaced during 1984 in the larger displacement bikes, which, by the time it was corrected, led to eight factory cam revisions over the course of just one year.

== VFR750F & VFR800F ==
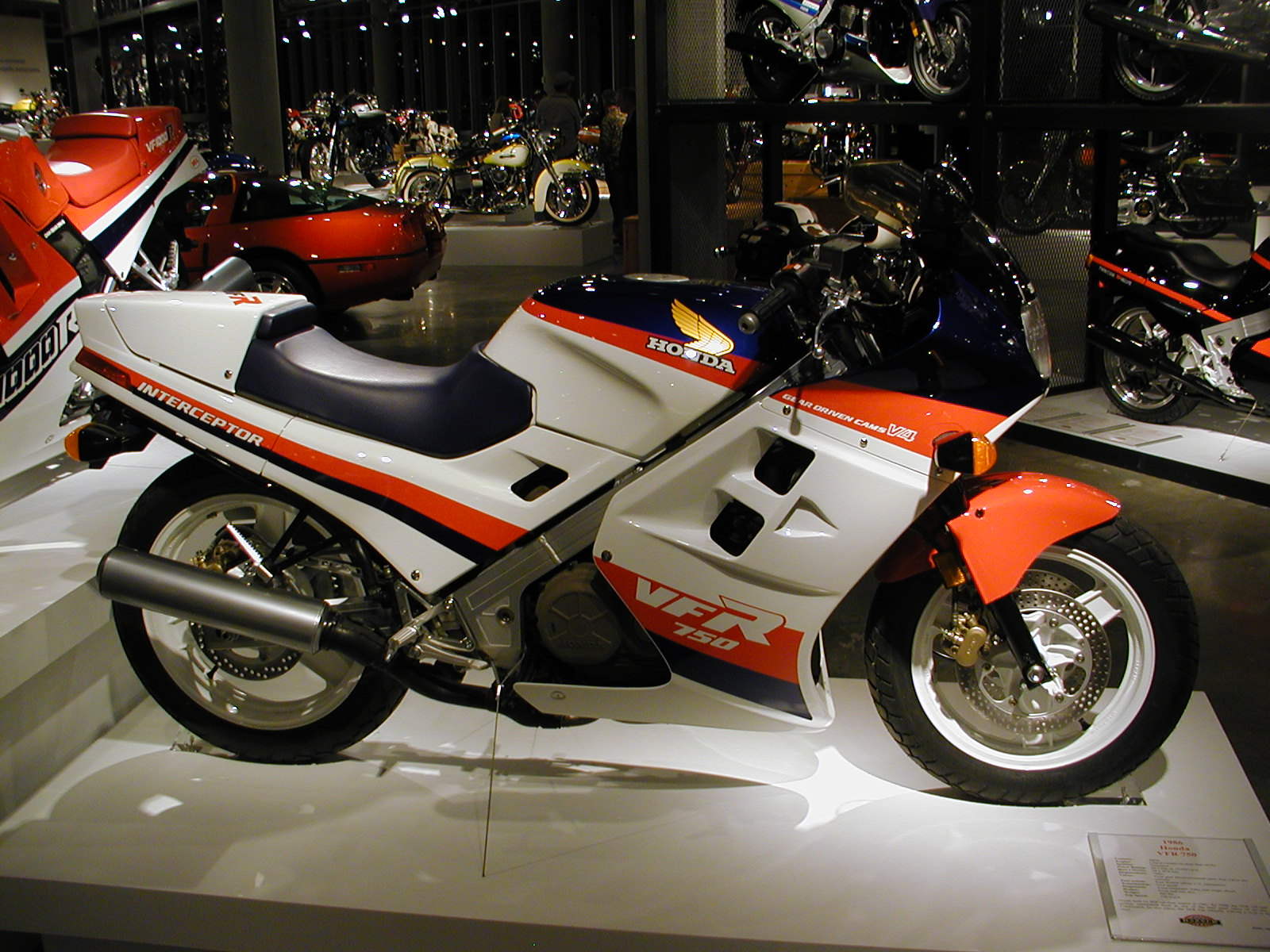
1986 VFR750F

The 748 cc VFR750F (RC24) was introduced in 1986, and was over-engineered in a bid to re-establish a reputation for reliability. It had an alloy beam frame, gear driven cams. This version underwent constant revision of the non-US models with later revisions including changing wheel sizes from 16" front & 18" rear to 17" front and rear, larger diameter forks and the fairing was slightly modified. After this was a series of VFR models which featured various innovations, including a single-sided swingarm, linked braking, ABS, and VTEC. In due course the geared cam drive was dropped in favour of cheaper chain-drive.

A total redesign of the engine to a new one based on the RVF750R (RC45) and a slight capacity increase led to later models being designated the "VFR800F".

== VFR1200F ==
A much larger capacity VFR model, the VFR1200F, was revealed at the Tokyo Motor Show in October 2009. The new 1,200 cc (73 cu in) narrow-angle SOHC V4 engine does not use the V-Tec design of the smaller VFRs. It has an optional six-speed push-button operated dual clutch transmission with three modes: automatic, sport and manual. The modes are similar to those on the Honda DN-01 but with a conventional gearbox shifted automatically, similar to a "Tiptronic" system, and without a hand-operated clutch rather than a hydrostatic drive.

To date, the VFR1200 has not sold particularly well, as buyers have tended to favour the smaller VFR800F (RC79).

Honda have permitted the Ariel Motor Company, British makers of the Ariel Atom sports car, to use the VFR1200's V4 engine in a new motorcycle, the Ariel Ace.

== Race Models ==
Honda developed the RC30 as a homologation racing version which was used from 1988 to 1993. It was the first large capacity motorcycle to use a single-sided swingarm.. The RC30 was succeeded in 1994 by the RC45.

== List of models ==
=== VF ===
- Magna
- Sabre V4
- VF400F (NC13)
- VF500F 'Interceptor'
- VF700F 'Interceptor'
- VF750F 'Interceptor'
- VF1000 'Interceptor'

=== VFR ===
- VFR400 (NC21/NC24/NC30)
- VFR700F2
- VFR750F RC24
- VFR750F RC36
- VFR750R (RC30)
- VFR800 'Interceptor' (RC46)
- VFR1200F

=== RVF ===
- RVF400R (NC35)
- RVF750R (RC45)

=== Derative models ===
- VFR800X Crossrunner
- VFR1200X Crosstourer

== Notes ==
- Downes, Andy (14 September 2009), Honda reveal more engine details of VFR1200, Motorcycle News
- Frank, Aaron (September 2009), "2010 Honda VFR1200 – Auto-Interceptor; Honda confirms its 2010 VFR will feature an automatic transmission", Motorcyclist
- Porter, Marc (24 June 2009), "UK Exclusive: New Honda V4 spied in action", Motorcycle News
- Westlake, John (8 September 2009), Honda confirms dual clutch on new VFR1200, Motorcycle News
