= Honda VFR1200F =

VFR1200F
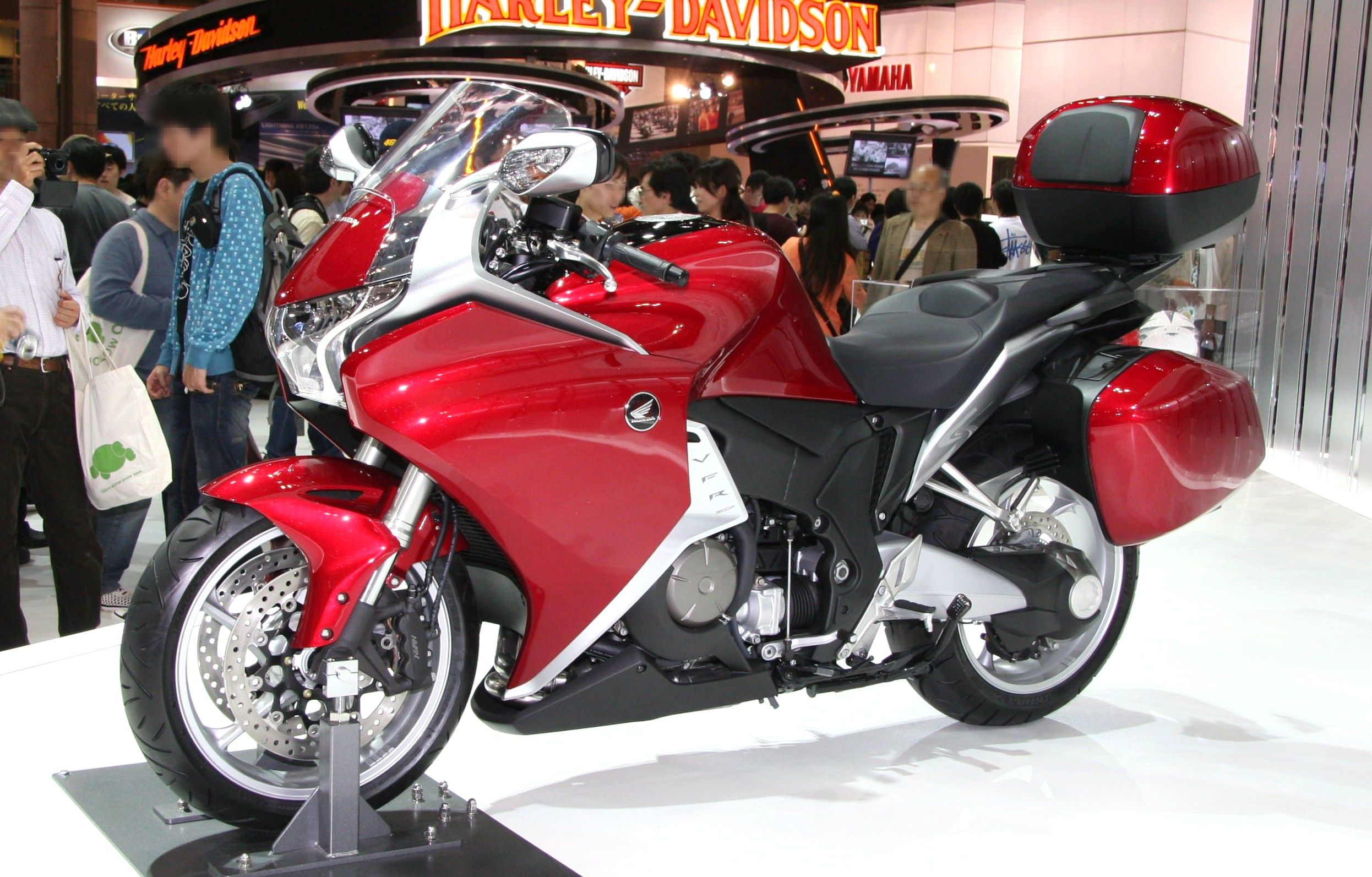
- Manufacturer: Honda
- Production: 2009–2017
- Predecessor: VFR800, Super Blackbird
- Successor: Honda NT1100
- Class: Sport touring
- Engine: 1,237 cc (75.5 cu in), UNICAM, 76° V4; Throttle by wire
- Bore / stroke: 81 mm × 60 mm (3.2 in × 2.4 in)
- Compression ratio: 12.0:1
- Top speed: 175 mph (282 km/h) (Engine restricted)
- Power: 127 kW (170 hp) @ 10,000 rpm 173 hp (129 kW) (148.94hp|rear wheel)
- Torque: 129 N⋅m (95 lb⋅ft) @ 8,750 rpm 84.68 lb⋅ft (114.81 N⋅m) (rear wheel) 90% of the torque available at 4,000 rpm
- Transmission: 6-speed constant-mesh manual or optional dual-clutch automatic gearbox, shaft drive
- Suspension: Front: 43 mm telescopic fork, preload and rebound adjustable Rear: Pro-link with rebound and remote preload adjust, single-sided swingarm
- Brakes: Front: 320 mm dual disc, 6-piston, Combined ABS; Rear: 276 mm single disc, 2-piston, C-ABS
- Tires: Front: 120/70 ZR17; Rear: 190/55 ZR17
- Rake, trail: 25.5°, 101 mm (4.0 in)
- Wheelbase: 1,545 mm (60.8 in)
- Dimensions: L: 2,250 mm (89 in); W: 755 mm (29.7 in); H: 1,220 mm (48 in)
- Seat height: 815 mm (32.1 in)
- Weight: 267 kg (589 lb) (wet)
- Fuel capacity: 18.5 L (4.1 imp gal; 4.9 US gal)
- Oil capacity: 4 L (4.2 US qt)
- Fuel consumption: 15.5 km/L (6.5 L/100 km; 44 mpg_{‑imp}; 36 mpg_{‑US})
- Turning radius: 3.5 m (11 ft)
- Related: Honda Crosstourer; Honda VFR800

The VFR1200F is the 7th generation Honda sport touring motorcycles from the VF and VFR line motorcycles powered by a transverse mounted V4 engine. The VFR1200F has several new technologies including the first dual clutch transmission offered on a motorcycle.

When the sixth generation VFR800 was discontinued, it was followed by both the 2014 VFR800F (RC79) and the larger VFR1200.

The VFR1200F was discontinued in 2017, as it no longer complied with new emission standards and noise regulations.

== Development ==
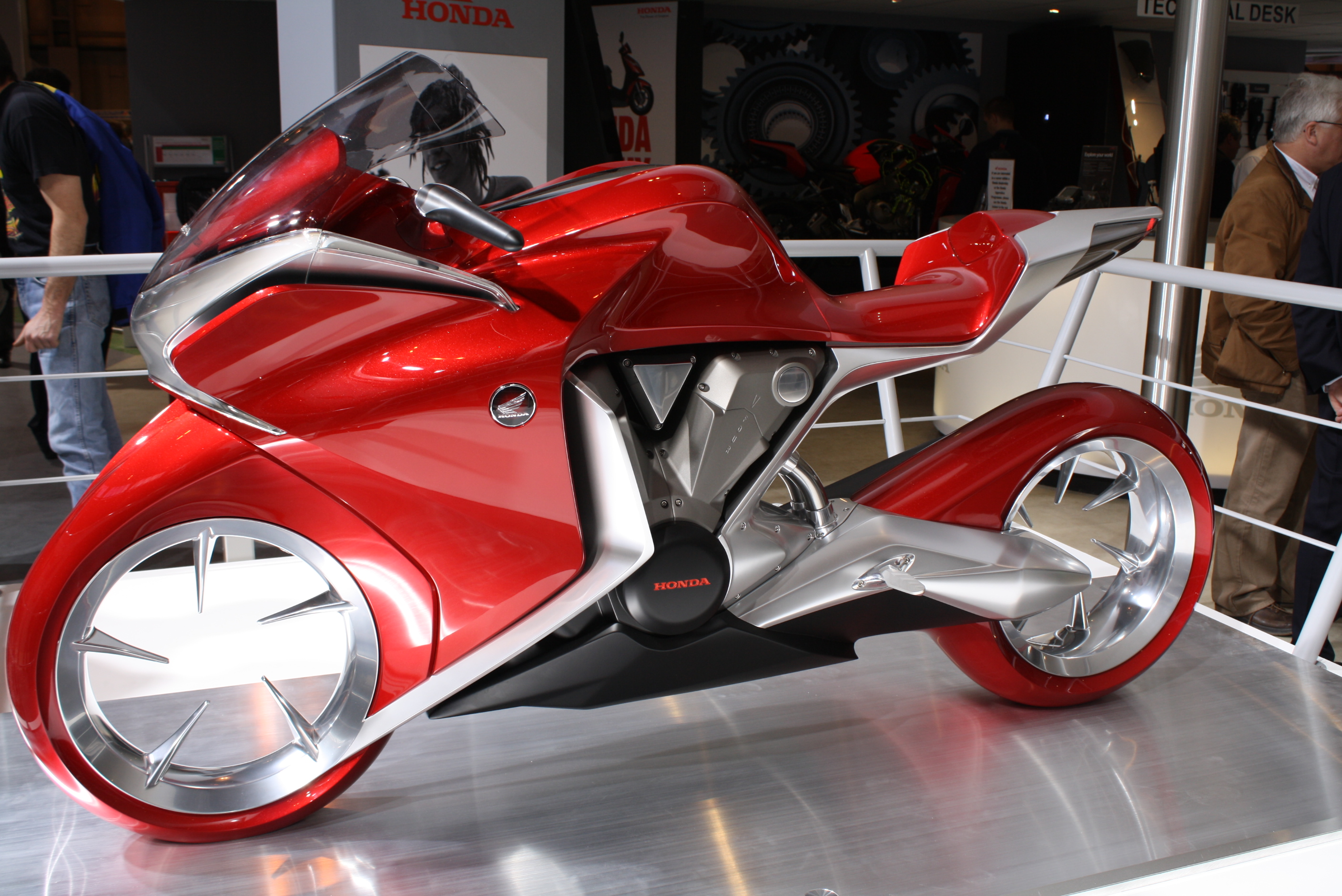
Honda V4 Concept Model.

The first V4 concept bike was unveiled at the 2008 Intermot show in Cologne, Germany. It had distinctive design elements that were to appear in the production VFR1200F, in particular the X-shaped headlights. Leaks and spy photos of a new Honda appeared in various places including online and print news outlets. Honda created teaser websites in Fall 2009, in which parts of the a new V4 were shown tantalizingly, and a countdown timer was displayed. Eight years after the introduction of the previous 6th generation VFR800 Honda unveiled the production VFR1200F at the 2009 Tokyo Motor Show.

== Production ==
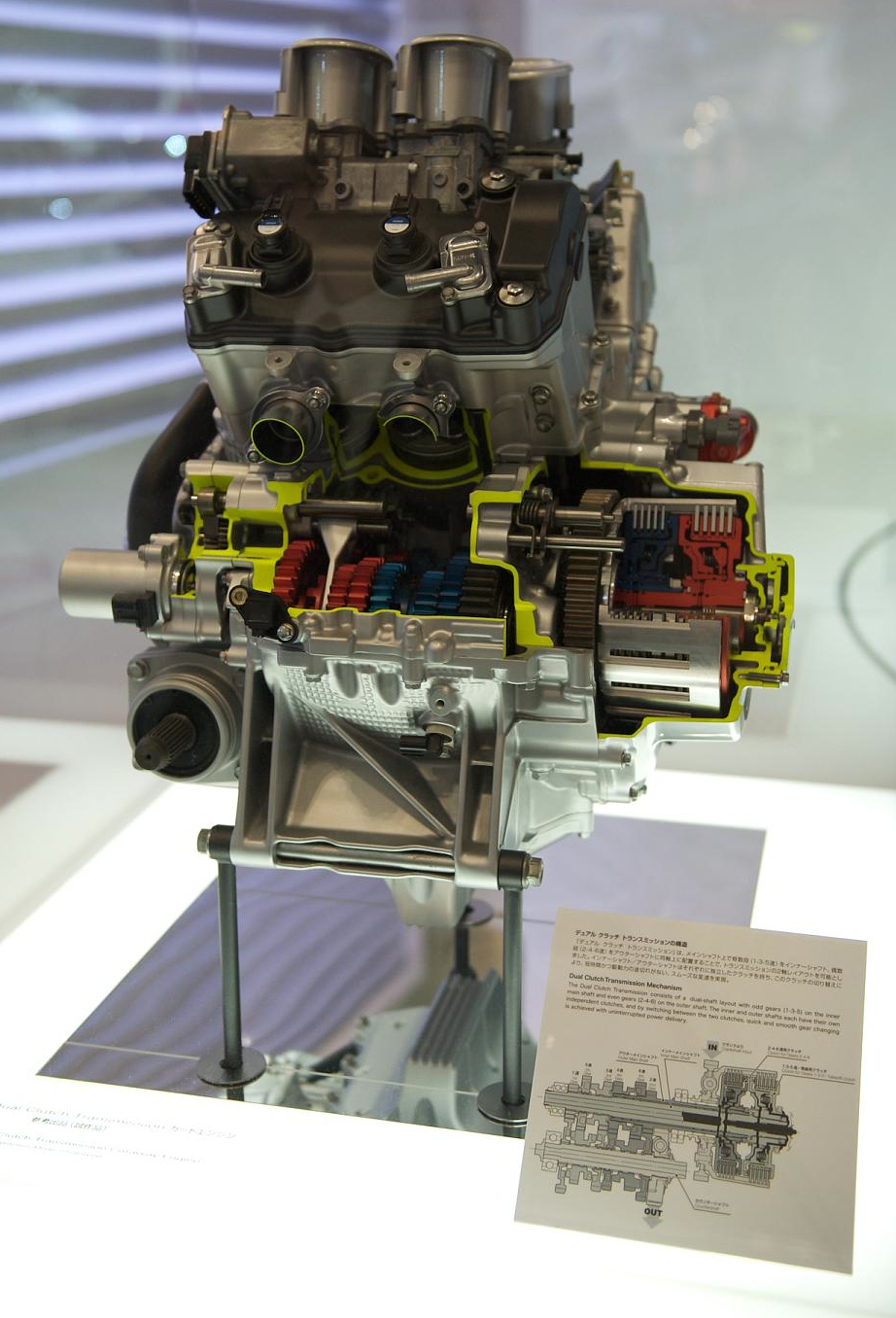
Honda VFR1200F engine with dual-clutch transmission at the 2009 Tokyo Motor Show.

Production of the VFR1200F began in October 2009 and first models were delivered in early 2010. The transverse-mounted V4 architecture is kept from previous VFR models though the engine and gearbox are completely new with displacement increased from 800 to 1200 cubic centimeters. A slightly de-tuned version of the engine, and the same gearbox, have been used on the VFR1200X Crosstourer, a dual-sport motorcycle launched in 2011.

=== Design ===
The VFR1200F was primarily designed in Honda's Italian and German design studios under the supervision of Spanish designer Teofilo Plaza. The exterior features a variety of aerodynamic enhancements taken from the Honda MotoGP bike including a dual-layered fairing designed to pull heat away from the rider and an X-shaped bulbous front nose to keep the vehicle stable at high speeds as well as increase turn-in handling. While the new design was viewed with mixed to negative reactions by the general public and press, Plaza was supported by other designers who felt the VFR represented a new design trend where the function is the primary design goal with aesthetics used to complement the aerodynamic profile of the motorcycle.

=== Engine ===
The new engine incorporates the single overhead camshaft distribution system called "Unicam" which was tested on Honda's offroad machines. This compact system reduces engine size, allowing it to be placed further forward in the frame while lowering the bike's center of gravity. This allows for better front-wheel traction when cornering. A 28° positioning of crank pins and a specific firing order of the cylinders (1&4 and 2&3 layout instead of the regular 1&3 and 2&4) resulted in an engine with perfect primary balance. Because of this, there is no balance shaft, further lightening the engine.

Instead of conventional direct mechanical connection from the rider's twistgrip to the throttle, electronic throttle control ("throttle by wire") commands the engine control unit to modulate engine power output.

The configuration of the cylinders is also unusual. The V4 has the rear bank of cylinders paired closely together, with the big ends of their connecting rods on the inner sides of the crank journals. The forward bank of cylinders is conversely set outboard of the rear bank, with the big end journals mounted on the outer sides of the crank journals. This design allows for a much narrower engine at the rear, which makes the bike slimmer where it contacts the rider and allows an easier reach to the ground from the seat.

=== Transmission ===
The VFR1200F is available with either a conventional constant-mesh manual transmission, with shaft-drive, or an automatic dual-clutch transmission (DCT). The DCT version, known in North America as the VFR1200A or in other markets as the VFR1200D, has dual clutches, one operating 1st, 3rd and 5th gears, the other operating 2nd, 4th, and 6th gears. The dual clutches are able to switch quickly between gears and can operate in one of three modes: 'D', which is a fuel-efficient fully automatic mode; 'S', a sports automatic mode, which changes gear at higher engine speeds; and manual mode, in which the rider changes gear using paddles fitted to the handlebars. This gearbox was the first of its type fitted to a large capacity motorcycle, although dual-clutch transmissions were already used in a number of automobiles. The DCT gearbox retains characteristics of a conventional manual transmission like engine braking and clutch engagement as the internal components are very similar except the clutch operation is controlled by an electric motor and computer rather than the rider.

Both models feature a slipper clutch to reduce wheel spin during hard engine braking and a shaft-drive system to transmit power to the rear wheel. The shaft-drive system is bolted to the frame on a swinging pivot mount. Engineers developed a two-part shaft connected by a spline that allows the system to flex under load mimicking the feel and performance benefits of a traditional chain drive.

=== Brakes ===
The VFR1200F incorporates the C-ABS combined braking system sourced from the CBR600RR and CBR1000RR sportbikes. C-ABS distributes the braking forces completely electronically sending information from the brake lever into a separate braking computer before the system applies hydraulic pressure to the brakes. Anti-lock brakes (ABS) now as standard equipment rather than optional equipment as they were in the previous generation. During front brake lever activation, all the right-side caliper pistons are applied, along with four of the pistons on the left side. When the rear brake is applied, the other two left-side pistons are actuated. To maintain equal braking force when using just the front brake, the right-side pistons are slightly smaller than the left-side pistons.

== Reception ==
Reactions to the production VFR1200 were mixed at its introduction. Some had expected a return of the VFR to its racing past because of a much more sport-focused concept model along with V4 engine architecture sourced from the Honda RC212V MotoGP bike. Others noted Honda continued its tradition of using the VFR line to showcase new technologies: the previous VFR800 introduced Honda's VTEC to the worldwide market, and the new VFR1200 became the first production motorcycle to have a DCT automatic transmission. Traction control was added to all 2012 models at no additional cost though it was not available on first-year models.

The reduction in fuel tank capacity from 22 L (4.8 imp gal; 5.8 US gal) on the previous VFR800 down to 18.5 L (4.1 imp gal; 4.9 US gal) on the VFR1200F has been the main complaint raised by motorcyclists, coupled with the new engine's higher-than-expected fuel consumption. On-road tests have shown a maximum distance from a single tank of less than 300 kilometres (186 mi), with some press reviewers running out of fuel after just 240 kilometres (150 mi).

== Ariel Ace ==
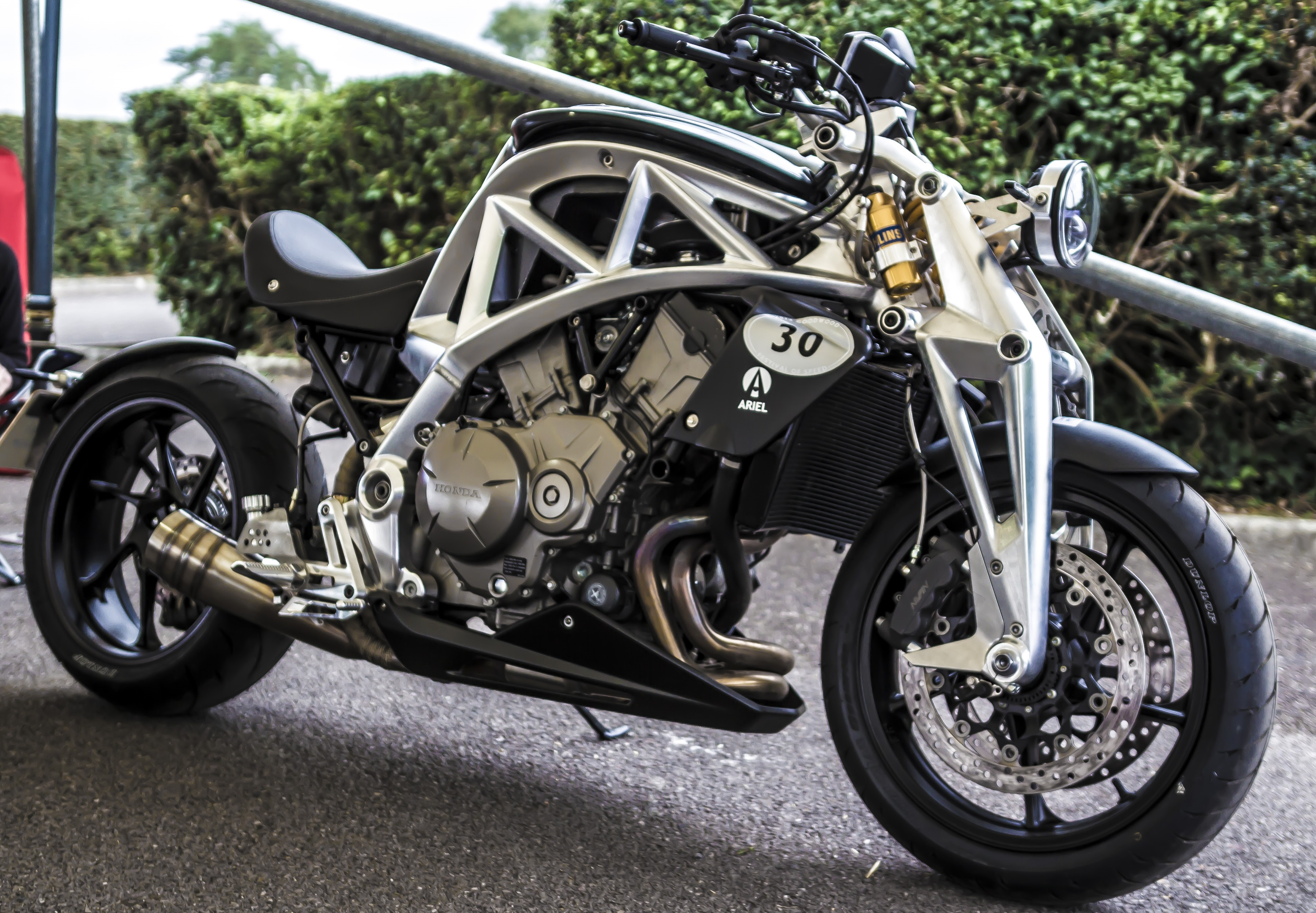
Ariel Ace sport bike

Honda has agreed to supply the Ariel Motor Company, British makers of the Ariel Atom sports car, with the VFR1200's V4 engine for use in a new motorcycle, the Ariel Ace.
