= SureStop =

American cycle parts manufacturer

- Founded: 2009; 17 years ago as Slidepad Technologies
- Headquarters: Irvine, California
- Key people: Brian Riley CEO, co-founder, Andrew Ouelett Co-founder, Al Nordin Executive Advisor
- Products: Bicycle brakes

SureStop is an anti-lock bicycle brake technology and manufacturing company. It was founded in 2009 in Palo Alto, California, as SlidePad by Brian Riley and Andrew Ouellet.

As of 2021, SureStop is headquartered in Irvine, California, with a subsidiary in Shenzhen.

== History ==
Slidepad was started by Riley and Ouellet while students at Cal Poly, San Luis Obispo. Ouellet received inspiration for the product after he crashed his bicycle when applying too much pressure on his front brakes, resulting in front wheel lockup. In 2009, Riley and Ouellet entered their initial design in Cal Poly’s Business Plan competition and won 1st place. In 2013 Alan Nordin, former president of Fallbrook Technologies' bicycle division, joined the company as an executive advisor.

In 2011, Slidepad Technologies formed an agreement with a Taiwanese manufacturer to build a Slidepad braking system for OEM distribution. Jamis Bicycles was the first bike-manufacturer to specify the technology on their 2013 models. Stanford University and Jamis Bicycles currently use Slidepad technology.

In November 2012, the company took a 40-day, 11,000 miles (18,000 km), "Save Your Teeth Tour" across 90 bike shops from Palo Alto, California, to New Jersey.

In 2014 the company rebranded from SlidePad to SureStop.

On April 14, 2017, the product was on Season 8 Episode 21 of Shark Tank. Brian Riley and Kyle Jansen, another founder, accepted a deal with Mark Cuban.

== Description ==
SureStop is a system for bicycles aimed at making the correct application of braking force easier for novice or casual cyclists. It integrates into V-brake systems to provide single-lever braking for front and rear brakes. It modulates the front brake force in real time, based on the road surface and rider weight position, and avoids front wheel lockup accidents when applying the front brake. It was designed to prevent riders from flipping over their handlebars when applying the front brake. Once the brake pads make contact with the rear wheel, the Slidepad slides forward, which pulls a cable that is connected to the front brakes. Similar to the anti-lock brake system in cars, the mechanism prevents the front wheel from locking, no matter how hard the brake is pressed or how slippery the road conditions are.

== See also ==
Combined braking system
