= Equipmake =

British electric motor and bus manufacturer

- Industry: Manufacturing
- Founded: 1997; 29 years ago
- Founder: Ian Foley
- Headquarters: Snetterton, Norfolk, England
- Products: Electric motors
- Number of employees: 60
- Website: equipmake.co.uk

Equipmake is a British manufacturer of electric motors for cars and buses based in Snetterton, Norfolk, England.

== History ==
Equipmake was founded in 1997 by Ian Foley, who had worked in motorsports engineering with 24 Hours of Le Mans and Formula One teams Lotus Engineering, Benetton Formula and Lotus F1. The company was founded when Foley developed a paddle shift gearbox purpose-built for endurance racing, and by the 2000s, Equipmake was involved in researching electric motors and flywheels prior to Formula 1's move to hybrid powertrains in the 2014 season.

Equipmake engineered a hybrid flywheel with Williams Racing in 2009, which saw success in both F1 and Le Mans endurance racing under Williams Hybrid Power. The flywheel also found applications for hybrid buses and commercial vehicles. Foley left Williams in 2014 to concentrate on Equipmake, with the company developing a new series of electric motors shortly afterwards.

The company experienced considerable growth from 2017 onwards as a result of commercial vehicle operators beginning to operate new and converted battery electric vehicles. Staff numbers grew from 15 employees to 52 between 2017 and 2019 as a result of growing orders. Originally based in the village of Hethel, Equipmake moved to its present headquarters in Snetterton in December 2019, with the opening attended by then-Secretary of State for International Trade (and local MP) Liz Truss. This factory was designed as part of Equipmake's development of a battery-electric bus chassis, receiving £7.5 million of funding from the Advanced Propulsion Centre nonprofit.

== Products ==
=== Ariel HiPerCAR ===
Sports car manufacturer Ariel began collaborating with Equipmake in 2014 to develop the Ariel HiPerCAR (High Performance Carbon Reduction), which was unveiled at the Millbrook Proving Ground in September 2017. Built on an aluminium monocoque chassis and weighing around 1,600 kilograms (3,500 lb), Equipmake's involvement in the HiPerCAR project was the development of a set of four electric motors that produced a combined 1,200 brake horsepower (890 kW), powered by a 42 kWh liquid-cooled battery. As a result, the flagship four-wheel drive HiPerCAR could run at a range of 100–120 miles (160–190 km) without range extensions, and topped out at a restricted top speed of 160 miles per hour (260 km/h), though it was capable of accelerating from 0–100 miles per hour (0–161 km/h) in 3.8 seconds. A slightly slower two-wheel drive option was also announced at the show. An updated HiPerCAR with a body assembled with 3D-printed panelwork was revealed by Ariel and Equipmake in 2022, planned to enter mainstream production between late 2024 and early 2025 under a new model name.

=== Electric bus conversions ===
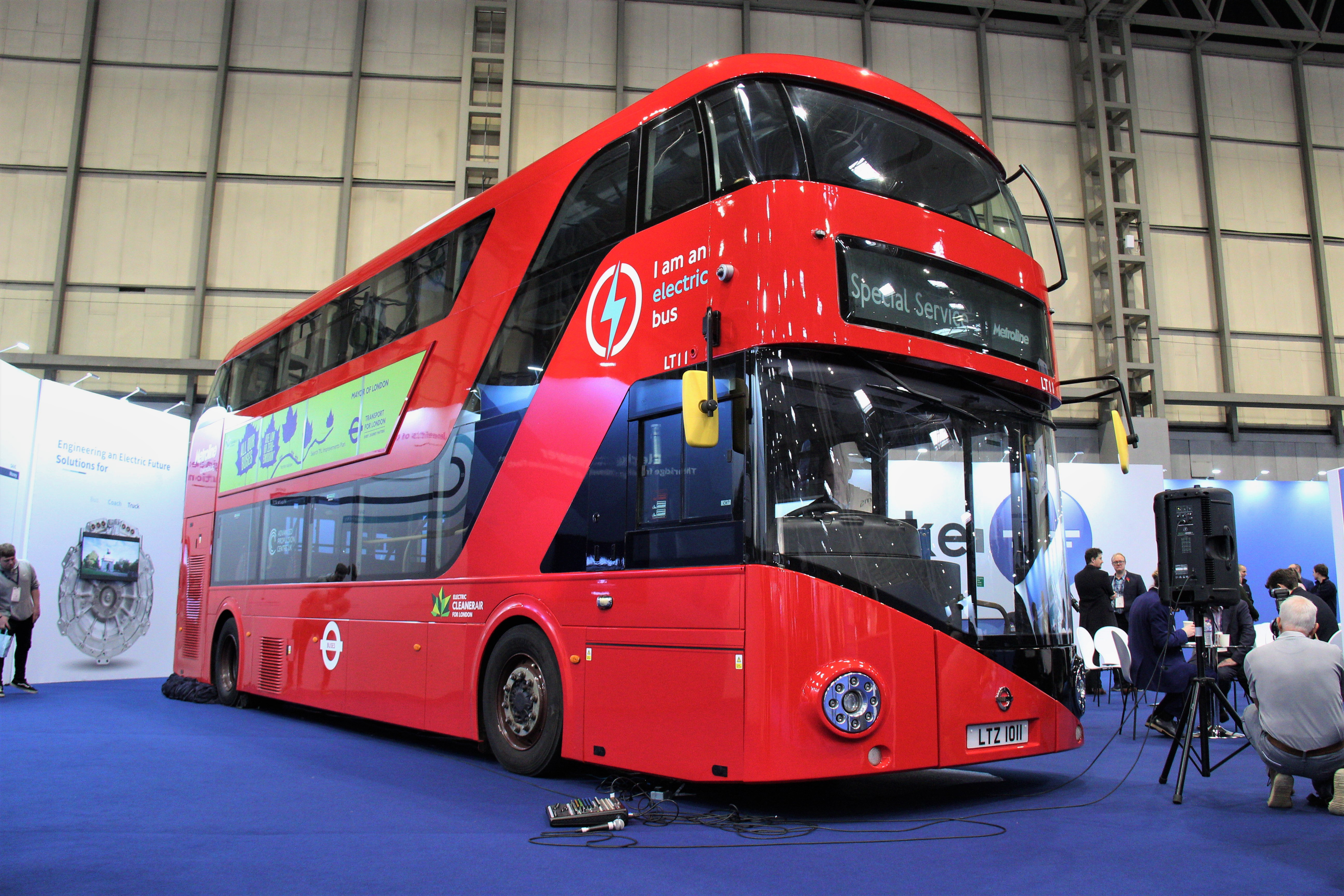
A hybrid-electric New Routemaster double-decker bus with a Equipmake battery-electric drivetrain at the 2022 Euro Bus Expo

Equipmake entered into a contract with York public bus operator First York to repower its fleet of 12 Optare Versa single-deck battery electric buses, which were originally built between 2014 and 2015 and were withdrawn due to having life-expired batteries. The repowers, which Equipmake claimed gave the buses a 150 miles (240 km) range, commenced in 2022. The first repowered Versa entered service with First York in March 2023, with the contract officially completed by April 2024.

A hybrid-electric New Routemaster was repowered with Equipmake's Zero Emission Drive, with a 400kWh battery giving the bus a 150 miles (240 km) range. The bus re-entered service at Metroline's Holloway garage in November 2022 on a six-month evaluation period.

In March 2023, Equipmake announced it had entered into a partnership with coach operator Westway Coaches to repower some of its existing diesel coach fleet. A Zero Emission Drive was first installed in a Westway Van Hool T917, allowing for a range of 220 miles (350 km) using a 545kWh battery. Elsewhere, Big Bus Tours' London operations partnered with Equipmake to convert 20 of its Ankai diesel open-top buses to battery electric, with the first ten converted buses launched into service in June 2024, while that same year, fellow London open-top bus operator Golden Tours also contracted Equipmake to perform battery electric conversions on its Wright Gemini 3 and MCV EvoSeti-bodied Volvo B5TL sightseeing buses.

Equipmake began offering conversions for closed-top double-decker buses with an agreement in August 2023 to convert eight double-deckers from the Newport Bus fleet - four Alexander Dennis Enviro400s and three Volvo B5LH hybrids - to battery electric drive. In June 2024, Equipmake announced it would offer electric conversions for the integral Wright StreetDeck, replacing the diesel driveline in the space of there weeks with 436 kWh batteries to provide a range of 200 miles (320 km), directly competing for conversion orders with the recently launched NewPower subsidiary by the StreetDeck's manufacturer Wrightbus.

=== Integral electric buses ===
Equipmake has also developed its own integral range of electric buses. A double-decker bus named the Equipmake Jewel E, bodied by Spanish body manufacturer Beulas on a Brazilian-Argentine Agrale chassis and built to Transport for London specification, was unveiled by Equipmake in 2021, powered by three optioned modular battery packs capable of a 543kWh charge capacity that give the bus a 300 miles (480 km) maximum range. The Jewel E was due to enter demonstration service with Go-Ahead London in early 2022.

Equipmake and Agrale later developed the Agrale MT17.0 LEe, a 12 m (39 ft) low-cost battery electric single-deck bus built with a battery range of 150 mi (240 km) and capable of carrying 70 passengers, for the South American market. After road trials and durability tests in the United Kingdom in 2021, a prototype model was shipped to Argentina in July 2022 and entered service in Buenos Aires on trial with Doscientos Ocho Transporte Automotor S. A. (DOTA) in October 2022. The first production MT17.0 LEe, its body domestically built in Argentina by Todo Bus, later entered service with DOTA in August 2024, and an order for 50 Equipmake drivelines for delivery between 2025 and 2026 were placed by Agrale in September 2025, followed by a repeat order for 23 in February 2026.
