= Honda Crosstourer =

Adventure motorcycle by Honda

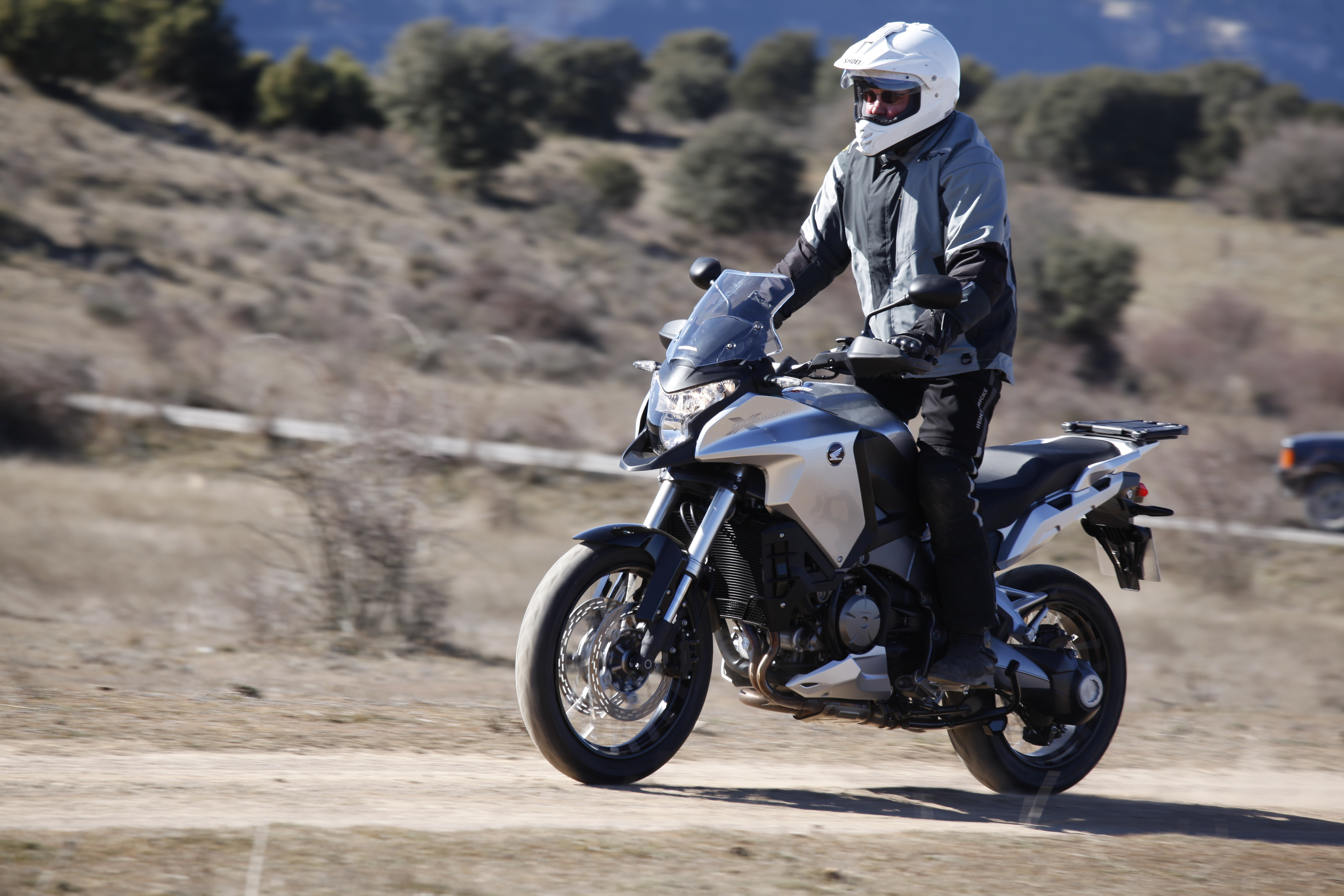
- Manufacturer: Honda
- Also called: Honda VFR1200X
- Production: 2012-2016 (retail old stock) to present
- Class: Adventure
- Engine: 1,237 cc (75.5 cu in) 76° V4
- Bore / stroke: 81 mm × 60 mm (3.2 in × 2.4 in)
- Compression ratio: 12:1
- Power: 95 kW (127 hp) @ 7,750 rpm (claimed)
- Torque: 126 N⋅m (93 lbf⋅ft) @ 6,500 rpm (claimed)
- Transmission: 6-speed sequential manual transmission 6-speed dual clutch transmission Shaft final drive
- Frame type: Diamond; aluminium twin-spar
- Brakes: Front : dual 310 mm discs Rear : single 276 mm disk Combined / ABS
- Tyres: Wire-spoke rims. Front: 110/80-R19; Rear : 150/70-R17
- Rake, trail: 28° / 107 mm (4.2 in)
- Wheelbase: 1,595 mm (62.8 in)
- Dimensions: L: 2,285 mm (90.0 in); W: 915 mm (36.0 in); H: 1,335 mm (52.6 in)
- Seat height: 850 mm (33 in)
- Weight: Manual: 277 kg (611 lb); DCT: 285 kg (628 lb) (wet)
- Fuel capacity: 21.5 litres (4.7 imp gal; 5.7 US gal)
- Related: Honda VFR1200F

The Honda Crosstourer (also called VFR1200X) is an adventure motorcycle made by Honda since 2012. It was announced at the 2011 EICMA motorcycle show in Milan. The 1,237 cc (75.5 cu in) V4 engine is a re-tuned version of the engine that was first used on the 2010 VFR1200F model. The fuel injection mapping, camshaft, and valve timing have all been revised to produce lower power than the VFR1200F, claimed by Honda to be 95 kW (127 hp) versus 127 kW (170 hp), but the power output is focused at lower and middle engine speeds.

The Crosstourer is equipped with either a conventional six-speed sequential manual transmission as fitted to most motorcycles, or a dual clutch transmission (DCT), which allows the rider to change gears manually without a clutch lever, or leave it to the gearbox to select the appropriate gear as an automatic transmission would. The DCT system is also used on the VFR1200F, the first use of DCT on any motorcycle. Like the VFR1200F, the Crosstourer uses a shaft final drive.

The Crosstourer was launched to compete in the adventure-touring market with the BMW R1200GS, the Yamaha XT1200Z Super Ténéré, and the Triumph Tiger Explorer.
