= Honda VFR800 =

Sport touring motorcycle

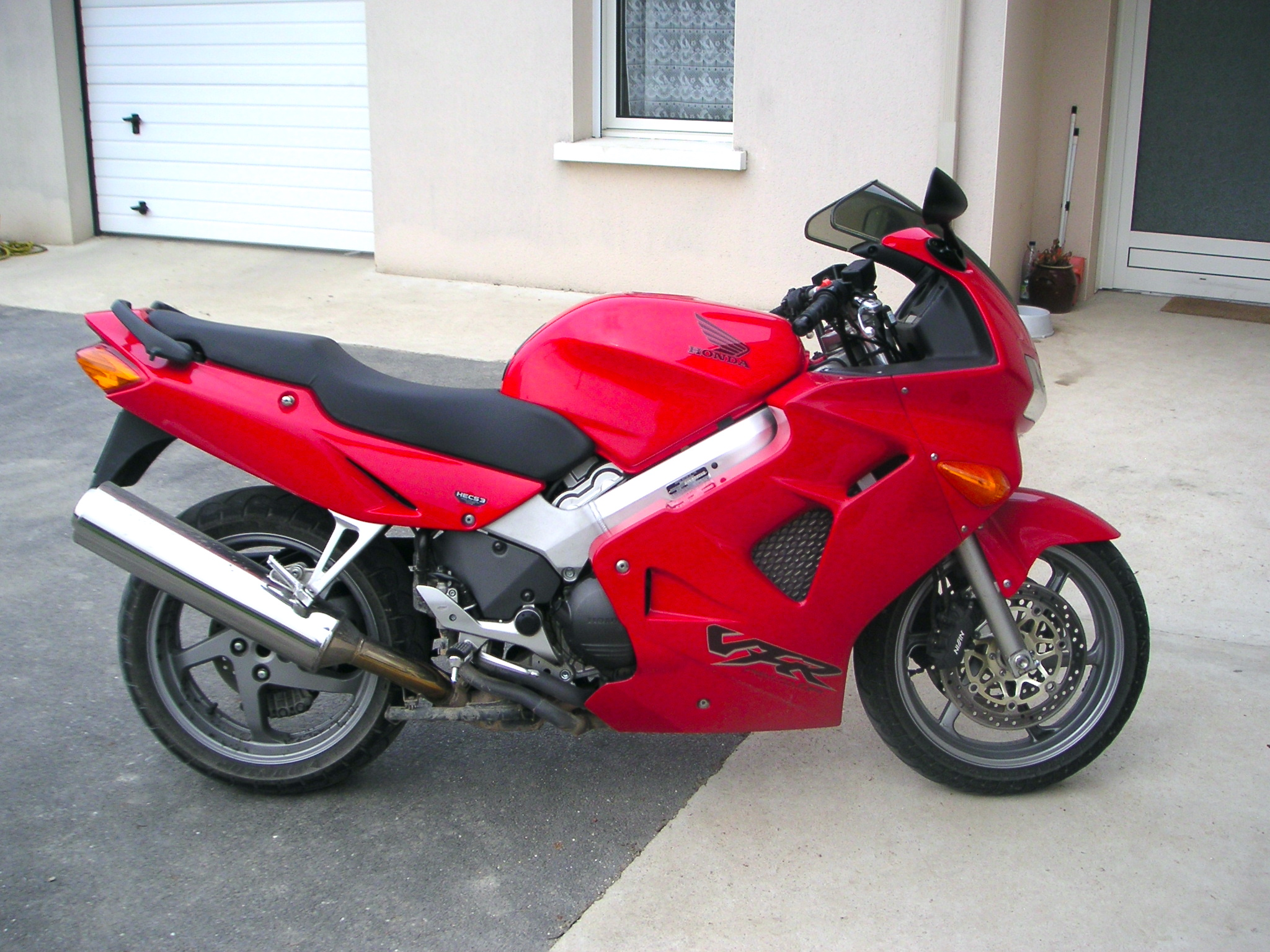
- Manufacturer: Honda
- Also called: Interceptor
- Production: 1998–2021
- Predecessor: VFR750F
- Class: Sport bike
- Engine: 782 cc (47.7 cu in) liquid-cooled 4-stroke 16-valve DOHC V4 90°
- Bore / stroke: 72 mm × 48 mm (2.8 in × 1.9 in)
- Compression ratio: 11.8:1
- Transmission: 6-speed, constant-mesh, manual, chain-drive
- Brakes: 2 × 310 mm (12 in) disc (front); 256 mm (10.1 in) disc (rear)
- Related: Crossrunner; VFR1200F

The Honda VFR800 (Interceptor) is a sports motorcycle made by Honda since 1998. The model was the successor to the VFR750F and shares the V4 engine configuration with the Honda VF and VFR series.

== Fifth generation: 1998–2001 VFR800Fi (RC46) ==
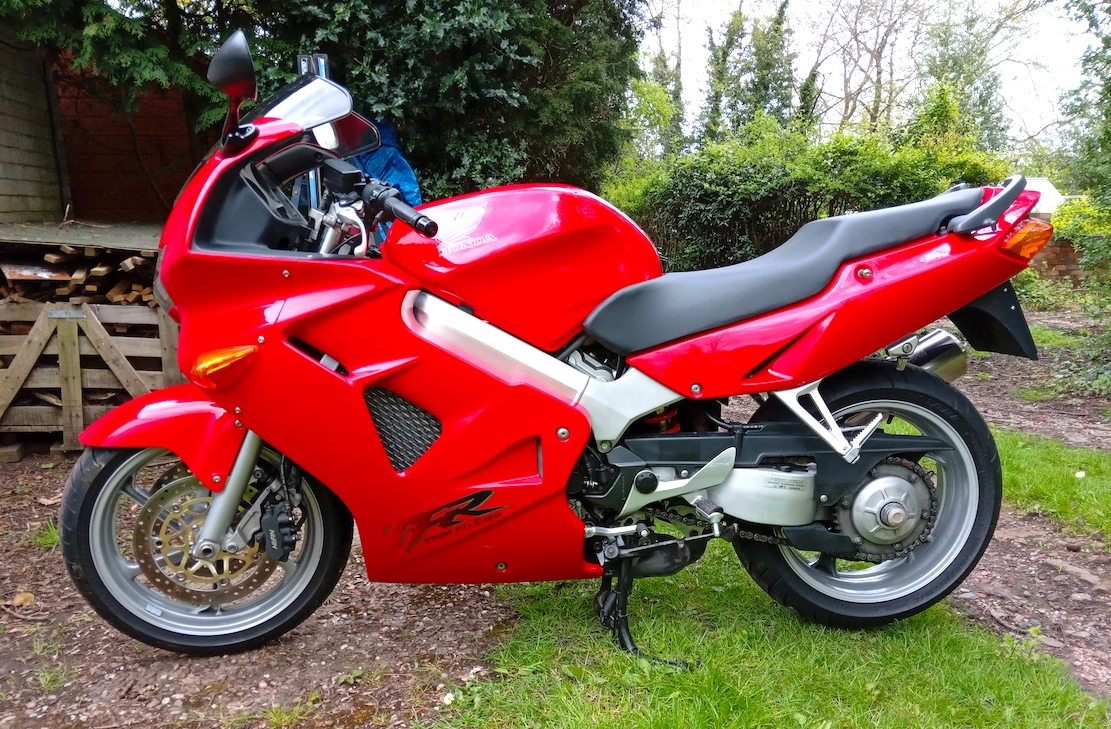
5th generation 1999 VFR800Fi

The VFR800 is only 34 cc greater in volume than the VFR750F but, being wider in bore and shorter in stroke, is both more oversquare and more powerful than its predecessor, with the stroke reduced from 48.6 to 48mm, and the bore increased from 70 to 72mm. Nevertheless, rather than being a direct development of the previous, carbureted VFR750F engine, the VFR800 engine was a detuned power plant based on the fuel-injected engine designed for the RC45 of 1994. The RVF750R RC45 engine, although a development of the VFR750R RC30 and originally derived from the VFR750F RC24, was very different from Honda's previous V4s as the gear drive for the camshafts was moved from the center of the engine to the engine's right-side (next to the clutch-pack). Another change was the two side-mounted radiators as opposed to one at the front of the engine front as on the VFR750. The engine was tuned for road use in the VFR800, so that torque was improved throughout the rev range while maximum power was only slightly higher than the VFR750.

The VFR800's frame uses the engine as a stressed member, this was derived from the VTR1000 Firestorm, and retains the trademark VFR single-sided swingarm pivoted from the aft of the crankcase. It uses normal 'right-side-up' front forks.

In 2000, Honda updated the fifth-generation VFR (RC46) with a catalytic converter, oxygen sensors, and an EFI system that would enter closed-loop mode under highway (cruising) operation. These also came with a temperature-actuated fast idle system, negating the need for a choke lever. The rear-view mirrors got updated as well, with Honda forgoing the old rubberized stalks, instead opting for rustproof metal ones. Bikes supplied for Europe also came with the H.I.S.S. (Honda Ignition Security System) immobiliser system in an effort to combat theft.

=== Dual combined braking system (CBS) ===
The VFR800 has a CBS linked braking system. This is a departure from traditional motorcycle braking system where front and rear braking are independent of each other. In this system, the front brake lever applies pressure to four (or later Gen 6, five) of the six front brake caliper pistons. The rotational movement of the left caliper when engaged actuates a secondary master cylinder and applies pressure to one of the rear caliper's pistons. The rear brake pedal is directly attached to the remaining pistons (two in the rear, and one or two in the front).

The CBS system is designated "dual" as both hand lever and foot pedal each control both front and rear brakes; commonly, the foot pedal only operates the rear brake. Honda first introduced this braking system on the 1992 Honda CBR1000F. It was based on the Unified Braking System that was introduced on the 1983 GL1100.

== Sixth generation: 2002–2013 VFR800 VTEC (RC46) ==
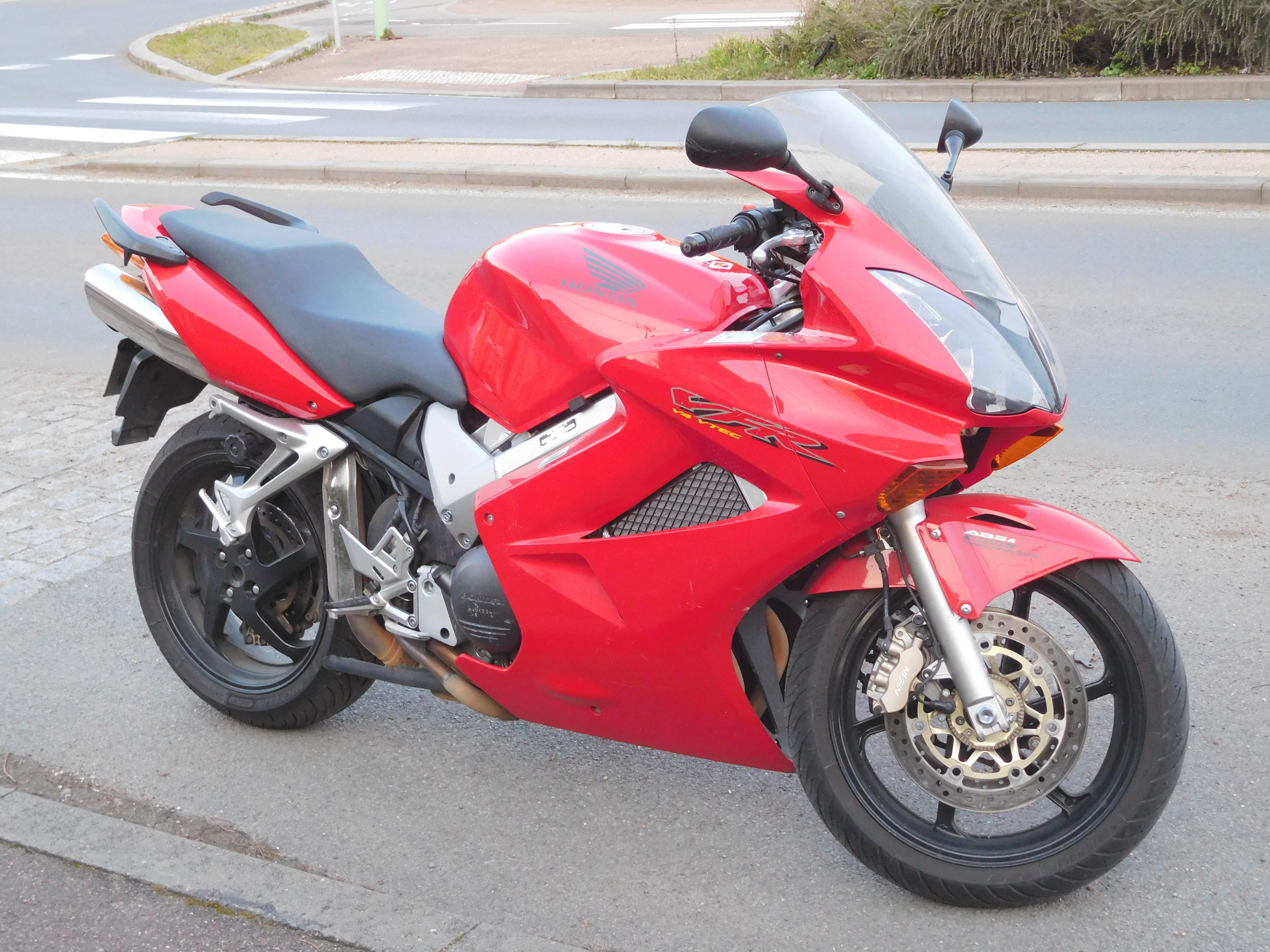
6th generation 2003 VFR800 VTEC

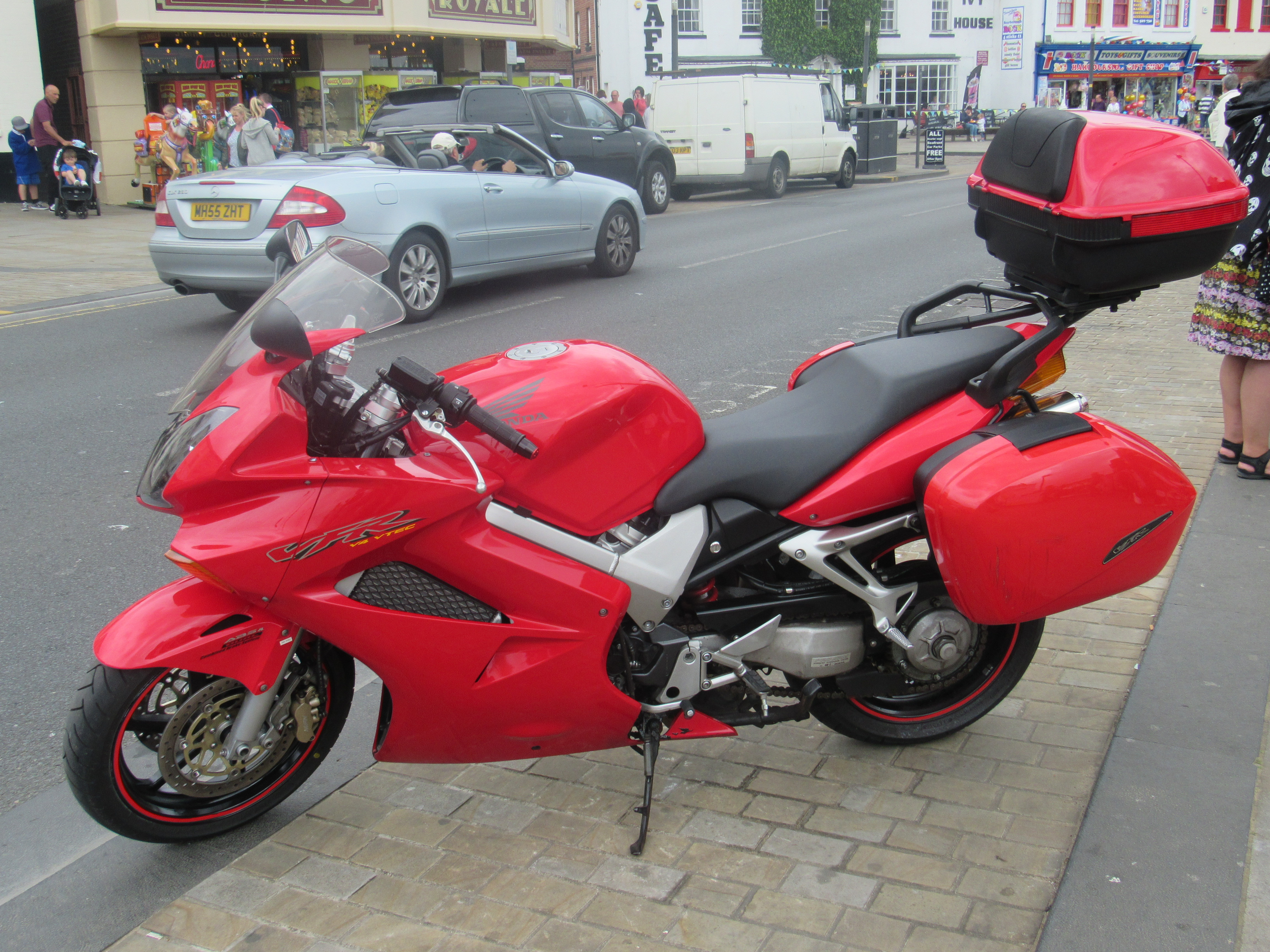
2003 Honda VFR800

The sixth generation VFR was introduced in 2002. It featured dual underseat exhausts, optional ABS, DCBS linked brakes, and optional hard luggage. It featured chain-driven cams rather than the gear-driven cams of earlier VFRs, and VTEC valve actuation.

In 2006 the VFR 800 received some minor upgrades, which included the change of the tachometer face from black to white, a re-mapped ECU to provide a smoother transition into VTEC, clear turn signal lenses and upgrades to the electrical wiring to fix issues with the charging system.

The VFR800 was phased out after the 2009 model year in the United States, when Honda introduced the larger VFR1200F; but the VFR1200 was not a direct replacement for the VFR800; the true successor being the 2014 VFR800F (RC79).

=== VTEC valve actuation ===
The VFR800 was the first non-JDM motorcycle to use VTEC valve-gear. Honda used VTEC to meet tightening noise and emissions standards and to increase the peak engine horsepower. Based on the VTEC-E system, the simplified motorcycle version of VTEC employs only two of the four valves per cylinder when operating at lower engine speeds. All four valves per cylinder are engaged above approximately 6,800 rpm. This is initiated by an electronically actuated oil spool valve, which sends oil pressure to the lifter actuators, which then move the engagement pins into place above the valve stem, allowing the remaining two valves to open. This design allows for variable valve timing as well, since the cam lobe profiles can be made different. After much criticism of the abruptness of power transition, Honda lowered the VTEC activation rpm threshold to 6,400 rpm in 2006. The VTEC disengages two cylinder valves when the engine speed drops again below 6,100 rpm.

== Eighth generation: 2014–2021 VFR800F (RC79) ==
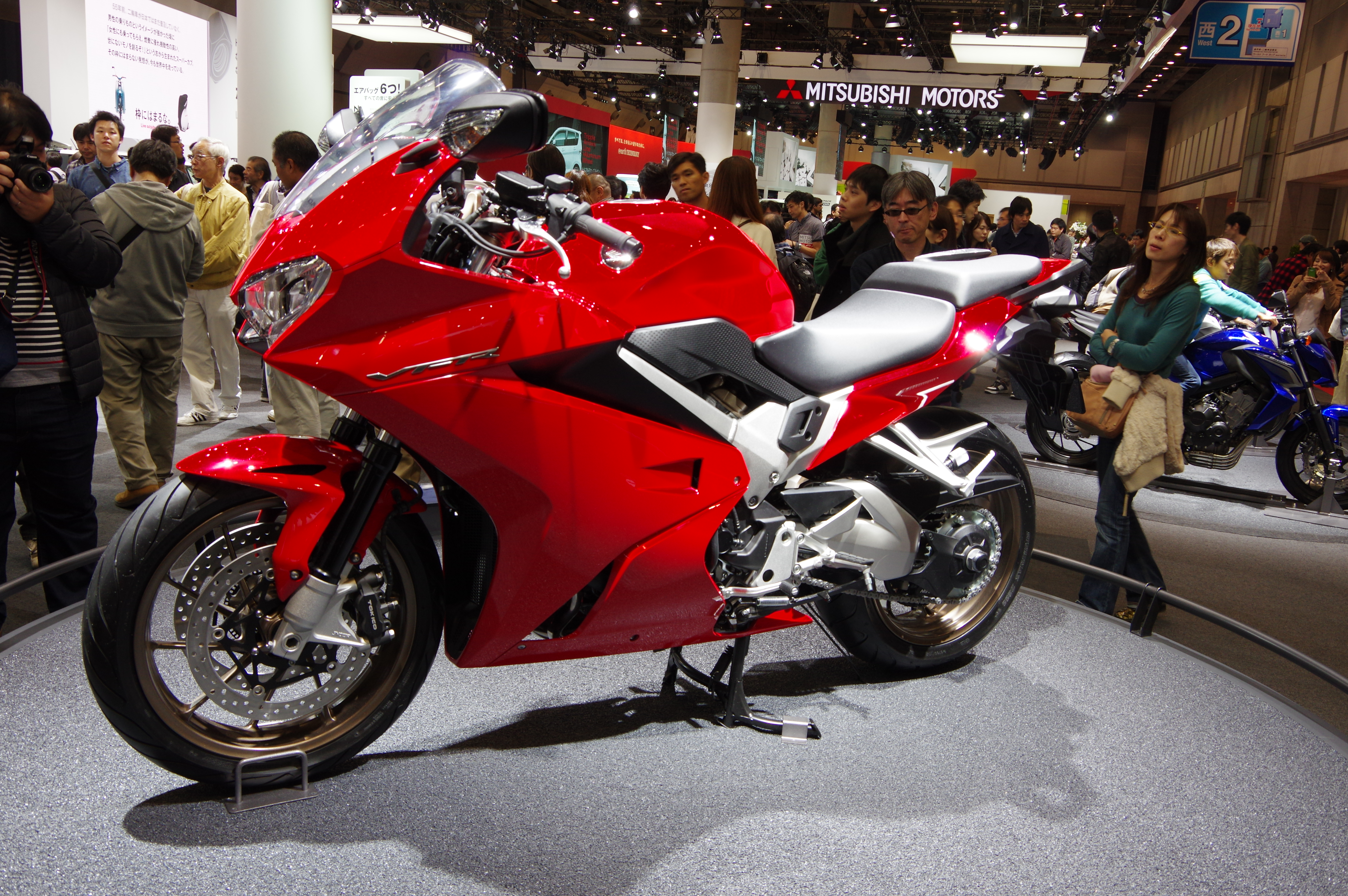
Eighth generation VFR800

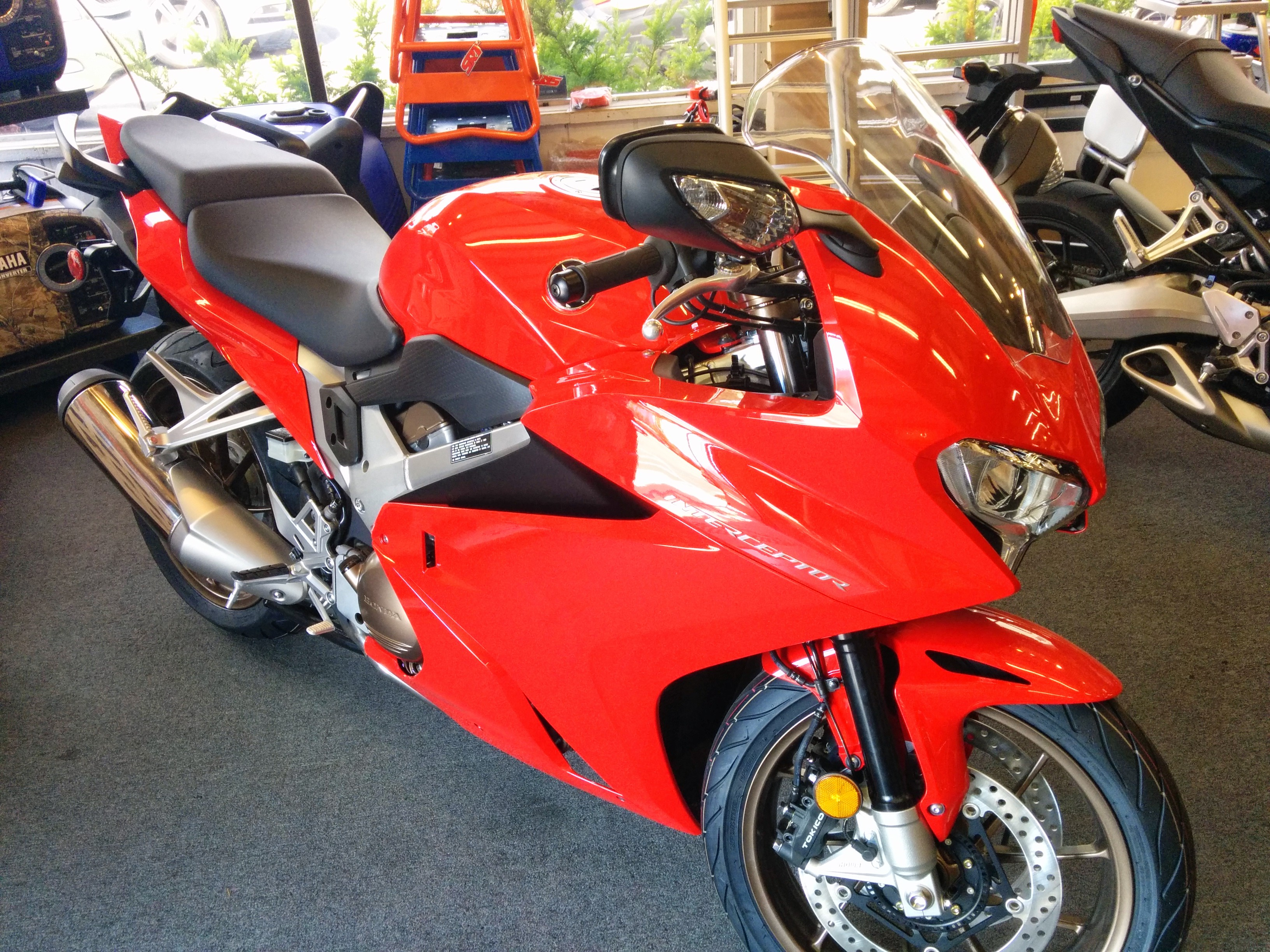
2014 Honda Interceptor

A facelifted VFR800 debuted at the 2013 EICMA show in Milan, Italy. The revised model features a new single sided exhaust system, akin to the fifth-generation one, lighter wheels, and additional mass-reduction, lowering the curb weight by 10 kg (22 lb). The new VFR also features traction control, a new instrument panel, and revised aerodynamic bodywork with LED lighting, though the engine and chassis remain largely unchanged from the previous sixth-generation model. Continued from the sixth-generation model is also the 2006 refined version of the VTEC system. The side-mounted radiators were dropped in favour of dual front-mounted units. The model is sold worldwide. In the US market, it is available in two versions: Standard and Deluxe. The Deluxe version adds ABS, traction control, grip heaters, center stand, and self-canceling turn signals. Outside the US, only the Deluxe version is sold. The RC79 was only offered for two model years in the US: 2014 and 2015.

== Variants ==
The VFR800P is the police variant of the VFR800.

== Comparison ==
| Model year | 5th gen (1998–2001) | 6th gen (2002–2013) | 8th gen (2014–2021) |
Engine
| Engine type | 781.7 cc (47.70 cu in) liquid-cooled 4-stroke DOHC 4-valve per cylinder 90° V4 | | |
| Bore × stroke | 72 mm × 48 mm (2.8 in × 1.9 in) | | |
| Compression ratio | 11.6:1 | | 11.8:1 |
| Power | 80 PS (59 kW) @ 9500 rpm (Japan); 108 hp (81 kW) | 80 PS (59 kW) @ 9500 rpm (Japan); 107 hp (80 kW) @ 10500 rpm | 104 hp (78 kW) @ 10250 rpm |
| Torque | | | 75.1 N⋅m (55.4 lbf⋅ft) @ 8500 rpm |
| Valve train | DOHC, four valves per cylinder | | |
| Camshaft drive | Straight-cut gearing | Chain drive, VTEC included | |
| Fuel delivery | PGM-FI electronic fuel injection | | |
| Ignition | Digital | | |
| Lubrication | Wet sump, SAE 10W-40 | | Wet sump, SAE 10W-30 |
Drivetrain
| Transmission | 6-speed w/multi-plate clutch | | |
| Final drive | #530 O-ring chain | | #525 O-ring chain |
Chassis, suspension, brakes
| Front suspension | 41 mm Honda Multi-Action System (HMAS) cartridge-style telescopic fork w/preload adjustable damper, 120 mm (4.7 in) travel | 43 mm HMAS cartridge-style telescopic fork w/ preload adjustable damper, 100 mm (3.9 in) travel | 43 mm HMAS telescopic fork w/ stepless preload and ten DF adjustments, 108 mm (4.3 in) travel |
| Rear suspension | Single-sided swingarm with single spring with rebound-adjustable gas-charged damper, 120 mm (4.7 in) travel | | Single-sided swingarm with single spring with preload and rebound damping adjustability, 120 mm (4.7 in) travel |
| Front brakes | Dual 296 mm (11.7 in) discs with three-piston calipers | | Dual 310 mm (12 in) discs with four-piston calipers |
| Rear brakes | Single 256 mm (10.1 in) disc with three-piston caliper | | Single 256 mm (10.1 in) disc with two-piston caliper |
| Front tire | 120/70ZR-17 | | |
| Rear tire | 180/55ZR-17 | | |
Dimensions
| Length | 2,120 mm (83 in) | | 2,134 mm (84.0 in) |
| Width | 735 mm (28.9 in) | | 770 mm (30 in) |
| Height | 1,195 mm (47.0 in) | | 1,203 mm (47.4 in) |
| Wheelbase | 1,440 mm (57 in) | 1,458 mm (57.4 in) | 1,460 mm (57 in) |
| Seat height | 805 mm (31.7 in) | | 789–809 mm (31.1–31.9 in) |
| Wet weight | 226 kg (498 lb) | 242 kg (534 lb) | 239 kg (527 lb) |
| Fuel Capacity | 20.8 L (4.6 imp gal; 5.5 US gal) | 22.0 L (4.8 imp gal; 5.8 US gal) | 21.2 L (4.7 imp gal; 5.6 US gal) |
| Rake | 25.5° | | |
| Trail | 100 mm (3.9 in) | | 95 mm (3.7 in) |

== See also ==
- Honda VF and VFR
- Honda VFR400
- VFR1200F
