= Honda Crossrunner =

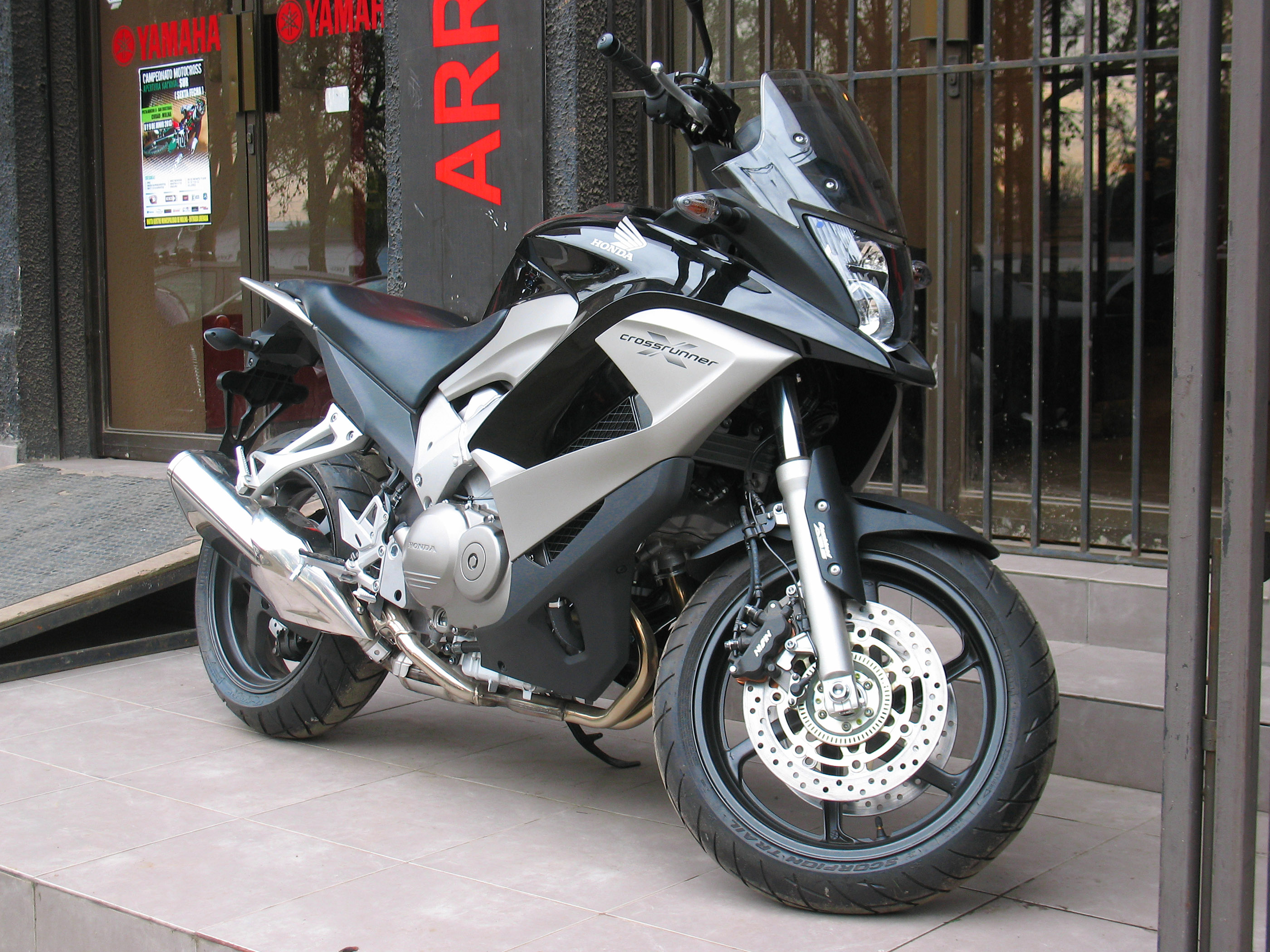
- Manufacturer: Honda
- Also called: Honda VFR800X
- Production: 2011–present
- Class: Standard or adventure touring crossover
- Engine: 782 cc (47.7 cu in) liquid-cooled 4-stroke 16-valve DOHC 90° V4
- Bore / stroke: 72.0 mm × 48.0 mm (2.83 in × 1.89 in)
- Compression ratio: 11.6:1
- Power: 74.9 kW (100.4 hp) @ 10,000 rpm
- Torque: 72.8 N⋅m (53.7 lbf⋅ft) @ 9,500 rpm
- Transmission: 6-speed manual, chain final drive
- Frame type: Twin spar aluminium
- Brakes: Front: Dual 296 mm discs with 3-pot calipers Rear:Single 256 mm disc combined with ABS
- Tyres: Front: 120/70 R17; Rear: 180/55 R17
- Rake, trail: 25.75° / 96 mm (3.8 in)
- Wheelbase: 1,464 mm (57.6 in)
- Dimensions: L: 2,130 mm (84 in); W: 799 mm (31.5 in); H: 1,243 mm (48.9 in)
- Seat height: 816 mm (32.1 in)
- Weight: 240.4 kg (530 lb) (wet)
- Fuel capacity: 21.5 L (4.7 imp gal; 5.7 US gal)
- Oil capacity: 3.8 L (4.0 US qt)
- Related: Honda VRF800F

The Honda Crossrunner (also called VFR800X) is a versatile touring motorcycle launched by Honda at the 2010 EICMA Milan Motorcycle Show. It went on sale in 2011, with first deliveries later that summer. Its 782 cc (47.7 cu in) V4 engine was derived from the successful VFR800. While the VFR800 was a sport touring motorcycle, the Crossrunner has a low saddle, wide-handlebars, long-travel suspension, and special Pirelli Scorpion tires better suited to "soft roads".

== Development ==
Honda commissioned a European design team to assist in development. Preliminary tests included trying various Crossrunner prototypes in over 120 wind tunnel sessions to establish an optimum design for aerodynamic stability.

In September 2014, Honda Motor Europe announced that the 2015 Crossrunner, to be called the VFR800X, would have a revised 800 cc V4 engine and new bodywork. Also, there would be changes to the suspension, brakes and wheels.

== Reception ==
A Motor Cycle News (MCN) review said: "The Crossrunner stands out from the crowd and performs as a real world, day-in, day-out bike impressively well." Journalist Kevin Ash added: "It's a fine looking bike with a reassuring and satisfying chassis matched to a characterful and muscular engine that compels you to use it. But there's a downside, and these days it's a big one: fuel consumption."

In an MCN 5-bike review in 2015, the testers felt that the Yamaha MT-09 Tracer was a better bike and better value than all its competitors, namely: a Triumph Tiger 800XRx, a Triumph Tiger Sport, a Honda Crossrunner, and a Ducati Hyperstrada. With a kerb weight of 242kg, the Crossrunner was significantly the heaviest of the group.
