= Honda NT1100 =

NT1100
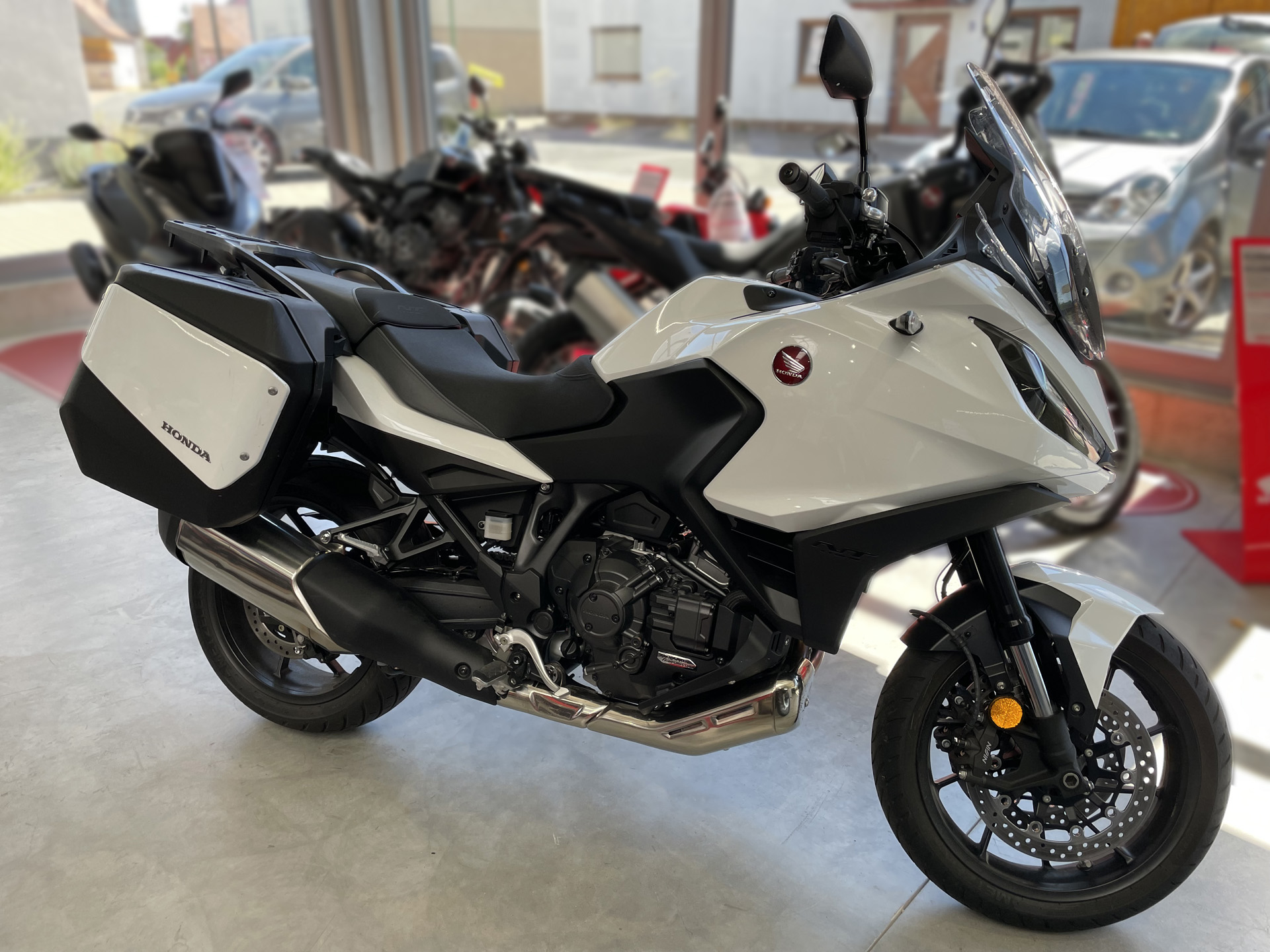
- Manufacturer: Honda
- Production: 2021–present
- Predecessor: Honda NT700V Deauville; Honda VFR1200F
- Class: Sport touring
- Engine: 1,084 cc (66.1 cu in) liquid-cooled 4-stroke 8-valve DOHC straight-twin engine
- Bore / stroke: 92.0 mm × 81.5 mm (3.62 in × 3.21 in)
- Compression ratio: 10.5:1
- Top speed: 200km/h
- Power: 75 kW (101 hp) at 8,500 rpm
- Torque: 104 N⋅m (77 lb⋅ft) at 6,000 rpm
- Fuel delivery: PGM-FI Fuel Injection
- Transmission: 6-speed manual 6-speed dual-clutch
- Wheelbase: 1,535 mm (60.4 in)
- Dimensions: L: 2,240 mm (88 in); W: 865 mm (34.1 in); H: 1,360 mm (54 in)
- Seat height: 820mm
- Weight: 238 kg (525 lb) (wet)
- Fuel capacity: 20.4L
- Related: Honda CRF1100L Africa Twin
- Ground clearance: 175mm

The NT1100 is a sport touring motorcycle produced by the Japanese company Honda.

Technology features include Android Auto and Apple Carplay.

== History ==
Introduced in 2021, it is built primarily for the European, Canadian and American market.

== Specifications ==
The engine is slightly modified compared to the Honda CRF1100L Africa Twin. The NT1100 reaches a top speed of 200 km/h (120 mph).

=== Transmission ===
The NT1100 has a six-speed manual transmission, optionally available as a dual-clutch transmission (DCT) and weighs 10 kg (22 lb) more. Unlike the last NT model, the Honda NT700V Deauville, the engine power is not transmitted by a cardan shaft but by a chain to the rear wheel.

However, beginning in 2025 the NT1100 is available only with the Dual Clutch Transmission in the United States.

=== Fuel supply ===
The fuel tank holds 20.4 L (5.4 gallons) Based on the WMTC consumption of 5 liters/100 km specified by the manufacturer or test consumption (with dual-clutch transmission) up to 6 liters/100 km, this results in a range of around 330–400 km (210–250 mi). The NT1100 has a regulated catalytic converter for exhaust aftertreatment.

=== Chassis ===
The chassis is based on a tubular steel frame with a bolted aluminum rear, also similar to the CRF1100L Africa Twin.

== Variants ==
The Honda NT1100 Police is a police variant, which was released in December 2024, for police forces in North America with orders being available in May 2025.

It is also used by Japanese law enforcement, being used since March 2024 to replace their Honda CB1300Ps and Yamaha FJR1300Ps.
