= Ariel Ace =

Sports motorcycle

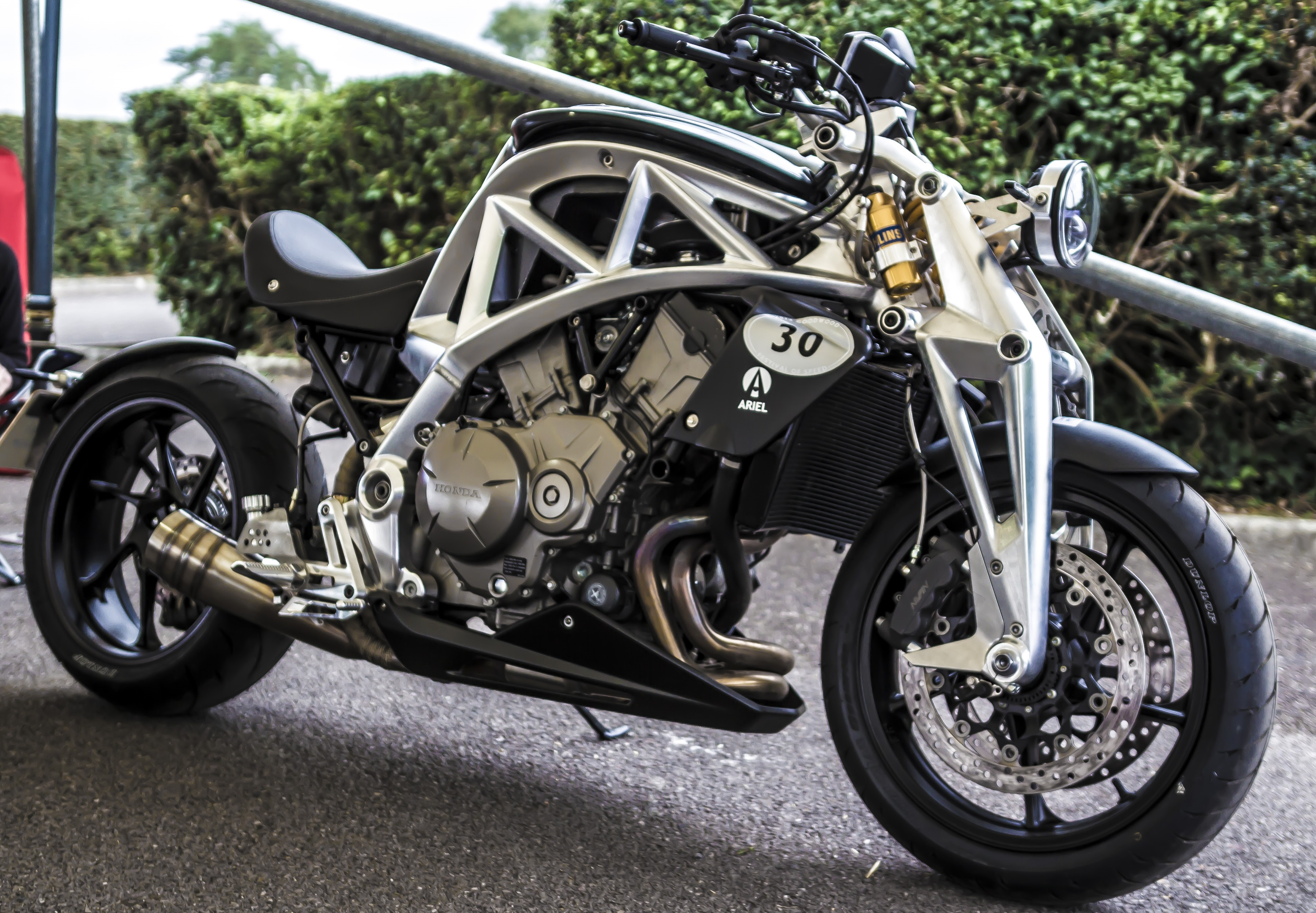
- Ariel Ace with girder fork
- Manufacturer: Ariel Motor Company
- Production: 2014–present
- Class: Naked bike
- Engine: Honda 1,237 cc (75.5 cu in), 4-valve liquid-cooled 76° V4 engine
- Bore / stroke: 81 mm × 60 mm (3.2 in × 2.4 in)
- Top speed: 170 mph (270 km/h) (estimated)
- Power: 173 hp (129 kW) (claimed)
- Torque: 95 lb⋅ft (129 N⋅m) (claimed)
- Transmission: 6-speed sequential manual, shaft-drive, dry-clutch, or 6-speed dual-clutch automatic
- Frame type: Aluminium trellis
- Suspension: Front: Girder fork or telescopic fork Rear: monoshock
- Brakes: Front: Dual disc, 6-pot Nissin caliper Rear: Single disc
- Tires: Front: 17 in (430 mm); Rear: 17 in (430 mm)
- Rake, trail: 21.8°–28.4° (adjustable)
- Wheelbase: 1,541–1,563 mm (60.7–61.5 in)
- Weight: 230 kg (510 lb) (wet)

The Ariel Ace is a 2014 sports motorcycle that is manufactured by the Ariel Motor Company in Crewkerne, Somerset, England. It uses the 1,200 cc (73 cu in) V4 engine from the Honda VFR1200.

It is the Ariel's first new motorcycle in more than 50 years.

== Design ==
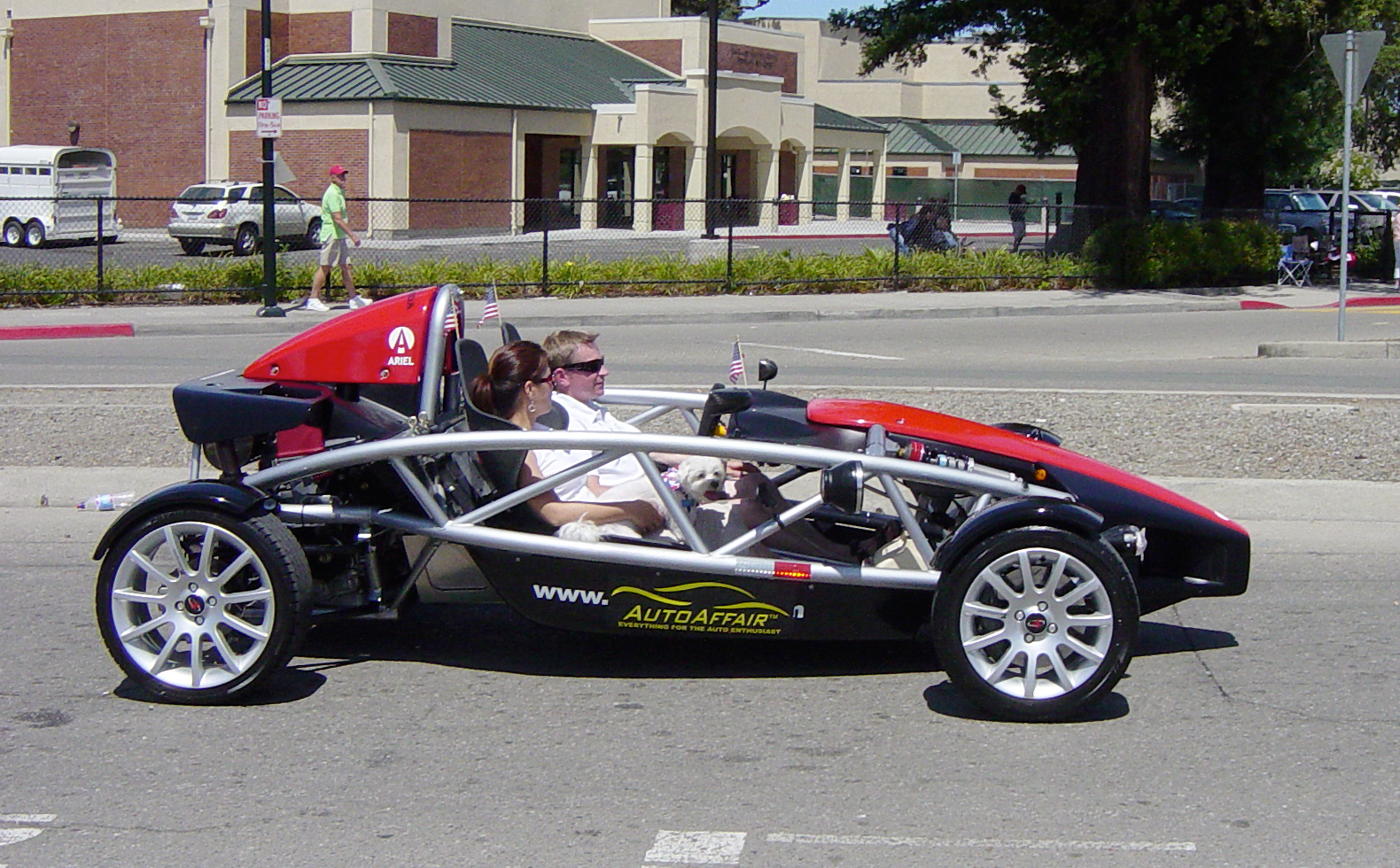
Ariel Ace shared the similar frame as the Ariel Atom, pictured here

Ariel has a "long-standing relationship with Honda", who were sufficiently impressed with Ariel's Atom sports car to allow them to use their VFR engine in the Ace. The V4 engine is suspended from "a huge, bridge-like aluminium frame" that resembles a trellis frame in appearance. Trellis frames are usually fabricated from welded tubes, such as on the Ducati Monster, as well as for the chassis of the Atom. The Ace's frame, however, is not made from welded steel tube; rather the frame sides are machined from a solid aluminium billet. This gives the frame's diagonal stiffeners their distinctive triangular vee section, rather than the usual round-section tube.

The Ariel Ace comes with a choice of two alternative front suspensions; either a conventional upside-down telescopic fork or Ariel's own girder fork. Rear suspension uses a single-sided swingarm. The final-drive is a shaft-drive.

An unusual feature is that the rider's knees do not grip a shaped fuel tank; instead, one's knees are alongside the frame, which is rather less comfortable.

=== Customization ===
Bikes can be ordered from the factory with various options, and upgraded over time. Options include front and rear suspension, handlebars, bodywork, fuel tank size, exhaust, wheels, seat, footrests, colors and finishes.

== Reception ==
Roland Brown, writing in The Daily Telegraph, concludes that the Ace is a "dramatically styled, cleverly engineered and enjoyably powerful V4 roadster that returns the renowned Ariel marque to motorcycling in impressive fashion". Jensen Beeler, writing in Asphalt and Rubber, dubbed it "the most expensive Honda you will ever come across" noting its exclusivity. Loz Blain in Gizmag called it "one of the best looking motorcycles I've ever seen", also noting the £20,000 price puts it out of reach for many riders.

Gizmag and Jalopnik both noted the unique customization options available to create a cruiser, fully faired sportbike, or naked bike around a common frame and powertrain; the latter publication called it an "adult Lego set".

A review in Road & Track compared the design to that of the Atom sports car, calling it "purposeful" but "not particularly pretty".

== See also ==
- List of Ariel motorcycles
