= Ariel Motor Company =

English motor vehicle company

Ariel Motor Company Limited
- Formerly: Ariel Manufacturing Limited (1–30 October 2008)
- Type: Ltd
- Industry: Automotive
- Founded: 1991 (as Solocrest Ltd.)
- Founder: Simon Saunders
- Headquarters: Crewkerne, Somerset, United Kingdom
- Area served: Worldwide
- Products: Cars; Motorcycles
- Number of employees: 30
- Website: arielmotor.co.uk

Ariel Motor Company Limited is an English low-volume performance motor vehicle manufacturing company based in Crewkerne of Somerset, England.

== History ==
The company was founded by Simon Saunders in 1991 as Solocrest Ltd. with a concept of modernizing the Lotus Seven. As a transport design lecturer, Saunders and his student Niki Smart created CAD designs. After several sports car companies rejected his proposal, Saunders founded own company to create the Atom.

In 1999, the company name was changed to Ariel Motor Company Ltd. The original Ariel Motors remains as the trading company of the Ariel Owners Motorcycle Club (AOMCC) Ariel Motorcycles firm. Ariel Motor Company is one of the UK's smallest automotive companies, with just 30 employees, producing up to 100 cars per year.

== Products ==
=== Atom ===
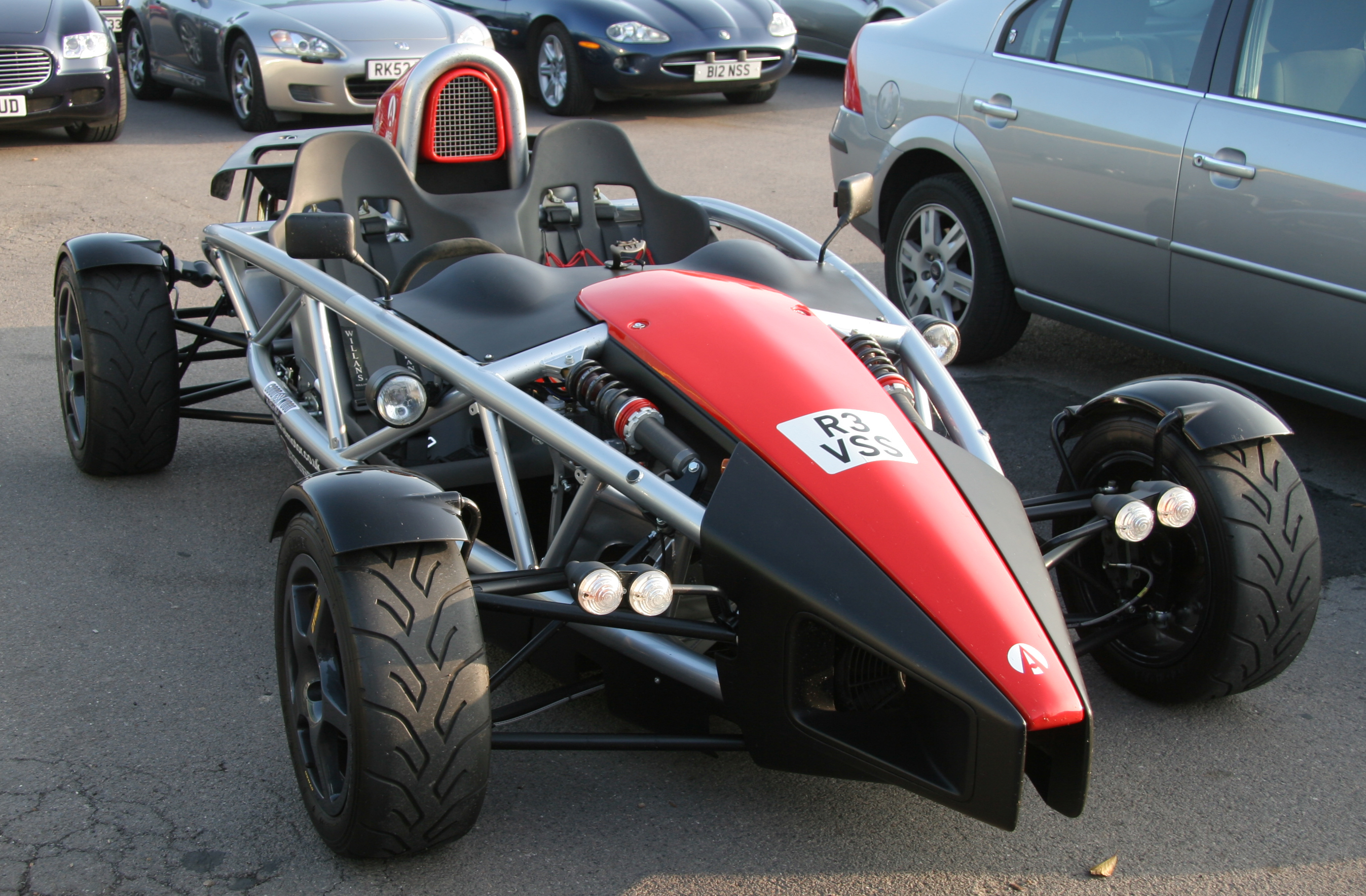
Ariel Atom at Goodwood

The company manufactures the Ariel Atom, an extremely light, high performance car, powered by a Honda Civic Type-R engine and gearbox. The Atom is the world's first road-going exoskeletal car; it has no bodywork or roof, and is built entirely around the tube chassis, making it weigh less than 500 kg (1,102 lb). This means that the Ariel Atom 3.5R supercharged model has a power-to-weight ratio of around 700 bhp (520 kW) per tonne.

In 2003, the 2-liter Honda Civic Type R (for the 220) and Type-S (for the 160) engine was used to power the Atom 2. Introduced in 2007, the Atom 3 included a new gearbox and a "KZ" Type-R motor. In July 2018, at the Goodwood Festival of Speed Ariel announced and started taking reservations for their new Ariel Atom 4. The new car is completely revised from the previous Ariel Atom, with all but a few parts having been changed. The new car is powered again by the engine used in the Honda Civic Type R, but is now turbo charged as standard in the Atom 4. The new car also features a thicker frame, separate seats and a revised intake. The new car has been reviewed by Autocar and deliveries started at the start of June 2019. In 2020, Autocar selected the Ariel Atom 4 as Britain's Best Driver's Car.

=== Ace ===
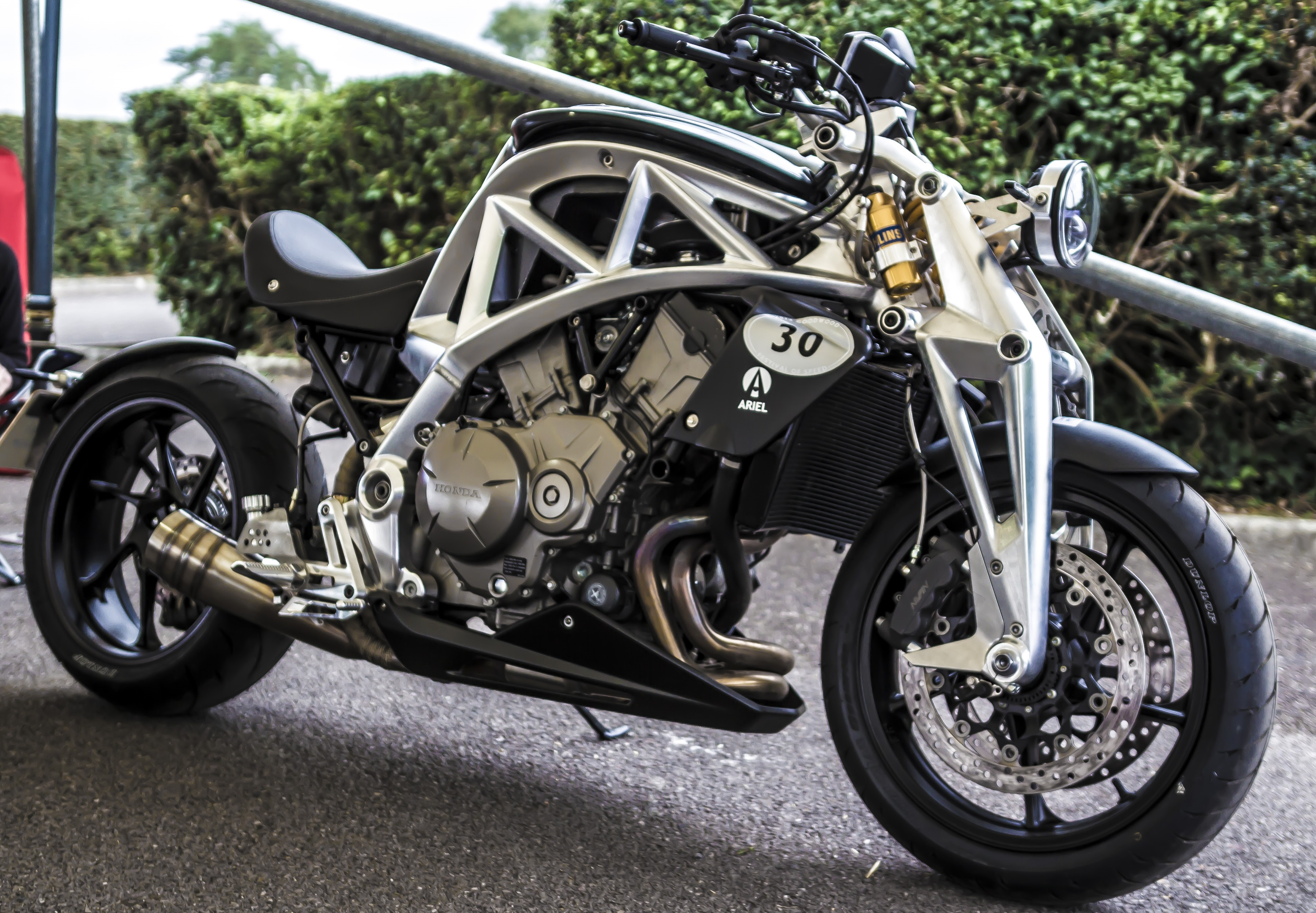
Ariel Ace motorcycle

In June 2014, the company announced the new Ariel Ace motorcycle. Powered by a Honda 1237cc V4 engine and gearbox, the bike will be produced from 2015 in similar volume levels to the existing car-based products.

=== Nomad ===
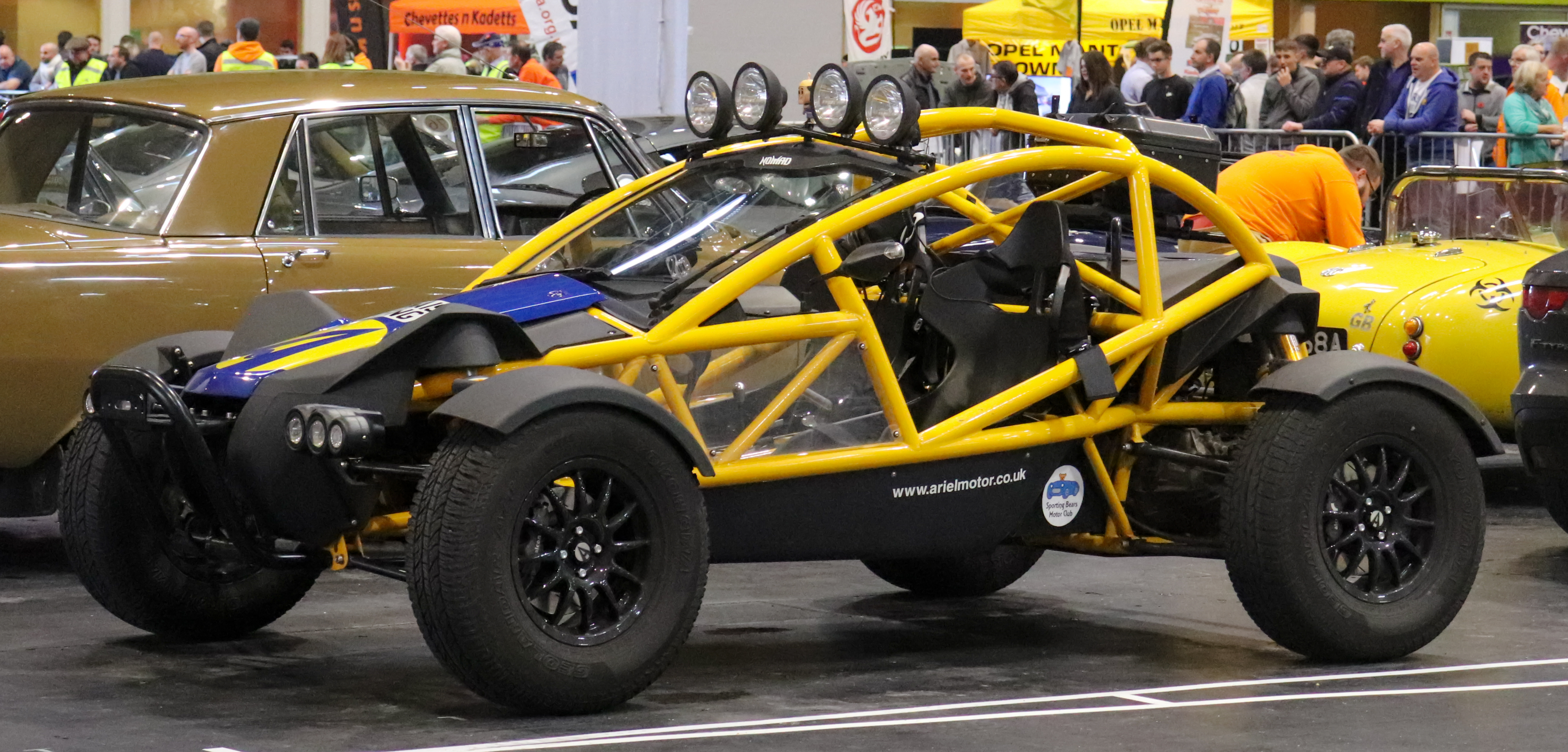
2019 Ariel Nomad 2.4 Front.

In January 2015, Ariel introduced the Nomad, a road-legal buggy designed along the same principles as the Atom, at the Autosport International Show. The Nomad utilises a 2.4 litre Honda engine producing 235bhp.

In 2023, Ariel received $370,000 funding from the Niche Vehicle Network (NVN) and the Advanced Propulsion Centre (APC) to construct Nomad EV.

=== HIPERCAR ===
In August 2017, Ariel announced the HIPERCAR (High Performance Carbon Reduction), an electric sports car. The HIPERCAR uses Equipmake APM200 electric motors, supplied by a Norfolk-based electric bus manufacturing start-up.

== See also ==
- List of car manufacturers of the United Kingdom
