= Combined braking system =

System for linking front and rear brakes on a motorcycle or scooter

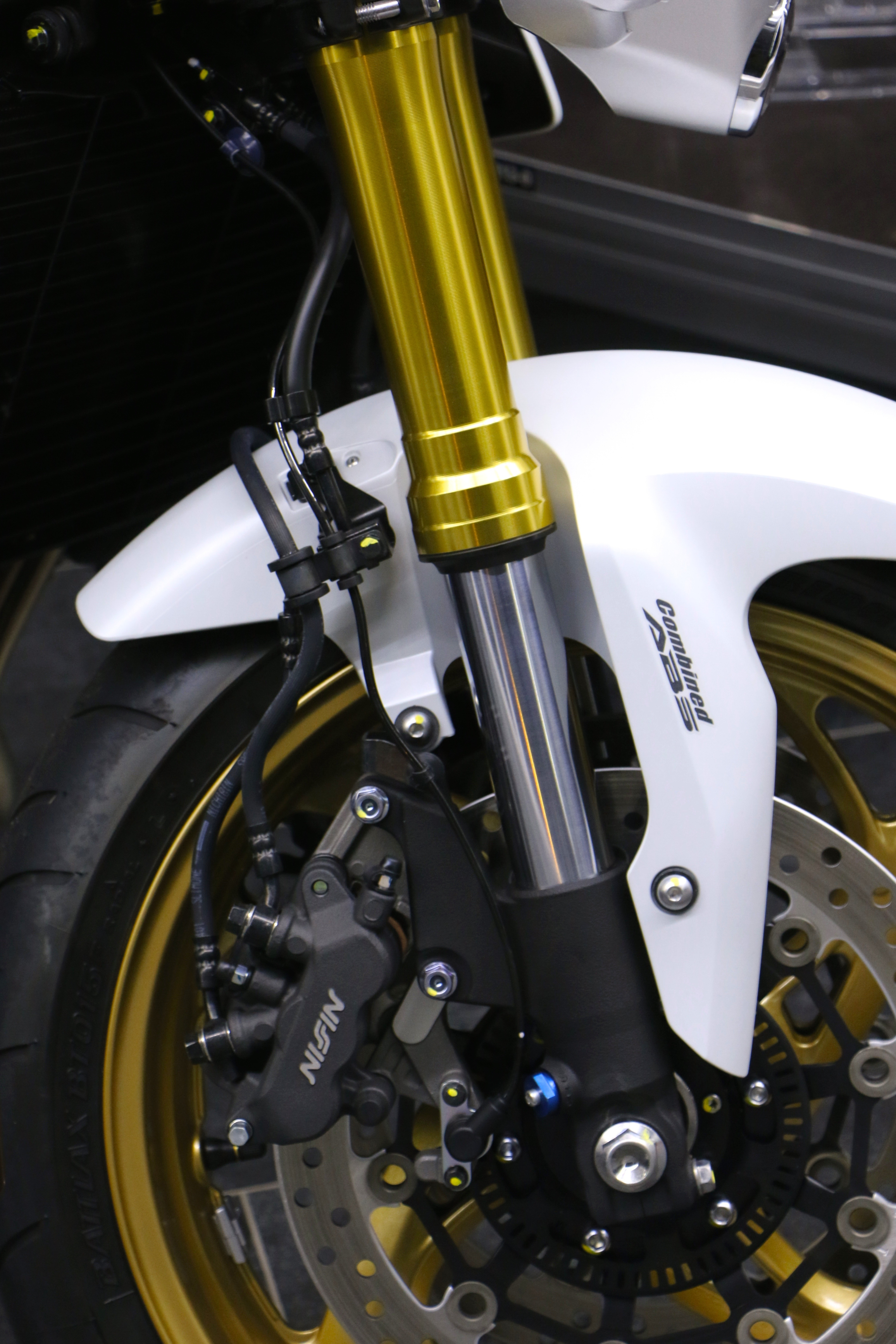
Two braking pipes of CBS connected to the Disc brake assembly

A combined braking system (CBS), also called linked braking system (LBS), is a system for linking front and rear brakes on a motorcycle or scooter. In this system, the rider's action of depressing one of the brake levers applies both front and rear brakes. The amount of each brake applied may be determined by a proportional control valve. This is distinct from (conventional) integrated brakes, where applying pressure to the rear brake pedal only applies some braking force to the front brake.

== Legal status ==
In the United States, the law requires a motorcycle to have two separate braking systems, although there is no special requirement that the systems have separate controls. By contrast, a car is required to have only one braking system for dynamic braking (i.e. braking when moving), plus a separate parking brake.

Since 2016, the EU requires CBS or anti-lock braking system (ABS) on all new scooters, motorcycles, tricycles, and quads below 125 cc.

Since 1 April 2019, India requires CBS (or ABS) on all new two-wheelers below 125 cc.

From 1 January 2024, Argentina will require CBS (or front wheel ABS) on all new on-road motorcycles between 50 and 250cc (or electric equivalents).

Chile will require CBS (or ABS) on all new motorcycles from 50 cc to 149 cc or 4 kW to 11 kW from February 2026.

From October 2025, Colombia will require CBS (or ABS) from 50 cc to 149 cc or 4 kW to 11 kW.

From March 2027, Colombia will require CBS (or ABS) on all new motorcycles below 125 cc.

== Examples of CBS ==
BMW Motorrad uses a system called Integral ABS, in which the front brake lever operates both the front and rear brakes, while the brake pedal operates only the rear brake. In the inverse, Honda's system that features both combined brakes and anti-lock brakes is dubbed Combined ABS. In this system, the rear brake pedal operates both front and rear brake, and the front brake lever operates the front calipers, which in turn activates a secondary master cylinder to engage the rear brake. ABS modulators are installed on both the front and rear wheel.

Honda's first street motorcycle with a combined braking system (then called Unified Braking) was the 1983 GL1100. This system was derived from a 1970s RCB1000 world endurance race bike. Honda made several variations of the LBS system with differing levels of complexity and integration. The Honda CBR1000F and CBR1100XX and VFR800 featured what Honda called LBS II (now called Dual CBS), a system where both levers would activate both brakes through a system of secondary pistons and proportioning/delay valves. One front brake caliper was connected to a secondary master cylinder, and the caliper was allowed to rotate slightly to apply pressure to the piston in that secondary master cylinder. Braking force was translated into pressure that was sent to the rear brake cylinder. Only the two outer pistons in the front brake calipers were directly activated by the brake lever; the center piston received pressure from the rear pedal via the proportioning and delay valve.

From 2009 the Honda CBR1000RR and CBR600RR sport bikes are optionally equipped with an integrated Dual CBS and ABS system which uses an electronic control unit to distribute hydraulic pressure between front and rear brakes. The combined anti-lock braking system is called C-ABS.

== See also ==
- SureStop - a similar system designed for bicycles
