= V45 =

V45 may refer to:

- Honda V45 Magna, a cruiser motorcycle
- Honda V45 Sabre, a standard motorcycle
- KSHV-TV, a television station in Shreveport, Louisiana
- SMS V45, a torpedo boat of the German Imperial Navy
- Vanadium-45, an isotope of vanadium
