= Honda Interceptor VF750F =

Motorcycle; V45, RC15

Interceptor VF750F V45
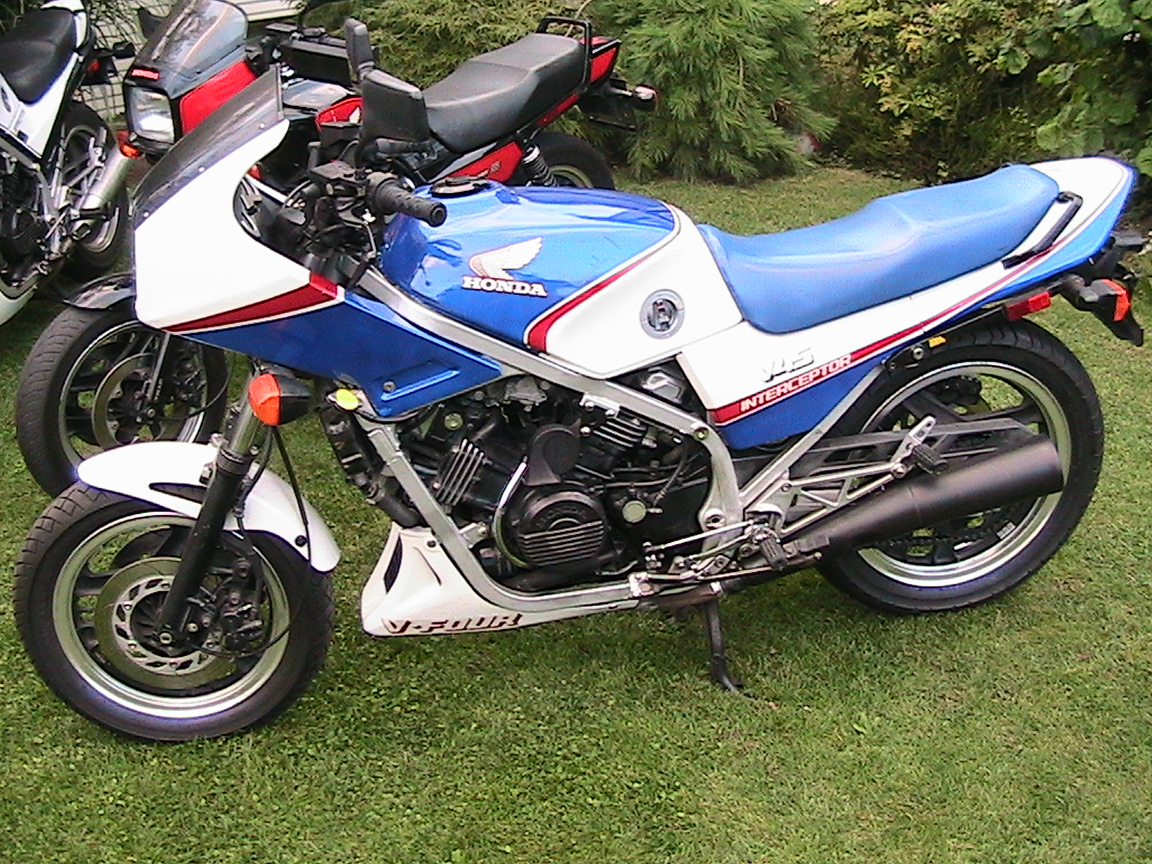
- 1983 Honda Interceptor VF750F
- Manufacturer: Honda
- Also called: Interceptor
- Production: 1983–1985
- Predecessor: Magna VF750C and Sabre VF750S
- Successor: VFR750F
- Engine: 748 cc (45.6 cu in) liquid-cooled four-stroke, 90° V4, DOHC, 4 valves per cylinder, carburated
- Bore / stroke: 70 mm × 48.6 mm (2.76 in × 1.91 in)
- Compression ratio: 10.5:1
- Top speed: 138 mph (222 km/h)
- Power: 86–89 hp (64–66 kW) @ 10000 rpm
- Torque: 46.3 ft.lb. @ 7500 rpm
- Transmission: 5-speed manual, chain final drive
- Brakes: Front: dual 270 mm disc Rear: single 288 mm disc
- Weight: 550 lb (250 kg) (wet)
- Fuel capacity: 23 L (5.1 imp gal; 6.1 US gal)
- Fuel consumption: 37.3 mpg

The VF750F V45 Interceptor aka RC15 (Honda's internal racing code) is a street and sports motorcycle designed and produced by Honda from 1983 to 1985. It has an 86 hp (64 kW), liquid-cooled, four-stroke, V4 engine with dual overhead cams (DOHC) in a perimeter frame made of steel, and has half fairing. The V4s were started a year before with the 1982 Magna VF750C and Sabre VF750S but were adapted for the VF750F in 1983 by reducing the six speed transmission to a five speed because of the change from shaft drive to chain. This reduced the available space in the transmission thus changing to a five speed.

New American Motorcyclist Association (AMA) super bike class regulations required that four-cylinder bikes be downsized from 1000cc to 750cc, and the bikes had to be production based. This regulation created the first Japanese "Repli-Racer", the 1983 Honda Interceptor VF750F, designed for Honda's AMA VF750F super bike. Honda didn't cut corners when making the Interceptor and made it as close to the super bike as possible without losing its street legality.

== New Technology ==
The Honda Interceptor introduced technology to the street that was previously only seen on the race track. The bike debuted to the press in late 1982 and was available for sale to the public in 1983. The 1983 Honda Interceptor was given high praise by industry sources: "The handling is a treat, the power more than adequate and the appearance, the Interceptor's primary thrust, spells out its job: To boldly go where only race bikes have gone before.". “On tight, twisty mountain roads the Honda does everything you ask of it; flick it from side to side, up hills or down, with the brakes on or off, and it responds willingly, instantly and precisely. The Interceptor's front bank was moved from the Magna's 23.5 degrees to 30 degrees to tuck the Comstar 16-inch front wheel closer to the engine which improved the handling now that the bike had a 58.9 inch wheelbase. The front and rear wheels were controlled by fully adjustable Showa suspension. The front suspension was equipped with 39mm forks with the TRAC (Torque Reactive Anti-dive Control) anti-dive system to stabilize the ride on the track and on the road. The rear suspension used a sand cast swing-arm. The 748 cc (45.6 cu in) engine had an 8 hp (6.0 kW) boost from the Magna's V4 because of a newly designed air-box which forced cold air onto the cylinder heads. Along with the air-box, the engine was liquid-cooled with two radiators. The Interceptor was equipped with a "Slipper Clutch" which made the clutch slip on hard braking to stop the rear tire from bouncing. This was the first time a street bike had ever had a slipper clutch. The engine was attached to the bike via a steel perimeter frame with a disconnectable section allowing the engine to be removed.

== Style ==
The Interceptor sported racing bike fairings that shaped the future for modern sport bikes. The tank was 5.8 gal and was shaped to keep the rider's legs tucked in to eliminate air drag. The new front fairing replaced the cafe racer headlight with an aerodynamic fiberglass fairing to push the air over the rider's helmet. The lower cowl produced downforce to push the 551 lb bike to the road. The front wheel fairing was designed to eliminate debris from striking the bike and causing damage. The 32.3” seat-height provided comfort for a long trip without sacrificing the track bike stance.

== Accessories ==
In 1983 Honda offered a variety of accessories for the Interceptor. In 1983, a rear seat cowl with matching paint scheme was available to make the bike a closer replica of the single seated race bikes. The seat cowl had a storage compartment for small items and was lockable as well. Another optional extra were the engine crash bars which went from the bottom of the top radiator and followed the frame down the foot pegs. This provided protection to the engine in the case of an accident. Honda also offered a luggage rack and a bike cover.

== Engine Issues ==
The Interceptor had one endemic engine issue in the V4, camshaft wear. In 1984, camshaft issues started to arise and owners started to complain. At first Honda did not admit that there was a problem but after conducting further research, they decided that the camshaft wear was most likely caused by oil flow issues. Valve clearance issues were also suggested as a possible contributory factor. Honda issued a recall on the bikes and added kink-free oil lines and less restrictive banjo bolts. They also made alterations by drilling holes in the cam lobes and capping off the hollow cam's ends. This did not fix the problem, so Honda went back to the drawing board. The first thought was that the issue was heat related, but after further investigation the real problem was discovered - there was too much clearance in the camshaft bearings. Honda fixed this by changing all the camshafts with new components. This fixed the camshaft issues but the reputation of the Honda V4 was already damaged.

== Racing history ==
The bike won the Castrol Six Hour race in 1983. The RC15 also won the AMA Superbike Championship for two years straight, 1984 and 1985 with Fred Merkel, who won also the following year 1986 aboard the RC24, Honda VFR750F, Interceptor's direct successor.
