= Honda VF500 =

Motorcycle engine

The VF500 is the Honda Motorcycle designation for its 1984-1986 498cc V-four motorcycle engine. It was used in two motorcycles, the VF500F Interceptor and the VF500C Magna V30.

== Specification ==
- Type: 498 cc, liquid-cooled, V4, 4 stroke
- Bore: 60.4 mm
- Stroke: 44 mm
- Valves: 4 per cylinder
- Power: 70 hp (52.2 kW) at 12,000 rpm
- Torque: 31.7 ft lb (43 Nm) at 10,500 rpm
