= Honda Interceptor =

Honda Interceptor may refer to any of the following models of Honda motorcycle:

| Model | Start year | End year |
|---|---|---|
| VF | 1982 | |
| VFR | 1986 | |
| VF1000 | 1984 | 1988 |
| VFR800 | 1998 | 2021 |
| VTR250 | 1988 | 1990 |
| VTR250 | 1997 | 2018 |
| VFR750F | 1986 | 1997 |
| VF750F | 1983 | 1985 |
| VF500F | 1984 | 1986 |
| VF700F | | |
