= Suzuki Madura =

- Manufacturer: Suzuki
- Production: 1985–1986
- Class: Cruiser (motorcycle)
- Engine: 1,165 cc (71.1 cu in) liquid-cooled DOHC 16 valve 4-stroke, 82° V-4
- Transmission: Wet, multi-plate clutch, shaft drive.
- Suspension: Front: 41mm Kayaba; Rear: Suzuki full-floater, single Kayaba damper
- Brakes: Front: Dual single-action calipers - 268mm discs Rear: Single double-action caliper - 168mm disc
- Tires: Front: 110/80-19; Rear: 140/80-16
- Rake, trail: 29.3° / 110 mm (4.5 in)
- Wheelbase: 1,575 mm (62.0 in)
- Seat height: 781 mm (30.7 in)
- Fuel capacity: 13 L (2.9 imp gal; 3.4 US gal)
- Related: Suzuki Boulevard M50

The Suzuki Madura was a cruiser motorcycle sold by Suzuki in 1985 and 1986. It was available with either 1200 cc or 700 cc V4 engines. It was created as a response to Honda's Magna V4 muscle cruiser and was a direct competitor with Yamaha's V-Max power cruiser, also released in 1985.

== Model designations ==
- GV1200GL
- GV1200GLF
- GV1200GLG
- GV700GL

== History ==
In response to the Honda Magna, Suzuki made the Madura model. Like the Magna, it was a V-four powered cruiser. Like the Magna, the Madura was offered with two different engine sizes. Both bikes' smaller engines displaced 700 cc, but while the larger V65 Magna displaced 1100 cc (actual 1098 cc), the big Madura displaced 1200 cc (actual 1165 cc).

Production of the Madura was halted after just two years. According to Peter Seifert of Vernon, B.C., Canada, 5099 Maduras were produced.

== Features ==
The Madura had a V-four engine with hydraulic lifters. The lifters reduced maintenance, and avoided the kind of cam-wear problems that plagued all but the 500cc versions in the Magna line. Despite displacing 100cc more, the Madura didn't have more power or torque than the V65 Magna. The Madura 1200 was factory rated at 117 hp, while the V65 Magna was rated at 116 hp. Actual power in a road-tested bike was found to be about 89 horsepower (66 kW). For comparison, a same year V65 put down 93 hp, and the 1985-2007 Vmax (1198cc)rated at 145HP would usually dyno 110-116HP at the rear wheel with just a 5-speed transmission.

In addition to the maintenance-free lifters, the Madura had a self-adjusting hydraulically actuated clutch, and a low-maintenance, shaft final drive. The rear suspension was a sophisticated monoshock arrangement that used a single rear swingarm tube to carry the driveshaft as well.

Ergonomically, the Madura featured a low, scooped seat, swept-back handle-bars, and foot-controls that wouldn't be considered "forward" by later standards, but at the time were noted for being 14" ahead of the center of the seat.

== Speed ==
According to Cycle magazine, the 1200 cc Madura completed the 1/4-mile in 11.753 seconds at 115.08 mph. For comparison, on the same day the V65 Magna ran 11.86 at 115.86 mph

Cycle Guide recorded an 11.36 at 117.18 1/4 mile. while their Magna clocked 11.44 at 118.42

Motorcyclist clocked a corrected 11.47 at 117.6 with the GV1200 Madura.

Cycle World magazine reported the 700 cc Madura doing the 1/4-mile in 12.89 seconds at 102.68 mph.
