= Honda VF500F =

Displacement sport motorcycle

Honda VF500
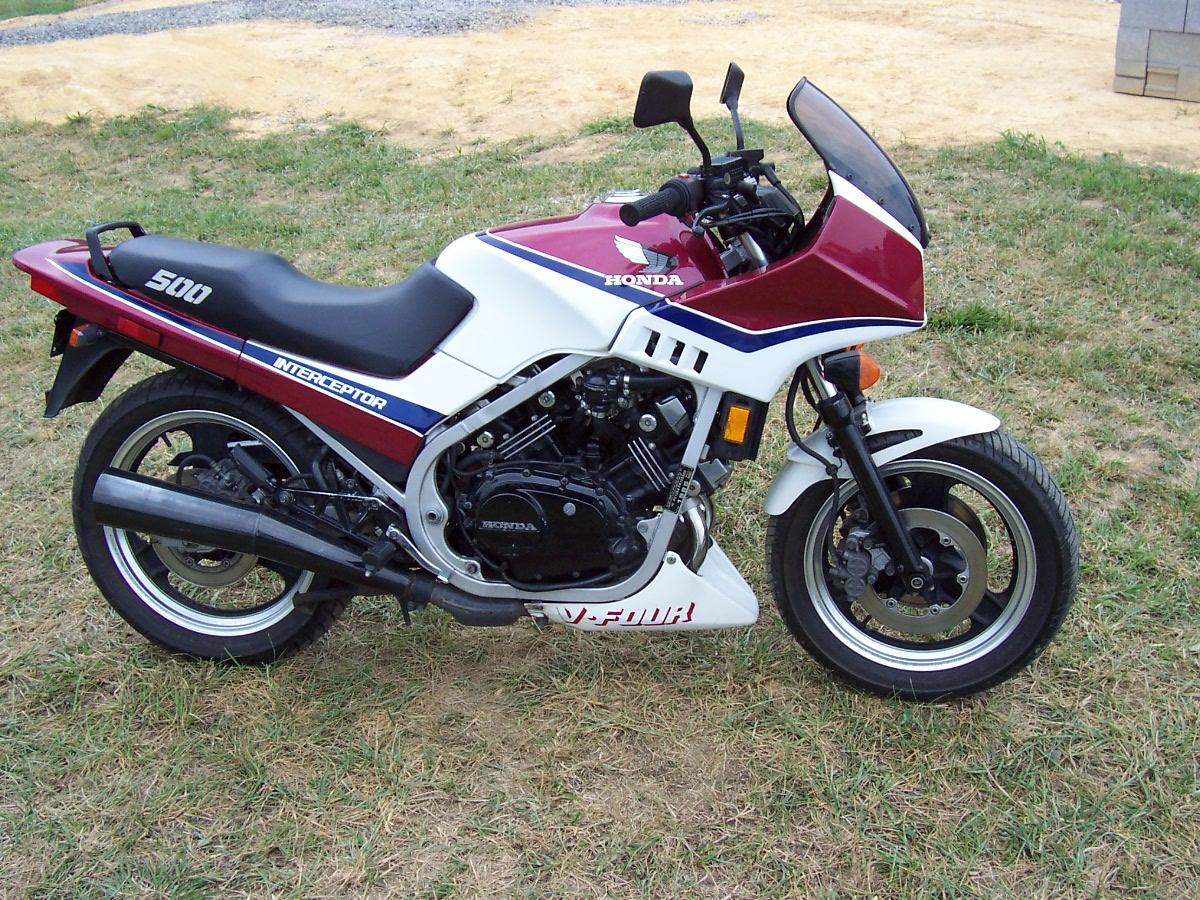
- Manufacturer: Honda
- Also called: Interceptor
- Production: 1984–1986
- Predecessor: None
- Successor: CBR600F "Hurricane"
- Class: Sport bike
- Engine: 498 cc (30.4 cu in) liquid-cooled 4-stroke, 16-valve, mechanical adjustable rocker arms DOHC V4 90°
- Bore / stroke: 60.0 mm × 44.0 mm (2.36 in × 1.73 in)
- Power: 68 HP @ 11,500 rpm
- Torque: 4.2 kg*m (30.4 lb-ft) @ 10,500 rpm
- Transmission: 6-speed manual chain drive
- Suspension: F: Female slider telescopic forks 37mm R: single mono-spring/damper swingarm, 4 position adjustable rebound, air pressure preload
- Brakes: F: (two) solid disc 255mm diameter 2 piston sliding caliper R: solid disc 255mm 2 piston sliding caliper
- Tires: F: 100/90-16; R: 110/90-18
- Rake, trail: 27 degree, 4 in (100 mm)
- Wheelbase: 1,420 mm (56 in)
- Weight: 184 kg (406 lb) (dry); 201 kg (443 lb) (wet)
- Fuel capacity: 22 L (4.8 imp gal; 5.8 US gal)

The Honda VF500F (badged as "Interceptor" for the US and Canada market) is a 498 cc (30.4 cu in) displacement sport motorcycle manufactured from 1984 to 1986. It is widely regarded as one of the finest handling motorcycles of the 1980s.

It was part of Honda's family of first generation V4 engine motorcycles (Interceptor - VF400F VF500F VF700F VF750F VF1000F). The VF500F was derived from the Japanese market VF400F (400 cc engine). It is not simply an overbored and/or overstroked version of the VF400F.

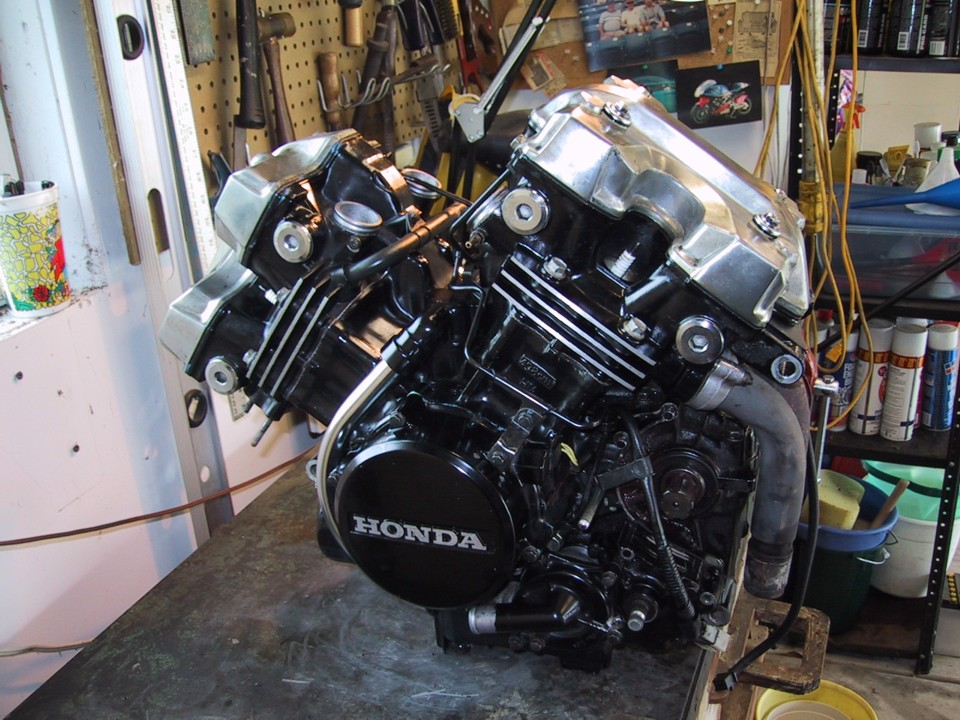
VF500F V4 motor

The engine as well as the cycle are entirely specific, with very few common parts. The Honda VF500 engine was also used almost entirely unchanged in the Magna V30 standard motorcycle during the same years.

The VF500F was produced for the North American and European markets. The European market version also had a VF500F2 model which utilized a full fairing, whereas the VF500F had an upper half fairing with a lower cowl in front of the oilpan.

The VF500F utilized a skeleton square tubular steel frame with conventional forks and a rear mono-spring/damper, both adjustable in stiffness with air pressure. In the rear a cast aluminum swingarm is used. It used a 16-inch front wheel with a 100/90-16 tire for reduced rotational inertia to make steering easier. The rear wheel is 18-inch with a 110/90-18 tire.

It was replaced by the CBR600F "Hurricane" motorcycle in 1987.
