= Honda Sabre =

Motorcycle made by Honda from 1982 to 1985

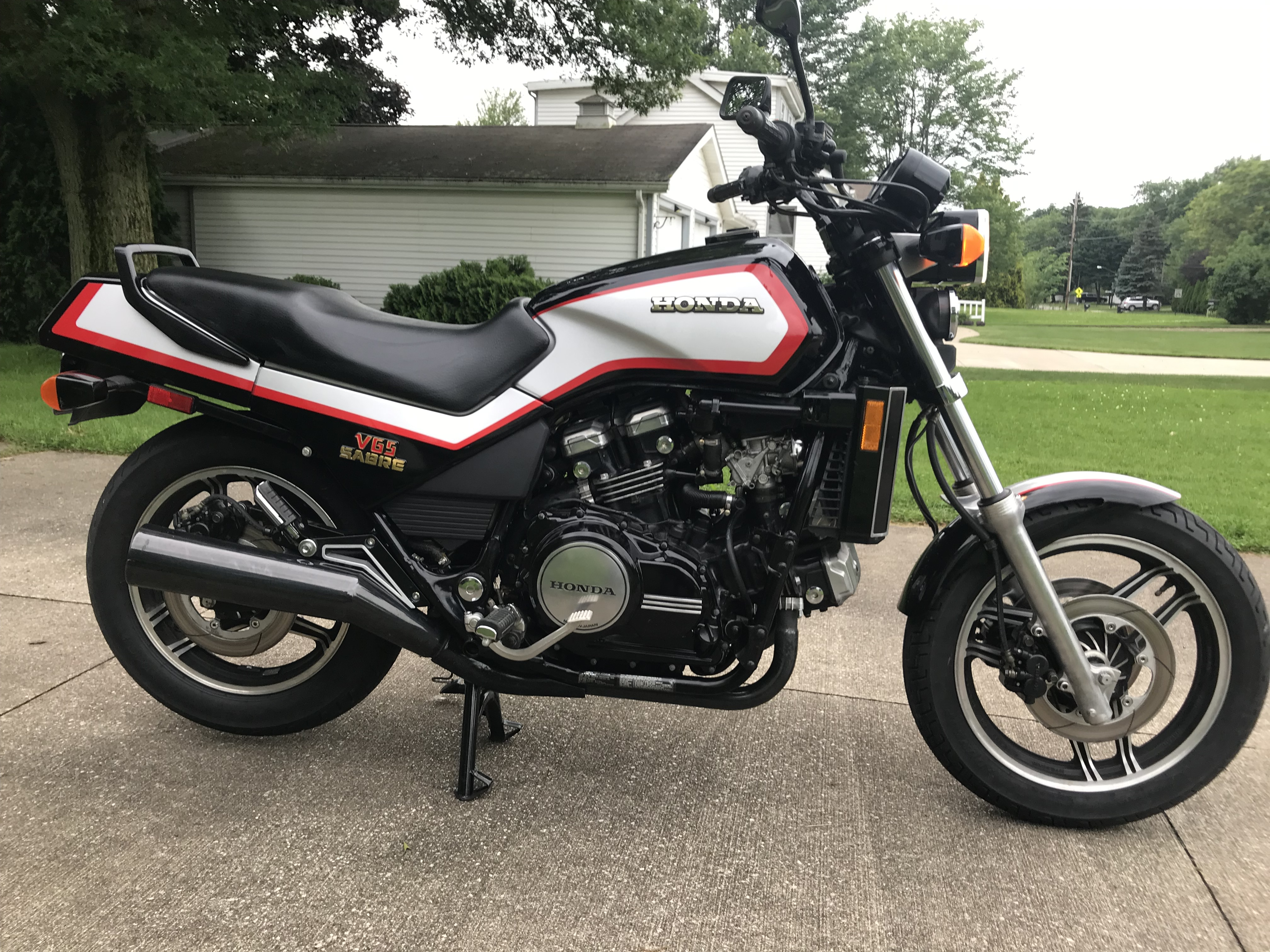
Honda V65 Sabre

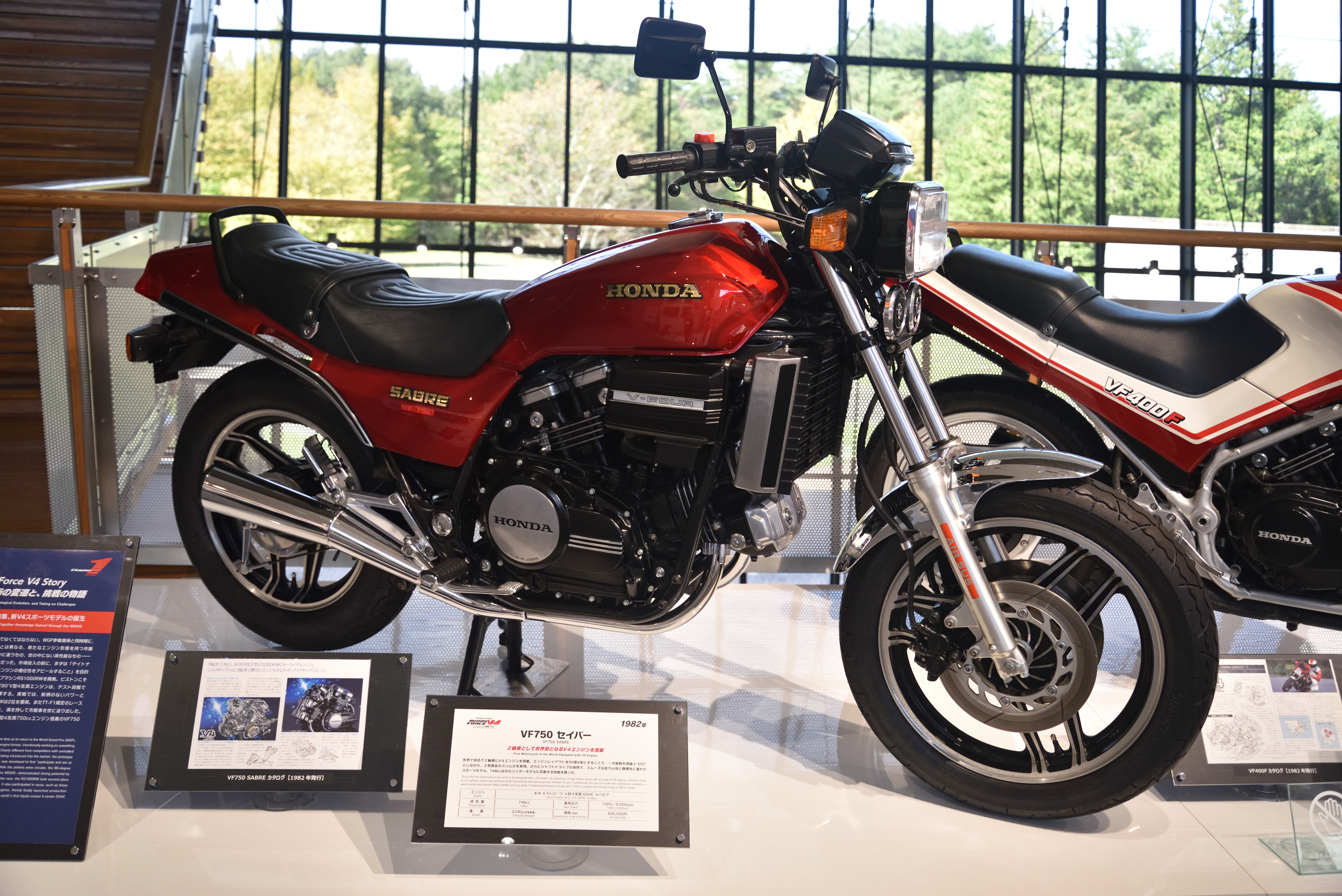
Honda VF750S

The Honda Sabre was a standard V4 engine motorcycle made by Honda from 1982 to 1985.

Sabre models and their marketing names were:

- VF750S – V45 Sabre (1982–1983)
- VF700S – 700 Sabre (1984-1985)
- VF1100S – V65 Sabre (1984–1985)

== V4 engine ==
The V45 Sabre was introduced in 1982. It shared its V4 engine design with the Magna and Interceptor. The engines in the Sabre and Magna were so similar to be almost completely interchangeable except for a few fuel and carburetion-related differences. The Interceptor engine was angled differently in the frame and had a chain drive instead of shaft, but shared the same 90-degree-V four-cylinder, DOHC configuration.

The V4 engine combined the high-revving power of an in-line four-cylinder with the narrow width of a v-twin. The 90-degree angle of the V also gave the engine perfect primary balance, which helped avoid the vibration problems that plagued many in-line four-cylinder motorcycle engines without the need of heavy solid rubber mounts or counter-balancers.

In 1984 import tariffs were changed, causing the V45 engine to be modified. Honda reduced the displacement to 698 cc by destroking the motor from 48.6 mm to 45.4 mm, added a tooth on the clutch gear to compensate for a loss of torque and changed the model name to VF700S. The VF700S models continued for only one more year.

The 750 cc V45 engine produced 82 hp (61 kW) for 1982 models. 86 hp (64 kW) for 1983–1985 models. 76 hp (57 kW) for 700 models. The 1,100 cc "V65" engine, which was introduced in 1983, produced 121 hp (90 kW). Both were slightly detuned throughout the run of the first generation engine to cope with customs and EPA regulations. However, Honda reported the same horsepower figures throughout the whole generation even though the actual dyno-proven, detuned, figures showed up lower than advertised.

The engine's downfall was premature camshaft wear in some early models in both the V45 and V65. In retrospect, the wear was caused by inadequate oil flow to the heads/cams, driving for a long time on low engine speeds (under 3,000 rpm) and at cold start /engine warm-up procedure, non-accurate valve adjustment, and insufficient maintenance. Honda itself at first denied there was a problem, then blamed inadequate or incorrect maintenance for the problem. They changed the maintenance interval, and developed and sold a special tool for 'proper' valve-lash adjustment. They eventually made changes to the design and production methods of the engine which eliminated the problem. But this came too late to save the engine's reputation. The first generation V4 was discredited, and the first V4 revolution failed. While Yamaha (the V-Max) and Suzuki (the Madura) had both responded to the Hondas with V4 engines of their own. Eventually, Suzuki dropped the Madura, and the production of the Yamaha V-Max was continued for over 20 years.

== Tariffs ==
Two years of the Sabre production run were part of a group of Japanese motorcycles that came to be known as "tariff-busters". The 1984 and 1985 models fell in this class because of the modifications made allowing those models to circumvent the newly passed United States International Trade Commission tariff that placed a heavy tax on import/foreign motorcycles with 700cc or larger engine displacement.

== Technology ==
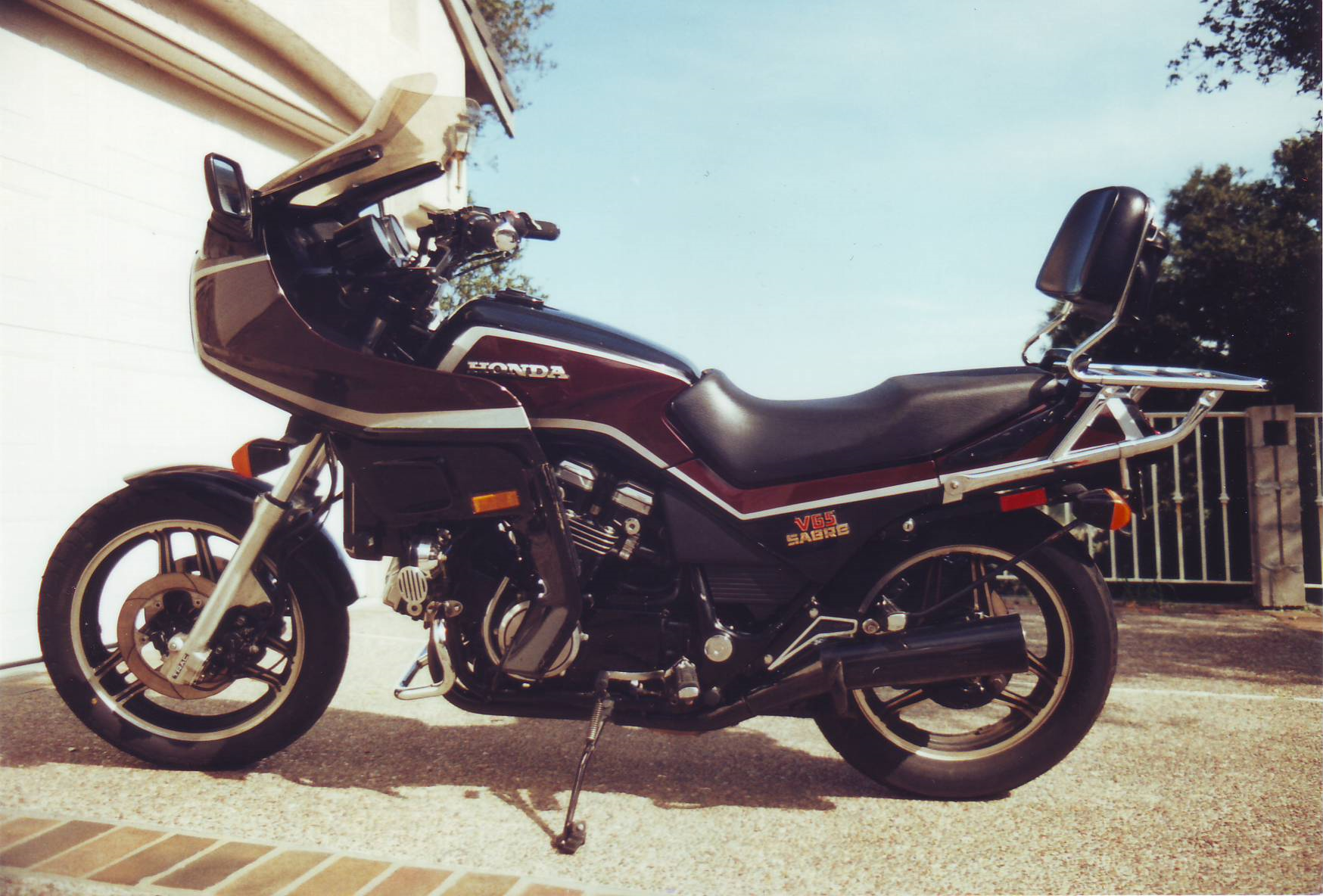
1984 Honda Sabre V65 with full Hondaline fairing, engine guard and backrest rack options. The only visible after market items are the foam hand grips and chrome horn.

The Sabres, especially the V45, were technology showcases for Honda. Not only did they feature revolutionary water-cooled, DOHC, 90-degree-V four-cylinder engines, but they also featured hydraulically actuated, one-way clutches, TRAC anti-dive front suspension, Pro-link rear suspensions, and electronic speedometers and tachometers.

The original V45 came with a fibre-optic anti-theft system, self-canceling turn signals, built-in lap timer, and an electronic instrument cluster that included an LCD gear indicator that doubled as an electrical fault display.

Many of these electronic features were dropped from later V45s, and the VF700, though most of the mechanical features remained.

== Brethren ==
Honda introduced the V4 engine in three motorcycles, representing the three types of street bikes. The Interceptor was a sportbike, the Magna was a cruiser, and the Sabre a standard. Both the Interceptor and Magna continued in production for decades after the Sabre was discontinued.

== Speed ==
In 1984, Cycle magazine reported that they achieved a 0–60 mph time of 3.04 seconds and an 11.2 second, 121.69 miles per hour (195.84 km/h) quarter-mile run with a Sabre V65.

== V-twin Sabre ==
In 2010, Honda resurrected the Sabre name as a sister bike to their new VT1300CX Fury; a V-twin, chopper-inspired cruiser. This new Sabre VT1300CS sported a larger 4.4 gallon fuel tank (a full gallon more than the Fury), tank-mounted speedometer, five spoke muscle-cruiser styled sheels and a longer, lower appearance (when compared to the high-necked, chopper-styled Fury). Among the Sabre and Fury were two other sister bikes: the Stateline VT1300CR, which further moved away from the Fury design by adding larger, more highway friendly front rubber, more pullback on the handle bars and classic, cruiser styled fenders; and the Interstate VT1300CT, which took the changes from both the Sabre and Stateline, and then adds more pullback on a narrower set of handle bars, floorboards in lieu of sportier foot pegs, hard saddlebags and a large touring style windscreen.

Despite sharing a name with the older Sabre model, the 2010+ V-twin model shares nothing in terms of parts, style or design with the earlier V4-powered models.

== See also ==
- Honda VF and VFR
- Honda Magna
- Honda Shadow
- Honda Fury
