= Honda Magna =

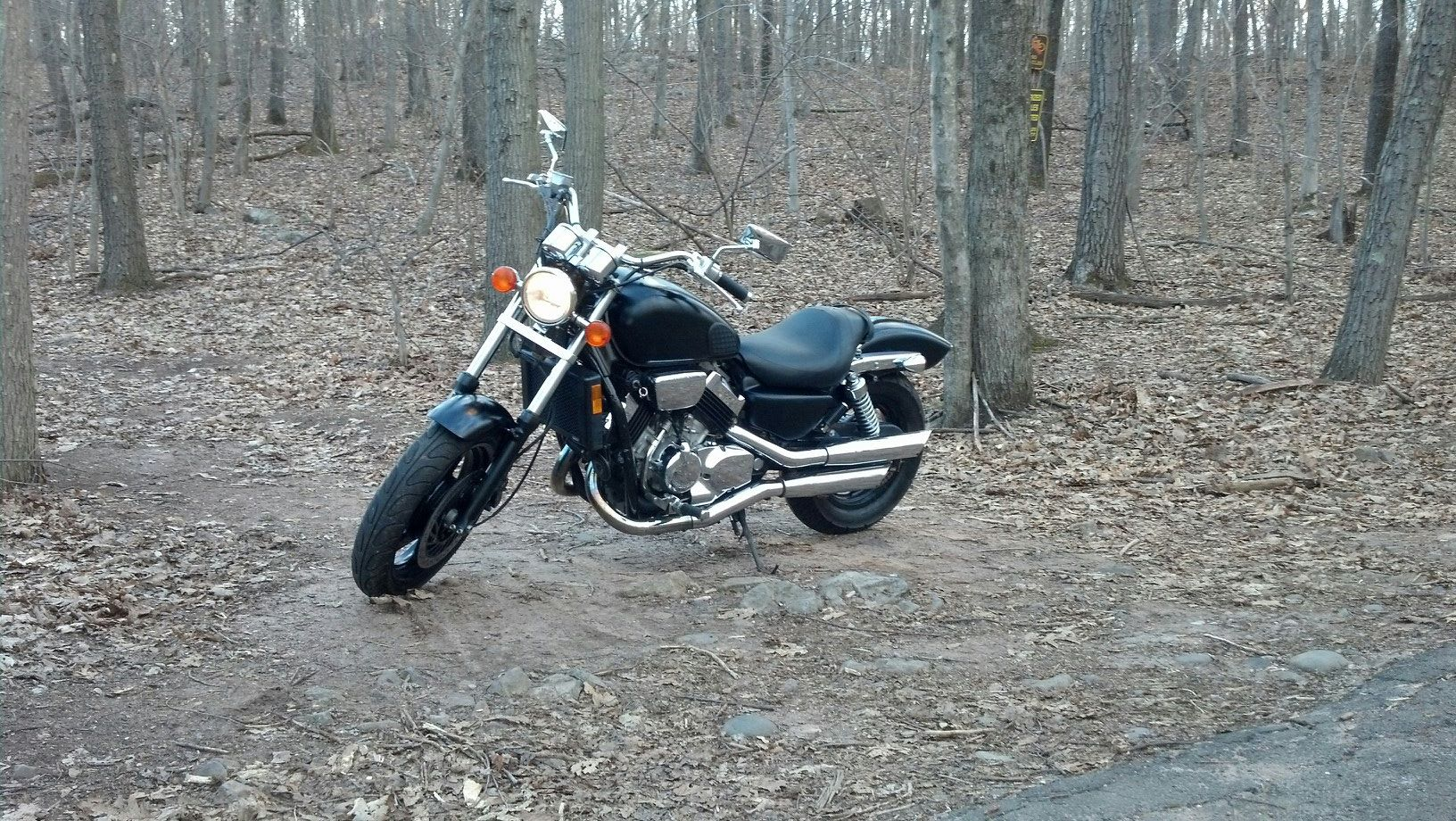
- Manufacturer: Honda
- Production: 1982–2003
- Class: Cruiser
- Engine: DOHC 4-valve 90° V-4
- Related: Honda Sabre, Honda Interceptor

The Honda Magna is a cruiser motorcycle made from 1982 to 1988 and 1994 to 2003 and was the second Honda to use their new V4 engine shared with the VF750S Sabre and a few years later a related engine was fitted to the VF750F 'Interceptor', the later models used a retuned engine from the VFR750F with fins added to the outside of the engine.

== Overview ==
The engine technology and layout was a descendant of Honda's racing V4 machines, such as the NS750 and NR750. The introduction of this engine on the Magna and the Sabre in 1982, was a milestone in the evolution of motorcycles that would culminate in 1983 with the introduction of the Interceptor V4. The V45's performance is comparable to that of Valkyries and Honda's 1800 cc V-twin cruisers. However, its mix of performance, reliability, and refinement was overshadowed by the more powerful 1,098 cc "V65" Magna in 1983.

Though criticized for its long-distance comfort and lauded mainly for its raw acceleration, the Magna was the bike of choice for Doris Maron, a Canadian grandmother and accountant-turned-traveler who toured the world solo by motorcycle. She made the trek without the benefit of the support crew that usually accompanies riders in adventures depicted in such films as Long Way Round.

The Honda Magna of years 1982–1988 incorporated a number of unique features into a cruiser market dominated by V-twin engines. The V4 engine configuration provided a balance between torque for good acceleration and high horsepower. The 90-degree layout produced less primary vibration, and the four cylinders provided a much smoother delivery of power than a V-twin. Good engine balance, plus short stroke and large piston diameter allowed for a high redline and potential top speed.

Besides the engine configuration, the bike had water-cooling, a six-speed transmission for good economy at highway speed, and common on other middleweight bikes for Honda in the early 1980s, shaft drive. While the shaft drive is very convenient with virtually no maintenance required (and no oil getting slung around), it also robbed some power from where it was more evidently lacking on in town or lower speed riding. It also had features like twin horns, hydraulic clutch, and an engine temperature gauge. A coil sprung, oil bath, air preload front fork with anti-dive valving was an improvement, although the Magna did not benefit from the linkage based single shock that was on the Sabre and Interceptor.

The V-65 Magna and other large-displacement Hondas were assembled in the Marysville Motorcycle Plant in Ohio for US delivery and in Japan for other markets. In 2008, Honda announced plans to close the plant, their oldest in North America, in 2009, which had been still making Gold Wings and VTX cruisers.

== 1982–1984 V45 (VF750C) Magna, 1984–1986 V42 (VF700C) Magna ==
1982–1983 V45
- Also called: VF750C V45
- Production: 1982–1983
- Successor: 1984 VF700C Magna
- Engine: 748 cc (45.6 cu in),
- Bore / stroke: 70 mm × 48.6 mm (2.76 in × 1.91 in)
- Compression ratio: 10.5:1
- Transmission: 6-speed, straight-cut Gears, multi-plate wet clutch, shaft drive.
- Suspension: Front: telescopic anti-dive travel: 5.5in, Rear: swingarm, travel: 3.9in
- Brakes: Front: Dual 10.8in disc Rear: 6.25in drum
- Tires: Front: 110/90-18 Rear: 130/90-16
- Rake, trail: 30° / 4.1 in
- Wheelbase: 60.6 in
- Dimensions: W: 29 in
- Seat height: 30 in
- Fuel capacity: 3.7 US gallons, including 1 gallon reserve.
- Oil capacity: 3.1 U.S. quarts; 2.9 litres

1984 VF700C
- Also called: VF750C V45
- Production: 1984
- Successor: 1985 VF700C Magna
- Engine: 748 cc (45.6 cu in),
- Bore / stroke: 70 mm × 45.4 mm (2.76 in × 1.79 in)
- Compression ratio: 10.5:1
- Transmission: 6-speed, straight-cut Gears, Multi-plate wet clutch, shaft drive.
- Suspension: Front: telescopic anti-dive, travel: 5.5in, Rear: swingarm, travel: 3.9in
- Brakes: Front: Dual 10.8in disc, Rear: 6.25in drum
- Tires: Front: 110/90-18 Rear: 130/90-16
- Rake, trail: 30° / 4.1 in
- Wheelbase: 60.6 in
- Dimensions: W: 29 in
- Seat height: 30 in
- Fuel capacity: 3.7 US gallons, including 1 gallon reserve.
- Oil capacity: 3.1 U.S. quarts; 2.9 litres

1985–1986 VF700C
- Also called: VF700C V42
- Production: 1985–1986
- Successor: 1987 VF700C Magna
- Engine: 698 cc (42.6 cu in),
- Bore / stroke: 70 mm × 45.4 mm (2.76 in × 1.79 in)
- Compression ratio: 10.5:1
- Transmission: 6-speed, straight-cut Gears, multi-plate wet clutch, shaft drive.
- Suspension: Front: telescopic anti-dive travel: 5.5in Rear: swingarm, travel: 3.9in
- Brakes: Front: Dual 10.8in disc, Rear: 6.25in drum
- Tires: Front: 110/90-18 Rear: 140/90-15
- Rake, trail: 30° / 4.1 in
- Wheelbase: 60.6 in
- Dimensions: W: 29 in
- Seat height: 28 in
- Fuel capacity: 3.7 US gallons
- Oil capacity: 3.1 U.S. quarts; 2.9 litres

=== 1982–1984 VF750C and VF700C ===
The 1982 V45 Magna has a round chrome headlight and fenders. The headlight is a sealed beam type. The front disc brakes have straight grooves, dual piston calipers, and TRAC anti-dive. The speedometer reads 80 mph and the tachometer indicates a 10,000 rpm redline. The engine is a 748 cc (45.6 cu in) DOHC 16-valve liquid-cooled 90-degree V-4 linked to a six-speed transmission with a hydraulically actuated wet-plate clutch and shaft drive. The compression is 10.5:1. The 1982 V45 covered 1/4 mile in 12.08 seconds at 108.82 MPH.

The 1983 V45 Magna is the same as the 1982 model with few differences. Early in the model year, the headlight was changed to a non-sealed beam unit with a replaceable halogen bulb. The front disc brake grooves are curved. The speedometer reads to 150 mph (240 km/h) but the redline on the tachometer is unchanged. (1983 starting SN JH2RC071*DM100011)

The US government imposed tariff rate hikes for foreign-built motorcycles over 700 cc in order to combat their rise in sales in North America, and to aid the domestic motorcycle manufacturers, namely Harley-Davidson. So for 1984 Honda responded by reducing the engine size for the VF750s to 698 cc by decreasing stroke on all of their 750cc engines, so the Magna became the VF700C in the USA. A side effect of this change was a higher-revving engine (redline now 10,500rpm) with similar power figures as the 750s. In 1984 rev limiters within the CDI units were added as well to help prevent over-revving that was fairly common with the earlier 750 models. The headlight changed from round chrome to a rectangular chrome housing. The seats were changed to a wider & lower 2 piece design in an attempt to improve rider comfort. The rear shocks also changed to eliminate the extra fluid reservoir. The wheels were different as well now being an "open" 5-spoke wheel like Honda's VT500s but with chrome the way around the rim's lip but were the same size. Honda only made the VF700 for 1984, 1985, 1986, and 1987, then back to the VF750 after that. In the first part of 1984, some Magnas were still VF750s though 1984 750s were more common with Interceptors (VF750F).

Models from 1982 to 1984 were unique in their use of a larger primary fuel tank and smaller sub-tank. The sub-tank is located directly behind the left side cover, well below the level of the carburetor banks and has a low-fuel sensor incorporated into the body. Owing to the low seat height (much lower than in a standard street bike) and cruiser styling of the bike, the main tank is relatively small. Because the bottom end of the sub-tank is so low, all bikes in this family have a fuel pump to get the fuel up into the carburetors. In practice, the fuel pump adds more complexity to a carbureted bike which otherwise doesn't need pressure-fed fuel.

=== 1985–1986 VF700C ===
For the 1985 and 1986 models, the sub-tank was dropped in favor of a slightly larger and wider main tank. Again because the reserve level of the tank was below the carburetors, the requisite fuel pump and series of fuel lines – although changed – were kept. Also for 1985 and 1986 the previously chrome, round rear fender became a painted single-piece unit much wider and taller like more classic cruisers which allowed for a wider rear tire. 1985 and 1986 saw new wheels too. Some of the trim around the Magna was changed as well, like the addition of a passenger back rest, smaller side covers, slightly lower seat and footpeg positions, brighter instrument cluster, slightly larger airbox covers, lighter front brake rotors, an improved radiator (now with a shut-off valve to greatly ease servicing), new exhaust, and the engine had silver case covers instead of the black prior years had. These engines also had silver aluminum covers over the engine's shaft-drive output while prior years used black plastic covers, the engines were otherwise the same VF700 as 1984 with identical gear ratios and all.

In 1986 some of the parts around the Magna now had the "Magna Bird" emblem present on the airbox covers, the driver seat, and the passenger backrest. For only 1986 the engines had unique cylinder heads, the rear heads now featured a new cosmetic bolt-on piece and while all previous VF700s/VF750s used head bolts and more square valve covers 1986s were revised with line-bored camshaft journals thus taking different camshafts and valve covers. The new valve covers allowed for easier valve-rocker adjustment which would normally be a difficult procedure, but because of the shape head bolts had to be replaced with head studs so 1986 models have chrome acorn nuts where zinc-plated headbolts once were. These were the only changes from 1985 to 1986, the following years of Magnas would be quite different.

== 1983–1986 V65 (VF1100C) Magna ==
1983–1986 V65
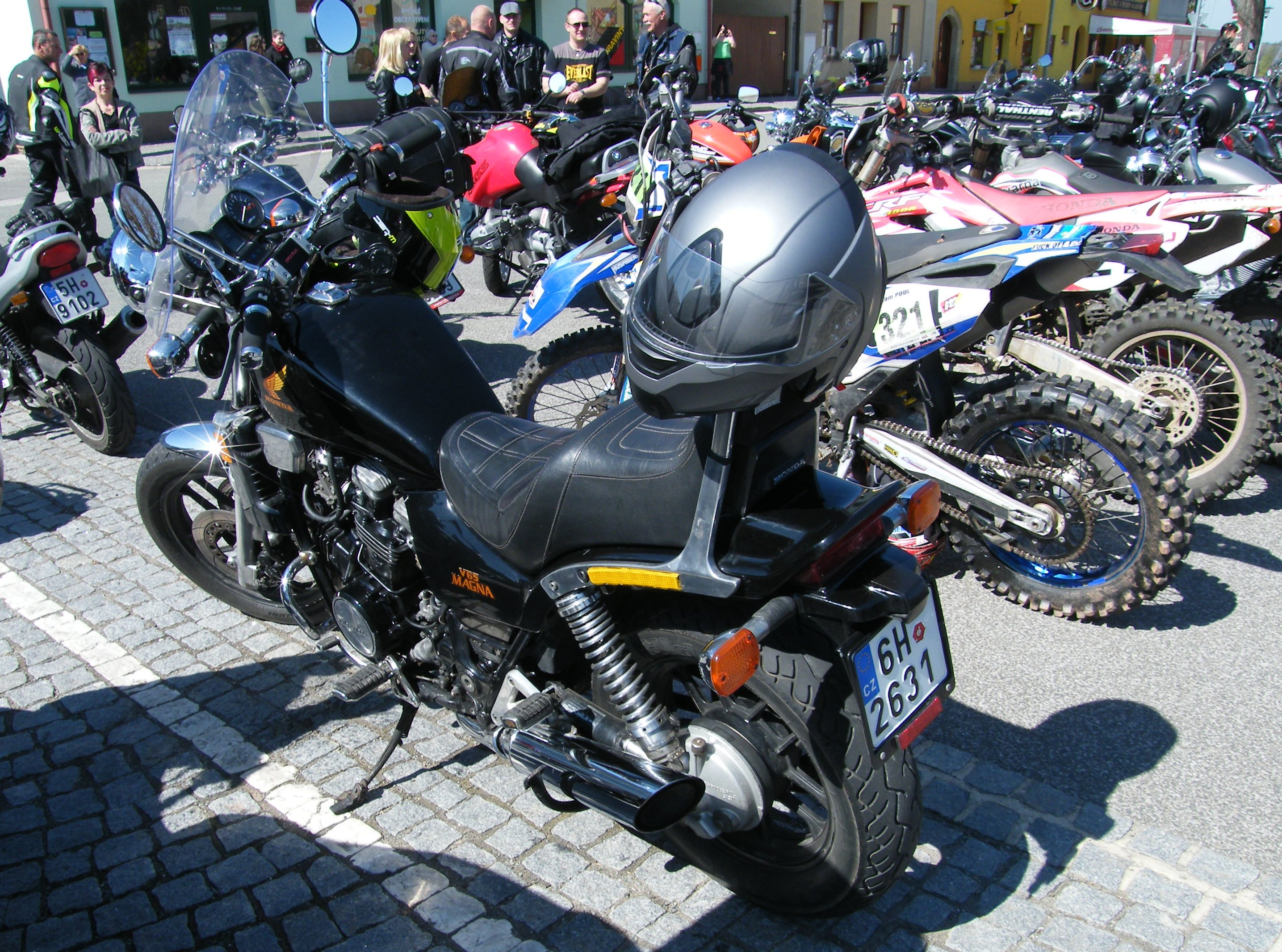
- Also called: VF1100C
- Production: 1983–1986
- Engine: 1,098 cc (67.0 cu in)
- Power: 116 bhp (87 kW) (claimed)
- Torque: 70 lb⋅ft (95 N⋅m) @ 7,500 rpm (claimed)
- Transmission: 6-speed, shaft drive
- Tires: Front M110/90-18 tubeless: Rear M140/90-16 tubeless
- Wheelbase: 62.8 in (1,600 mm)
- Dimensions: L: 89.8 in (2,280 mm); W: 31.9 in (810 mm); H: 47.6 in (1,210 mm)
- Weight: 540 lb (240 kg) (dry); 590 lb (270 kg) (wet)

The large displacement 1,098 cc (67.0 cu in) V65 Magna attracted attention as Honda's entry in the 1/4 mile wars between manufacturers at the time, causing Suzuki to respond with the 1200 Madura (which had a 1/4 mile time of 11.66 s at 115.7 mph), and going up against such competition as the Suzuki GS1150E (10.47 s at 128 mph). The V65 lay somewhere between these two in performance, posting a quarter mile time of 11.29 s at 119.2 mph (191.8 km/h).

The 1983 V65 Magna was tested at a top speed of 224 km/h (139 mph). In a 1983 Popular Mechanics achieved a top speed of 225.49 km/h (140.11 mph), ranking it third of four motorcycles tested, less than 3.2 km/h (2 mph) slower than the Kawasaki GPZ1100 and Suzuki GS1100s.

In spite of this, the V65 Magna appeared from 1986 to 1989 in the Guinness Book of World Records as the fastest production motorcycle with a "design speed" of 278 to 283 km/h (173 to 176 mph). During this period the production motorcycle with the fastest tested speed was the 151–158 miles per hour (243–254 km/h) Kawasaki GPZ900R.

== 1984–1985 V30 (VF500C) Magna ==
1984–1986 V30 – PC08
- 1984 Honda Magna V30
- Manufacturer: Honda
- Also called: VF500C
- Production: 1984–1986
- Predecessor: V45
- Class: Cruiser
- Bore / stroke: 60 mm × 44 mm (2.4 in × 1.7 in)
- Compression ratio: 11.0:1
- Transmission: 6-speed transmission, wet clutch, automatic cam-chain tensioners, self-adjusting hydraulic clutch
- Suspension: Front: leading axle, air adjustable fork, 37 mm tubes, 6.3 in. travel. Rear: dual shock absorbers, 4.3 in travel
- Brakes: Front hydraulic, single disc, twin piston caliper
- Tires: Front 100/90-18 Rear 130/90-16
- Rake, trail: 35.1° / 4.4 in.
- Wheelbase: 58.4 in (1,480 mm)
- Seat height: 29.9 in (760 mm)
- Fuel capacity: 3.7 gallons / 14 liters
- Oil capacity: 2.6 qt / 2.46 liters

The Honda VF500 is one of Honda's second generation V4 motorcycle engines produced in a series of motorcycles designated with VF and VFR initials. For 1984–1986, Honda produced the 498 cc, V4 DOHC VF500 for the VF500C Magna V30 (1984/85) and its sister bike, the VF500F (1984–86). This engine is an evolution of Honda's original domestic market 400 cc engine, originally deemed too small and underpowered for certain markets - notably the United States and Europe. Focusing on adding power and versatility to its motorcycle offerings, Honda bored the original 400 cc motor and improved its power and performance. The engine is almost entirely identical to the version in the Interceptor VF500F sport bike, and while Honda sold the VF500C Magna in the United States, it advertised it as the "most powerful midsize custom in the world".

This standard motorcycle was introduced as "a balanced bike that was easier to ride" in town than its larger Magna siblings, with good power and a broad torque band. Because of its V4 design, the power in the 500 engine is not peaky and ample torque can be found throughout the rev band, and the six-speed transmission ratio was unique to this bike versus the ratio on the VF500F. The engine produced between 64 and 68 horsepower, and combined with its low weight and low center of gravity, the bike was lauded by critics as an easy to ride and entertaining motorcycle.

The Magna had no shaft drive like its larger siblings, but a traditional chain drive.

=== Specifications ===
- Standing-start quarter mile - 12.9 sec at 103 mph
- 0–60 in 3.9 seconds
- 60–0 in 120.6 feet

==== Changes by year ====
- The "HONDA" fuel tank logo was straight in 1984, and curved up in 1985

Facts from Cycle Magazine, July 1984

== 1987–1988 Super Magna (1987 V42 (VF700C) Magna and 1988 V45 (VF750C) Magna) ==
VF700C Magna, VF750C V45 Magna
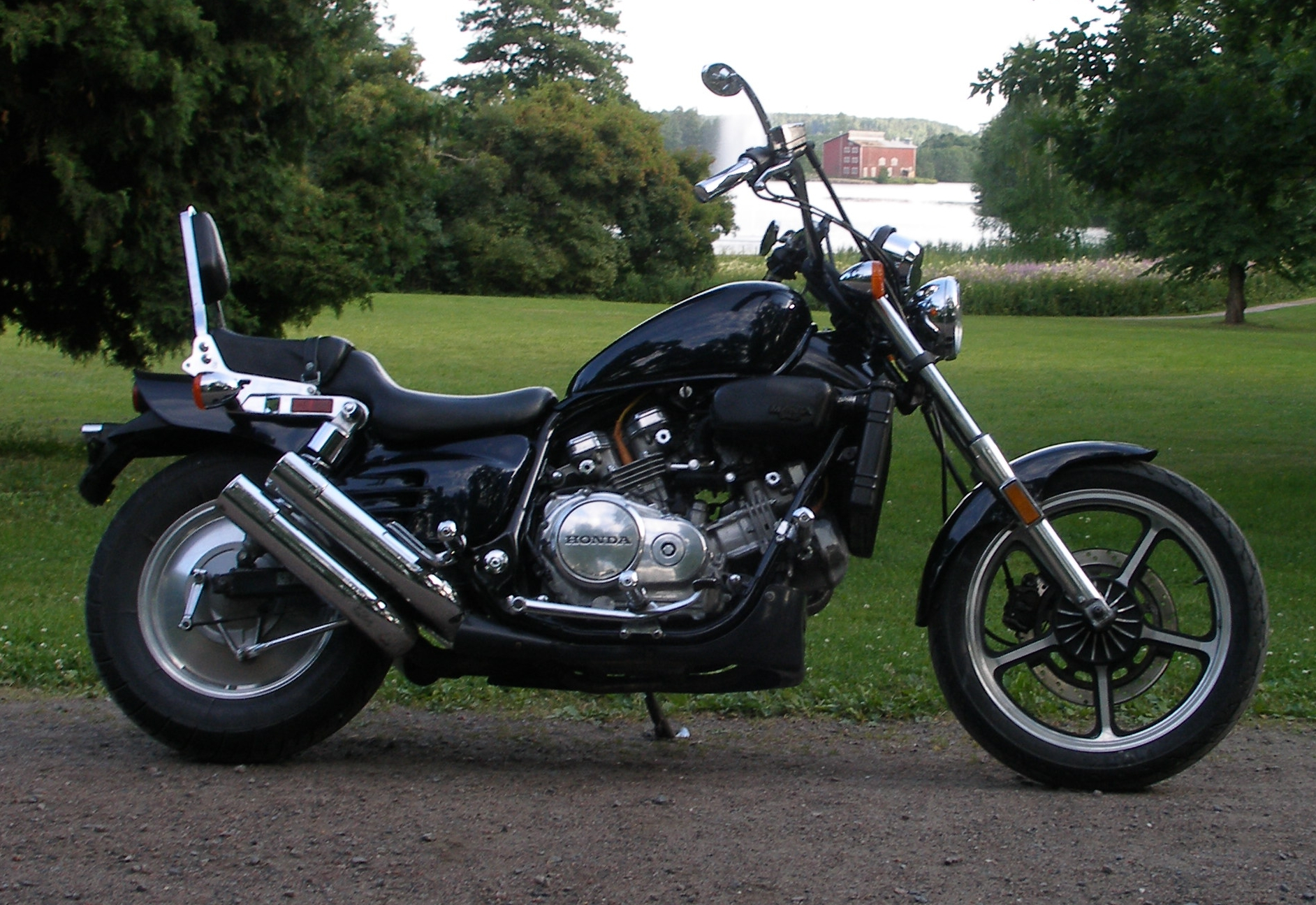
- 1987 Honda Super Magna, Canadian-export model
- Manufacturer: Honda
- Also called: Super Magna
- Production: 1987–1988
- Predecessor: 1986 VF700C Magna
- Successor: 1994 VF750C Magna
- Class: Cruiser
- Engine: 699 cc (42.7 cu in) (1987) / 748 cc (45.6 cu in) (1988)
- Transmission: 6-speed, shaft drive
- Suspension: 39 mm non adjustable fork, dual coil over shocks
- Brakes: Single disc front, drum rear
- Tires: Front: 100/90-19 tubeless, Rear: 150/80-15 tubeless
- Rake, trail: 55°/ 152mm (6.0 in)
- Wheelbase: 1,660 mm (65 in)
- Dimensions: L: 2,360 mm (93 in); W: 810 mm (32 in); H: 1,155 mm (45.5 in)
- Seat height: 27.8 inches (710 mm)
- Fuel capacity: 13 L (2.9 imp gal; 3.4 US gal)

Various mechanical and cosmetic changes were introduced over the years, but the basic core of the Magna remained the same. The second generation Magna of 1987–1988 was dubbed the Super Magna by aficionados of the bike, though it was not an official Honda name. In 1987, the 699 cc engine produced 80 brake horsepower (60 kW) @ 9,500 rpm, with torque being 46 lb⋅ft (62 N⋅m) @ 7,500 rpm. In 1988, the Magna grew back to its original size of 748 cc.

In countries other than the US, the Magna continued as a 750. The Magna V-four has endured through the first and second generations of the VF and VFR Interceptors - both come and gone by 1988. Like the original 750 Sabre and VF 750, this 750 Magna engine uses a 360-degree crankshaft and chain-driven double-overhead camshafts. Thus, the VF750C unit is technologically quite different from Honda's last V-four sport bike engine, the VFR750 Interceptor, which had gear-driven overhead cams and a 180-degree crankshaft.

The Super's cams are also line-bored (a feature first seen in the Euro 1985 VF1000F & F-II, and 85/86 VF1000R, 1986 VF500F, 1986 VF700C Magna), which greatly reduced the premature cam wear that plagued the earlier models, together with changed oil ducts.

The 1987 V45 Magna was available in either Candy Wave Blue or Candy Bourgogne Red (1988 dropped Blue in favor of Black). For 1987, the fake airbox covers were wrinkle black with a "Magna" emblem. The fake airbox emblem changes to "V45" for the 1988 model.

The 1987 Super Magna had a silver, grey and black Honda "wing" tank decal on the Candy Wave Blue tanks, and a silver, black, and red decal on the Candy Bourgogne Red tanks. The 1988 model had a silver "MAGNA" tank decal.

The exhaust system was now an upswept 4-into-4 set of pipes, unique in the cruiser world. Although the exhaust pipes were a beautiful sight, they were not friendly to the use of saddlebags as they were too high. The rear wheel was a solid aluminum disc. The chin fairing was unfinished black plastic for the 87, and color-matched for the 88. The second generation was also the first to have the lower seat height of a mere 27.8 inches (710 mm), more than 4 inches (100 mm) lower than its predecessor. The production numbers of 1987 and 1988 Magnas have never been released by Honda. In 1987 the Super Magna came in red or blue - about 16,000 total were built In 1988 the Super Magna came in red or black - about 3500 total were built

== 1994–2003 (VF750C) Magna ==
1994–2003 VF750C
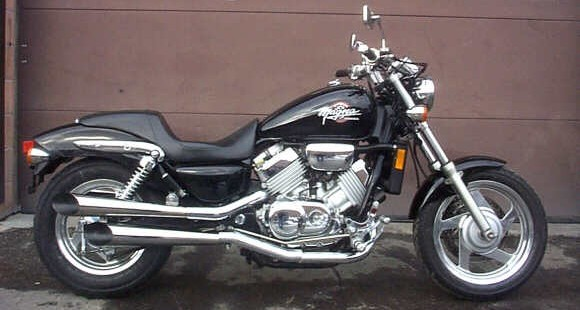
- 1999 Honda Magna with aftermarket saddle and exhaust.
- Manufacturer: Honda
- Also called: VF750C
- Production: 1994–2003
- Engine: 748.8 cc (45.69 cu in) liquid-cooled 90° V-4
- Bore / stroke: 70 mm × 48.6 mm (2.76 in × 1.91 in)
- Compression ratio: 10.8:1
- Top speed: 120 mph (190 km/h)
- Power: 87 bhp (65 kW) (rear wheel)
- Torque: 51.3 ft⋅lb (69.6 N⋅m) (at rear wheel)
- Transmission: 5-speed, O-ring chain
- Suspension: Front: 41 mm cartridge fork; 150 mm travel, Rear: Dual shocks with 5-way spring preload adjustability; 3.9 inches (99 mm) travel
- Brakes: Front: 2-piston caliper, 12.4 inches (310 mm) disc. Rear: Single-leading-shoe drum
- Tires: Tubeless, Front: 120/80-17, Rear: 150/80-15
- Rake, trail: 32°, 5.2 in (130 mm)
- Wheelbase: 65.0 in (1,650 mm)
- Seat height: 28.0 in (710 mm)
- Weight: 550 lb (250 kg) (wet)
- Fuel capacity: 3.6 US gal (14 L; 3.0 imp gal)
- Oil capacity: 3.3 US qt (3,100 ml)

The Magna 750 was launched in 1993 as an early release 1994 model. Honda sought to capture the market for powerful cruisers by lifting the engine from the VFR750 and slotting it in a cruiser chassis. The engine itself was beautified by the addition of chrome and some extra fins, and by the chromed 4 into 4 exhaust. The seat was kept very low, at 28 inches, with the passenger seat being detachable. The all new frame was complemented by 41 mm forks, dual shocks, and a single disc on the front. A drum brake was used on the rear. A few internal changes were made to the VFR engine for use in the Magna, including a different crankshaft, a 5-speed transmission and chain driven cams. Smaller carbs were also utilized. The changes resulted in a stronger mid-range pull, and a very broad band of power.

The design of the 3rd-generation Magna remained relatively unchanged over its lifetime. The tank decal was changed in 1995, and a miniature fairing was available on 1995 and 1996 Deluxe models.

2004 saw the demise of the Magna, along with other Honda stablemates such as the V-Twin Shadow ACE and Shadow Spirit, as well as the 6-cylinder Valkyrie.

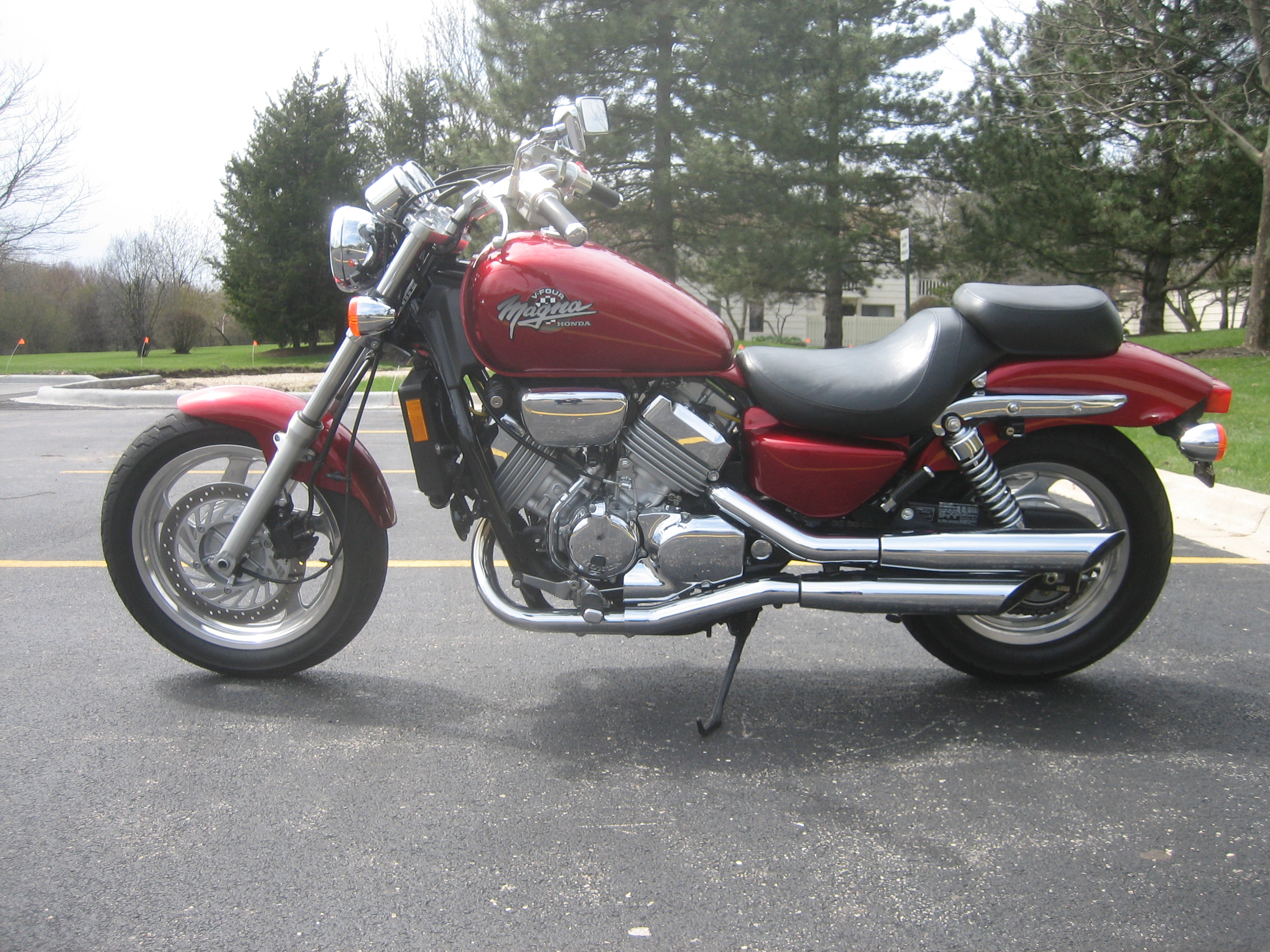

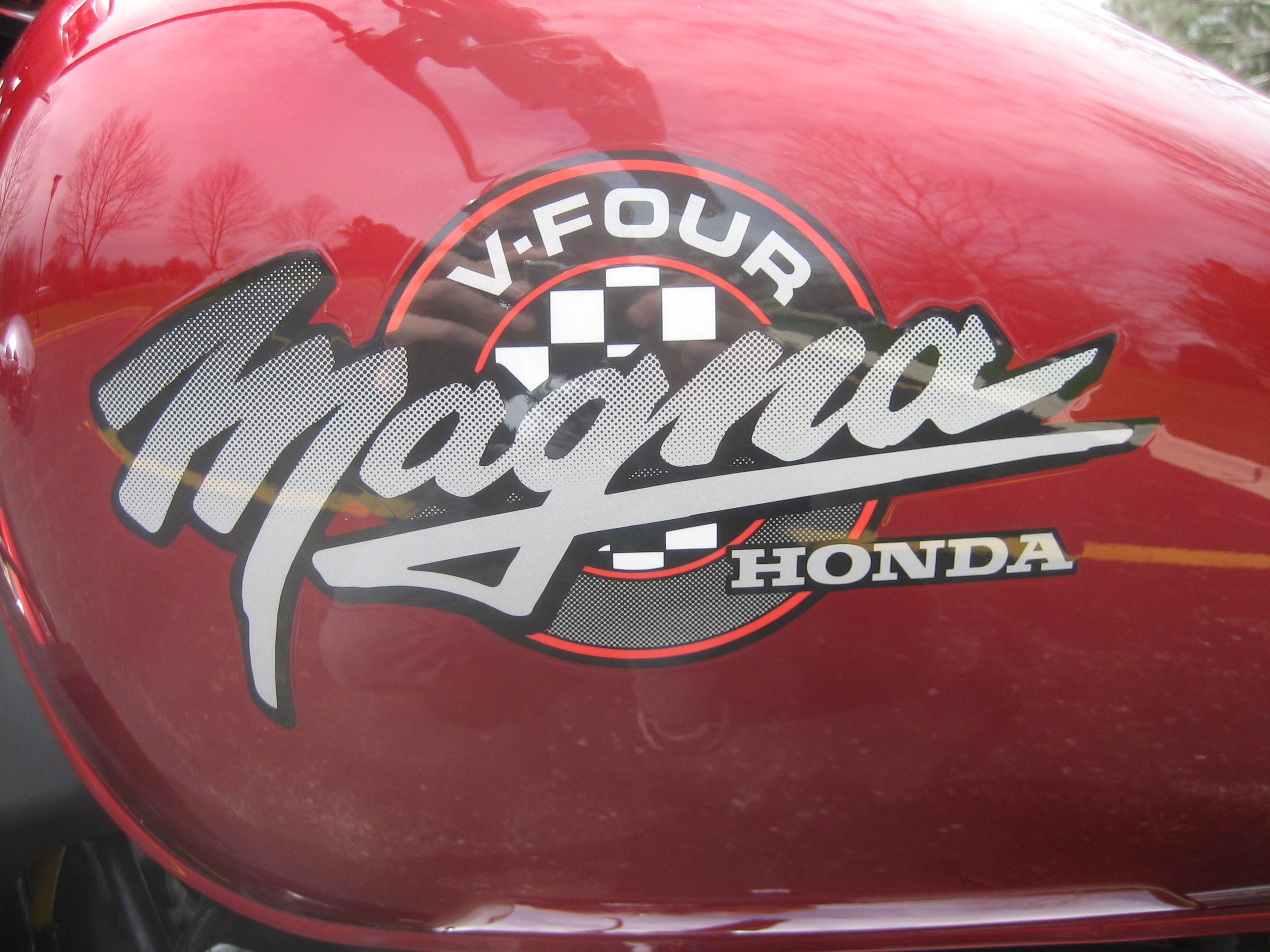

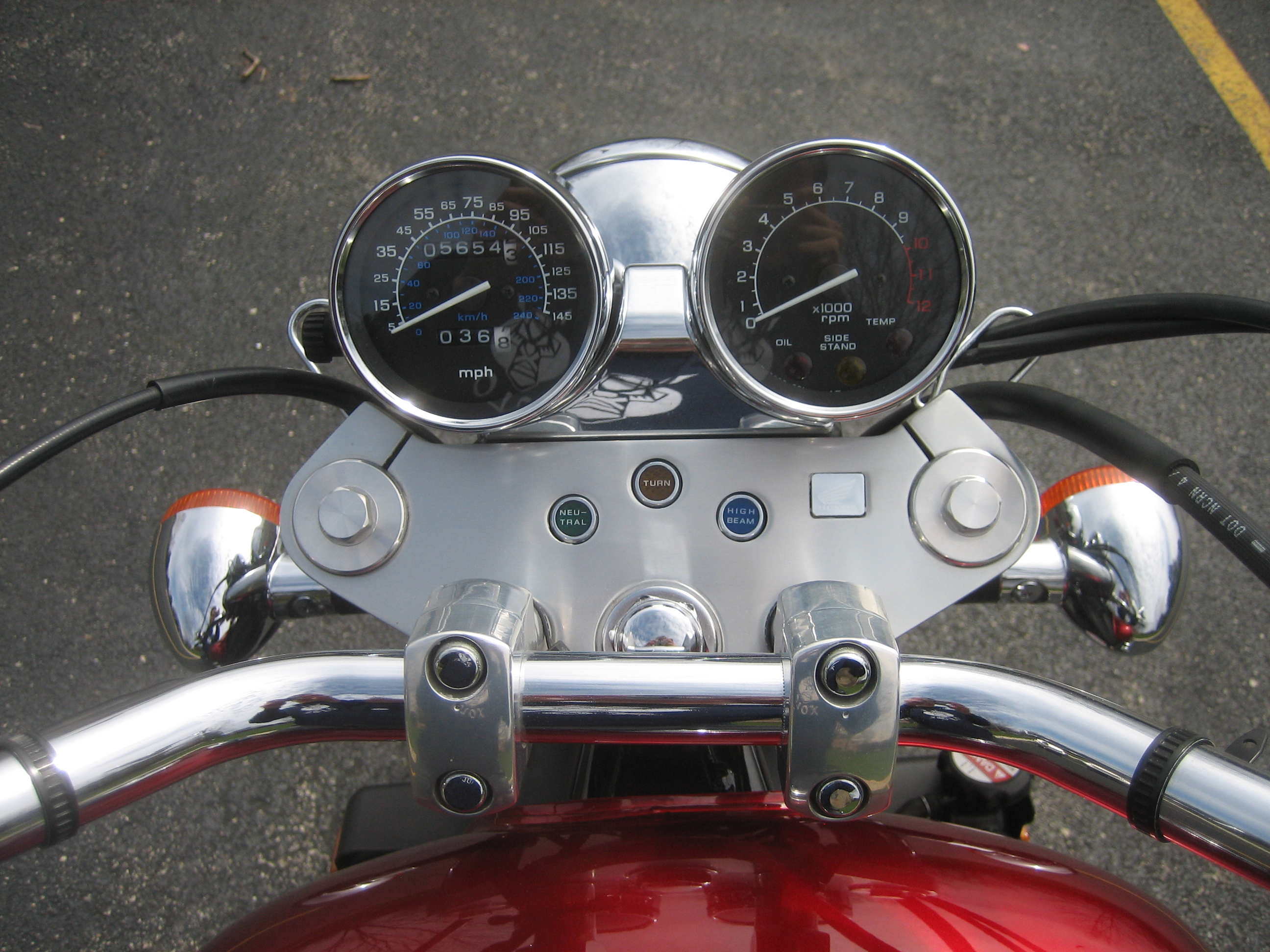

== 1994–2003 (VT250C) Magna ==
1994–2003 VT250C
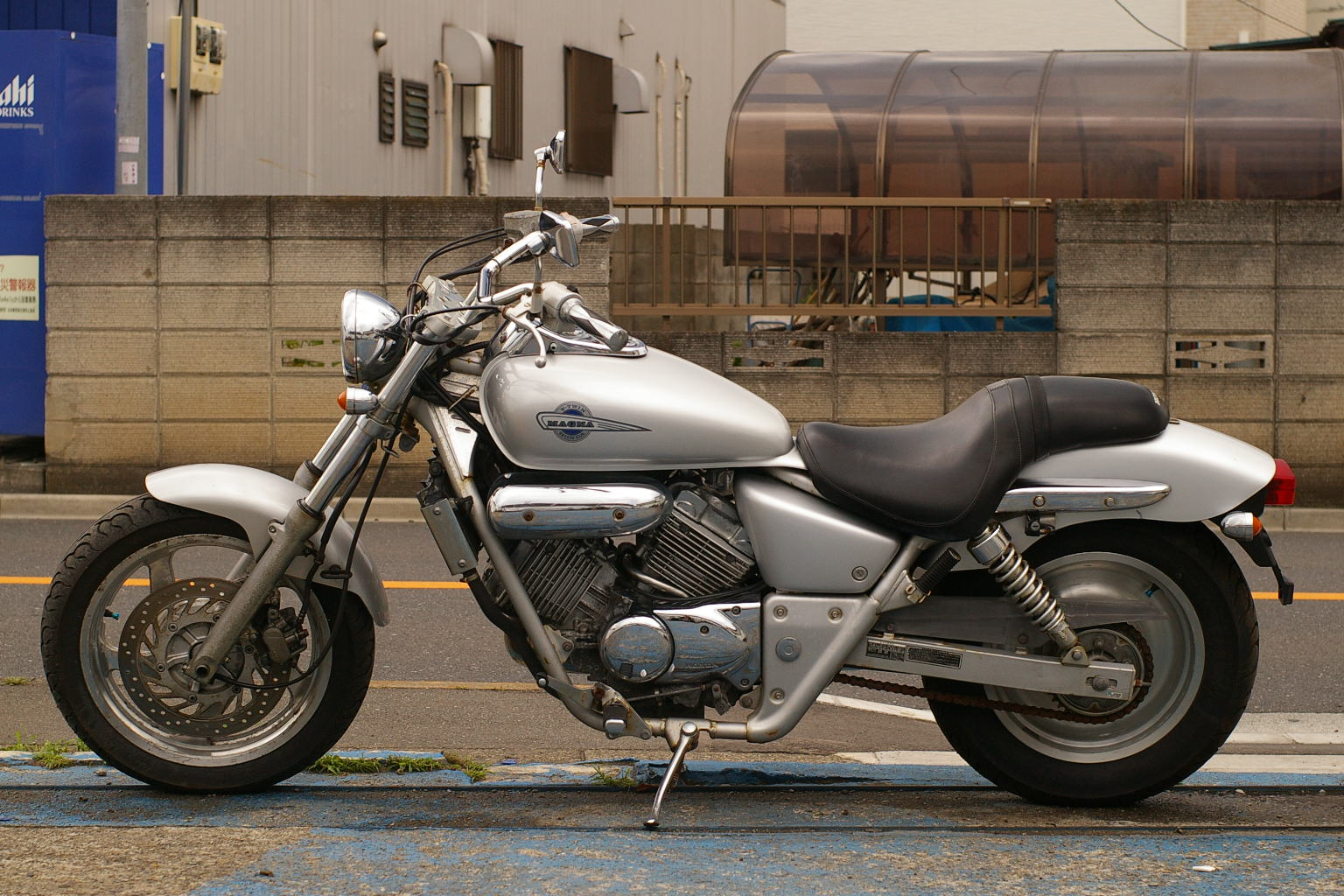
- Manufacturer: Honda
- Also called: VT250
- Production: 1994–2003
- Engine: 250 cc (15 cu in) liquid-cooled 90° V-2,
- Bore / stroke: 60.0 mm × 44.1 mm (2.36 in × 1.74 in)
- Compression ratio: 11.0:1
- Transmission: 5-speed, final drive: O-ring-sealed chain, multiple wet plate coil spring clutch
- Suspension: Front: telescopic, Rear: swingarm
- Brakes: Front: Hydraulic disc, Rear: Mechanical leading / trailing shoe
- Tires: Tubeless, Front: 120/80–17 61S, Rear: 150/80–15M/C 70S
- Wheelbase: 1,620 mm
- Dimensions: L: 2,315 mm W: 845 mm H: 1,055 mm
- Seat height: 28.0 inches (710 mm)
- Fuel capacity: 11 L (2.4 imp gal; 2.9 US gal) (plus reserve 2.9 L (0.64 imp gal; 0.77 US gal) (0.77 US Gallons)
- Oil capacity: 2.1 Litres (after oil & filter change)
